= Types of inline skates =

Different types of inline skates reflect the specific demands that various skating disciplines place on inline skate design. These disciplines include recreational skating, urban skating, roller hockey, street hockey, speed skating, slalom skating, aggressive skating, and artistic inline skating.

== Disciplines ==
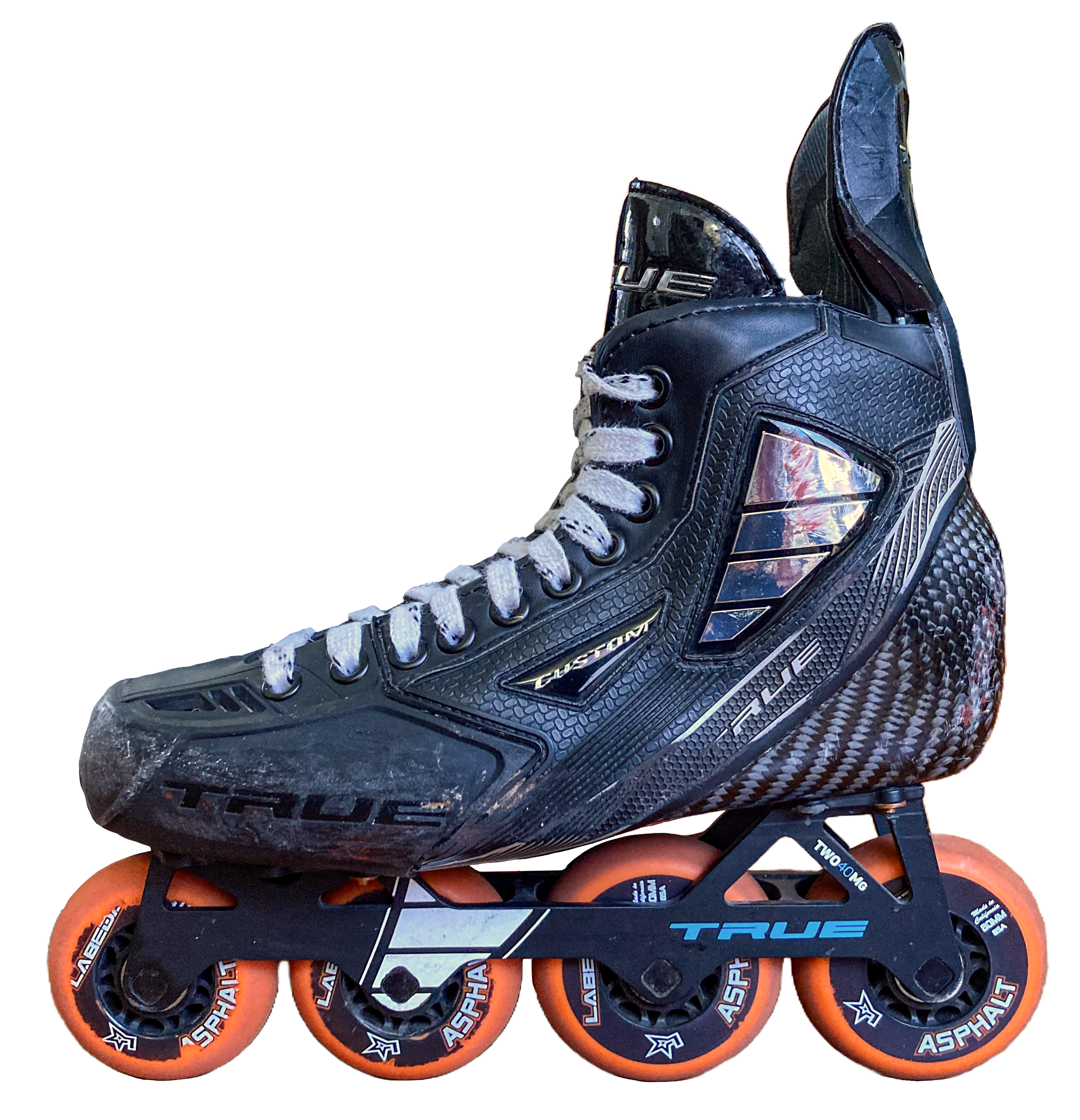
Hockey skate

Skate types are not always equivalent to skating disciplines. Often a particular type of skate can be used in several disciplines, with varying degrees of efficiency and comfort. For instance, when specifically designed skates are not available for freestyle slalom skating, a skater could use recreational skates, aggressive skates, hockey skates, or even speed skates. But some of these alternatives are more suitable for slalom skating than others. Hockey skates, in particular, most closely meet the needs of slalom skating, due to the shared requirement for rigorous turning and edging maneuvers in both roller hockey and slalom skating.

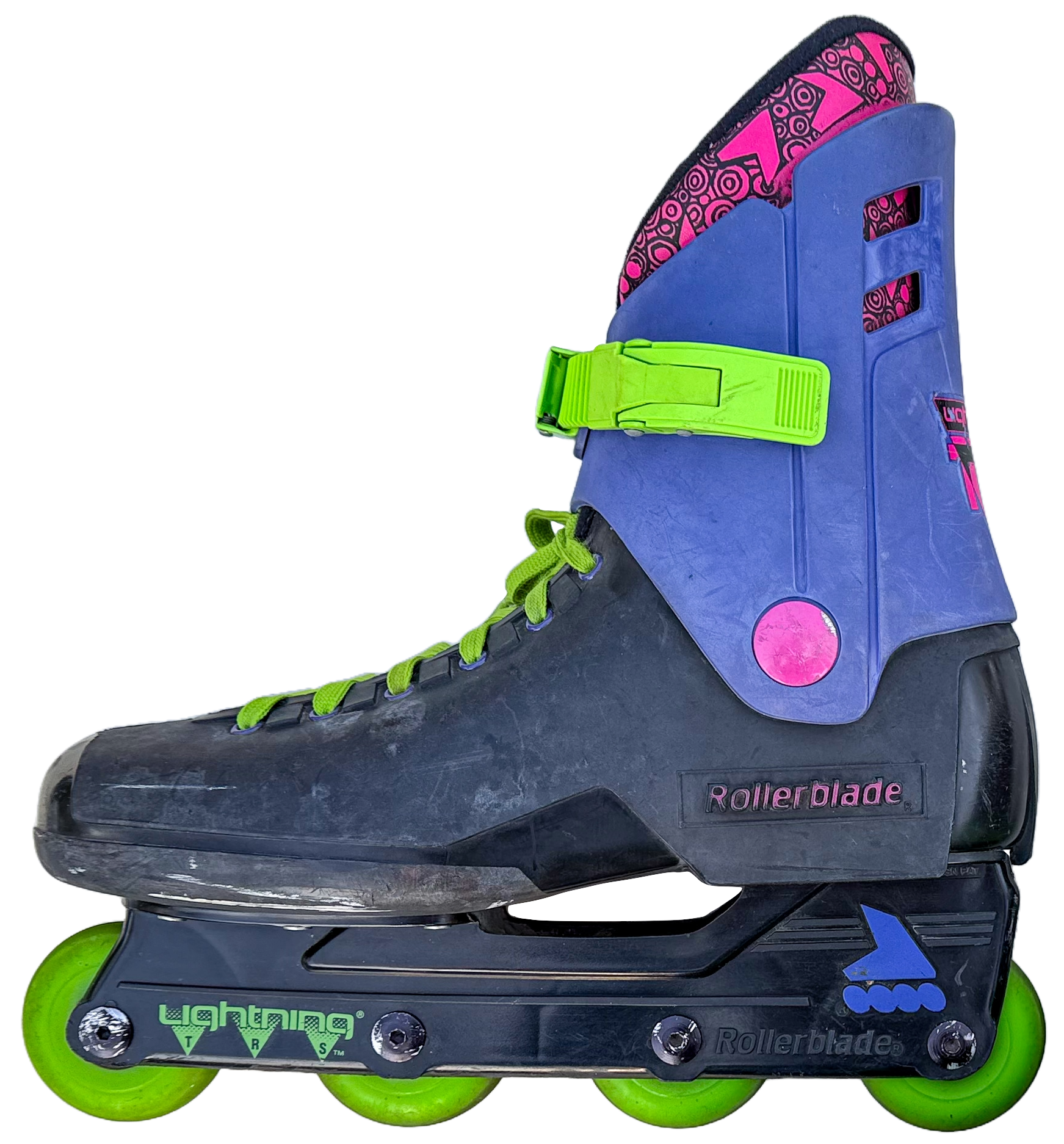
Lightning TRS

In some cases, a skate launches a whole new discipline. For instance, the Rollerblade Lightning TRS has been widely credited for enabling aggressive inline skating as a sport, with its durable boot and nylon-reinforced frame, suitable for skaters to perform grinds on street obstacles.

Disciplines and skates continue to evolve over time. In 1985, Roller Zetra wheels were advertised as much faster than the Pro-line wheels. But by 1988, 64 mm Rollerblade Zetra 100 and BladeRunner wheels had become the slower wheels, compared to faster, larger, and higher-end Lightning wheels, now at 70 mm in diameter. (Note: See page 1 of Skates on Haigh mail-order catalog from the fall of 1988, for then-current skate selection from Rollerblade: Lightning at $175, Zetra at $145, BladeRunner at $99. See 1990 ad in Skiing promoting Lightning as being much faster than Zetra 100. A 1990 wheel kit package shows wheel sizes for Rollerblade 608 (70 mm), Rollerblade Max-Trainer (70 mm), Rollerblade 303 (70 mm), Rollerblade 100 (Zetra 100, 64 mm) and BladeRunner (64 mm), archived here. These 1990 polyurethane wheels were made by Kryptonics for Rollerblade.) Around 1995 to 1999, a normal wheel size for recreational skates was 70-72 mm, and large wheels for speed skates meant 78-82 mm. By 2024, the standard wheel size for recreational skates had increased to 80-84 mm, and large wheels for speed skates ranged from 90 mm to 125 mm.

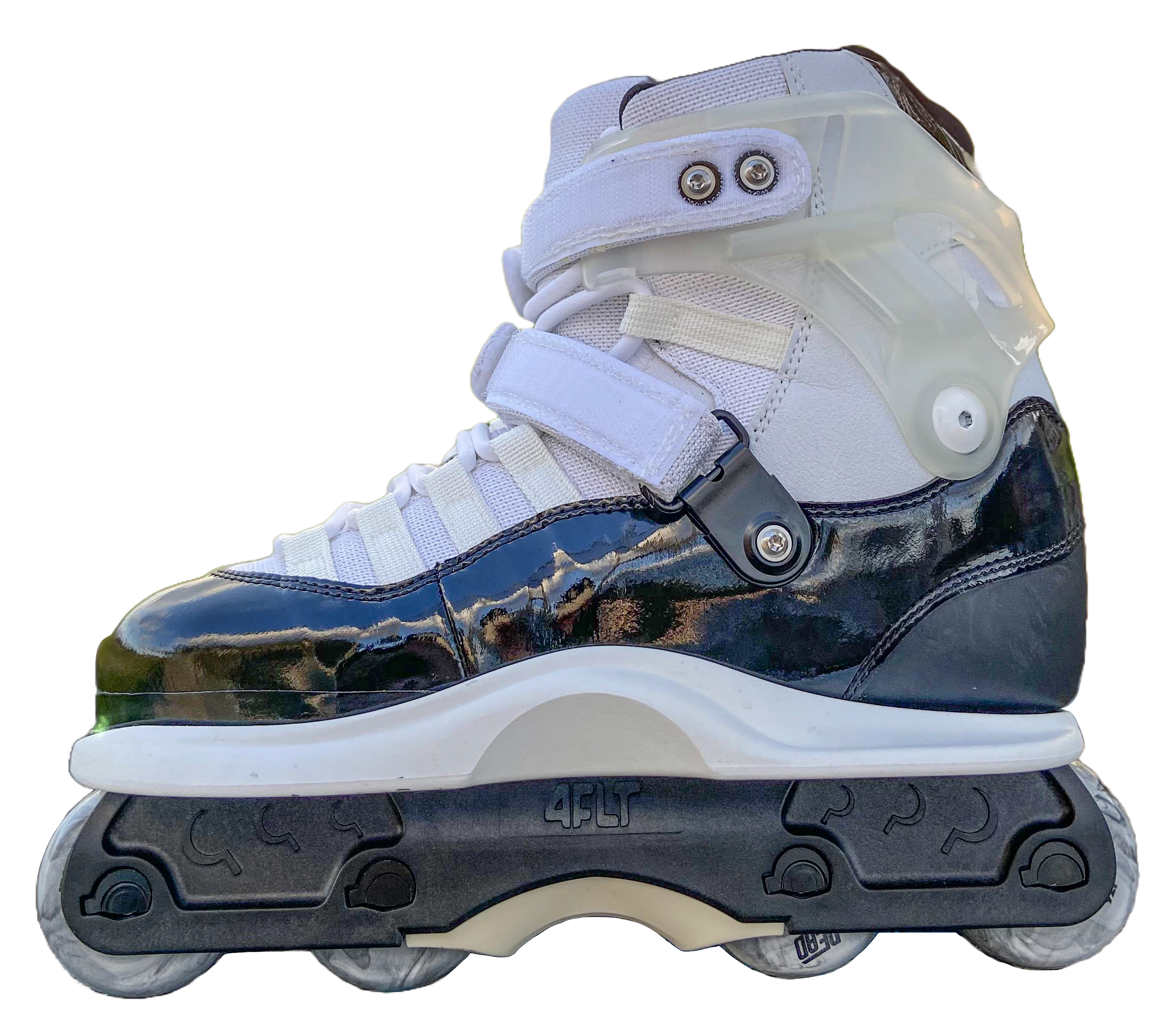
Aggressive skate

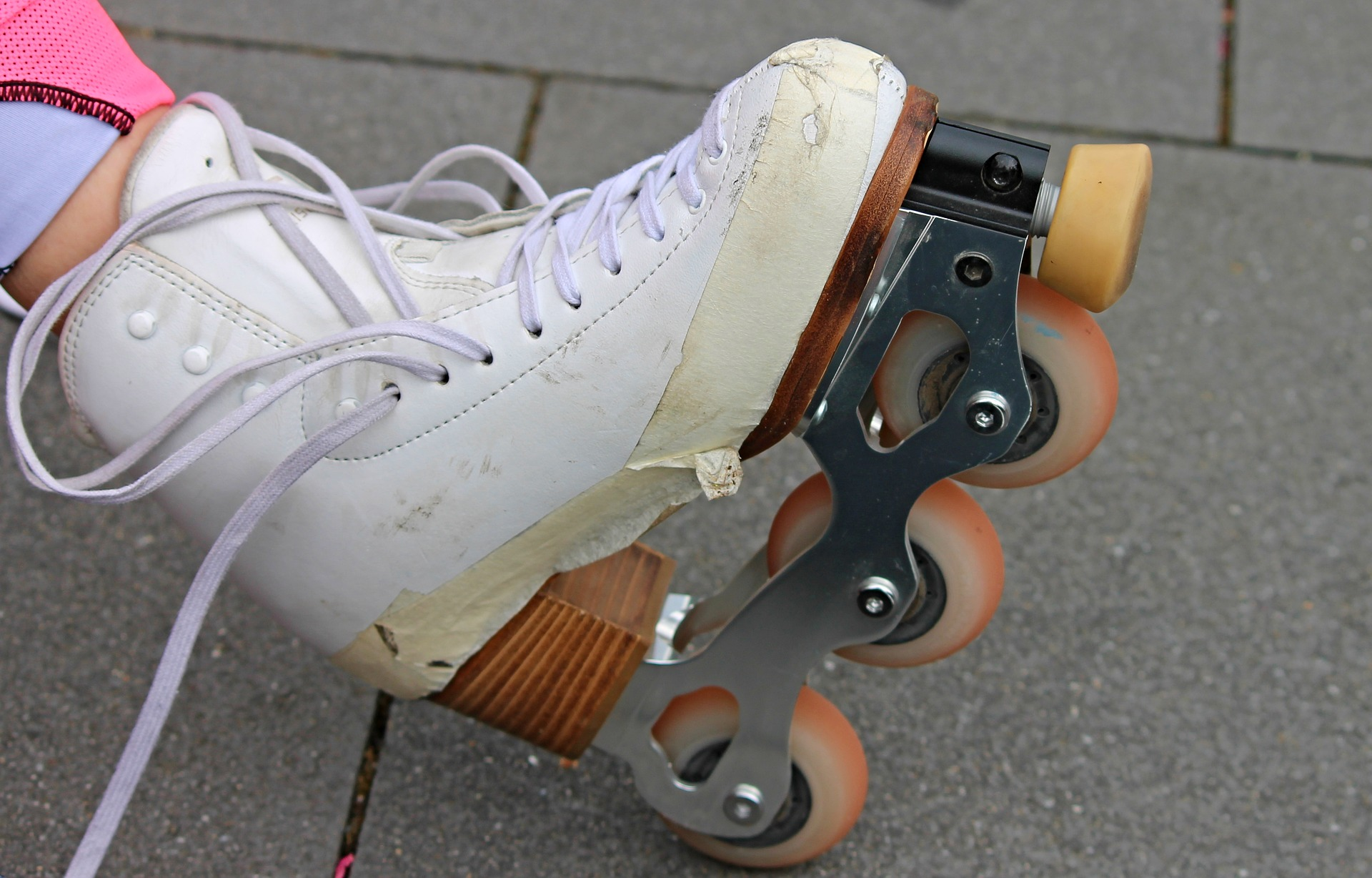
Inline figure skate

For simplicity in advertising, manufacturers and resellers generally classify inline skates based on disciplines. Some types named this way are significantly distinct from one another, with their own unmistakable features. For instance, "aggressive skates" have signature soul plates and H-blocks (or grooves), for grinding on urban street and skatepark obstacles. "Speed skates" have low-cuff boots with long frames and large wheels, for gaining absolute top speed. "Hockey skates" have reinforced quarter panels instead of hinged cuffs, for better ankle support.

Some disciplines are not large enough to warrant their own classification. Thus, dissimilar disciplines with similar equipment needs are grouped under a single skate category. For instance, freestyle skating, slalom skating, wizard skating, city commuting, and urban skating may be crammed into a single "urban skates" category.

Then, there are the rest of skaters who casually skate, skate for fitness, or skate for cross-training. These purposes constitute 90% of actual inline skate sales. Skates suitable for these activities are often grouped together as "recreational skates". Some makers instead call them "fitness skates". Others split them into two or more categories: recreational, fitness, and cross-training. Usually, the fitness and cross-training categories reflect increasing cost and thus quality of skates.

== Recreational ==
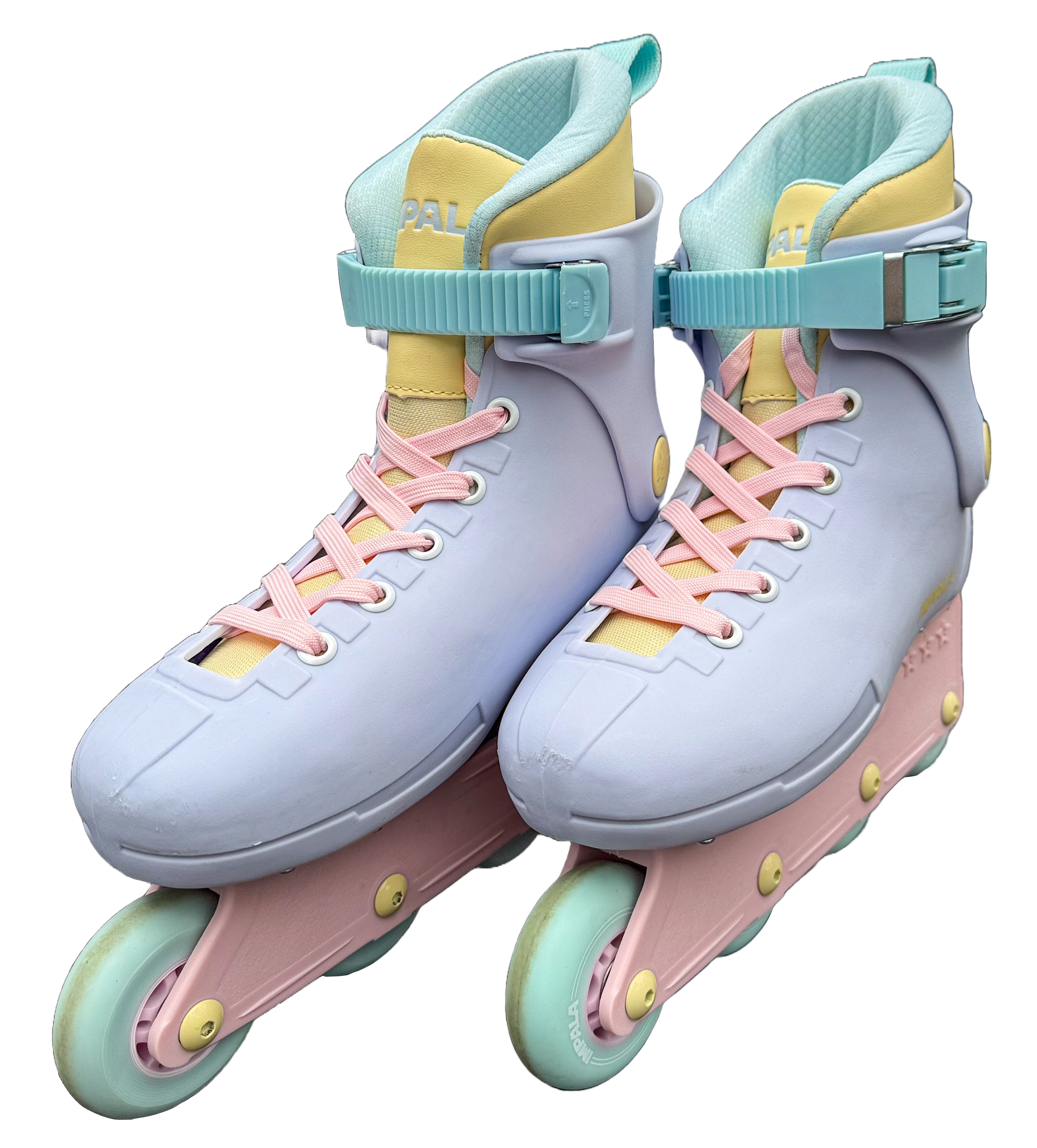
Recreational skates

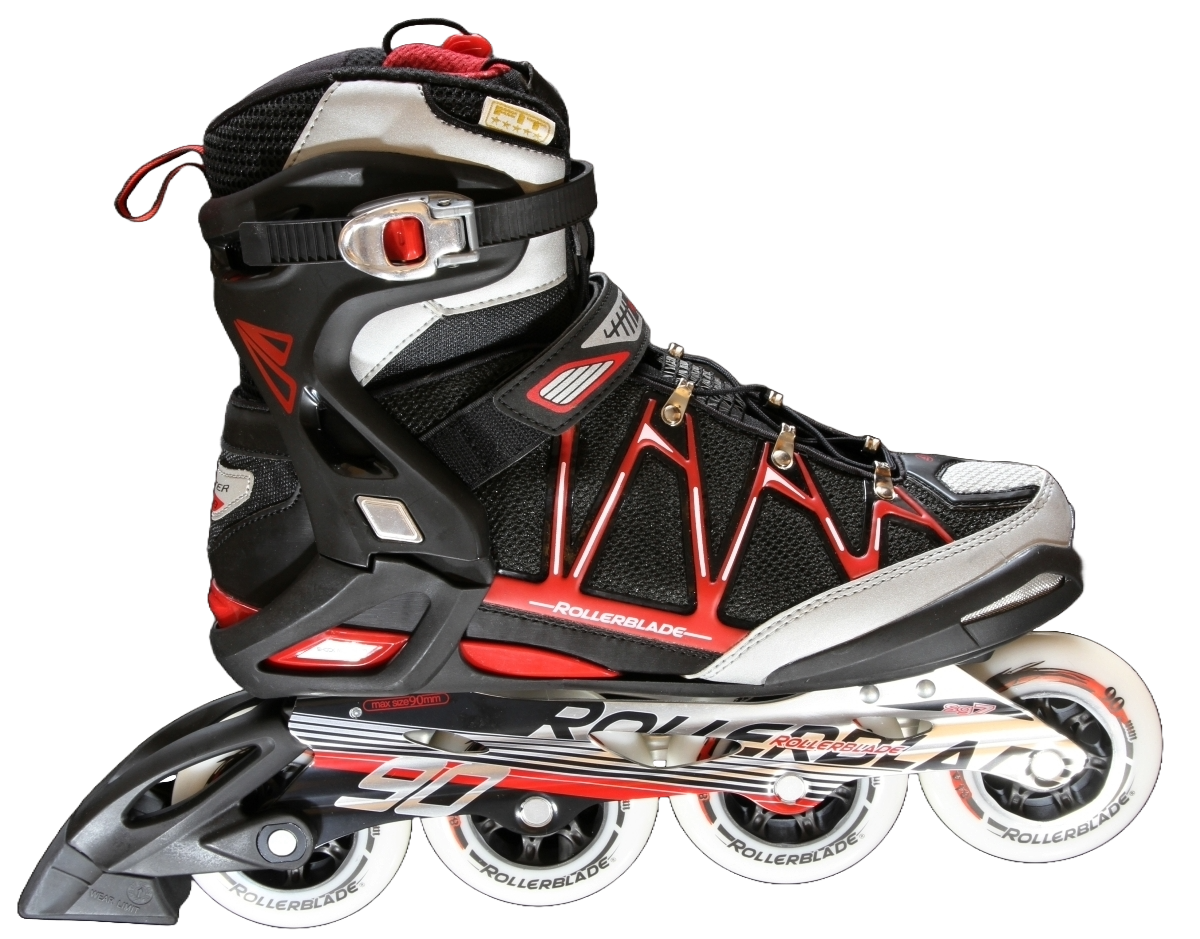
Fitness skates

Recreational skates constitute 90% of the inline skate market. The label "recreational" encompasses not only casual recreational uses but also fitness skating, which involves more frequent skating over longer distances, and requires more robust and efficient skates. Often the recreational skates category also caters to cross-training needs, with even hardier boots and frames, plus a wider range of options for wheels, among other features. Boundaries between these disciplines are blurry, with manufacturers and resellers marketing their skates in inconsistent ways. (Note: See catalog pages from various makers and resellers in Jan 2025, for wildly different ways they classify recreational, fitness and cross-training skates: Rollerblade (archived), Powerslide (archived), Roces (archived), K2 (archived), and Inline Warehouse (archived). See Ivo Vegter's Youtube video on the classifications of recreational skates.)

This category can be better understood as "unspecialized" inline skates, or generic skates. All other types of skates can be thought of as specialized deviations from this basic type. Recreational skates usually come with four wheels of average size, and a frame of average length, which is just slightly longer than the boot. This places the front wheel halfway ahead of the toe box, and the rear wheel halfway behind the heel pocket, a design that remained unchanged since Scott Olson's adoption of Super Sport Skate from 1979.

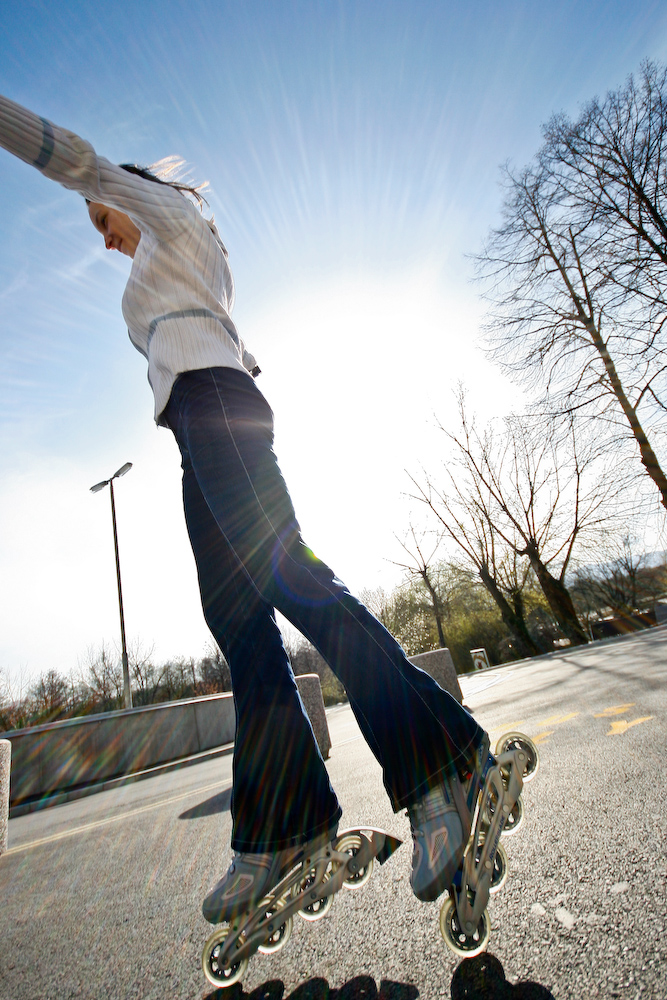
Skating at a park

Recreational skates are the default type of skates that a beginner finds comfortable and stable to skate on. The cheapest skates fall under this category. They are not necessarily of lower quality; they are simply mass-produced. As a beginner progresses, more expensive recreational skates are available with the same unspecialized characteristics, but now upgraded with more durable materials and hardware, possibly providing improved heel support, ankle support, and an enhanced skating experience. For instance, soft boots with an exoskeleton are usually the least expensive. Hard boots with removable liners are often priced higher. Hybrid boots with an endoskeleton are high-end models. Often, the higher-end models are marketed as "fitness skates" or as "cross-training skates".

Recreational skates are equipped with heel brakes. These allow beginners to learn to stop rolling, with a simple pivot of a foot on its heel. Heel brakes can usually be removed once a skater learns to stop rolling without them, using a skating move such as the T-stop.

Casual skaters and fitness skaters can be seen rolling alongside a creek, a lake, or a park on paved bike paths. Some also take to the streets, skating on bike lanes and paved roads.

== Aggressive ==
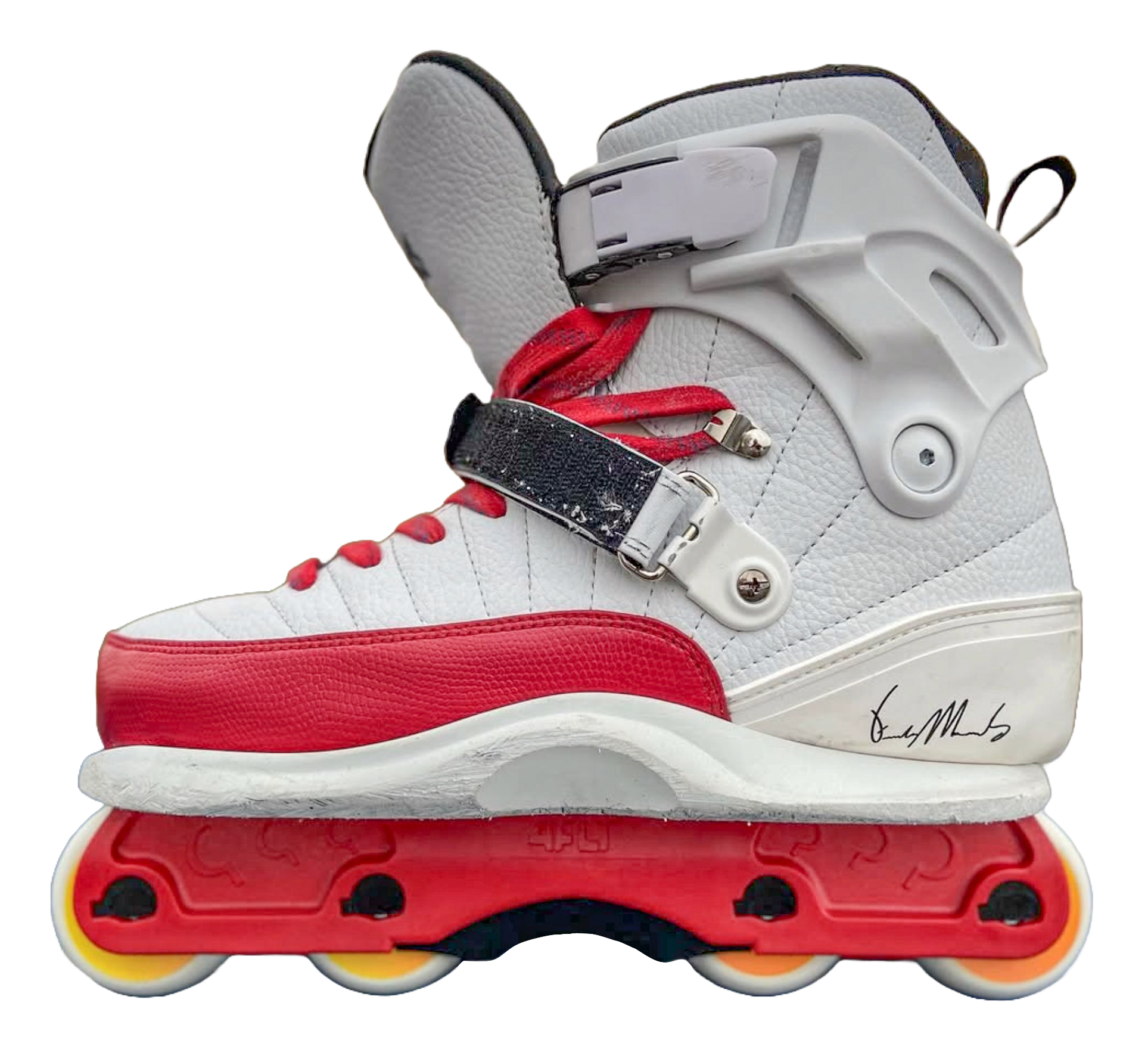
Gawds/Ground Control

Aggressive skates are the most specialized inline skates, in contrast to recreational skates. They are designed for one specific purpose only: grinds. Grinding is the art of sliding on street obstacles such as stairs, rails, benches, curbs, ramps and walls. To support a skater performing these stunts, aggressive skates are built with strong hard boots based on ski boots, as Olson originally did with his Ultimate Street Skates. These are bolted to thick frames which are fitted with the smallest wheels in all of inline skating. The smaller wheels bring the boot closer to the ground, making tricks and grinds easier to perform.

To help a skater lock onto an obstacle of interest during a grind, an aggressive skate provides channels and surfaces such as H-blocks, frame grooves, backslide grooves, grind plates, soulplates, etc. Transitioning between these stunts, a skater often jumps considerable heights, or rides down a long flight of stairs (known as stair bashing). Thus, aggressive boots are often fitted with shock absorbers to dampen shocks upon landing.

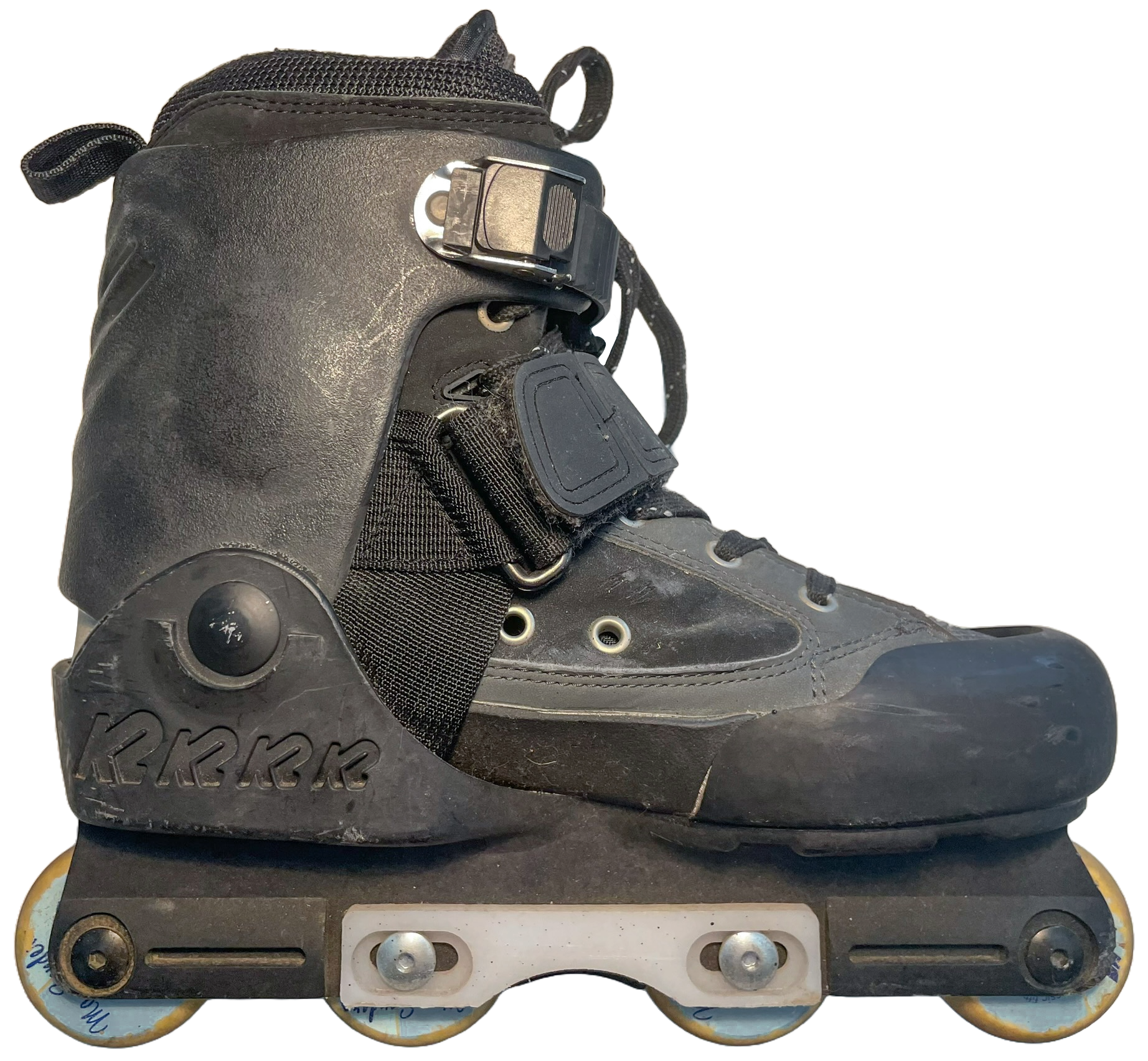
Grind plate on K2 Fatty

Aggressive skates co-evolved with the discipline which started as "inline stunts". It then turned into "streetstyle skating", and finally into aggressive inline skating.

Soon after the Rollerblade Lightning TRS was released in 1988, skaters experimented with extreme stunts on inline skates. Many took the axle wrench that came with Lightning TRS, and bolted it onto the frame as a makeshift grind plate. In the early days, frame grooves were formed on frames by the continuous grinding of frames on street obstacles. Inline skating books published on or before 1995 treated the discipline as stunt skating or street-style skating, following nomenclature from skateboarding. The word "street" in "street-style" meant that skaters performed tricks on and over "street obstacles".

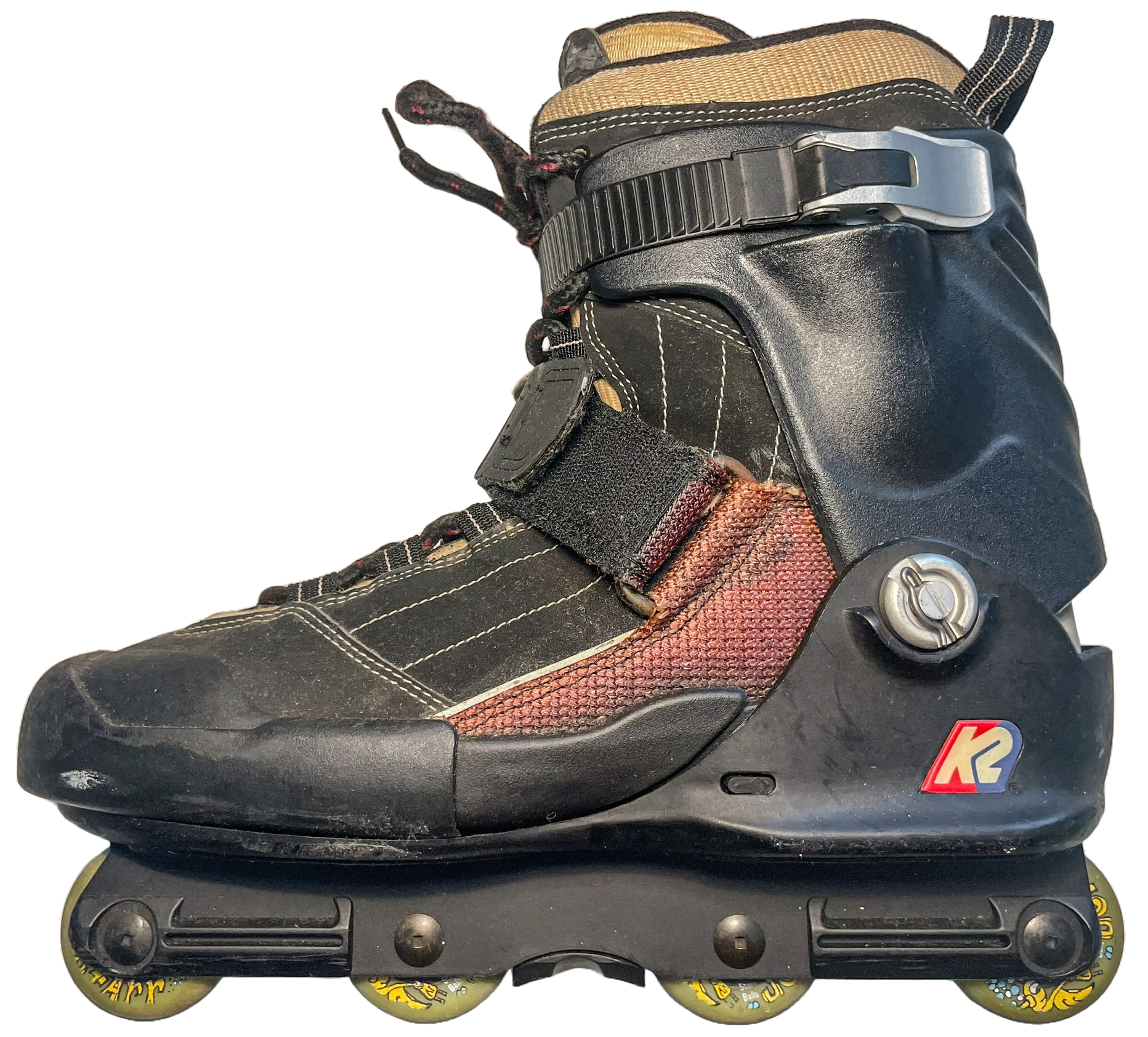
K2 SPB, 1998

In 1993, the movie Airborne came out, showcasing streetstyle inline skating to an entire country. In 1994, the video The Hoax: An Inline Crime was released by T-Bone Films, featuring icons such as Chris Edwards, Arlo Eisenberg, Chris Mitchell, Jess Dyrenforth, Pat Parnell, and others. Both videos inspired a new generation of young aggressive skaters. While skaters were still custom-modding their skates for aggressive skating, the Aggressive Skaters Association (ASA) was formed in 1994. Shortly after, ESPN X Games adopted aggressive inline skating in 1995 and ran aggressive competitions for 10 years, cementing the discipline.

Over time, aggressive skates evolved to incorporate even more mods by skaters. The frame walls were thickened to provide rigidity, and to allow skates to be inclined further during grinds, without incurring wheel bites. Frame grooves became a standard, and H-blocks were integrated. The two middle wheels were spaced farther apart, creating a larger split between these two wheels, to enhance grinding experiences.

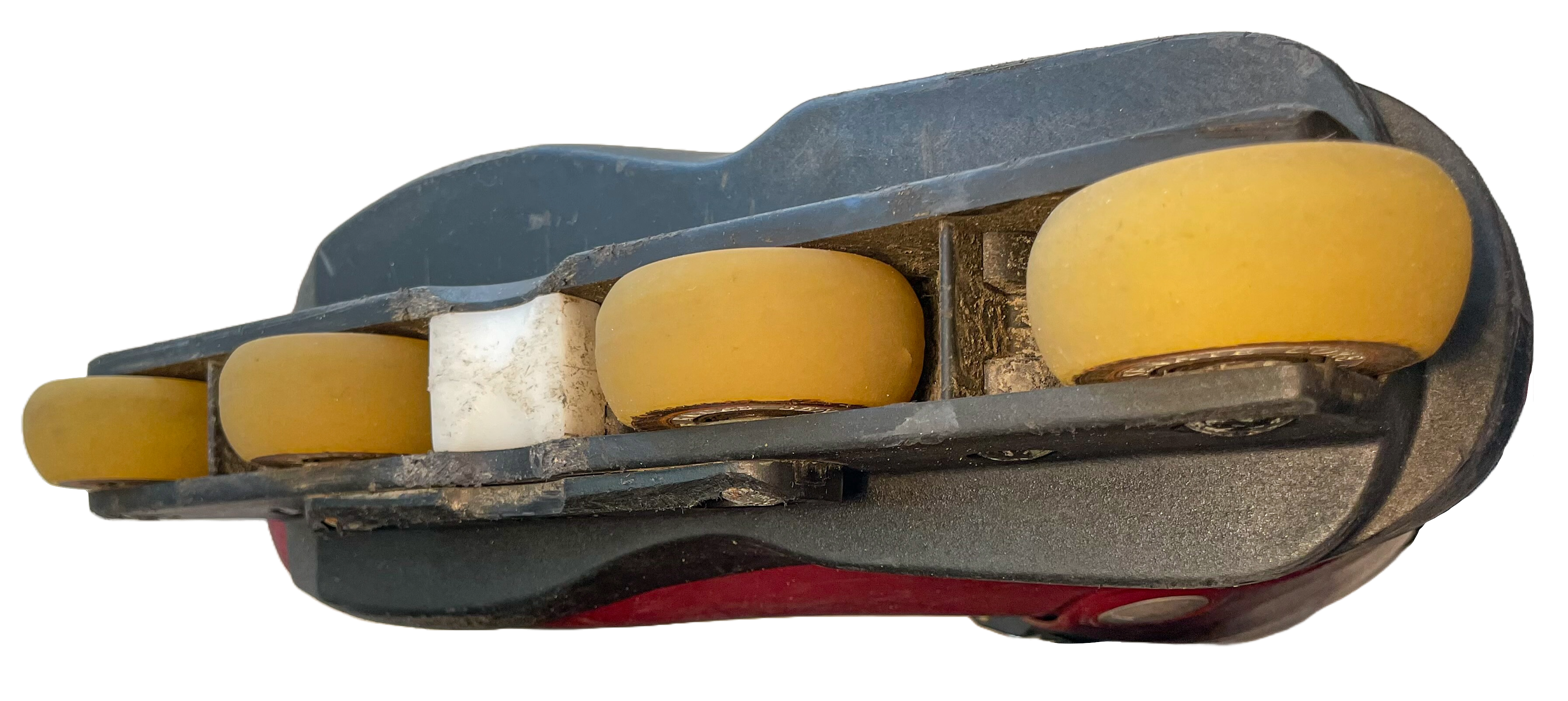
Roces 5th Element with H-block & single-piece soulplate, 1998

In 1996, Roces M12 (Majestic 12) was launched, with small wheels, a boot closer to the ground, a large gap between two middle wheels, and an H-block. Soon, the M12 became synonymous with aggressive skates. In 1997, makers such as USD introduced integrated soulplates (also soul plates, from sole plates), providing a platform for soul grinds using the bottom of the boot, rather than the frame. Backslide grooves were eventually introduced, to allow even greater skate inclination during grinds. By 2003, the soulplate became a single-piece, flat platform in Roces M12, with an even wider boot bottom to further enhance soul grinding. From then on, inline skating books dedicated entire chapters to aggressive skates and skating.

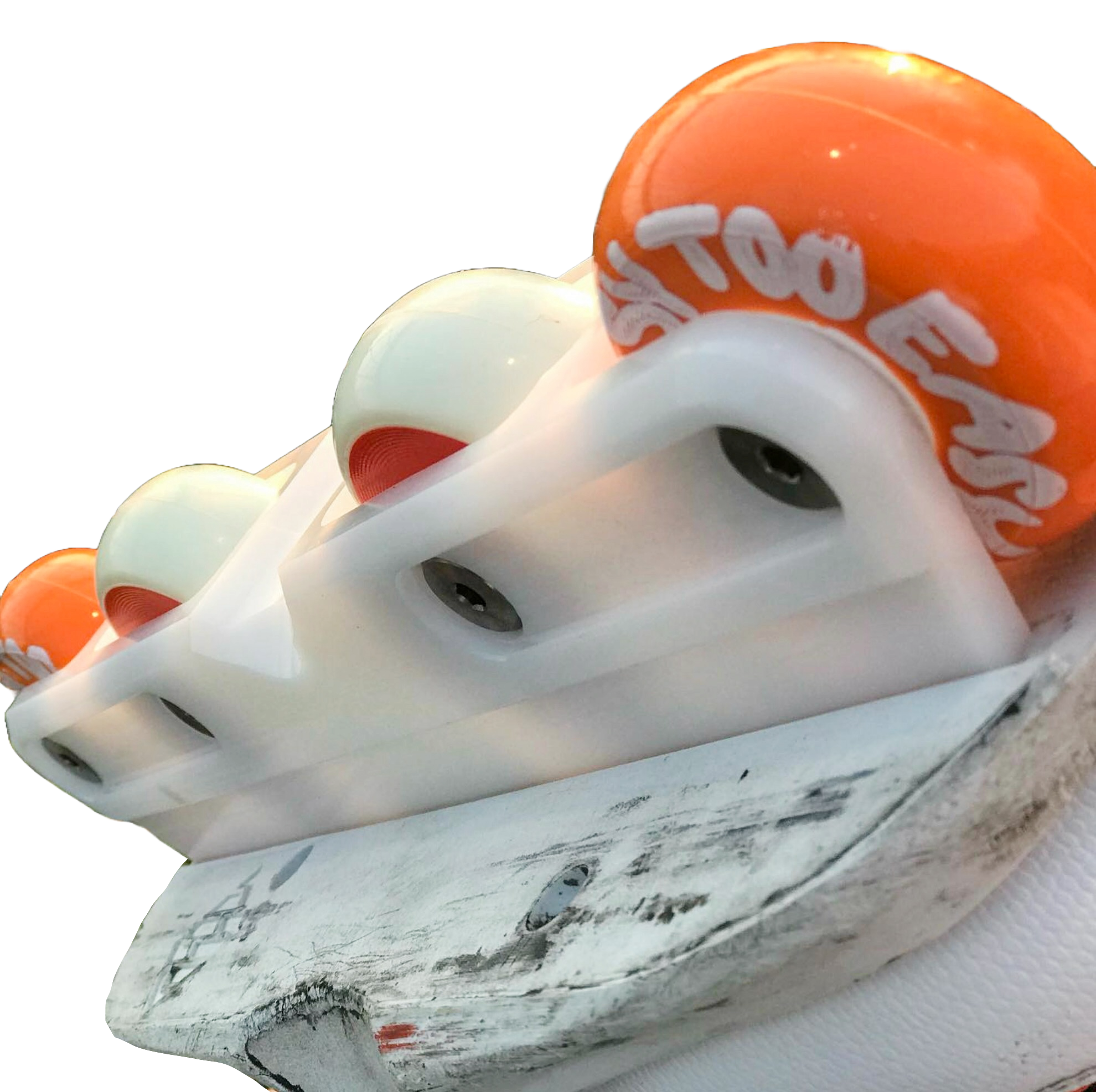
Frame groove and thick frame walls

In 2001, aggressive skate manufacturers standardized on UFS (Universal Frame System), the first replaceable mounting standard for inline skates. Most UFS frames accommodate small wheels up to 60 mm. Some UFS frames with frame grooves and H-blocks are designed with thick walls to prevent wheel bites. These frames can be used with a flat wheel setup, where all wheels touch the ground. Other UFS frames without prevention measures against wheel bites can be set up with an anti-rocker wheel configuration. The second and third wheels are replaced with even smaller "grindwheels" (or "antirockers") made of hard plastic that are resistant to wheel bites. Some skaters go one step further, eliminating the two inner wheels altogether. Instead of wheels, "juice blocks" are installed to keep the structural integrity of the frame walls.

Aggressive skates come with no brakes. It is assumed that skaters are able to stop without brakes, as they grind on street obstacles (termed "street skating"), perform stunts at skateparks (termed "park skating"), and take to the air at the top of vert ramps (termed "vert skating"). Brakes only hinder aggressive maneuvers.

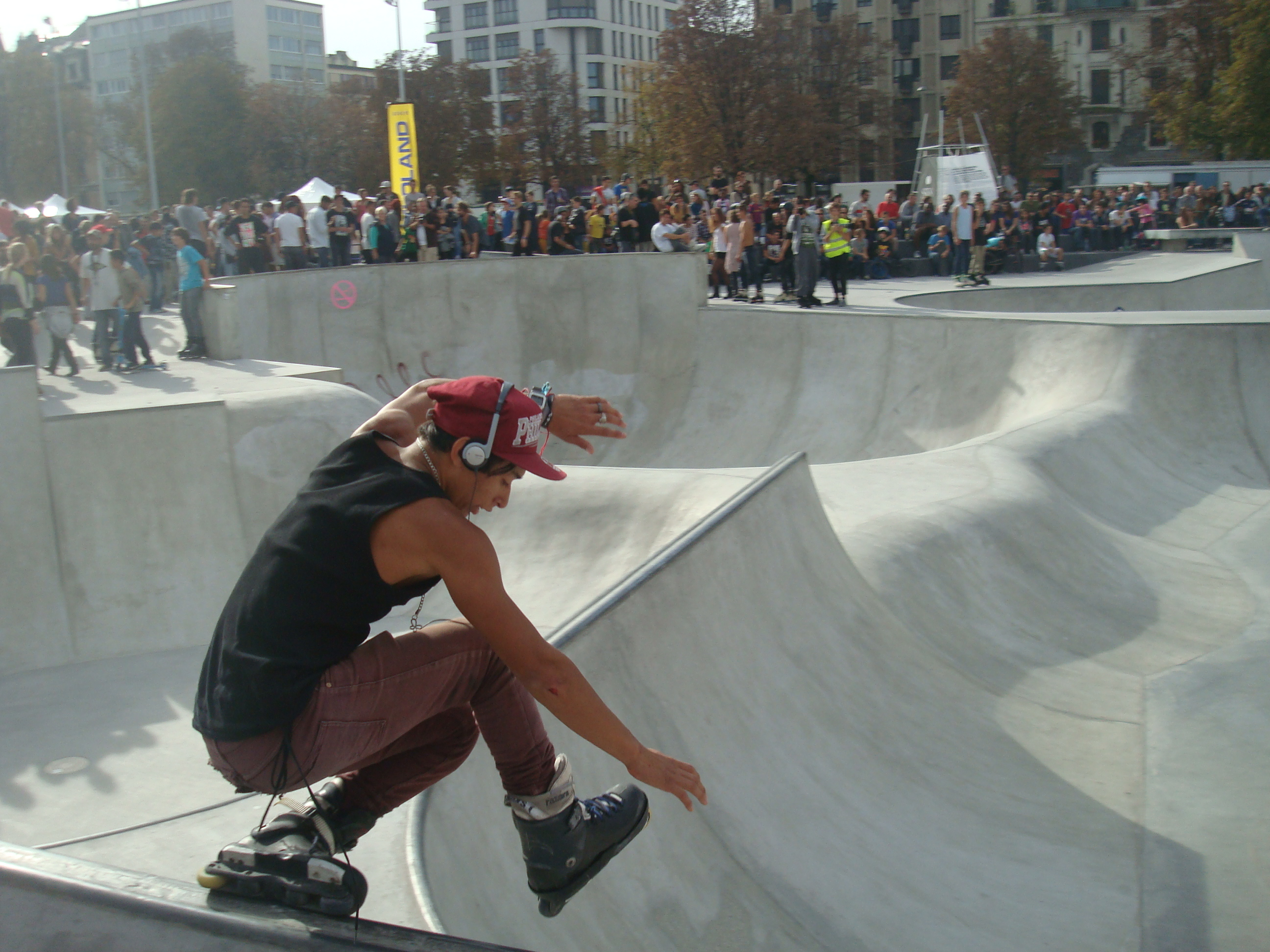
Aggressive competition in Geneva

The name "aggressive" has been controversial outside the core community of aggressive skaters. Even within the core community, debates continue to this day on alternative naming. Many in the community call aggressive skating "rollerblading" (or simply "blading"), and thus members "bladers". Others call it "aggro". (Note: Page 77 of Skaters magazine from 1990 featured an ad by Rollerblade on "Aggro Culture", an alternative term for aggressive inline skating. It urged readers to send $4 for an "Aggro Culture Poster". It's not clear whether Rollerblade promoted this term beyond 1990.) Some skate manufacturers eschew the label "aggressive", choosing to market their aggressive skates instead as "street skates" or "park skates". For instance, Rollerblade Inc. called this discipline "extreme skating" in its 1991 official guidebook, Wheel Excitement. Even after the aggressive competitions from X Games in 1995, Rollerblade Inc. continued to call it "extreme skating", in its 2000 book: Superguides: Inline Skating. The company marketed these skates as "Street Skates" all these years, to this day, almost 30 years after the X Games. (Note: See archived product pages from Rollerblade: 2011 page showing a selection of Rollerblade "Street Skates", 2016 selection, and 2024 selection.)

== Hockey ==
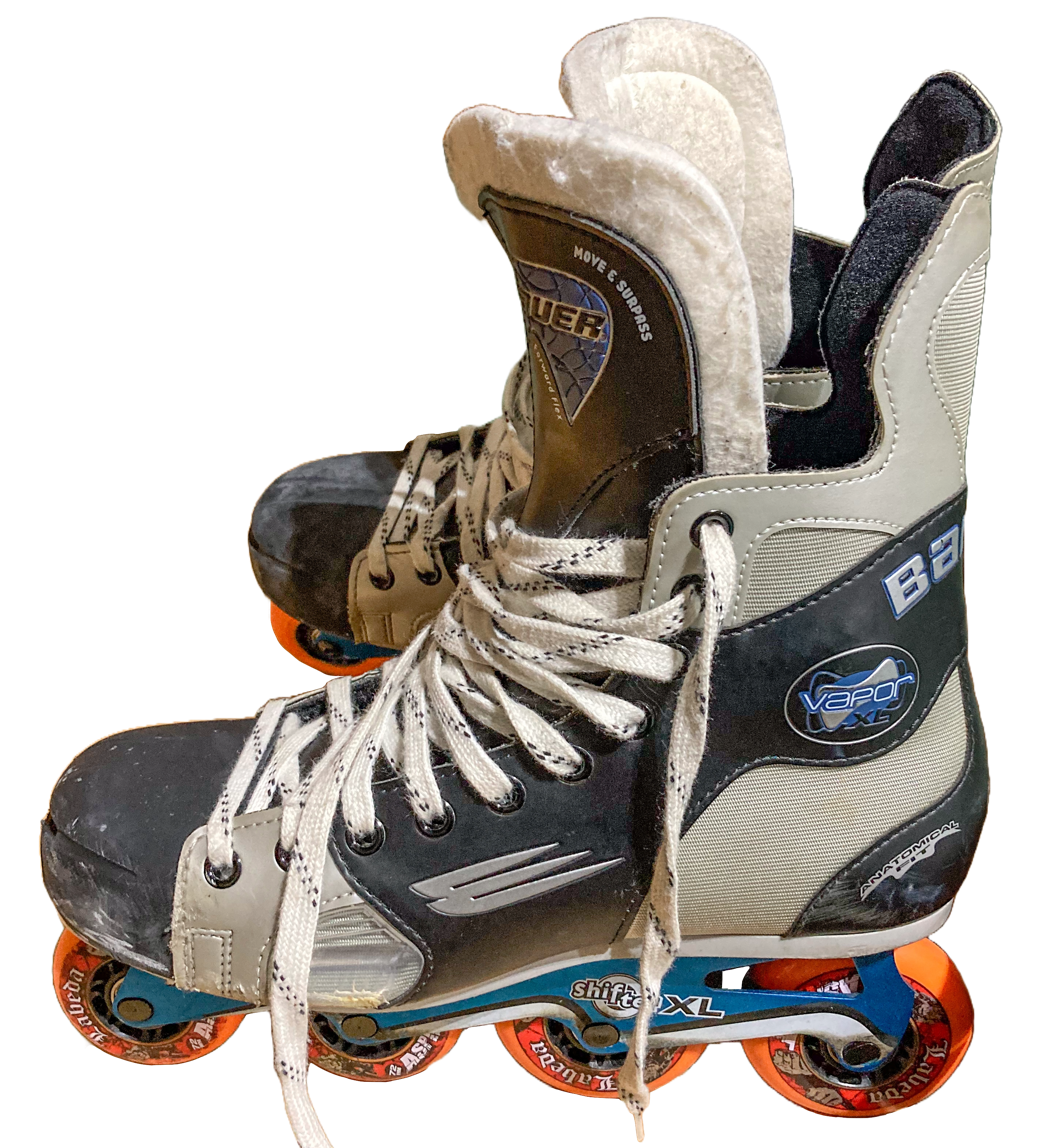
Bauer hockey skate

In the 21st century, skates for inline hockey (roller hockey) use a construction process for the boot that differs significantly from other inline skates. They are mainly made by ice hockey manufacturers such as CCM, Bauer (Mission), True, Marsblade, etc. (Note: See inline hockey skates made by ice hockey manufacturers, archived here: CCM Super Tacks 9370R, Bauer Vapor 3X Pro, Mission Inhaler WM02, True TF9 Roller Hockey Skate, and Marsblade R1 Kraft Crew.) In many instances the same boots are fitted with a blade holder for ice hockey, and an inline frame for roller hockey. (Note: Refer to this video showing the production process of a Bauer hockey skate (both ice and inline), corresponding to the US patent 7,316,083. See FIG. 9: an exploded view showing components used in the construction of a traditional hockey skate in the 2010s.) (Note: See US patent 7,039,977 filed by Mission Hockey in 2003, showing the same hockey boot construction, mounted on an ice blade (FIG. 1), and on a wheeled frame (FIG. 2).) As a consequence, inline hockey skates continue to use the same rivet-based mounting system from ice hockey. This is unlike other inline skates which have largely moved on, now adopting standard mounting systems such as UFS, 165mm, 195mm and Trinity, with replaceable frames for all but entry-level skates.

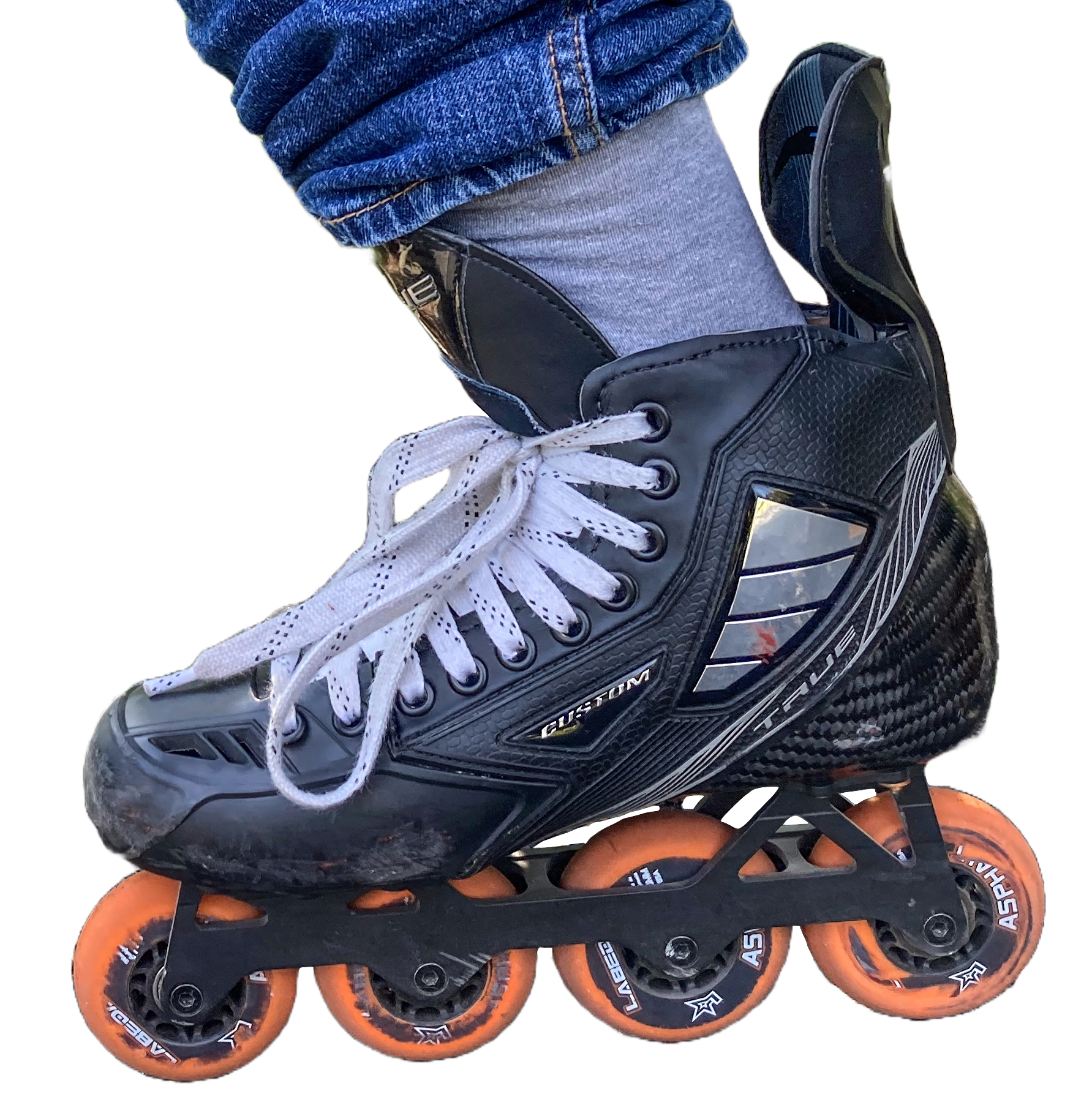
Hi-lo setup with 80 mm rear & 76 mm front wheels

Hockey frames, wheel choices, and wheel setups reflect the specific needs of the game. Hockey skates adopt some of the shortest frames in all inline skates, to allow a player to turn hard on a dime, and to do crossovers unhindered. Hockey boots are kept as low to the ground as possible, only allowing their frames to accommodate smallish wheels, in order to deliver the best stability for hard edging maneuvers. The largest wheels used are 80 mm which would be the smallest ones found in recreational skates. Wheels with a rounder profile are preferred, to support sharp edging and turning, without the skate sliding out from under a player.

Hockey skates often incorporate a hi-lo wheel setup through the deliberate use of wheels with different diameters (e.g. 80-78-76-74 mm), or by having its frame explicitly support such setup (typically 80-80-76-76 mm). A hi-lo setup places larger wheels at the rear, and smaller wheels in front, while all wheels touch the ground. This raises the heel higher, and pushes the toe cap lower, thus the name hi-lo. It causes a player to forward flex naturally, for greater stability and stronger strokes.

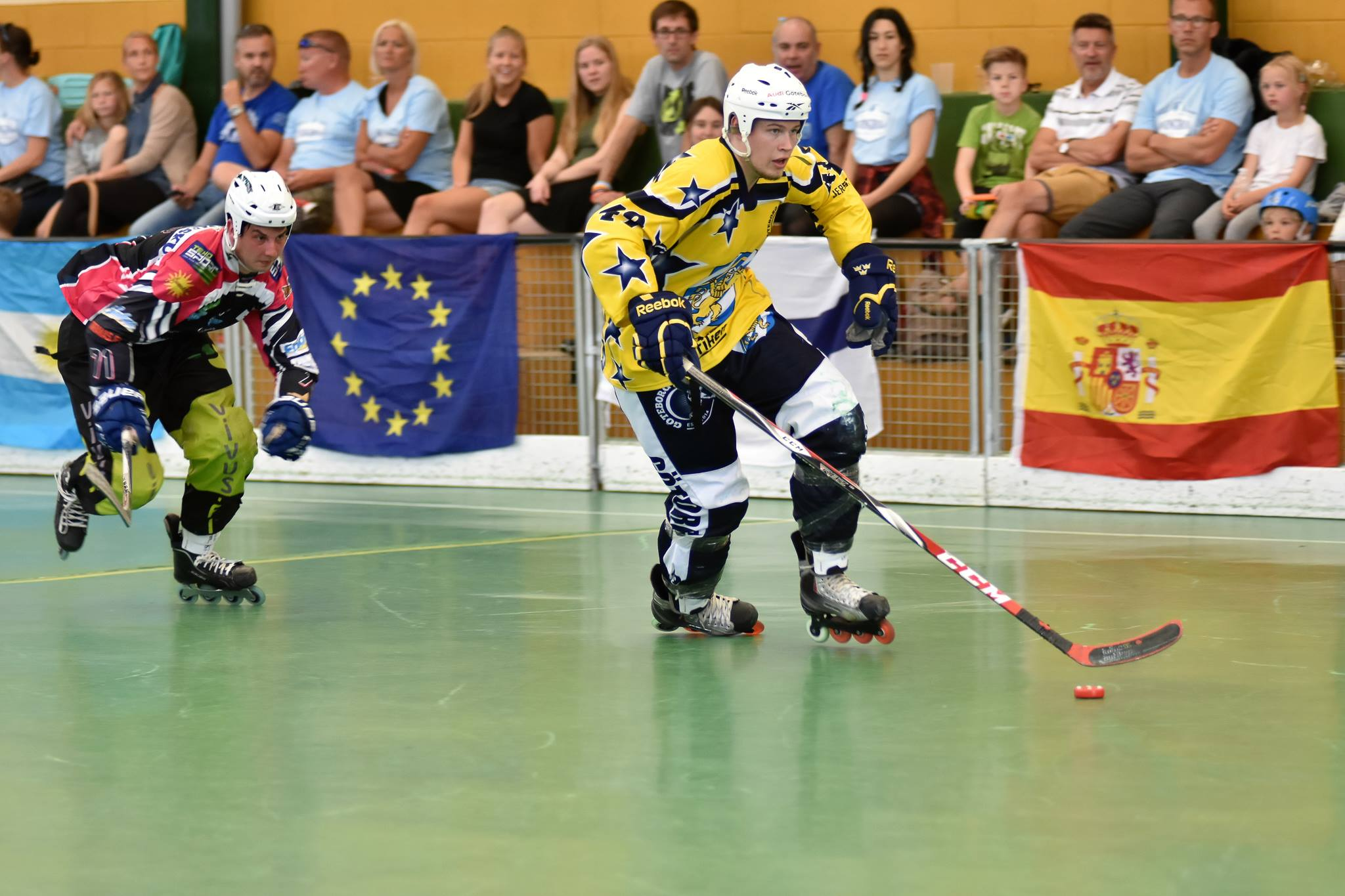
Inline hockey in Sweden

Inline skates started as a wheeled equivalent of ice hockey skates, when Olson adopted molded plastic hockey boots that Lange just introduced to the ice hockey world. This type of hard boot construction, with a pivoting cuff and a removable liner, as typified by the 1988 Rollerblade Lightning, evolved into many types of inline skates over four decades. Yet ironically, neither ice hockey nor roller hockey ended up adopting hard-shell boots nor hinged cuffs. (Note: See background section discussion on why hard boots with hinged cuff and thick liners do not work to either ice hockey or roller hockey, in US patent 7,039,977 from Bauer/Mission.)

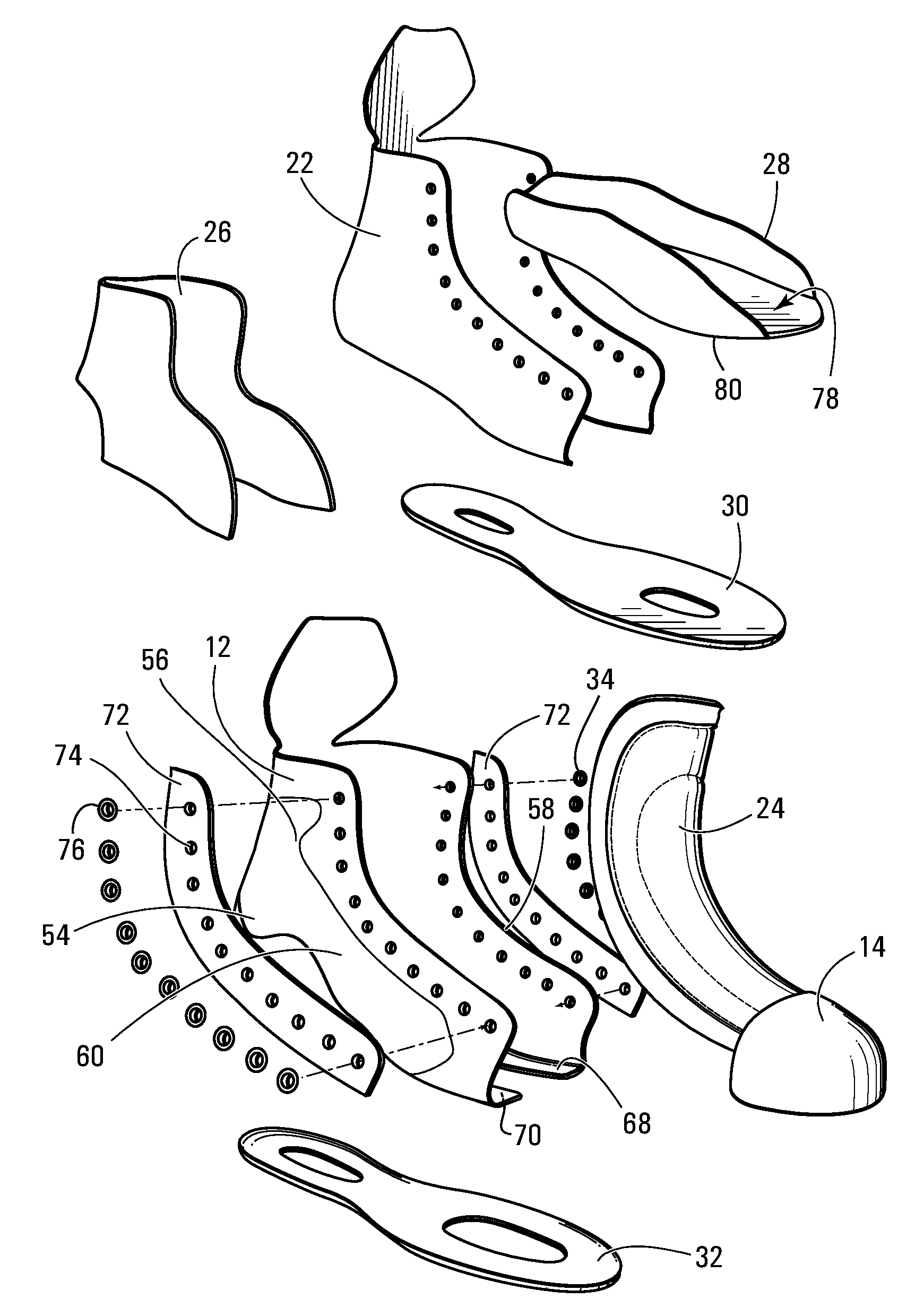
Hockey boot construction

The rigor of a hockey game requires that inline hockey skates be made as lightweight as economically possible. At the same time, these skates must deliver superior heel support and ankle support. In addition, power transfer from foot to wheels needs to be direct and instantaneous. Traditional inline hockey skates achieve these by creating an unyielding wall, with anatomical contours that hug the heel and both sides of the ankle. This wall is known as a quarter package comprising left and right quarter panels, and it is bolted to a rigid outsole platform. The wall and its connection to the outsole is reinforced, often with an injection-molded thermoplastic piece sewed into the wall, and then nailed, tacked or glued to the outsole.

The rest of the boot is built around the quarter package, with a thick tongue to support the shin for an aggressive athletic stance, along with an reinforced toe cap. The entire boot is thus designed to protect a foot from flying pucks. The boot is furnished with an integrated and non-removable liner with varied thickness at places, to further deliver an anatomical fit. Hockey skates use eyelets and laces, not buckles or straps. Players often use waxed laces, which grip the eyelets firmly, allowing players to selectively tighten and loosen laces around particular eyelets based on needs. Typically, the toe area is laced comfortably, the middle eyelets are laced tight to ensure proper heel lock, and the upper eyelets are left looser to allow for ankle mobility (forward flex).

Thus, traditional hockey boots are not hard boots with removable liners. They are not soft boots with an exoskeleton. Traditional hockey boots may be constructed in a fashion similar to hybrid soft boots, but they are not soft anywhere, and eschew hinged cuffs for contoured quarter panels. Hockey boots are in a class of its own.

== Speed ==
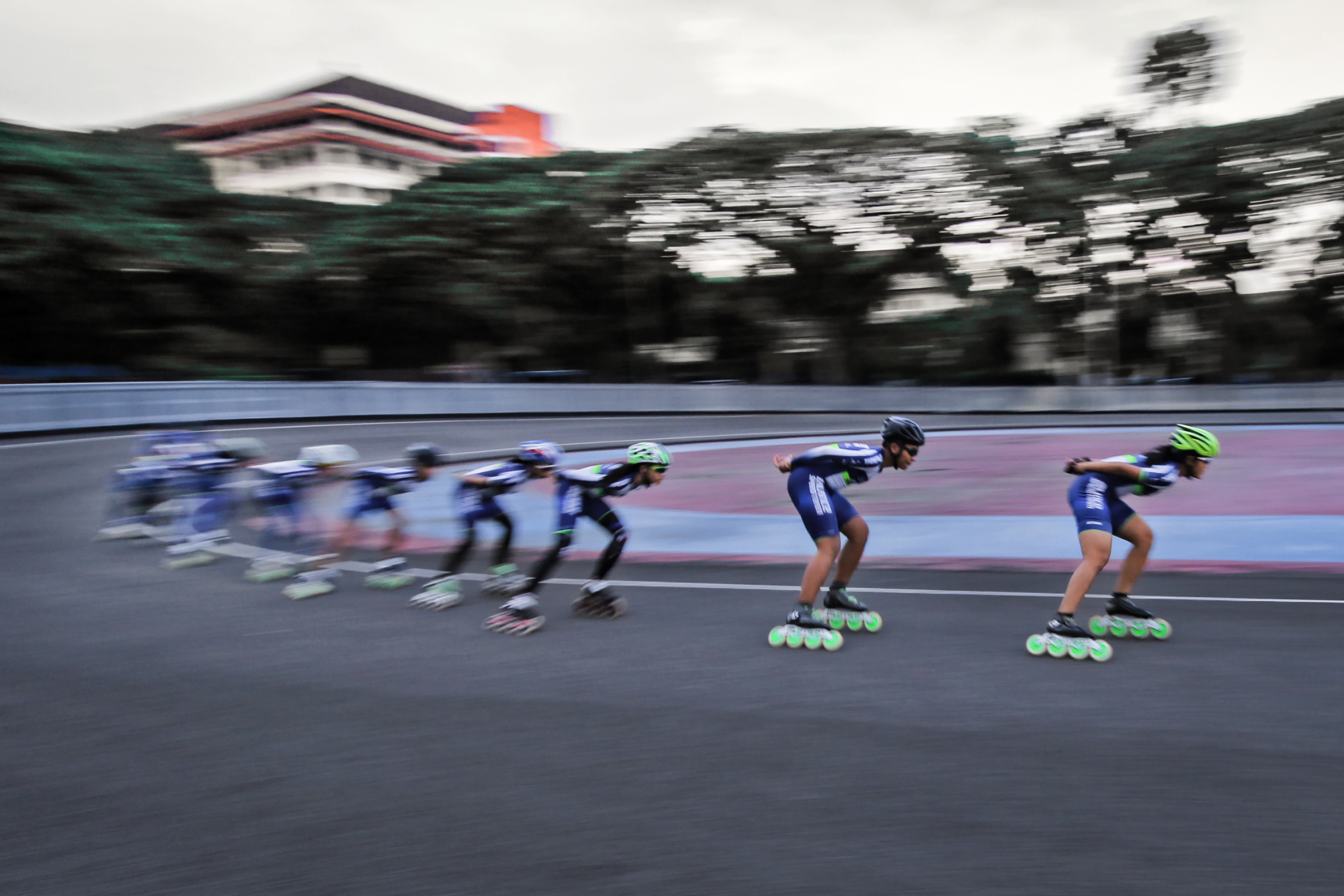
Inline racing

Speed skates (or race skates) are purpose-built inline skates with a single goal: speed. To this end, speed skates need to enable a racer to generate the most efficient strides and to glide with the least amount of friction. The distance for a race ranges from a few hundred meters to 100 kilometers. And a race may take place indoors on tracks, or outdoors on paved roads. World records for outdoor races exceed 27 miles per hour. For instance, Joey Mantia holds the world record for the outdoor 10-kilometers race from 2009, at 13 minutes and 46.801 seconds.

Speed skating differs from other inline disciplines in that a speed skater tilts her body trunk forward for up to 60° when racing, positioning her head far ahead of the skates in order to reduce her body profile with respect to air resistance. A speed skater bends her knees aggressively for up to 80° in a deep-seated squatting position, much more than other disciplines. Such body configuration requires a deep forward leaning of the shin (dorsiflexion) for proper balance. This deep squatting posture produces the most powerful push-offs, with the farthest displacement of the pushing skate.

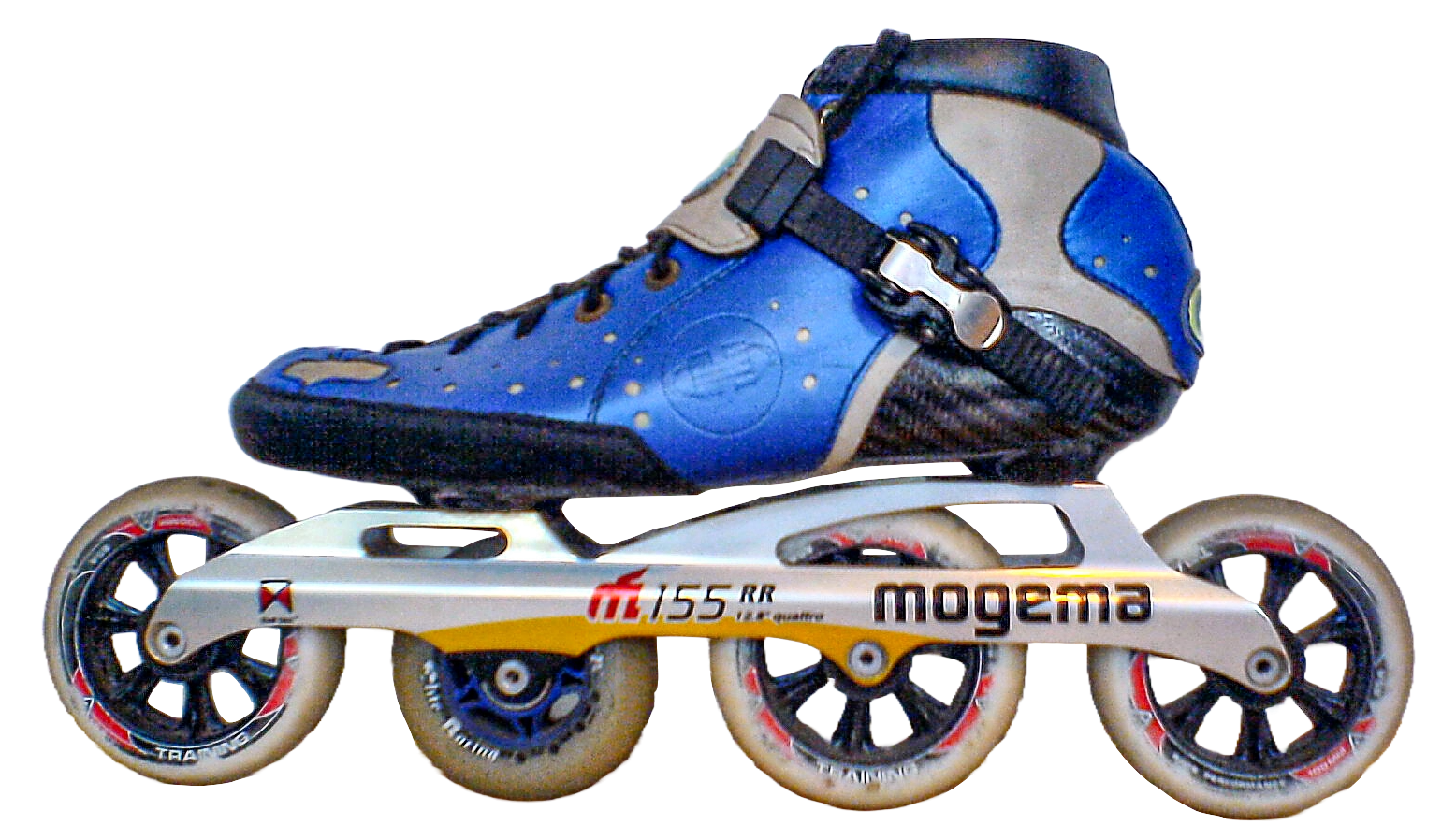
Mogema M55 speed skate with three 100 mm wheels and one 84 mm wheel

Because of the need for a deep dorsiflexion, speed skates have no eyelets, buckles, or straps above middle eyelets at 45° angle which is the minimum requirement for proper heel lock. Indeed, speed skates have no shafts and cuffs commonly found in other inline skates. In order for racers to freely flex their foot around ankle bones, speed boots are cut the lowest among all inline skates, around or below the ankle bones.

A skater compensates for the lack of lateral ankle support from boots by strengthening muscle support for proper ankle movements such as dorsiflexion, pronation and supination, which are essential for double push strides with aggressive push-offs and precise transitions from outside to inside edges. The removal of shaft and cuff significantly reduces a boot's weight, a key advantage to a skater in a game where a saving of fractional seconds makes a difference.

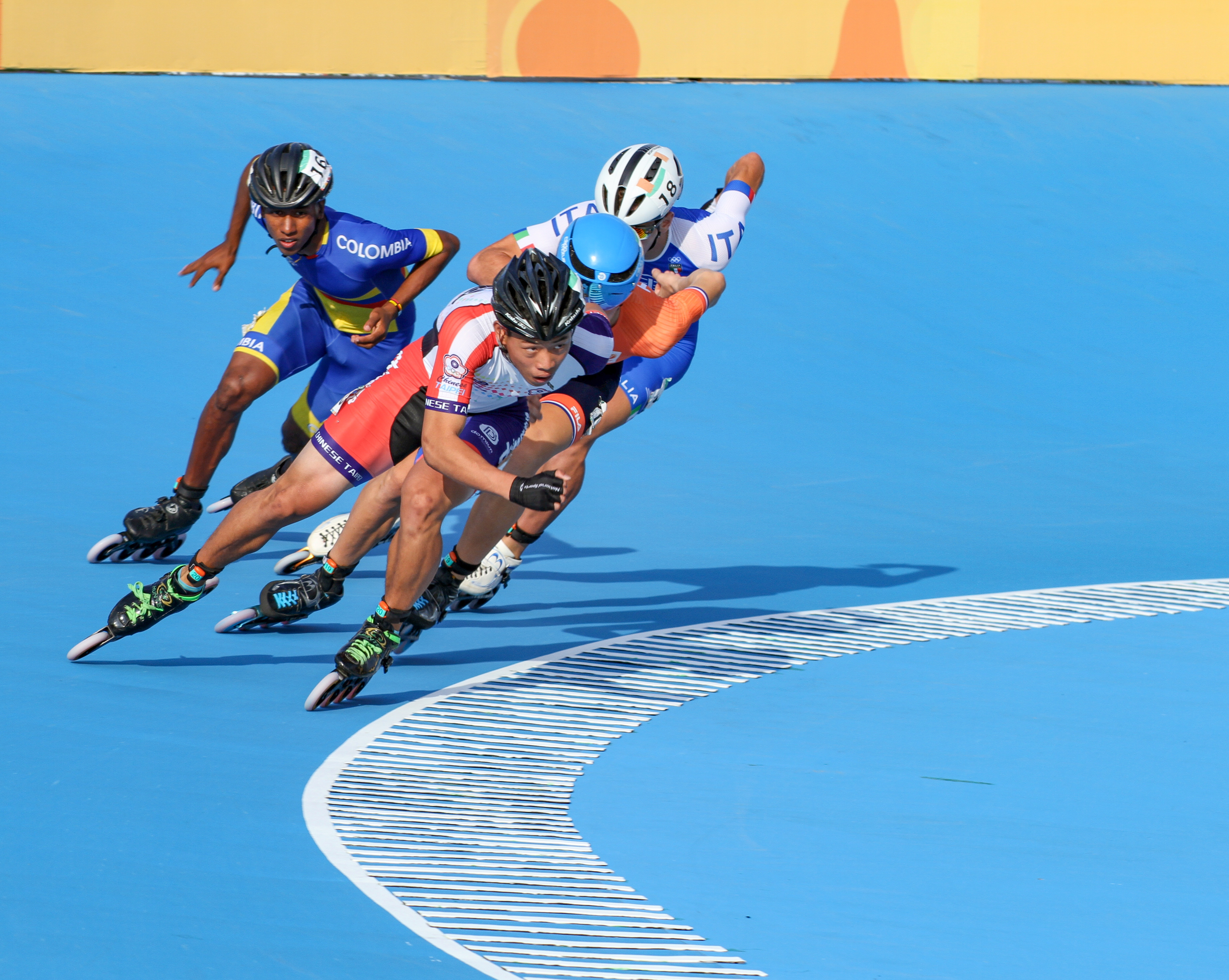
2018 Summer Youth Olympics

A speed skate boot is close-fitting, without much padding, and usually made of leather, carbon fiber, or other strong and lightweight composite materials. For best performance, the boot must conform closely to the shape of the foot to prevent it from moving inside the boot. Thus, most boots are custom-fitted or else heat-moldable. (Note: Refer to this video showing the production process of a speed skate with a custom-molded carbon-fiber shell (both ice and inline).)

The frame may be made of aircraft-quality aluminum, magnesium, or possibly lightweight carbon fiber. All frames flex during skating. A stiff frame flexes very little, so it transmits power from the foot to the wheels more directly. A shorter frame navigates tight curves at smaller tracks better but may become wobbly at high speeds. A longer frame provides stable tracking at high speed and increased power transfer, useful for long-distance events.

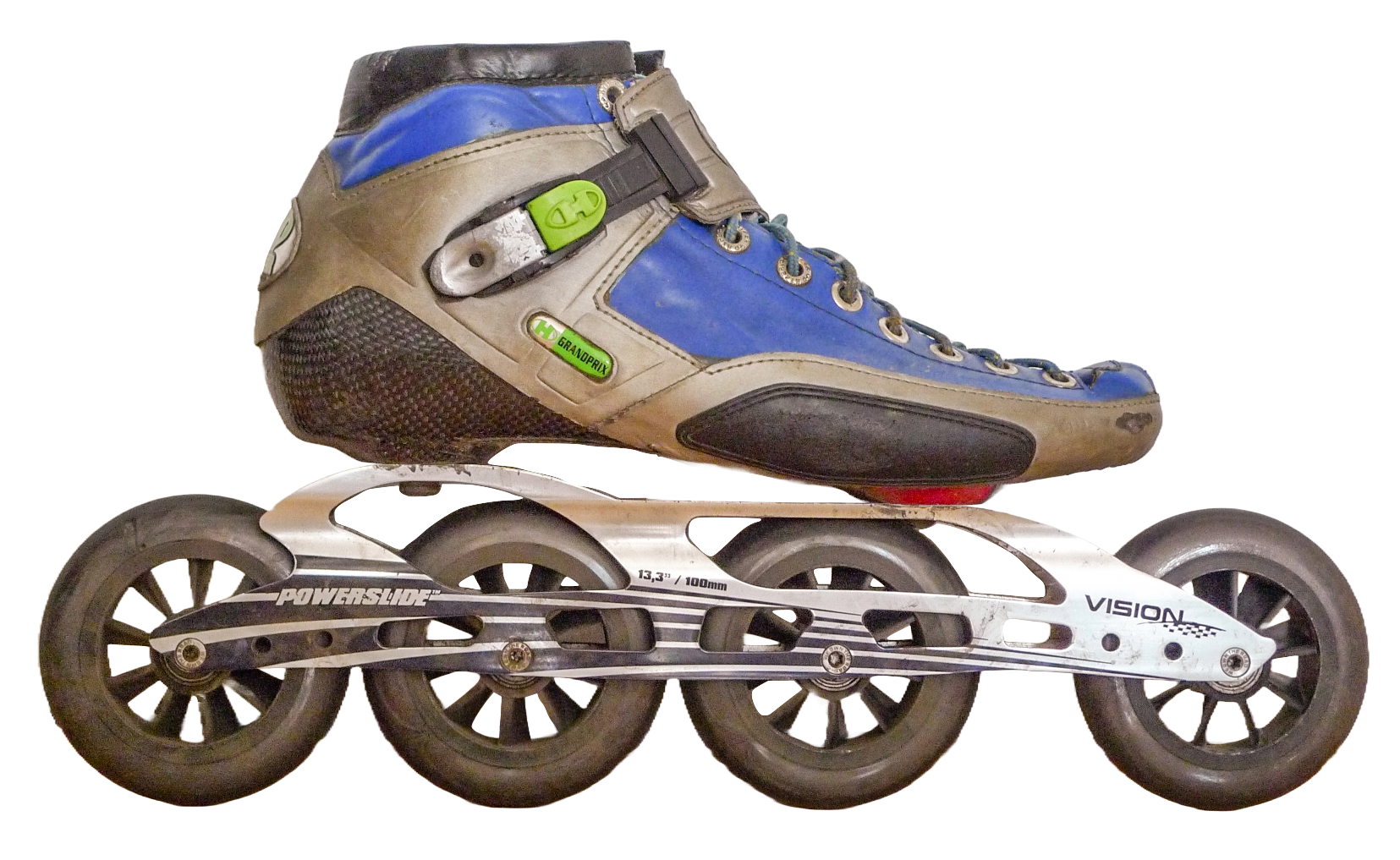
Setup with 100 and 90 mm wheels

The length and height of a frame determine the number and size of wheels it can accommodate. More wheels and bigger wheels increase mass, making acceleration harder and slower. But once rolling at speed, a skater can more easily maintain top speed given the rotational inertia. In the 1990s, speed skaters preferred a frame with five wheels, usually 80 mm in diameter (i.e. 5x80mm). In the 21st century, wheel size ranges from 90 mm to 125 mm. A setup with four 110 mm wheels (4x110mm) is typical for competitive speed skating, and three 125 mm wheels (3x125mm) for marathon skates at marathon events.

Speed skates generally adopt either the 165mm or the 195mm mounting standard for securing a frame to a boot. Short speed frames for short track racing use the 165mm standard, while long frames for marathon use the 195mm standard in order to better accommodate larger wheels. Both of these 2-point mounting standards feature a built-in heel lift that pitches a skater forward, creating forward flex.

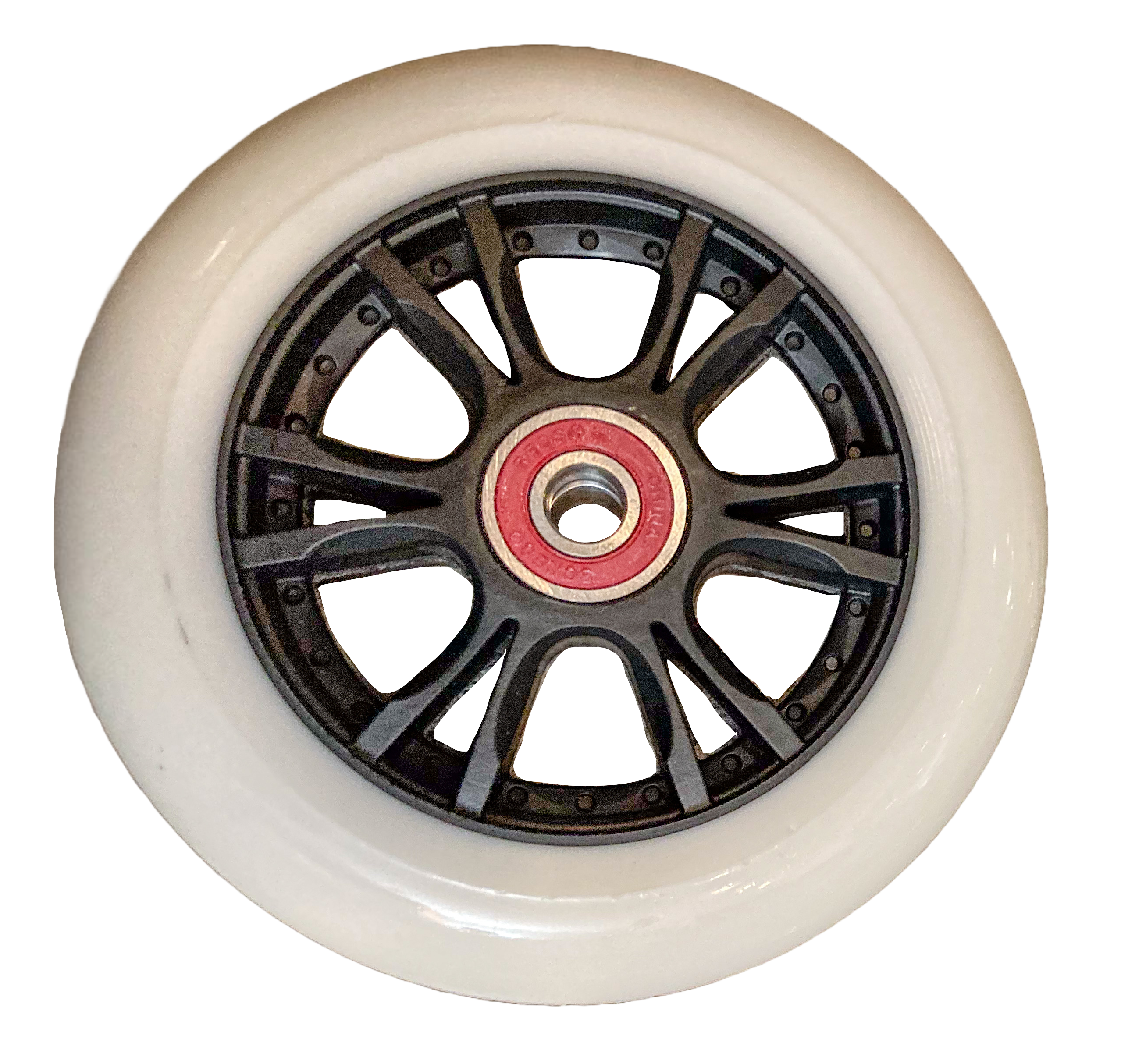
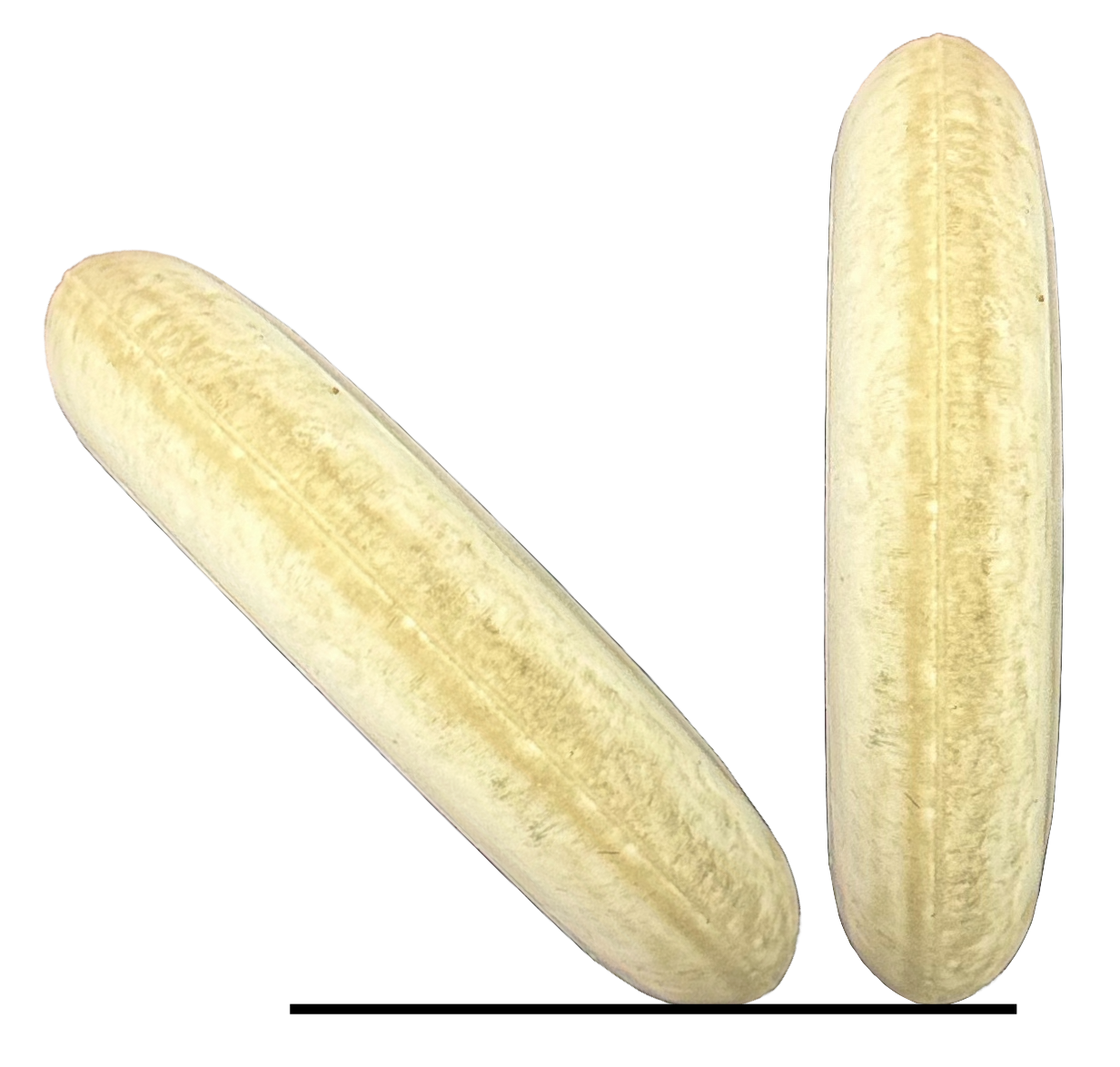
Bullet profile: striding vs gliding

Speed skating generally adopts harder wheels than other disciplines. Harder wheels minimize energy lost to elastic hysteresis when a skater's weight deforms wheels upon ground contact. Speed skaters prefer wheels with high rebound, which returns the compression energy back to the skater. Speed wheels have a pointy bullet profile that reduces friction from drags, when a skate glides and its wheels touch the road upright. The elliptical contour of the bullet profile, however, affords greater contact surface for improved traction and control, when a skate is inclined on an edge during push-offs.

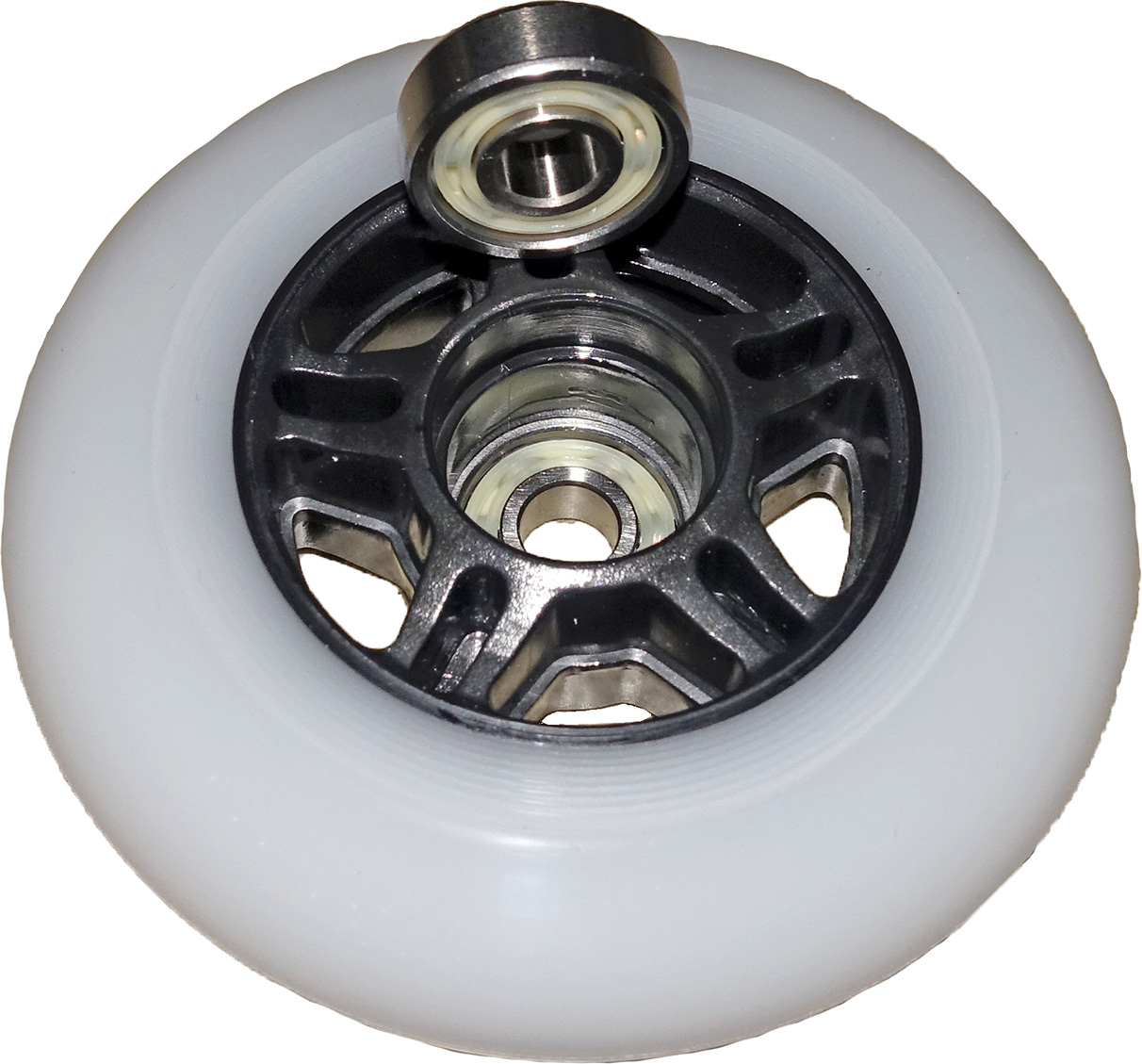
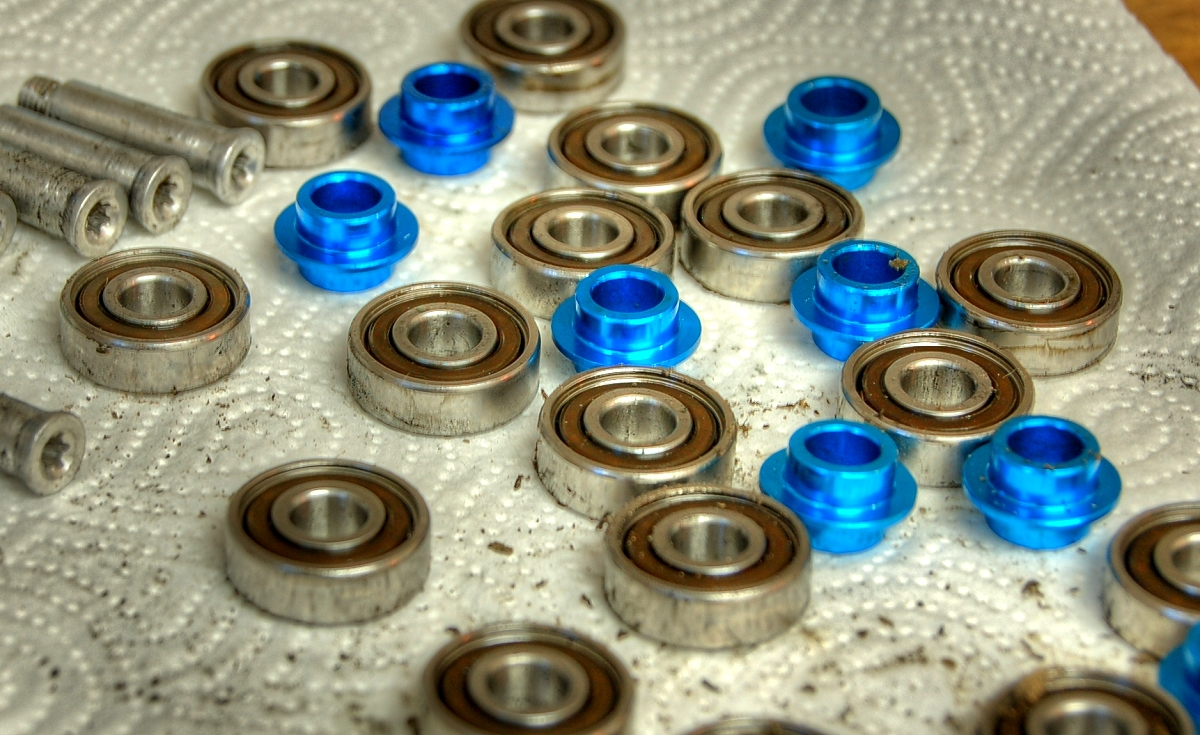
Wheel and bearings

Speed skaters pay close attention to the quality of ball bearings and their periodic maintenance. High-quality bearings with precision ratings are the minimum requirement. Regular cleaning and lubrication of these bearings remove trapped dirt and restore them to their optimal performance, which is essential in the pursuit of ultimate speed.

== Urban ==
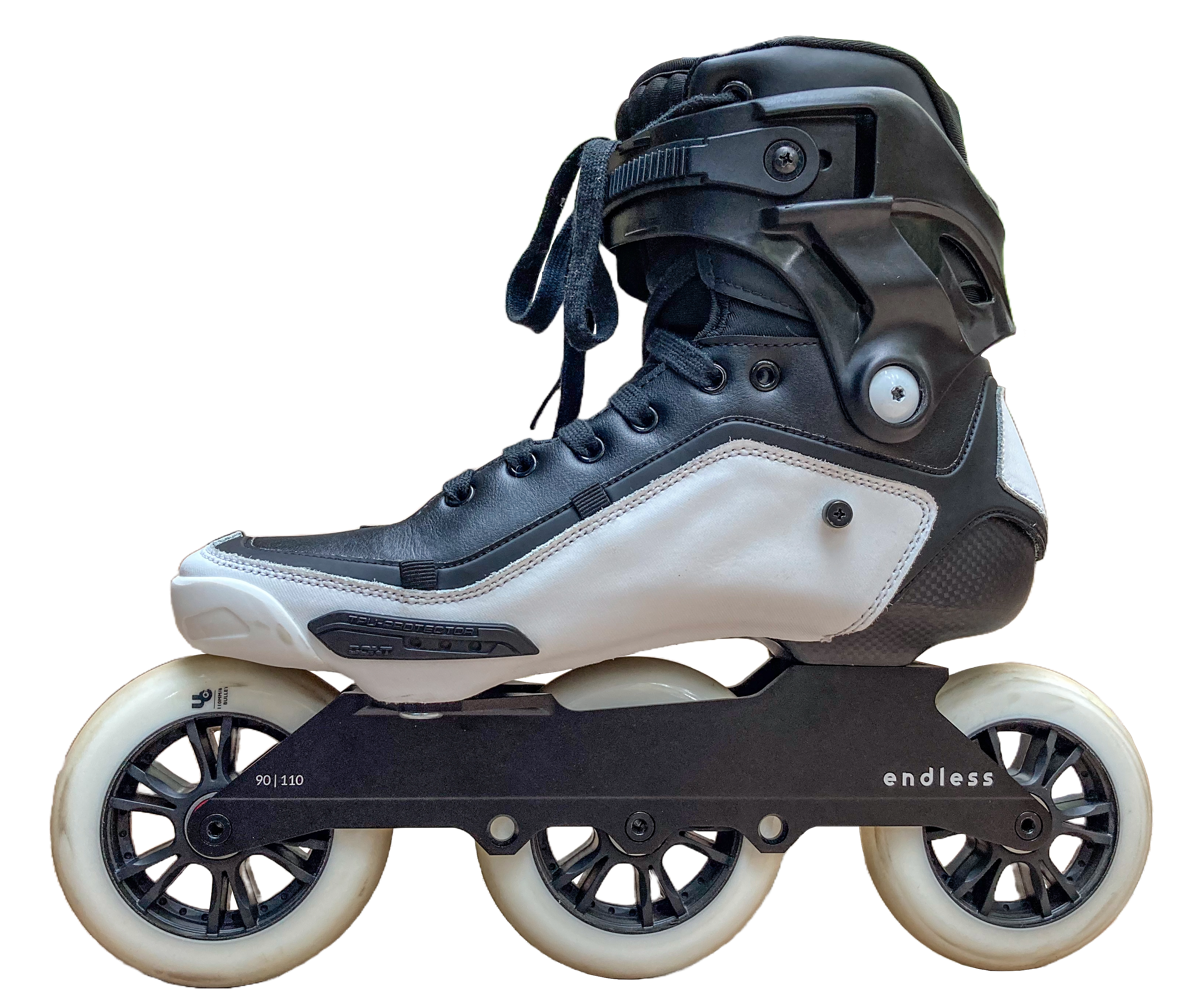
Urban skate with 3 big wheels

Urban skate is an umbrella term created by the industry to describe a type of skate suitable for several niche inline disciplines: freestyle skating, slalom skating, wizard skating, city commuting, and urban skating. These activities take place on relatively flat ground, but the surface may not always be paved or smooth.

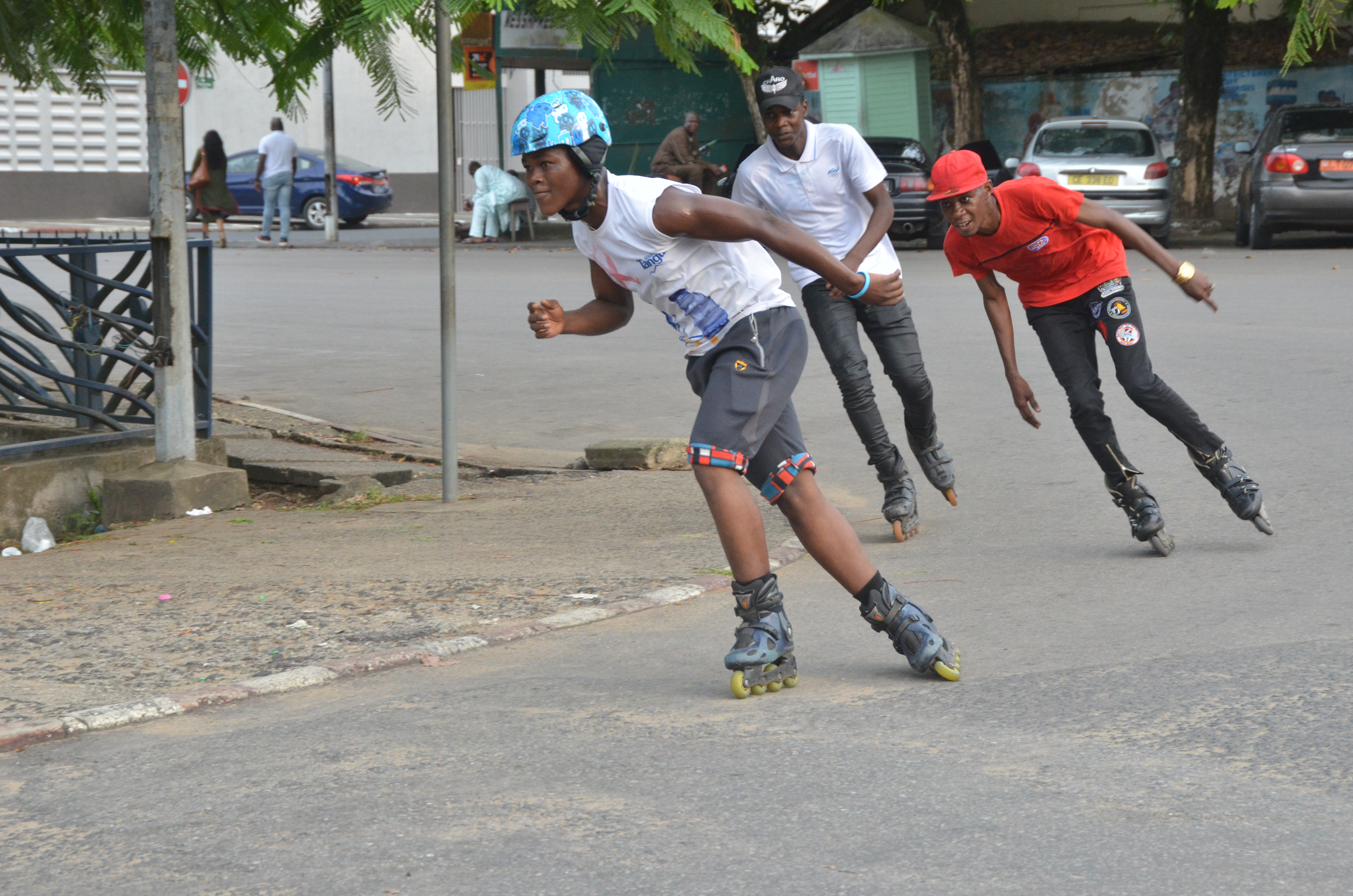
Urban skating in Bonanjo

Freestyle skating is named after its counterpart in skateboarding, just like aggressive street, park, and vert skating are named after street, park, and vert skateboarding, respectively. Freestyle skating is the art of performing skating tricks on relatively flat ground, free of obstacles. Freestyle slalom skating is a form of freestyle skating where tricks are performed around slalom cones. This is standardized by the International Freestyle Skaters Association (IFSA) and World Skate as freestyle slalom to distinguish it from speed slalom, which is a form of speed skating around cones on flat ground. Freestyle skating requires skates that support rigorous turning and edging maneuvers, with characteristics similar to hockey skates. A rockered setup with 76-80 mm wheels on a relatively short frame is common for freestyle skating.

Urban skating and city commuting take the activity to the street. But the term 'street skating' is already taken as a subdiscipline of aggressive skating, for grinding on street obstacles. Thus, this niche market is variously promoted as skating on paved roads or commuting to work on skates. These activities demand longer frames and larger wheels for higher cruising speed, stable tracking, and more comfortable rides on uneven surfaces, similar to speed skates for marathon events. Common wheel setups include 4x80mm, 4x90mm, 4x100mm, 3x100mm, 3x110mm, and 3x125mm.

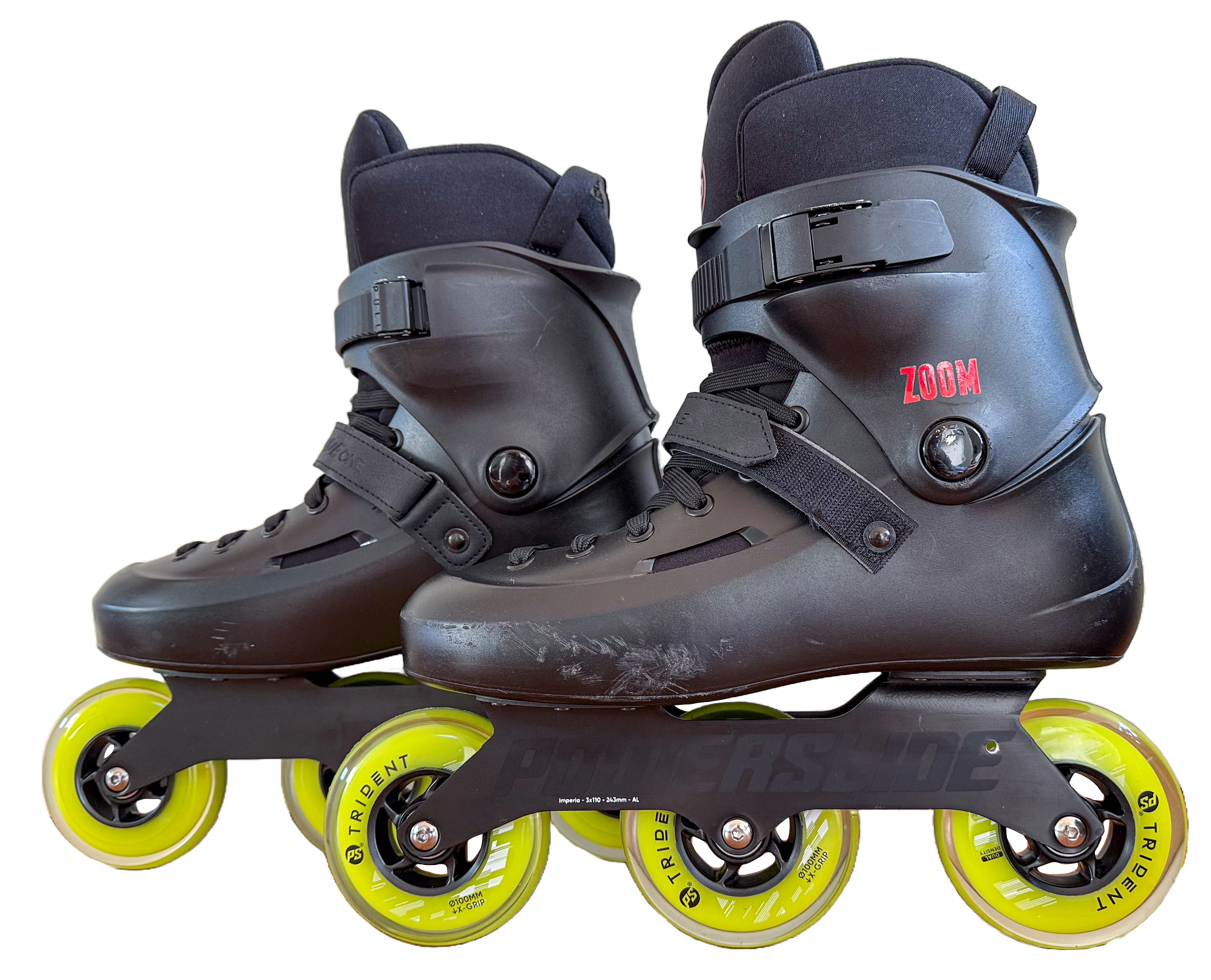
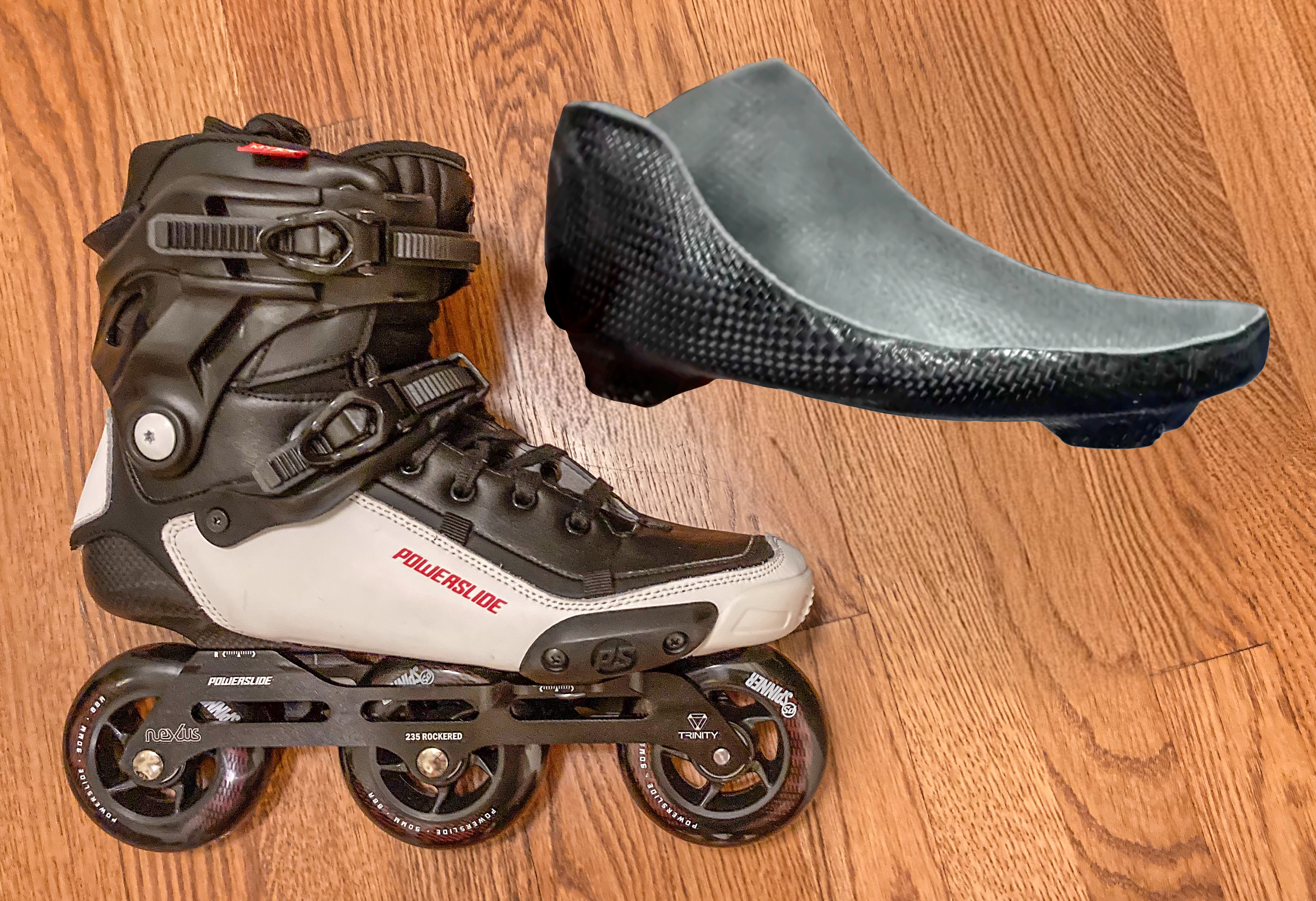
Hard boots (left) vs Hybrid boot & carbon shell (right)

In terms of skate construction, urban skates overlap with the high-end segment of recreational skates. A hard shell is standard for urban skates. Higher-end models feature hybrid boots with carbon composite shells (endoskeleton) that are heat-moldable. Despite sharing some design goals with hockey skates and speed skates, urban skates are not built like them. Unlike speed skates, urban skates provide strong ankle support with traditional hinged cuffs. Unlike hockey boots, urban boots are not built around a quarter package, nor do they have frames riveted onto them.

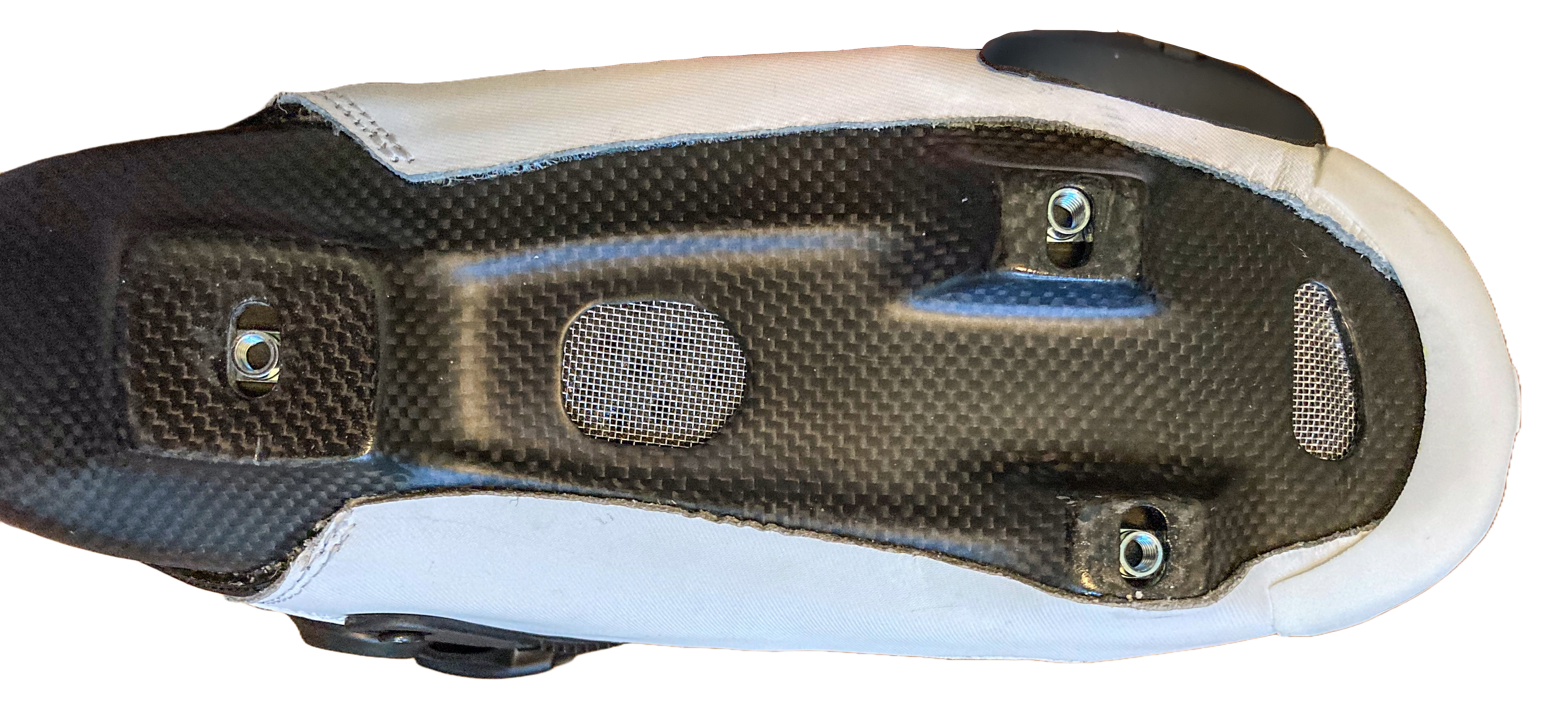

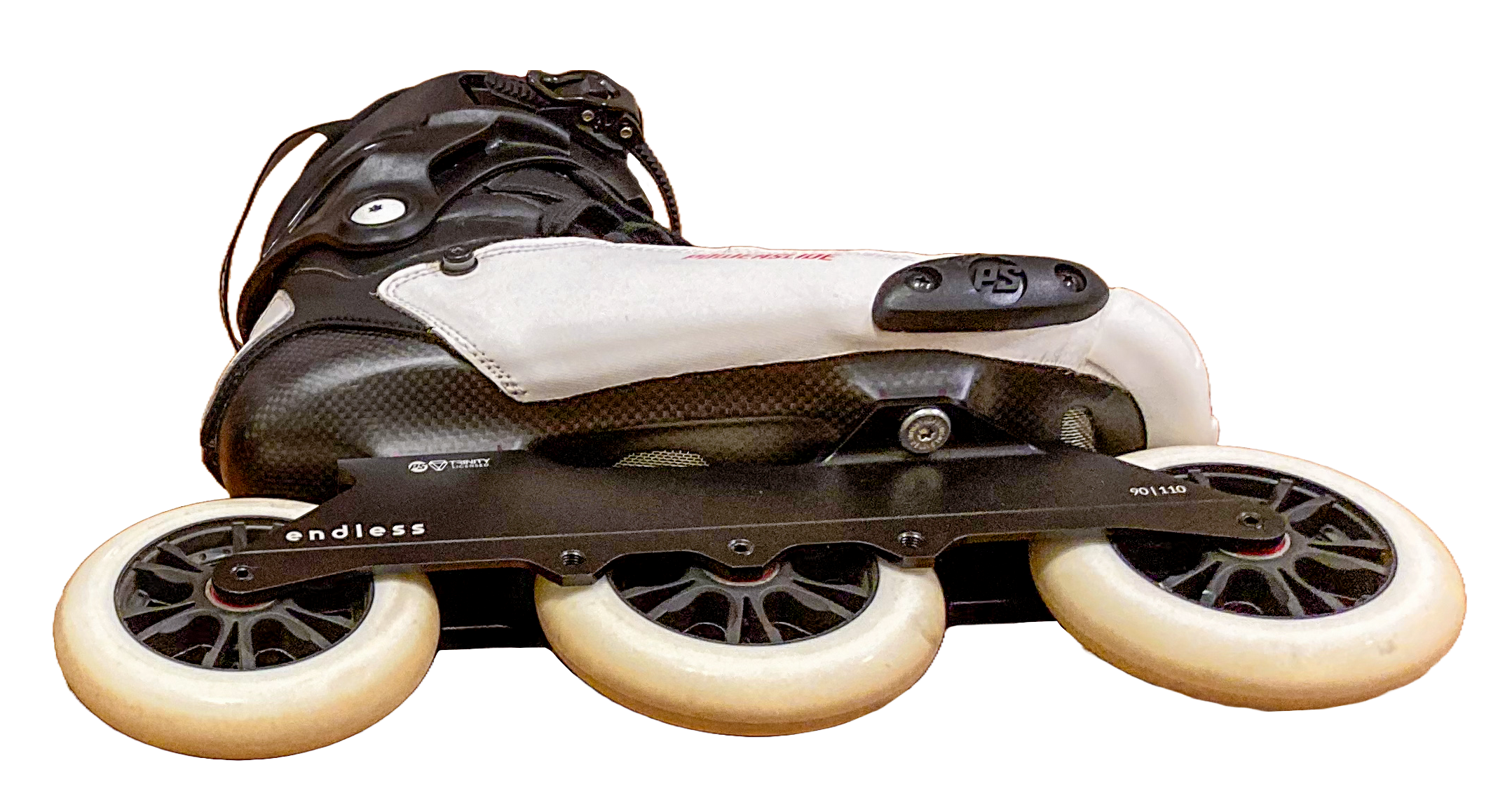
Trinity 3-pt mounting

Indeed, most urban skate boots support either the 165mm two-point or the Trinity three-point mounting standards, allowing a skater to mount a variety of compatible frames to a boot that best fits them. The same boot can thus be customized with a short frame and average-sized wheels for slalom skating, or with a long frame and large wheels for long-distance road skating.

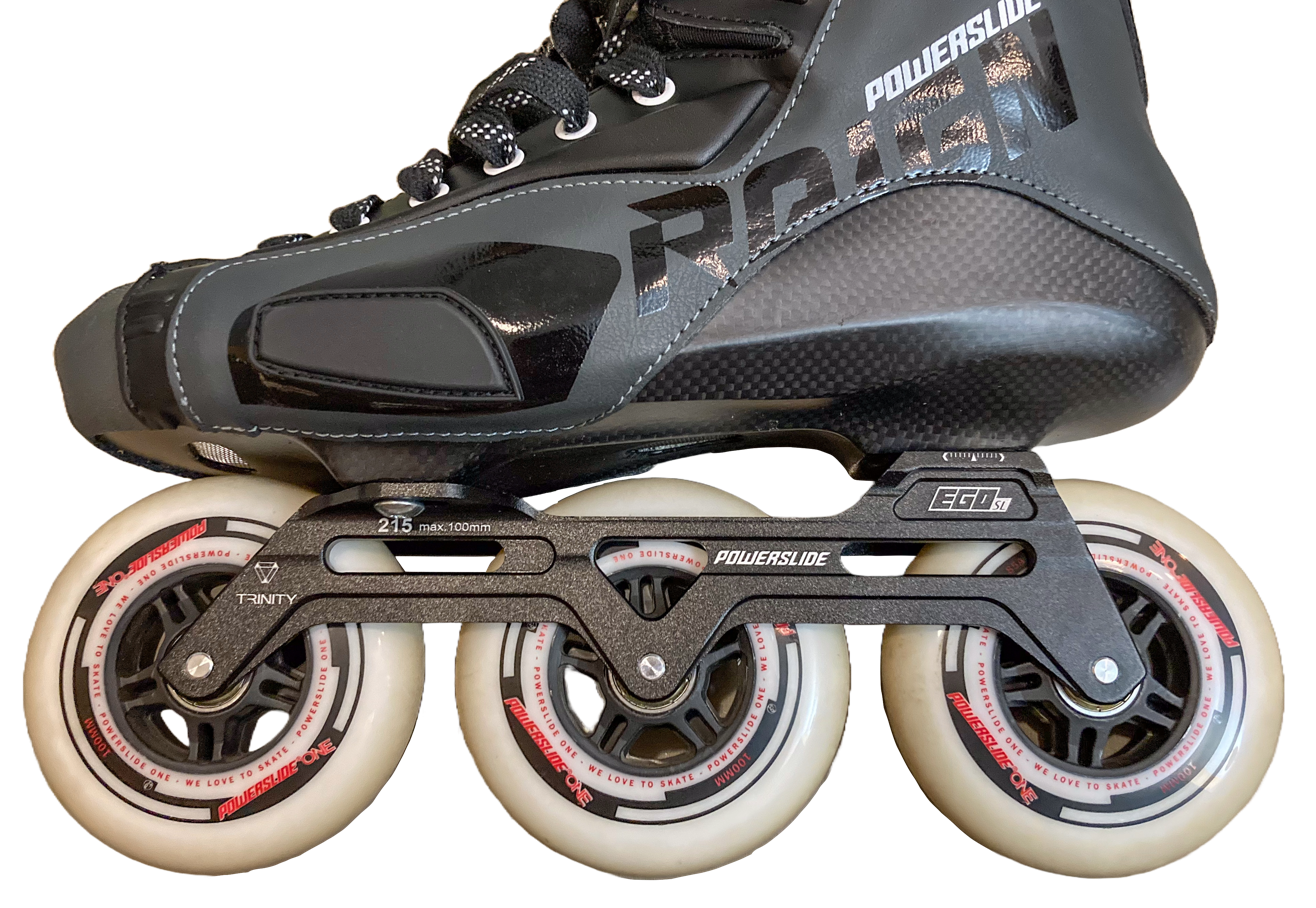
Heel-to-toe drop on a Trinity frame

Both the 165mm and Trinity standards have their heel mounting platforms raised higher than their toe mounting platforms. This difference in height between the raised heel and the lowered toe is known in the shoe industry as a heel-to-toe drop. Such a drop causes a skater to lean forward by default, simulating a slight forward flex. This is similar to the purpose of the hi-lo wheel setup in hockey skates.

Wizard skating is named after the company Wizard Skating, founded by Leon Basin in 2014. Leon and his aggressive inline friends from @Mushroomblading popularized this new form of skating. Leon himself performed flowing footwork from freestyle, slalom, and figure skating while blazing through roads, rolling over curbs, skating up ramps, bashing down stairs, and parkouring on walls. Leon perfected a type of "Wizard" skate for this sport, featuring a long frame, large wheels, and a rockered wheel setup. For a skate size of EU43, these Wizard skates are available with either a 4x100mm or a 5x80mm setup. Skaters are increasingly referring to this style as flow skating.

Wizard frames utilize the UFS mounting system from aggressive skates. Wizard frames are thus not compatible with other urban boots where 165mm and Trinity mounting systems dominate. Unlike the flat aggressive frames from which UFS originated, a Wizard frame does include a built-in heel-to-toe drop, similar to 165mm and Trinity systems.

== One-piece carbon boot ==
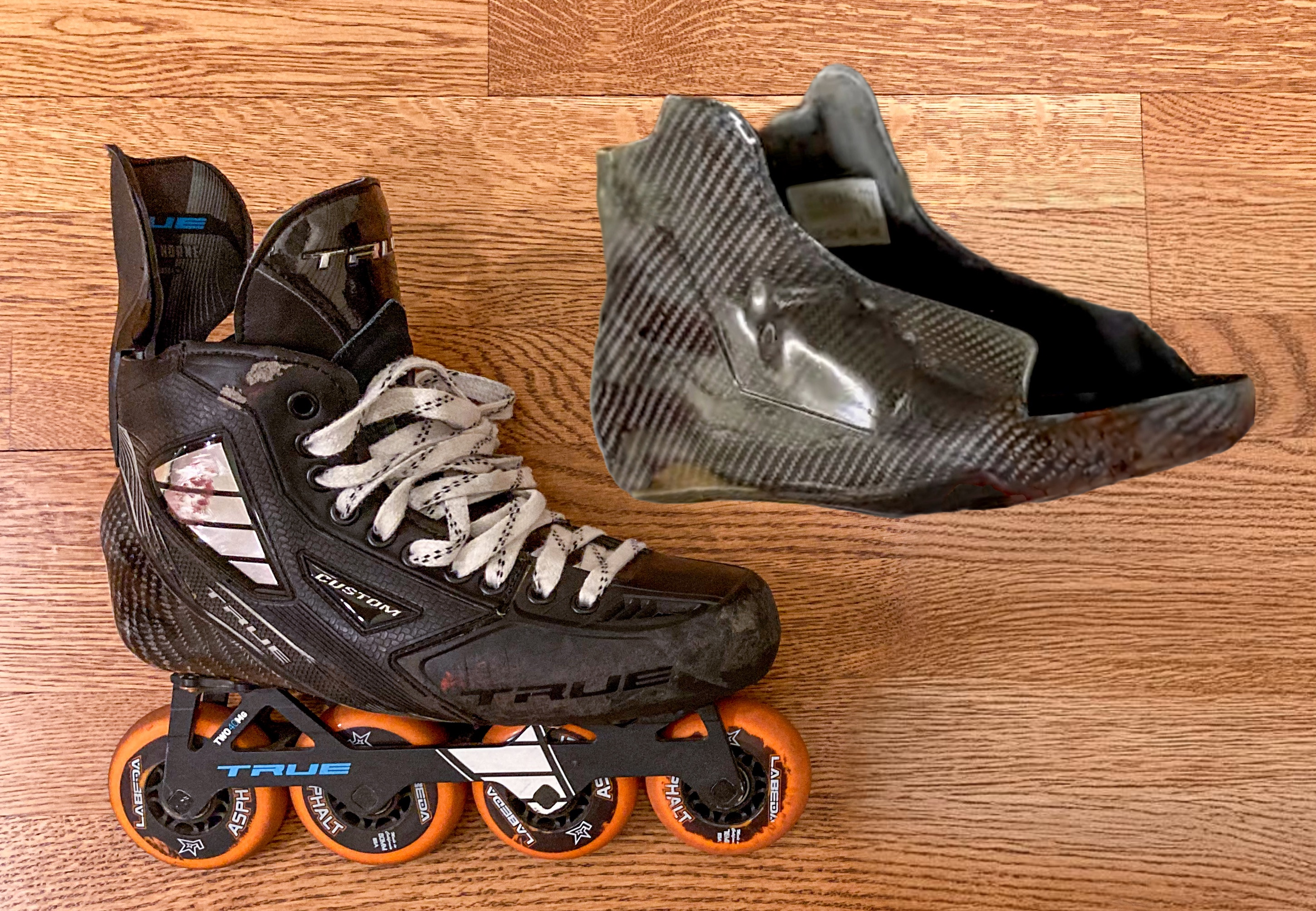
One-piece monocoque shell

One-piece carbon boots were developed for speed skating in the 1990s. These are boots built around a carbon fiber-reinforced composite shell, where the shell almost completely surrounds a foot. After eyelet holes are punched out of a shell, the shell is usable as a functional boot if laced.

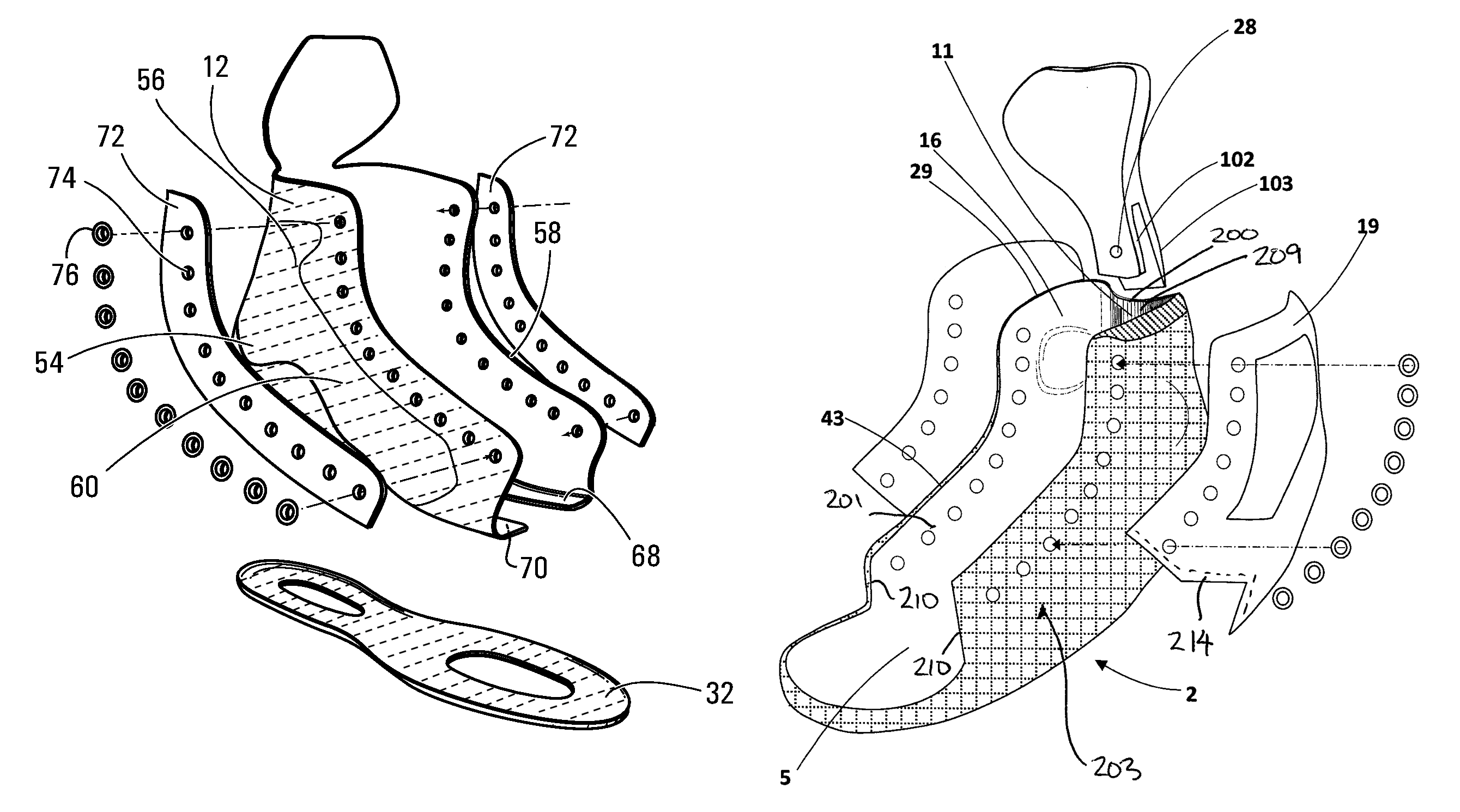
Two-piece shell (left) vs. one-piece shell (right), indicated by shaded areas

In the 21st century, hockey skate makers began to experiment with composite shells inspired by these advances in speed skates. For instance, in 2004, Easton Sports filed for a patent on a "unitary shell" made from fiber-reinforced resin, with sections of integrated walls arising from the sole. Easton's Synergy 1300C came out in 2005, with a unitary shell made with carbon and aramid fibers. This is widely recognized as the first retail hockey skate with a composite shell. A rigid shell exacerbates inherent conflicts arising from key design goals for a hockey skate: being lightweight, economical, a firm support structure comprising an outsole and a quarter package, and lastly, fitting this support to the different foot shapes of individual players. The fitting issue can be mitigated by adding a layer of heat-moldable materials to the quarter package, such that a player can finish the final molding process of a boot at a skate shop or at home. Heat molding became possible in 2006, with the Easton Synergy 1500C.

Other hockey makers take it one step further, creating a single, unbroken composite shell that also incorporates the "facing" portion where eyelets are located. These one-piece monocoque shells are almost usable by themselves as functional skate boots, if laced and mounted with inline frames. With the advent of "one-piece" shells, the traditional hockey boot construction is now known as employing a two-piece shell, comprising a quarter package attached to an outsole. A heat-moldable monocoque shell requires no breaking-in, unlike traditional hockey skates. All tuning needs are done by baking skates in an oven before wearing them, as often as needed.

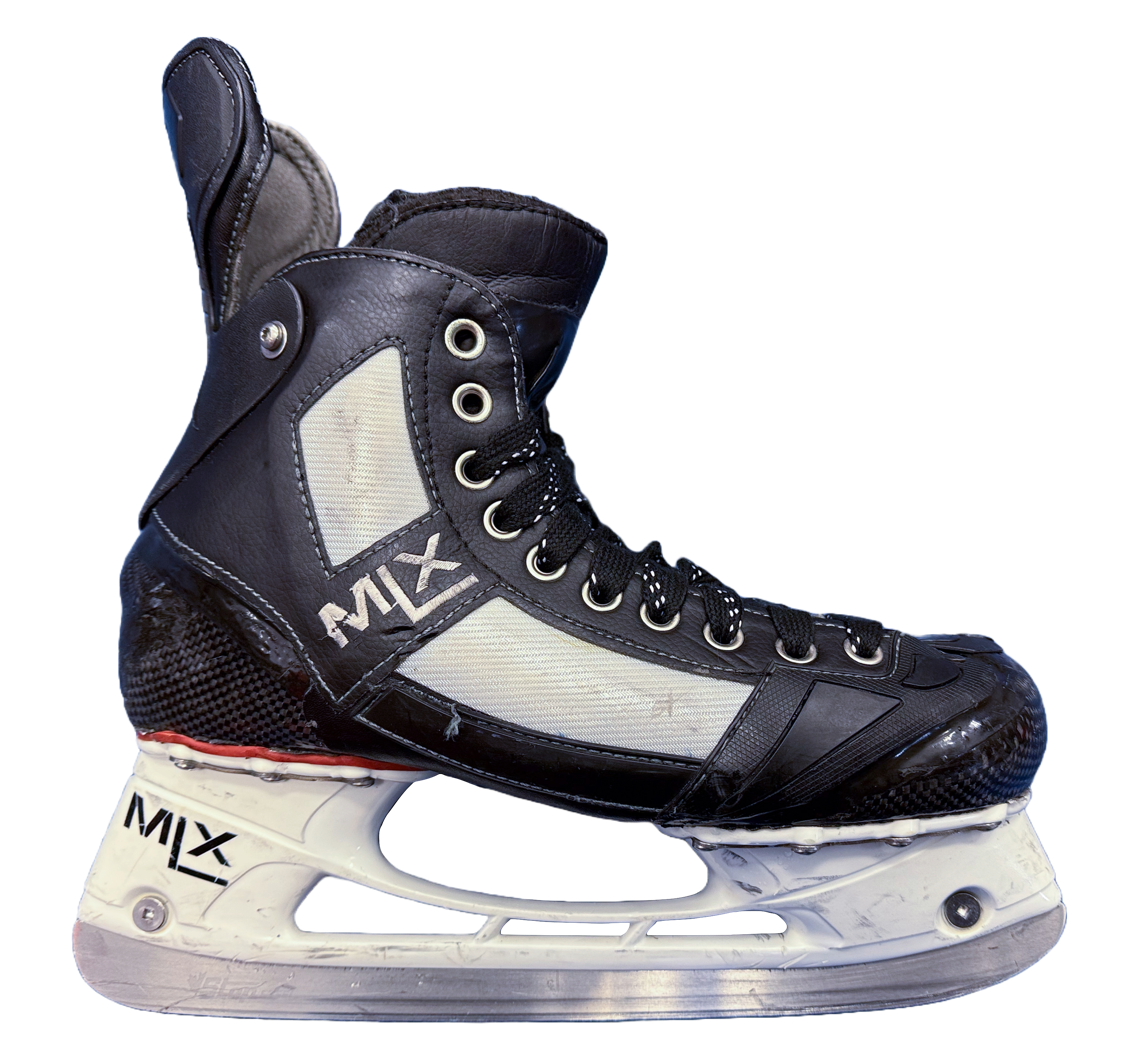
MLX hockey skate

The use of monocoque shell in hockey skates traces back to Scott Van Horne who started to make and sell custom composite speed skates in the 1990s. He incorporated VH Footwear in 1999, and made custom speed skates in the 2010s. Van Horne worked with Dave Cruikshank to file hockey skate patents in 2009 and 2011, on a composite shell and removable tongue / tendon guard. This shell foreshadowed that used in inline skates with a hybrid soft boot in the 2020s, and became the basis for the retail MLX Skate released in 2010 by Cruikshank's new company. Easton Sports bought MLX in 2011, and worked with Cruikshank to release a new Easton Mako skate in 2013, based on the MLX Skate. Easton was later acquired by Chartwell Investments which subsequently sold it to Bauer.

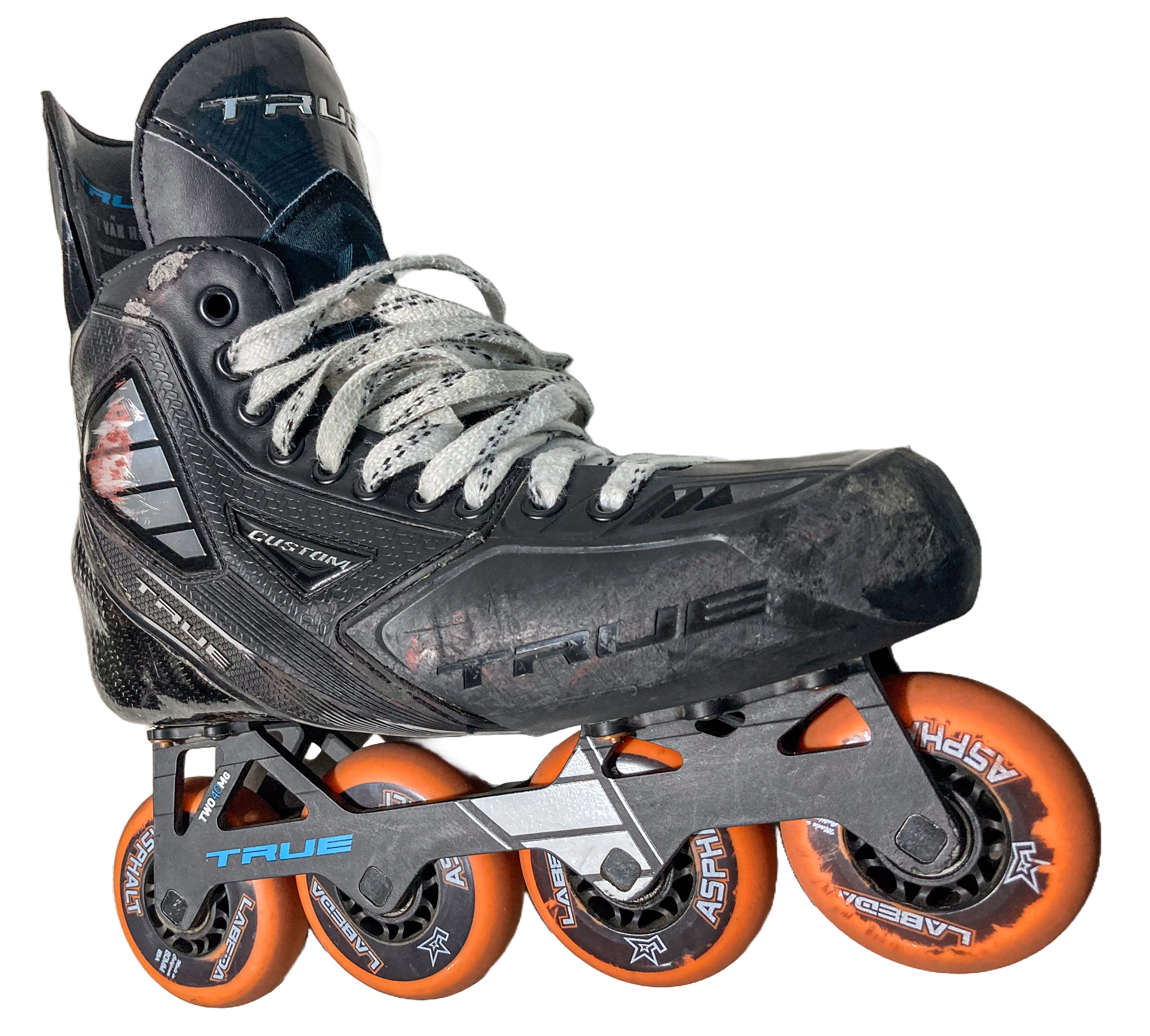
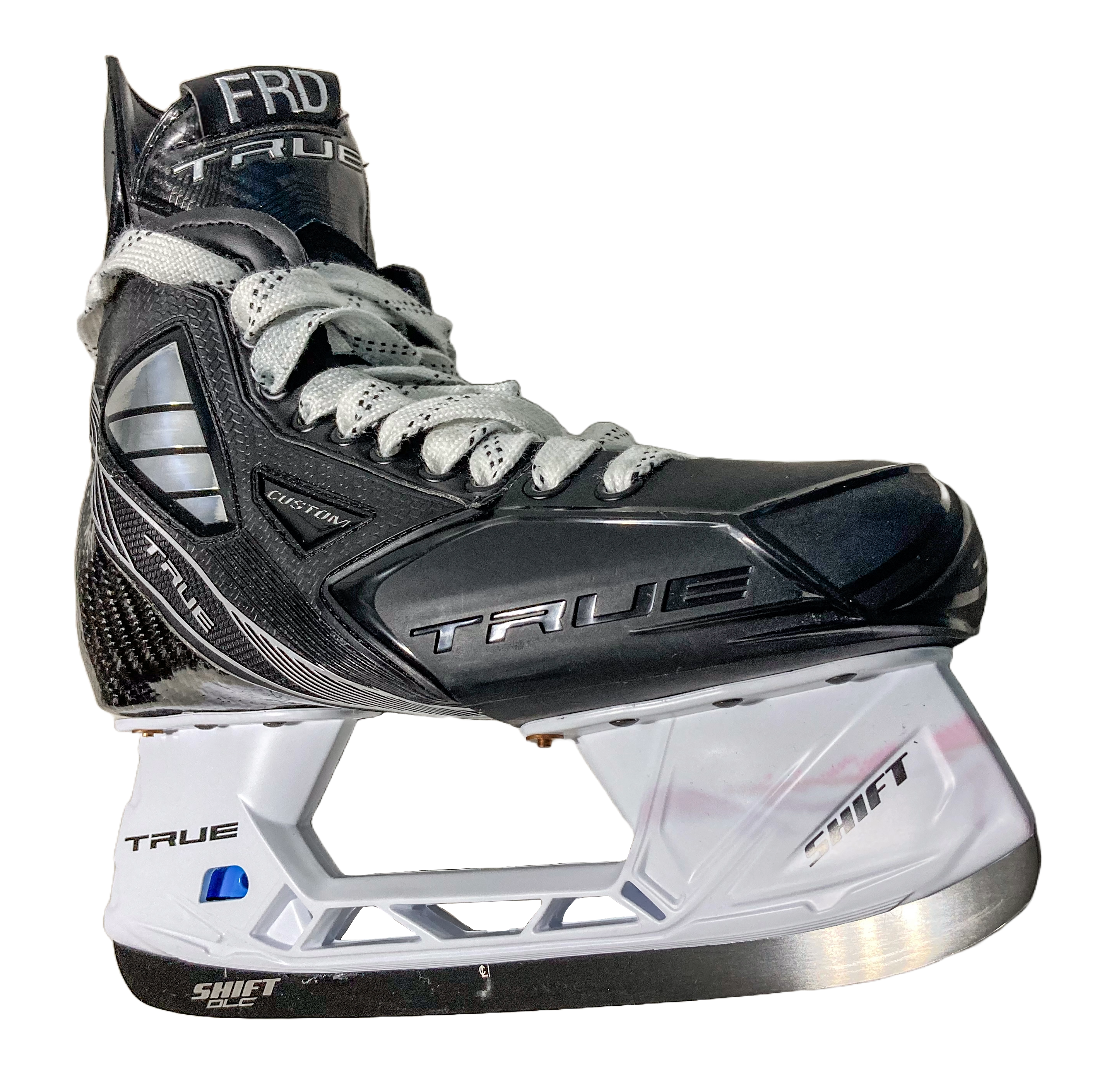
TF Pro inline skate (left) vs. ice skate (right)

By then, Van Horne had gone back to perfecting custom speed skate boots. In 2012, he created tooling and a process to 3D-scan a skater's foot, and to 3D-print a custom last based on which a speed skate boot is shaped. By 2015, VH Footwear had adopted the same tooling and process for hockey skates, filed a patent application, and marketed them under the brand VH Hockey. True Temper Sports bought VH Hockey in 2016, and started to mass-produce retail hockey skates with heat-moldable monococque shells, as well as scaling up 3D scanning of feet at retail stores for custom True hockey skates, leading to inline hockey skates such as the TF9 Roller Skate, and the TF Pro Custom Roller Skate in 2020.
