= Bataysk railway station =

Railway station in Bataysk, Russia

Bataysk Батайск
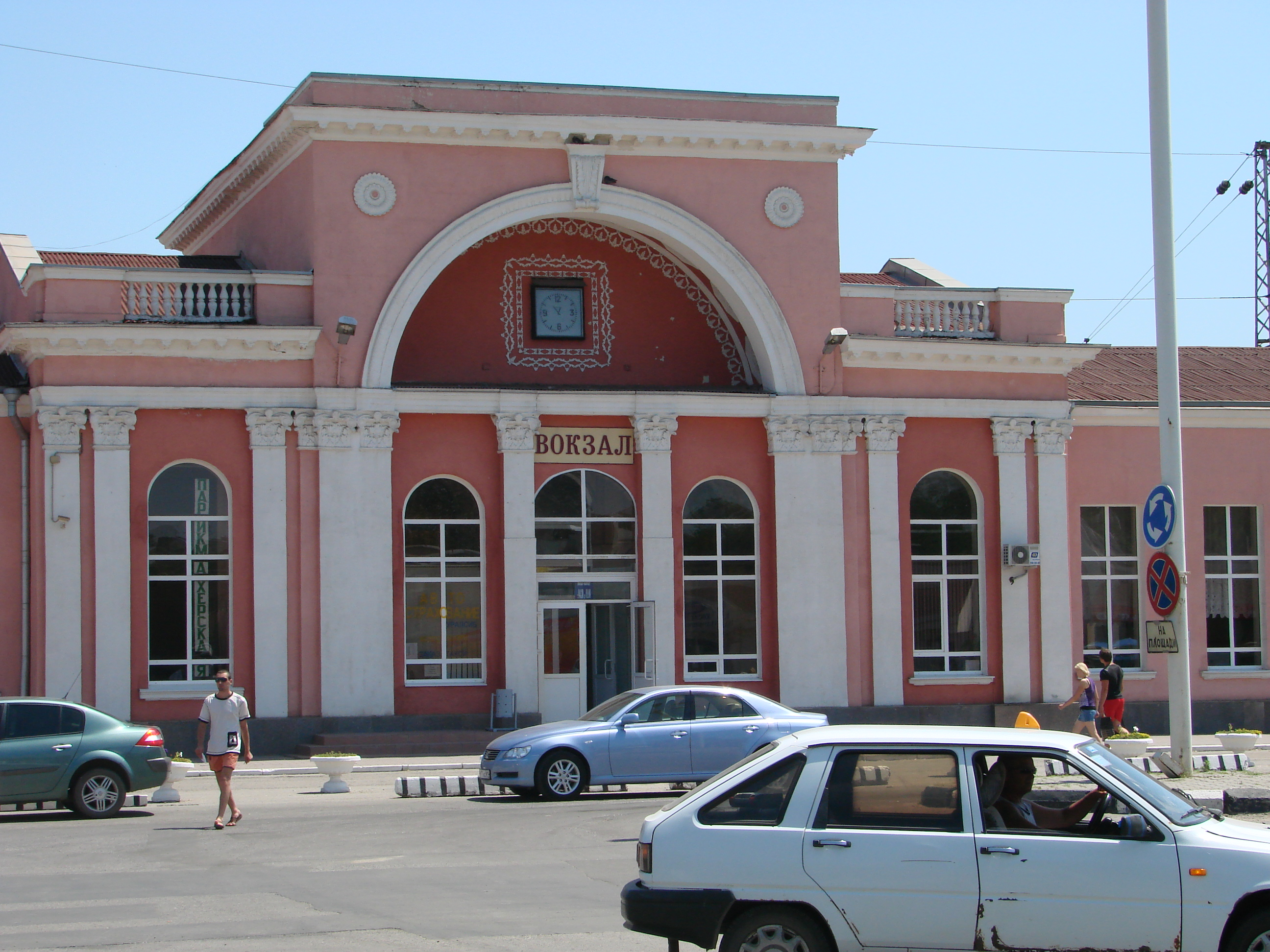
- View of the station from Kirova street

General information
- Location: 1, Kirova Street, Bataysk, Russia
- Coordinates: 47.138267°N 39.755497°E
- Platforms: 4
- Tracks: 25

Construction
- Parking: yes

Other information
- Station code: 510007

History
- Opened: 1875
- Rebuilt: 1930
Location

Bataysk railway station (Russian: станция Батайск) is a major mainline railway station located in self-named city, Rostov oblast, Russia. It is a junction of North Caucasus Railway, 10 km from Rostov-Glavny. The station combines four routes out of Bataysk. It is an important junction, where the Rostov-on-Don — Tikhoretsk (Tikhoretsk station) main line, and the railway lines to Azov, Salsk and Starominskaya diverge. It is approximately 300 m from the town center.

== History ==
Bataysk railway station opened in 1875 with construction of the Rostov-on-Don — Vladikavkaz Railway and locomotive depot. The opening ceremony took place on 14 July 1875. Bataysk was the second class station since 1900. Bataysk was soon served by other lines. The Bataysk — Azov Railway opened in 1911 and the Bataysk — Torgovaya (now Salsk) opened in 1915.

The station suffered considerable destruction during the Russian Civil War. In early 1923 it was reinstated. Reconstruction of rail terminus was completed in 1930. The station staff was awarded the red banner of the State Defense Committee for heroic work during the Great Patriotic War. Station master Konstatntin Mazurov received the title of the Hero of Socialist Labour. Three hundred war veterans, who worked on the station were awarded the medals "For Valiant Labour in the Great Patriotic War 1941–1945."

Bataysk station was electrified 25 kV AC system in 1963.

== Description ==
Bataysk has 4 low-lying through platforms, 25 main tracks along the station building, 56 hump tracks, walking bridge, railroad car shed, and locomotive depot which exploit electric locomotives VL80, VL60, shunting diesel locomotives ChME3, TEM7A and motor coach ACh2.

The station building is a modest building of one main floor with central and lateral projections and a massive portal over the front entrance. The high windows of the projections have semicircular upper parts. The others windows are rectangular. The facade is decorated with Corinthian pilasters. A cornice above small corbels crowns the top of the station building.

The station was renovated in 2014. The station building partly lost the exterior decor in the process.

== Services ==
The station is operated by Russian Railways. Bataysk is the terminal for long-distance and suburban trains operated by the Federal Passenger Company and North Caucasian Suburban Passenger Company. The most common destinations are: Rostov-on-Don, Adler, Novorossiysk, Krasnodar, Kislovodsk, Baku. The average stopping times of passenger trains are of about 2 minutes. The station host suburban trains from Rostov-on-Don, Kushchyovskaya, Azov, Starominskaya, Tikhoretskaya, Salsk, Volgodonsk and Kuberle.

== Gallery ==
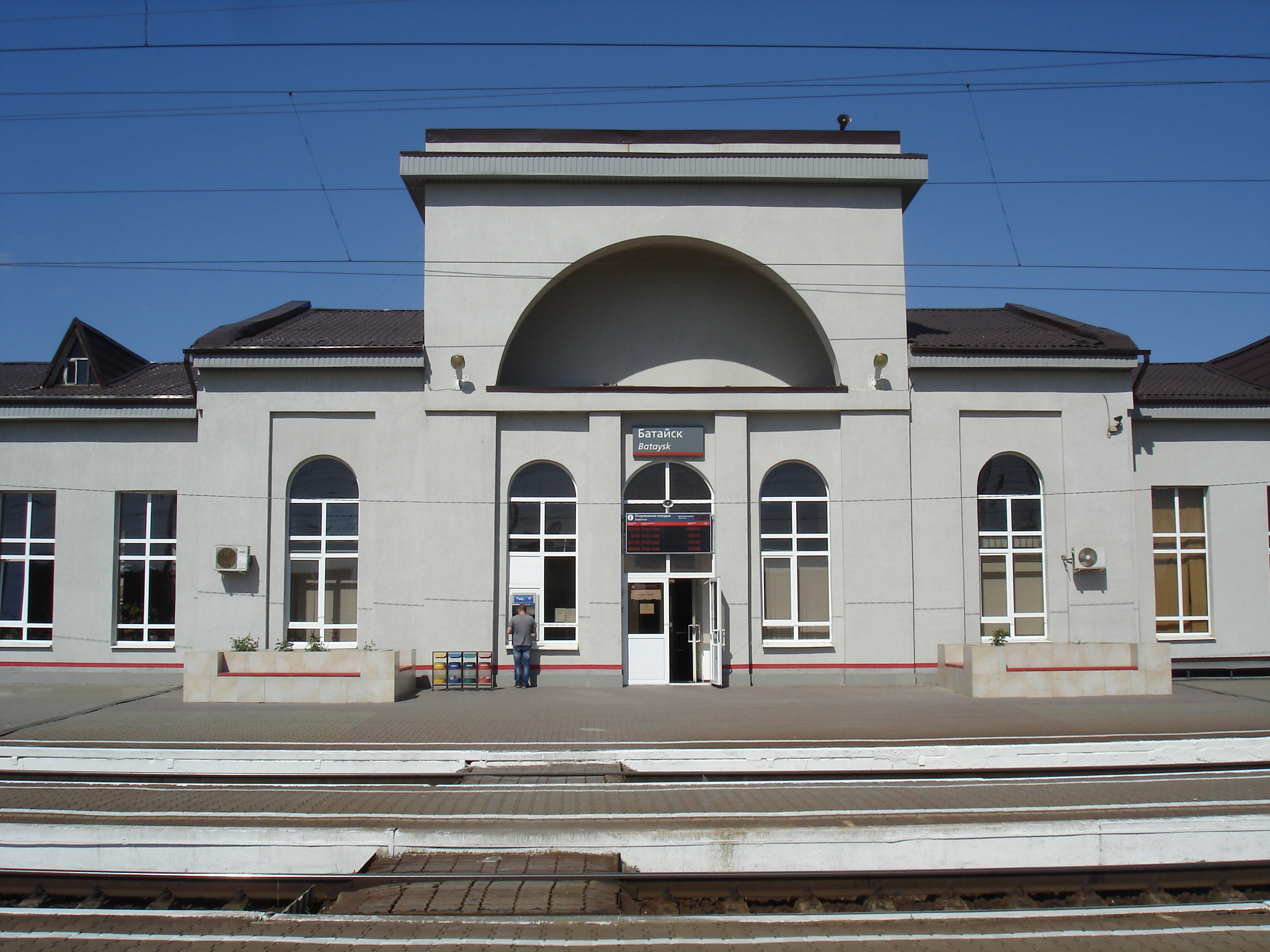
View of the station from platforms

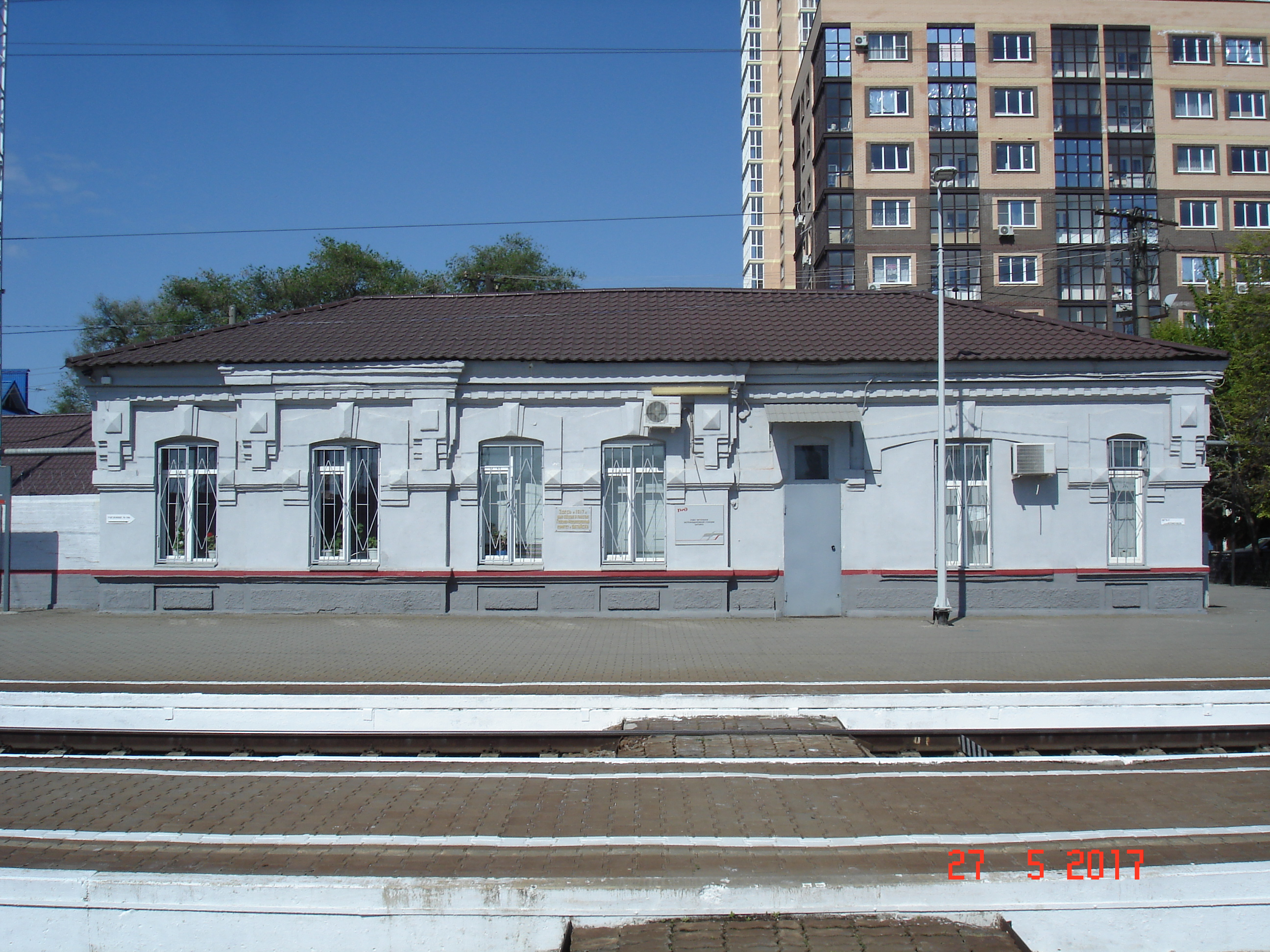
Office building

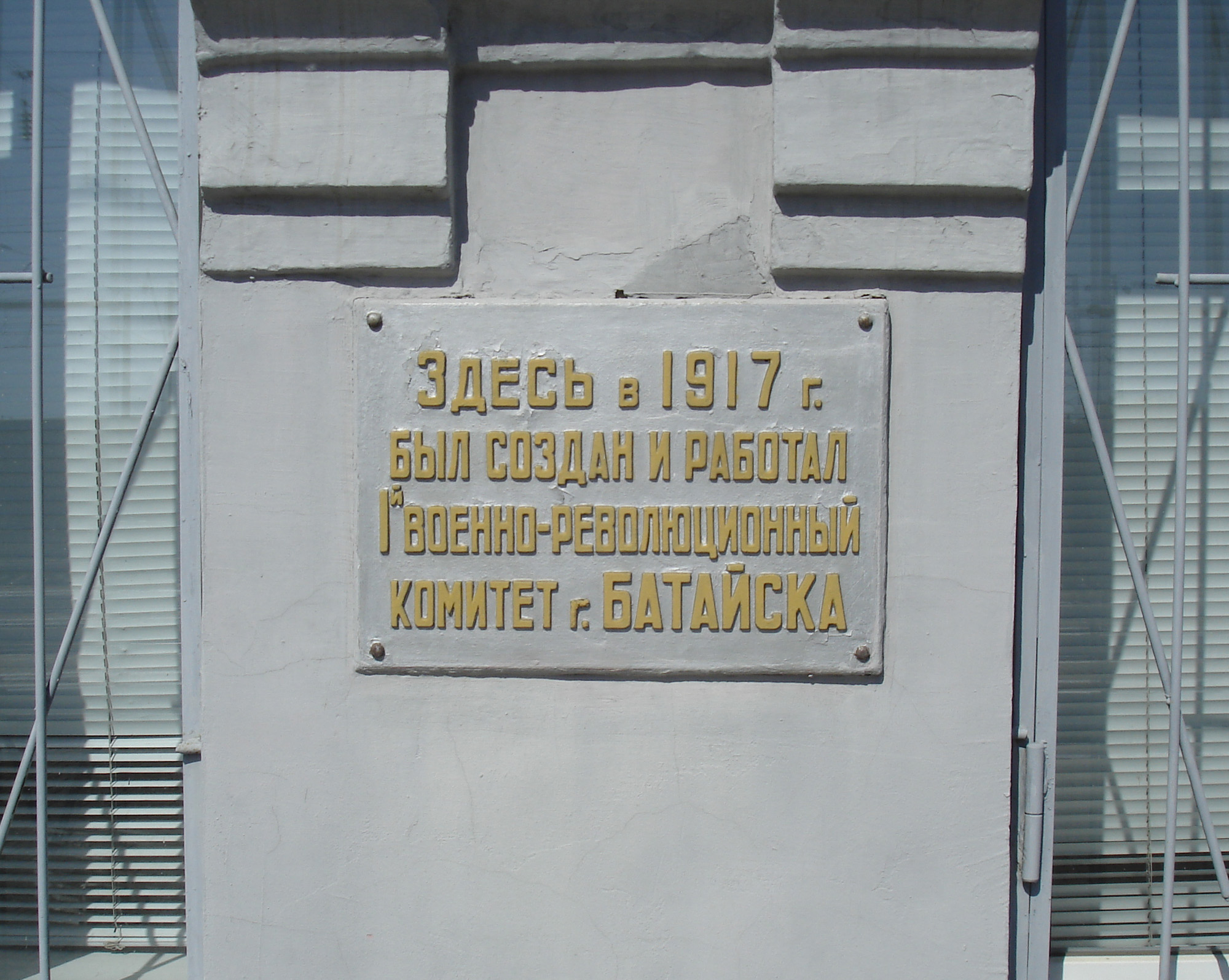
Commemorative plaque
