= Taganrog Passazhirsky railway station =

Railway station in Taganrog, Rostov, Russia

Taganrog–Passazhirsky Таганрог–Пассажирский
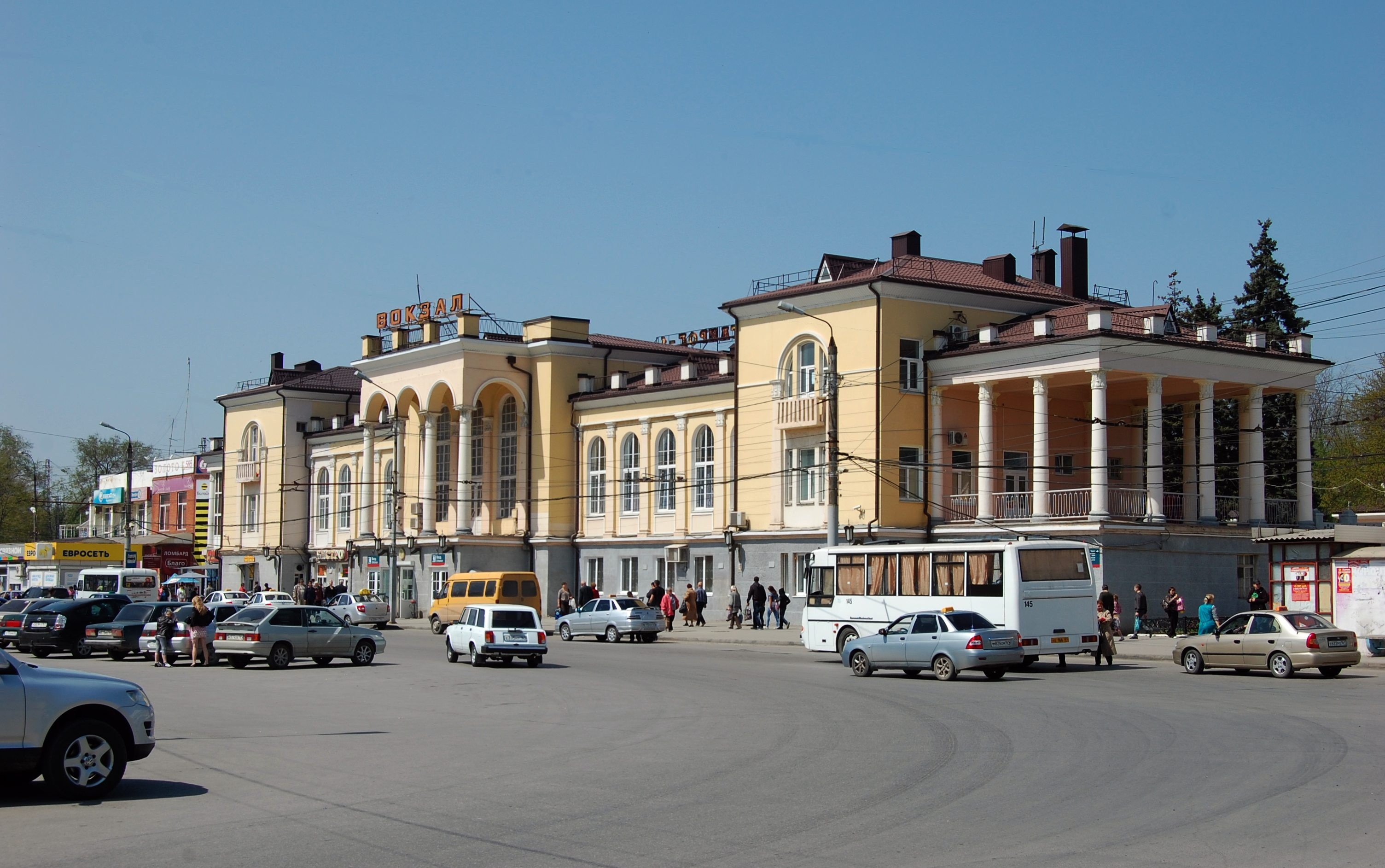
- View of the station from Privokzalnaya Square

General information
- Location: 8, Moskatova st., Taganrog, Russia
- Coordinates: 47.262496°N 38.917964°E
- Platforms: 2
- Tracks: 4

Construction
- Platform levels: 2
- Parking: yes

Other information
- Station code: 511419

History
- Opened: 1934
- Rebuilt: 1970
- Former names: Taganrog I
Location

Taganrog–Passazhirsky (Russian: Таганрог–Пассажирский, literally Taganrog–Passenger) is a railway station in Taganrog, Rostov oblast, Russia. It is a terminus for the Rostov-on-Don — Taganrog and Taganrog — Ilovaisk railways.

== History ==
Station Taganrog Passazhirsky was opened in 1970. Station was built on Moskatova Street in the northern part of Taganrog. It was the second railway station in the city (after Taganrog II). Dead-end station Taganrog II was under pressure, for this reason it was decided to build a new terminus in Taganrog. Passenger and freight trains proceeded in state through the station from Rostov-on-Don to Donbas and Crimea (Donetsk, Horlivka, Lugansk, Sevastopol), as well as Central Ukraine and Moldova. Taganrog Passazhirsky handled several pairs of passenger long-distance trains (Moscow — Adler, Moscow — Kislovodsk, Rostov-on-Don — Simferopol, Yekaterinburg — Simferopol, Rostov-on-Don — Chișinău, Minsk — Adler, Kyiv — Adler and others) per day.

The asymmetric station building is a clear example of South Russian architecture. It has central and side arched portico. The facade is decorated with pilasters. The high windows of the waiting room have semicircular upper parts. The central colonnade is similar to architectural decision at the railway stations in Simferopol and Sochi.

In connection with deepening of Ukrainian political crisis intensity of railway communication with Ukraine declined sharply. Routes other trains were changed. In such a way Taganrog Passazhirsky station hosts only suburban trains from Rostov-on-Don and village of Avilo-Uspenka (on the border with Ukraine).
