= Taganrog II railway station =

Railway station in Taganrog, Russia

Taganrog II Таганрог-II
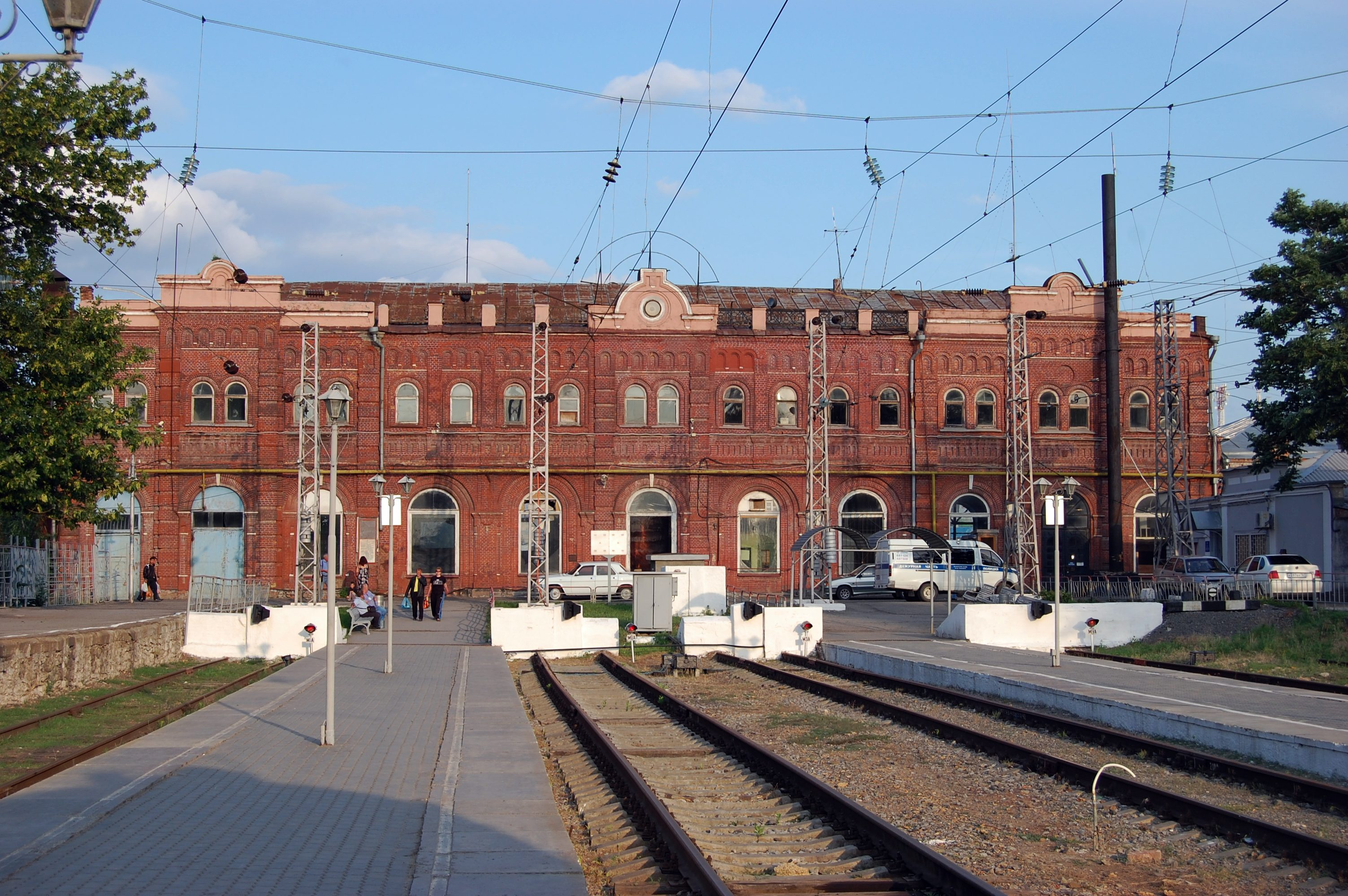
- View of the station from platforms

General information
- Location: 1, Vosstaniya Square, Taganrog, Russia
- Coordinates: 47.221223°N 38.914559°E
- Platforms: 3
- Tracks: 4

Construction
- Platform levels: 2
- Parking: yes

Other information
- Station code: 511508

History
- Opened: 1869
- Former names: Taganrog
Location

Taganrog II (Russian: Таганрог-II) is a railway station in Taganrog, Rostov oblast, Russia. It is a terminal station for the Rostov-on-Don — Taganrog railway. The station host only suburban trains from Rostov-on-Don. International polytechnic museum is located on the second floor. Among the showpieces of museum there are English projection camera 19th century, soviet television set КVN-49, radiogram Mir and others.

== History ==
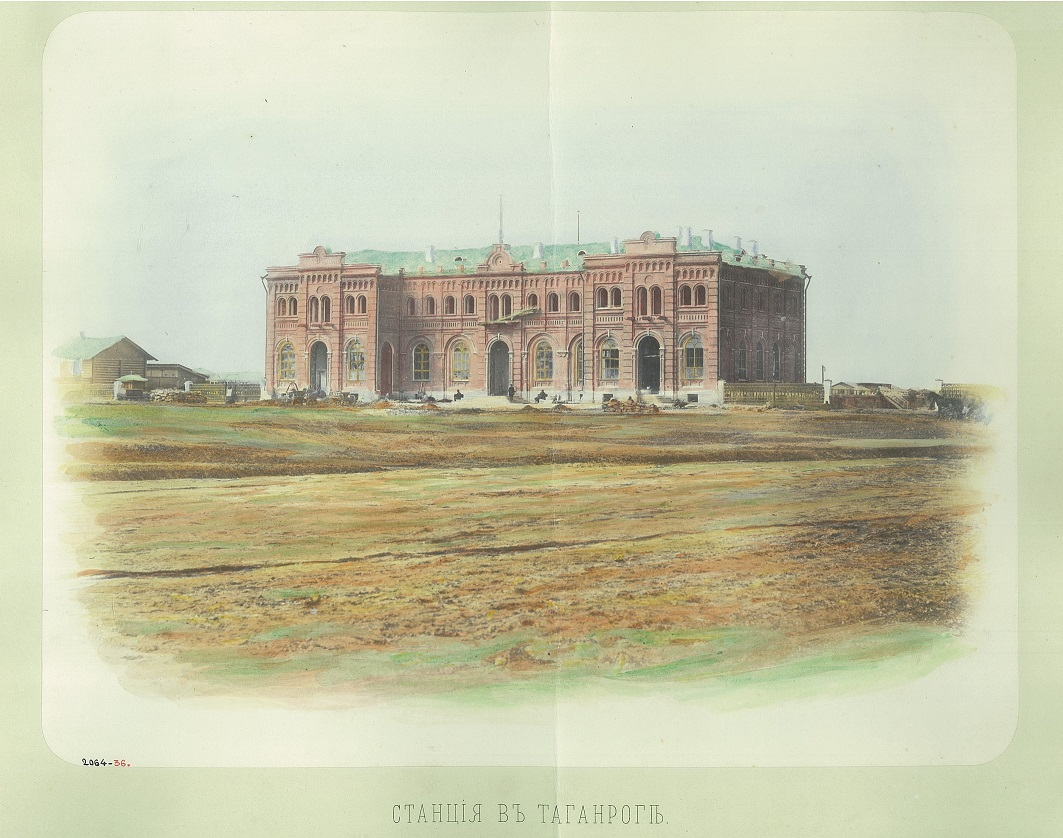
Taganrog railway station in 1865

Two-story station building was built with red brick in 1869 to a design by Sergei Zagoskin. Plaster was not applied. The facade is decorated with ornamental setting. The station building is a classic example of red-brick eclecticism, which was popular in Taganrog and Rostov-on-Don. The construction of the station was funded and managed by a famous businessman Jacob Polyakov. The works with his involvement started on 23 June 1869 and lasted until December 1869.

The building is considered almost pristine to this day. Only a one-story separate annex was lost. Uneven windows, arched oriels, attics are certainly a colorful station feature. Station layout was small, but passengers on platforms were protected by a special appentice from the sun and rain. Station chapel was built to the left of the terminus in 1904. In the 1920s it was destroyed. Station Taganrog II had a locomotive depot for 12 steam locomotives with outdoor turntable.

The opening ceremony of the railway station took place on 4 January 1870. Almost 100 years it was the only railway station in Taganrog. After building the second station Taganrog Passazhirsky (former Taganrog I) the station was renamed in Taganrog II.

Dilapidated station building was transferred to the ownership of North Caucasus Railway of Ministry of Railways. Precarious state of station has enabled to make a film Old gun (Russian: Старое ружьё) about Nazi occupation of Taganrog. After the shoot the terminus was restored.

== Gallery ==
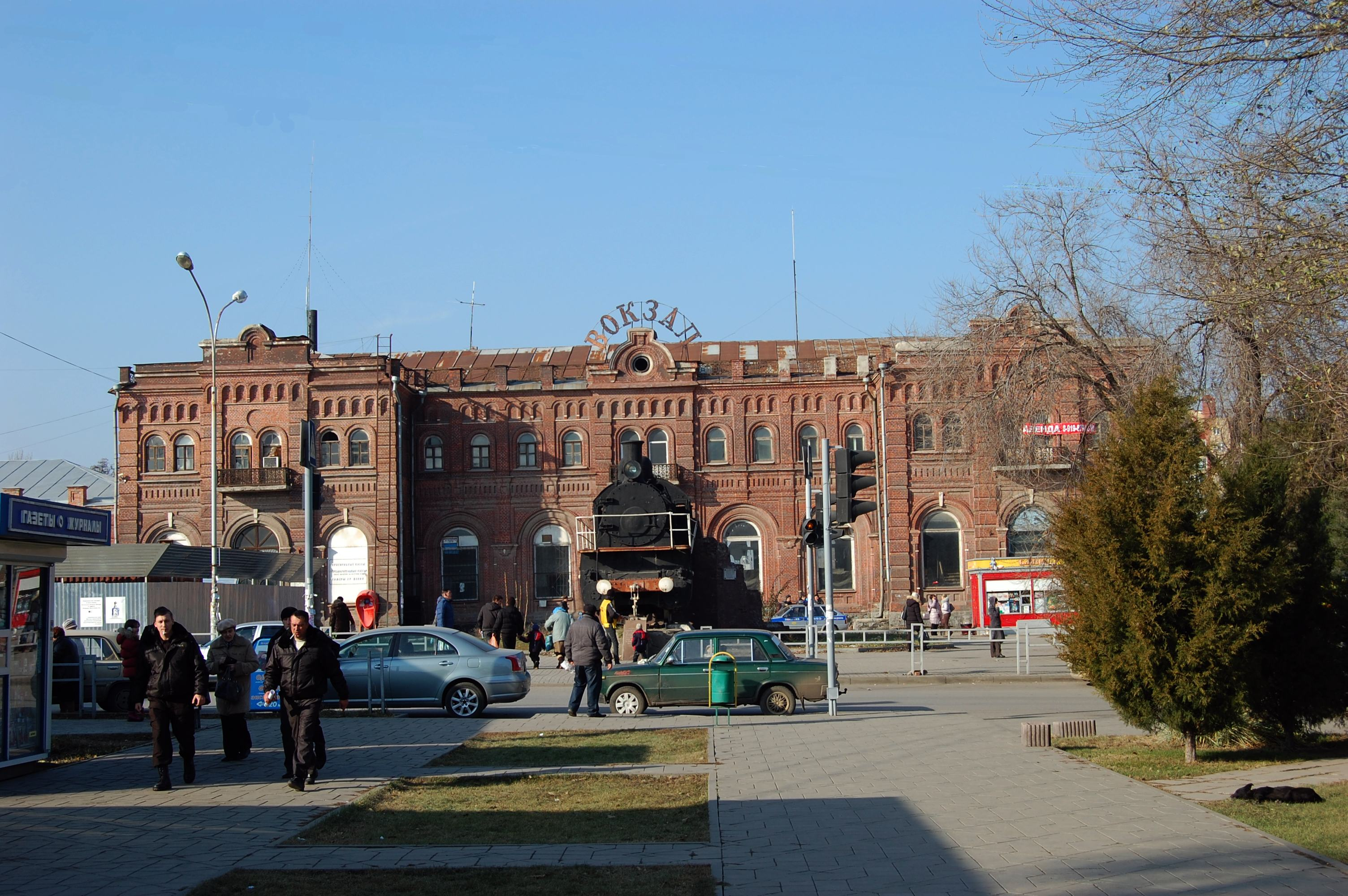
View of the station from Vosstaniya Square

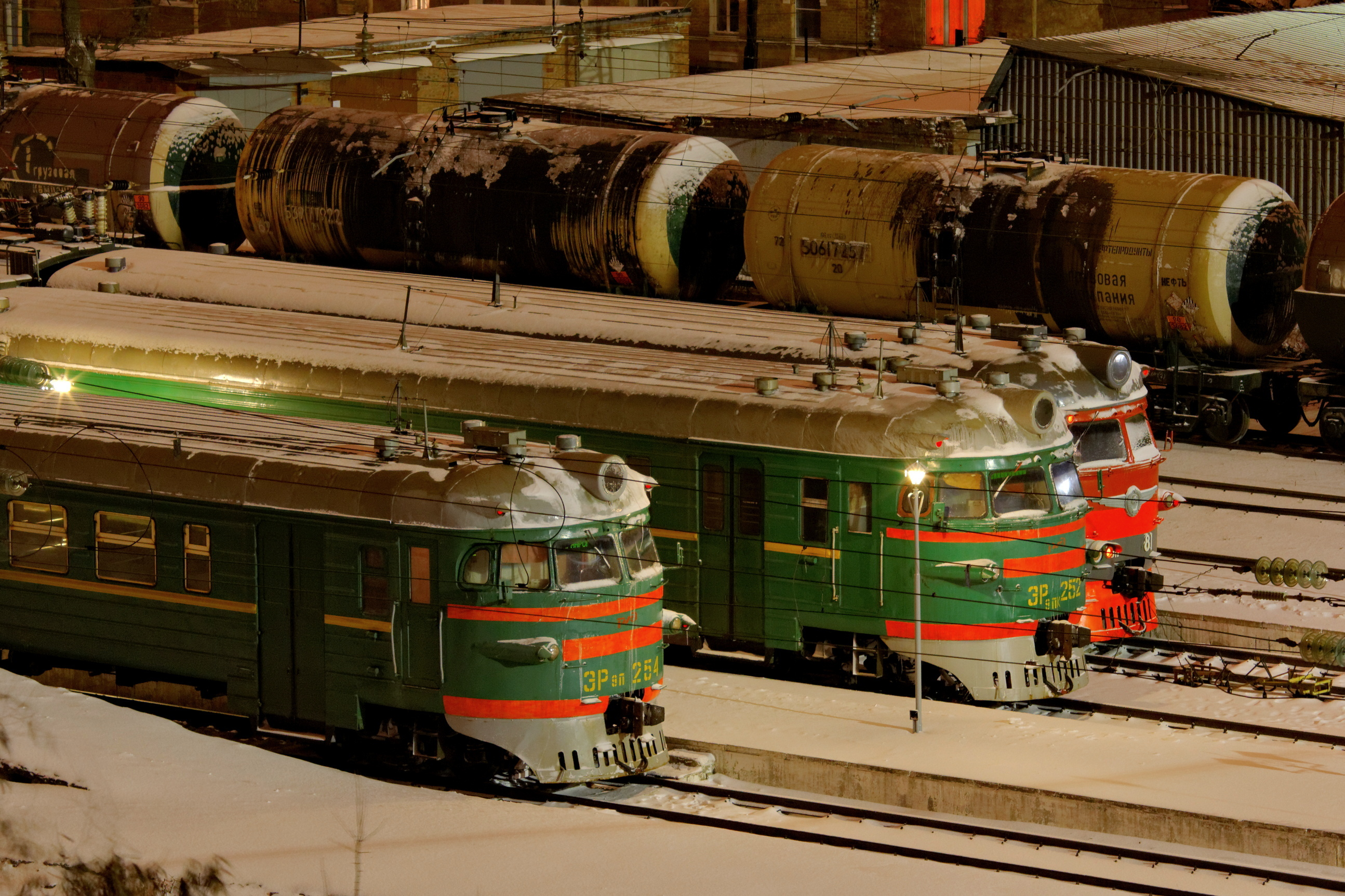
Suburban electric trains ER9P

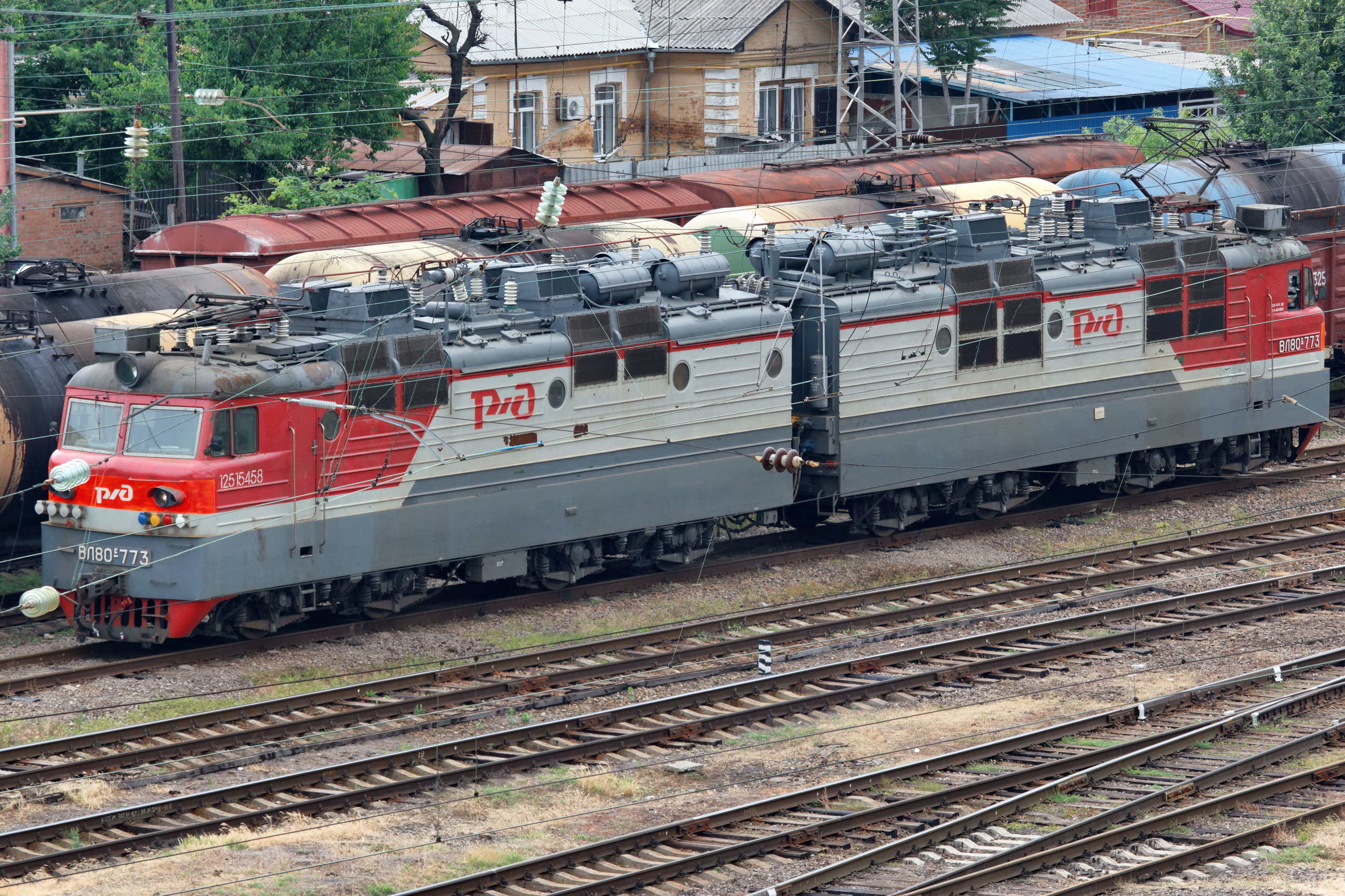
Electric locomotive VL80S-773 in Taganrog

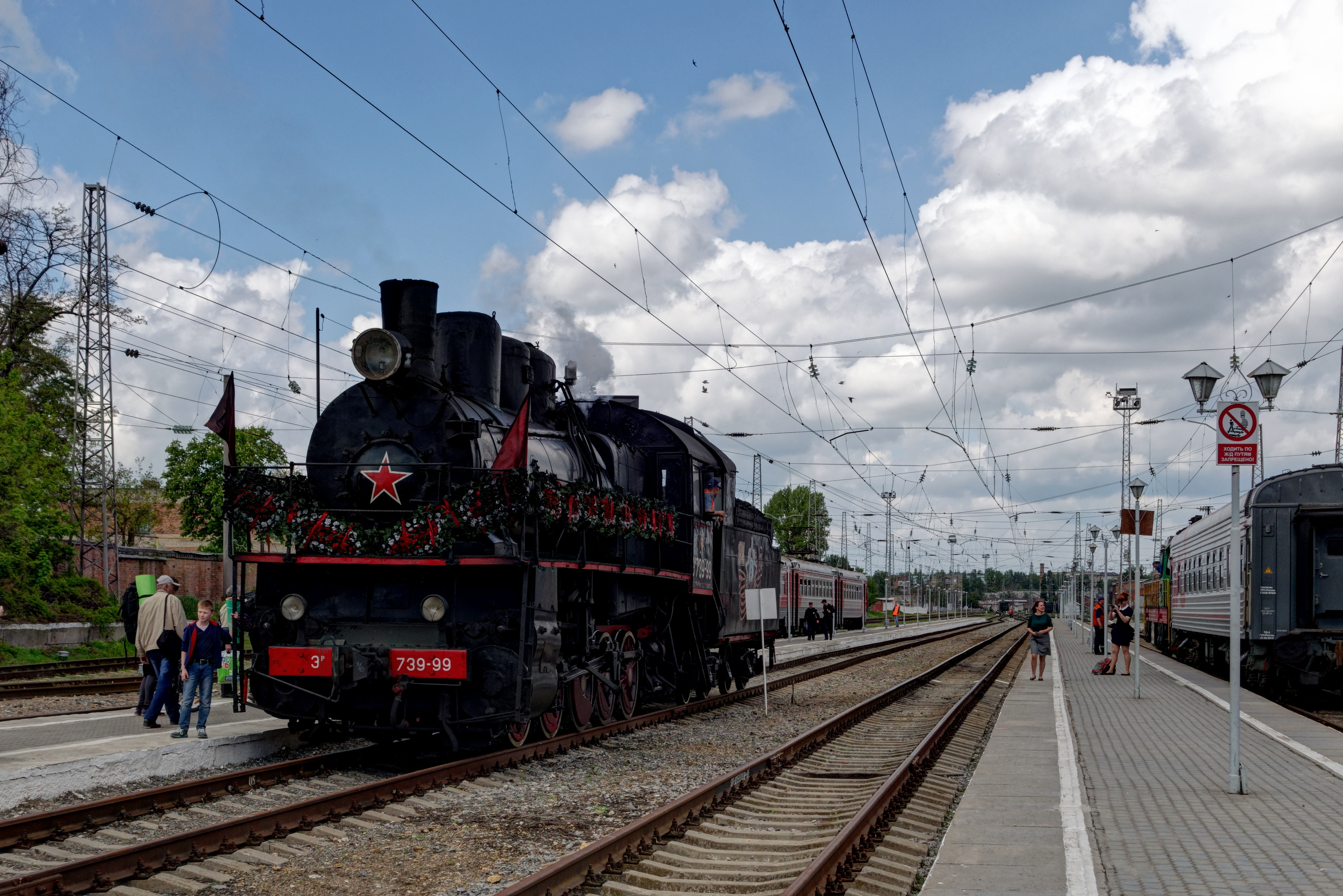
ER 739-99 steam locomotive at the station

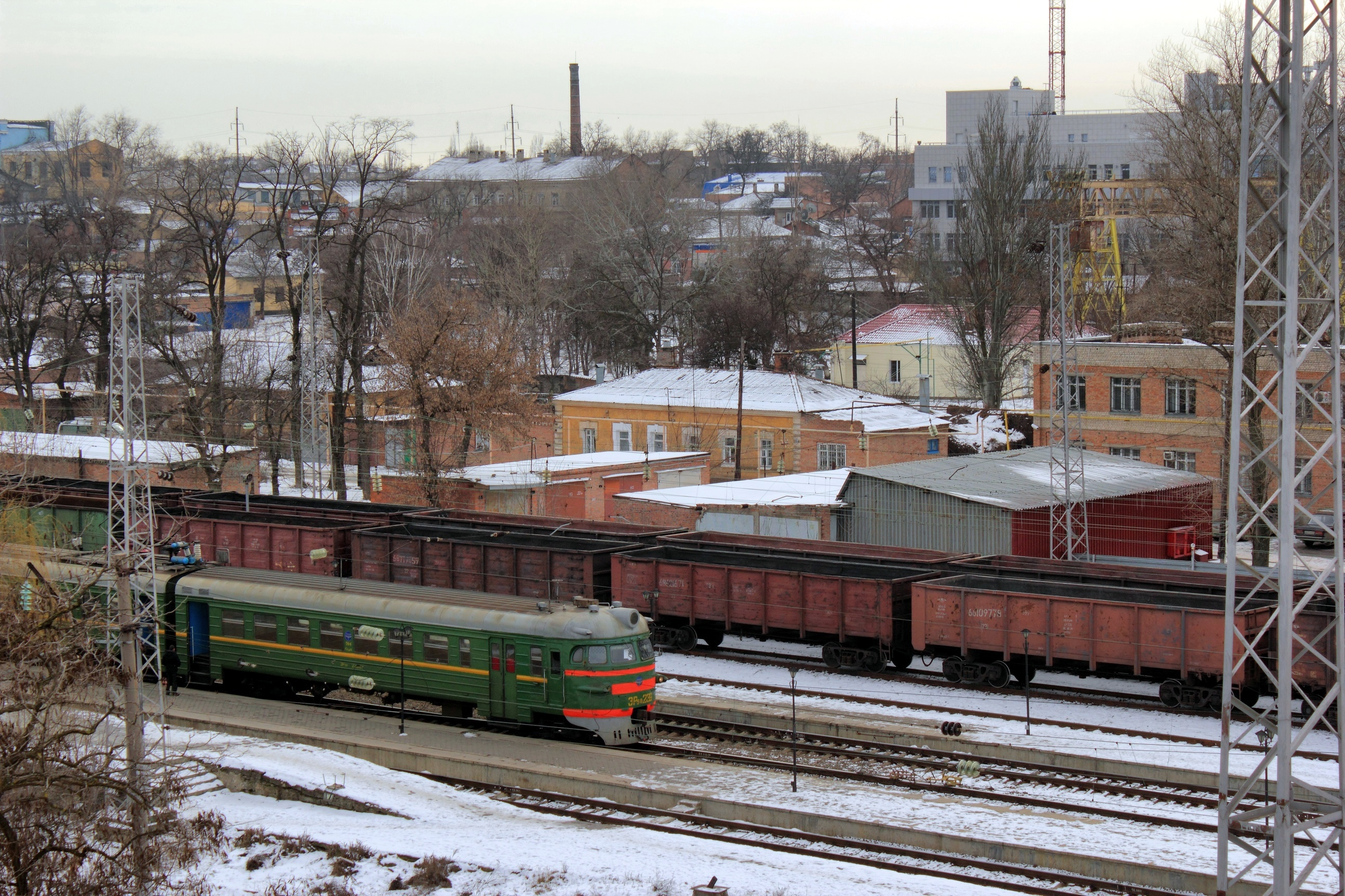
Station territory in 2011
