= Teatralnaya Square (Rostov-on-Don) =

City square in Rostov-on-Don, Russia

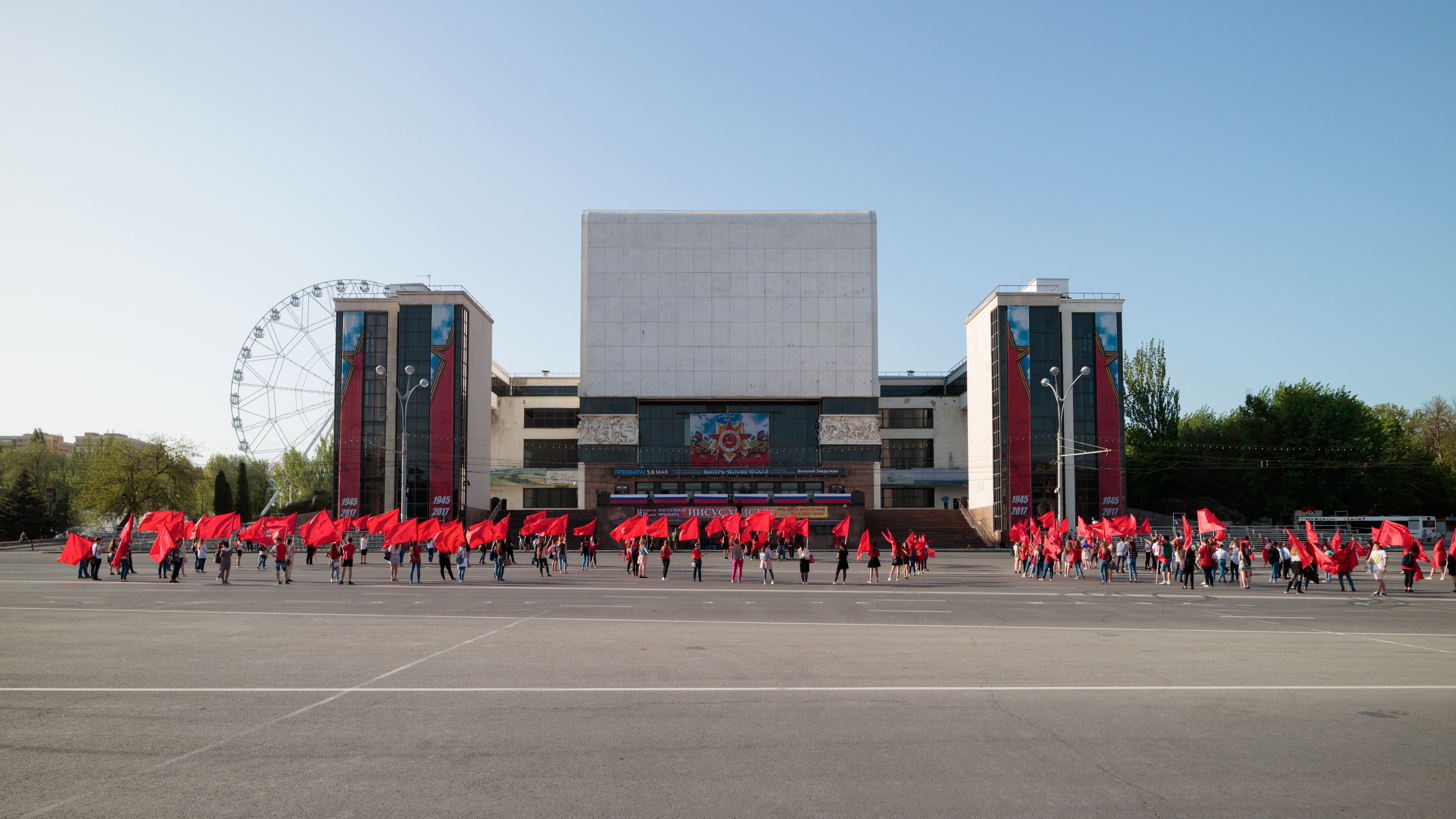
- Maxim Gorky Rostov-on-Don Drama Theatre at Teatralnaya Square
- Interactive map of Teatralnaya Square
- Location: Rostov-on-Don, Russia
- Coordinates: 47.1339°N 39.4441°E

Teatralnaya Square or Theatre Square (Russian: Театральная площадь) is the main city square of Rostov-on-Don, situated in Proletarsky District.

== History ==
In the 19th century on the site of the present-day Teatralnaya Square was a wasteland. It was situated just between Rostov-on-Don and Nakhichevan-on-Don cities.

In the 1920-1930s, this area was called Revolutsionnaya Square. After the construction of Maxim Gorky Rostov-on-Don Drama Theatre, the square changed its name to Teatralnaya.

Architectural appearance of the square had been changing after the construction of the theatre. Earlier, on the north-west side, there were situated the buildings of Nikolaevskaya City Hospital, constructed in 1890–1894 on the project of Rostov architect Nikolai Sokolov. In 1913 there was also constructed the Administration Building of the Vladikavkaz railway (architects – Andrei Butkov, Nikolai Walterж Modern style). On the south side of the square was built a five-story apartment house of railway workers in 1926. During the Great Patriotic War, the theatre building was badly damaged.

In the 1980s on the western side of the square there was constructed a new building of Rostov State Medical Institute.

=== Today ===
Today at the square there are situated the Main Directorate of the North Caucasus Railway, Maxim Gorky Rostov Academic Drama Theater and offices of several commercial companies.

Also there stands the Memorial dedicated to the liberators of Rostov-on-Don, erected for the 40th anniversary of victory in the Great Patriotic War. The monument is a stele 72 meters high, with a stylized gilded image of the Greek goddess Nike, which is dressed in a waterproof cape.

Next to the theater building there is an ensemble of fountains designed by architect Evgeniy Vuchetich. The fountain is a square pool with a central sculptural group on a pedestal consisting of four atlantes, who hold a bowl with uprising streams. The group is surrounded by curbstones with figures of frogs and turtles. There is a city legend that the young sculptor gave the muzzles of these amphibians the features of the faces of some city heads. The sculptures made of concrete.

=== World Cup 2018 ===
During the 2018 FIFA World Cup, championship matches were held in Rostov-on-Don at the newly built Rostov Arena stadium, and a fan zone for fans with a capacity of up to 25,000 people was organized on Theater Square. It housed a large screen, a stage, food outlets and entertainment sectors.

== Gallery ==
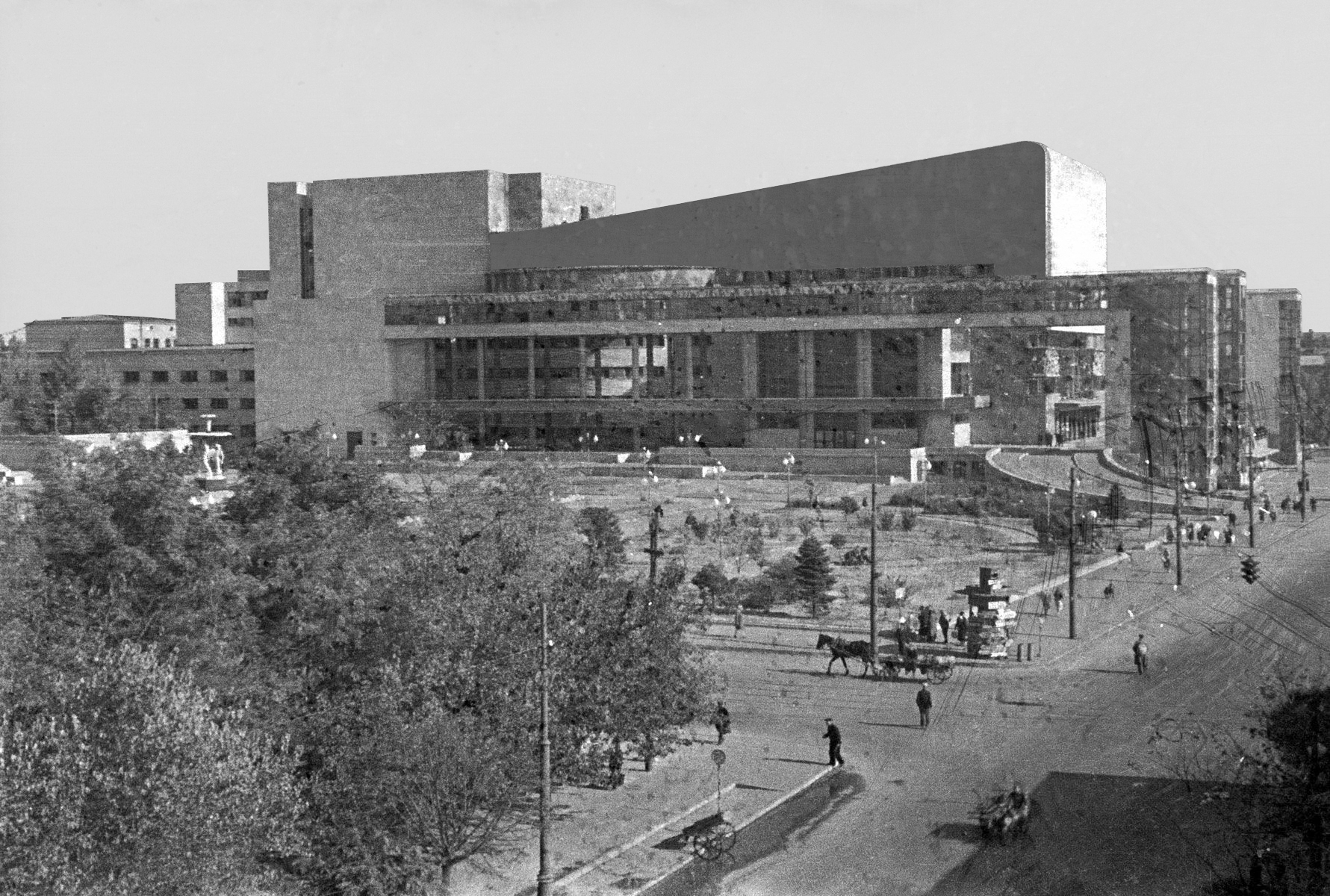
View of Teatralnaya Square in 1942

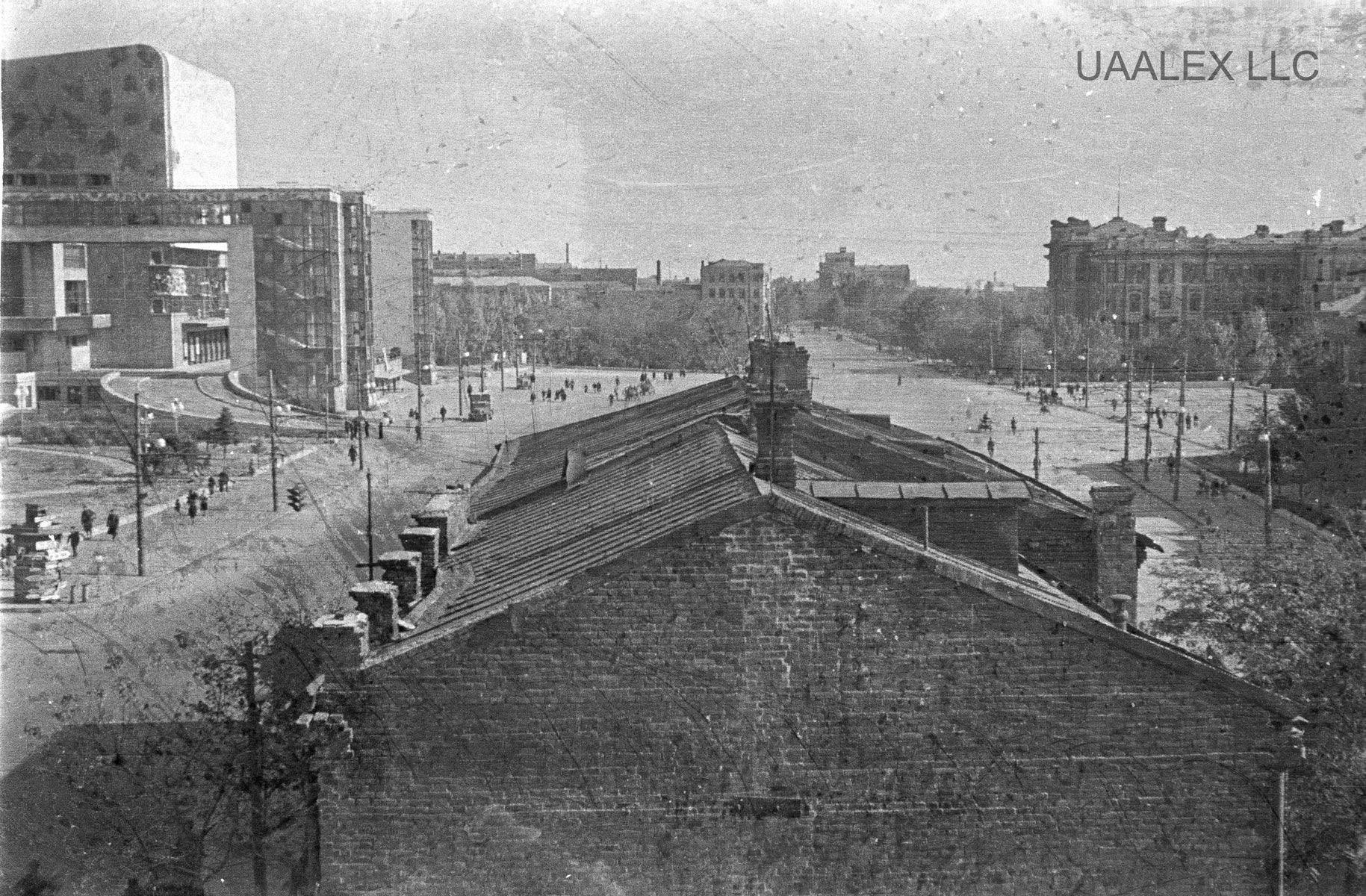
Another view of Teatralnaya Square in 1942

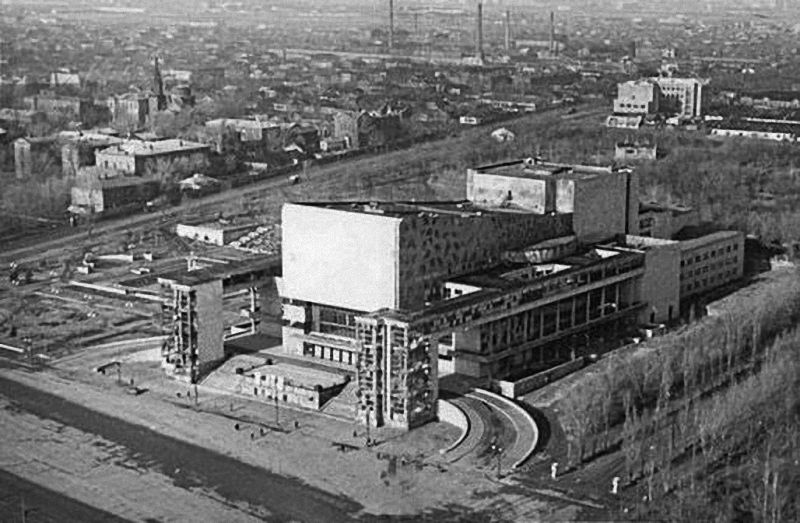
View of Drama Theatre in 1942

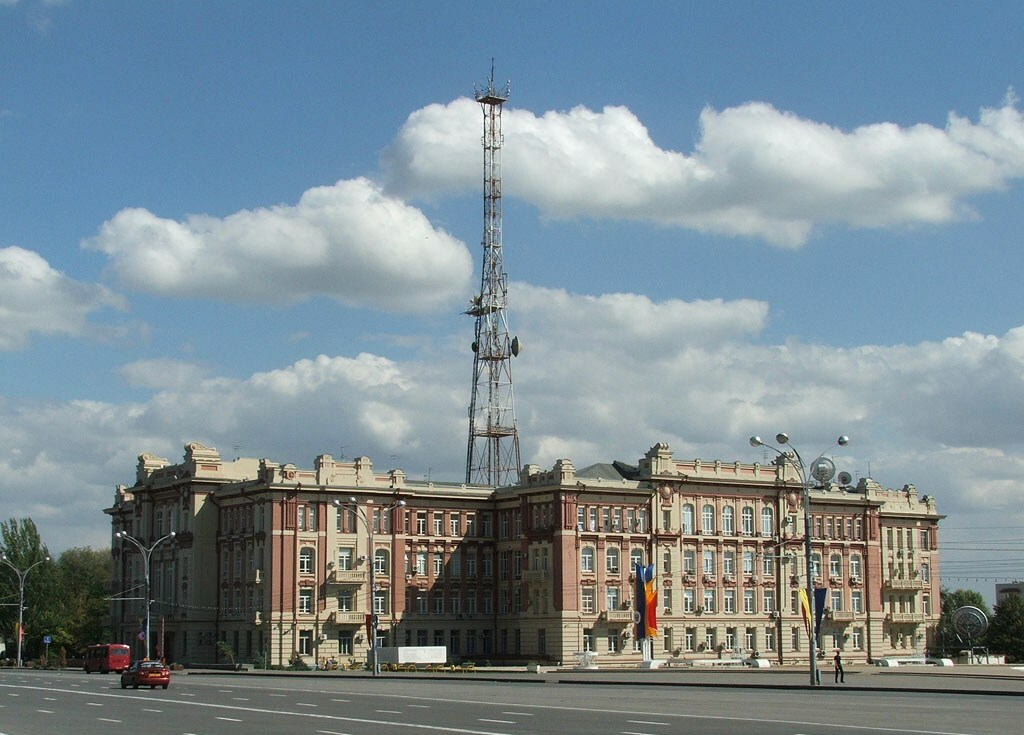
The Main Directorate of the North Caucasus Railway
