= North Caucasus Railway Administration Building =

Building in Rostov-on-Don, Russia

- Здание управления Северо-Кавказской железной дороги
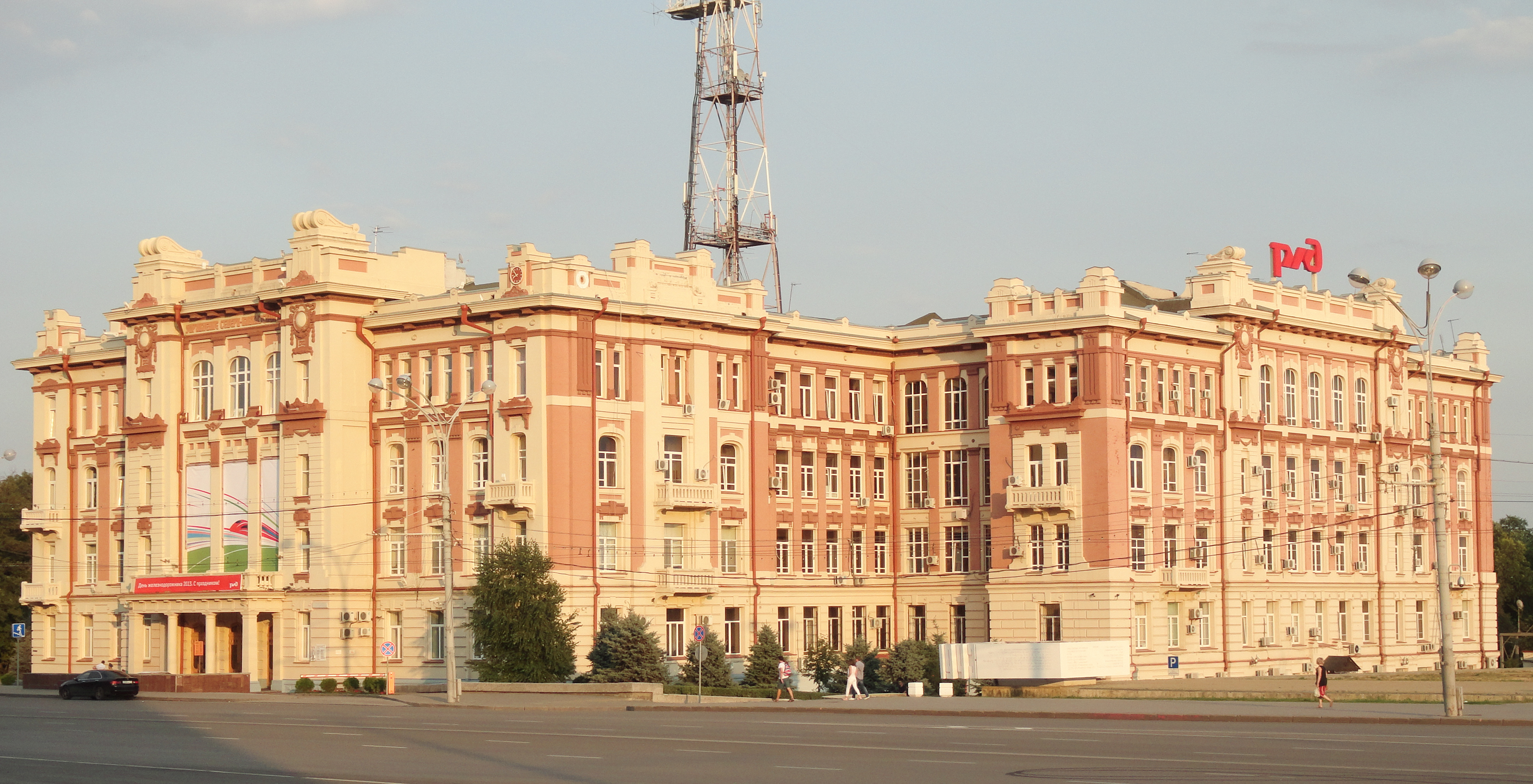
- Interactive map of the North Caucasus Railway Administration Building area

General information
- Architectural style: Art Nouveau
- Location: Rostov-on-Don, Russia
- Coordinates: 47°13′36″N 39°44′48″E
- Construction started: 1911
- Completed: 1913

The North Caucasus Railway Administration Building (Russian: Здание управления Северо-Кавказской железной дороги) is a building in Rostov-on-Don at Teatralnaya Square constructed from 1911–1913 in the Art Nouveau style. The building has the status of an object of cultural heritage of Russia of regional significance.

== History ==
The administration of the Vladikavkaz (now North Caucasus) Railway, situated in Rostov-on-Don, did not have its own building and occupied rented premises. At the beginning of the 20th century, a decision was made to construct a building for its administration. In 1910, a contest was held among architects, which was won by Nikolai Valter. Construction was done by civil engineer Andrei Butkov, who also made the drafts. For the building, land was acquired on the border of the cities of Rostov-on-Don and Nakhichevan-on-Don (the latter was incorporated into Rostov-on-Don's Proletarsky City District in the 1920s). Construction began in the summer of 1911 and was completed by autumn 1913. A consecration ceremony took place on 27 October 1913 (9 November New Style).

Problems with the building appeared soon after the construction had been completed. In autumn 1913, the newspaper Utro Yuga (Russian: «Утро Юга») reported "incredible dampness", because of which "telephone wires often do not work." Management officials also complained about poor ventilation. In addition, the article noted that "the building was constructed on a draft drawn more than three years ago, and now, in view of the increase of the number of the staff in this period, it turned out to be too small. All the rooms are so full that the projected norm does not correspond to the present reality".

In the 1920s, the building housed the Administration of the North Caucasus Railway. In the mid-1930s, the Administration of Voroshilovskoye Railway was situated there. During the Great Patriotic War, the roof, rafters, attic, windows and doors were destroyed. From 1948–1949, the building was reconstructed. In the early 2000s, facades were refurbished.

== Architecture ==
The building of the North Caucasus Railway Administration became the first building at Teatralnaya Square. It dominated the surrounding low-rise buildings. The building was constructed in the tradition of the rationalistic direction of Art Nouveau style, but at the same time, its architecture and design traces the motifs of Eclecticism.

The four-story building occupies a block in plan and has three courtyards. The color scheme of the facade is composed of red and ocher colors. The brickwork of the building is combined with plastered surfaces. The facades are decorated with relief emblems of Vladikavkaz Railway. The first floor is rusticated. The railway director's office was on the second floor, with its large windows facing the main facade.

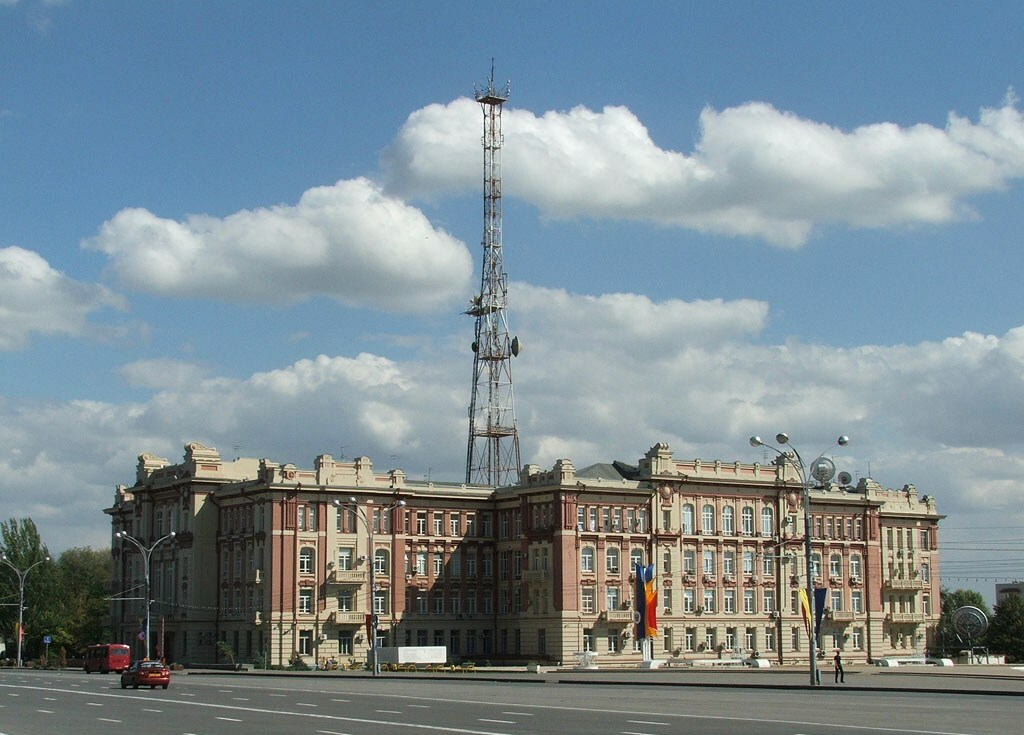

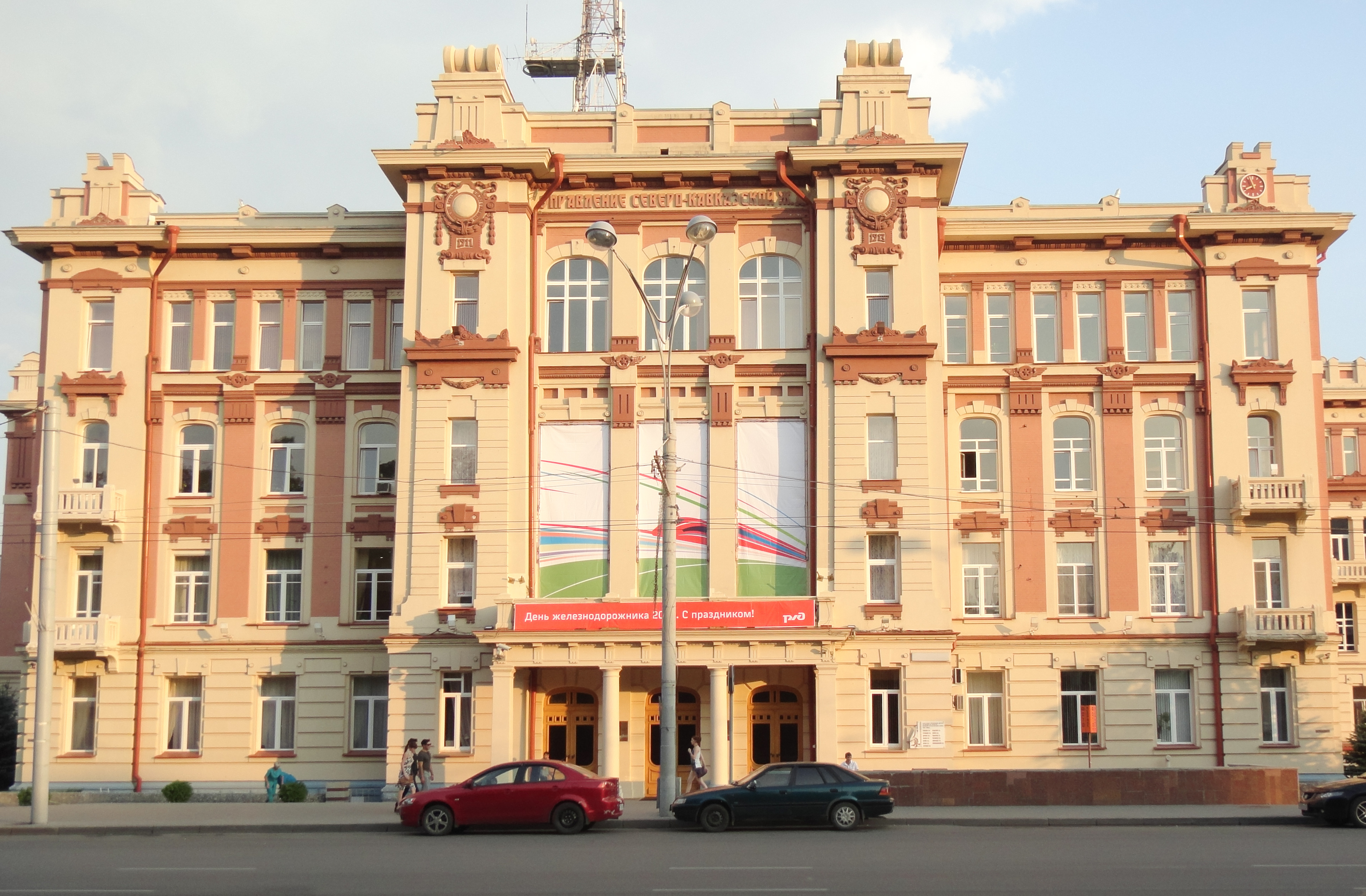

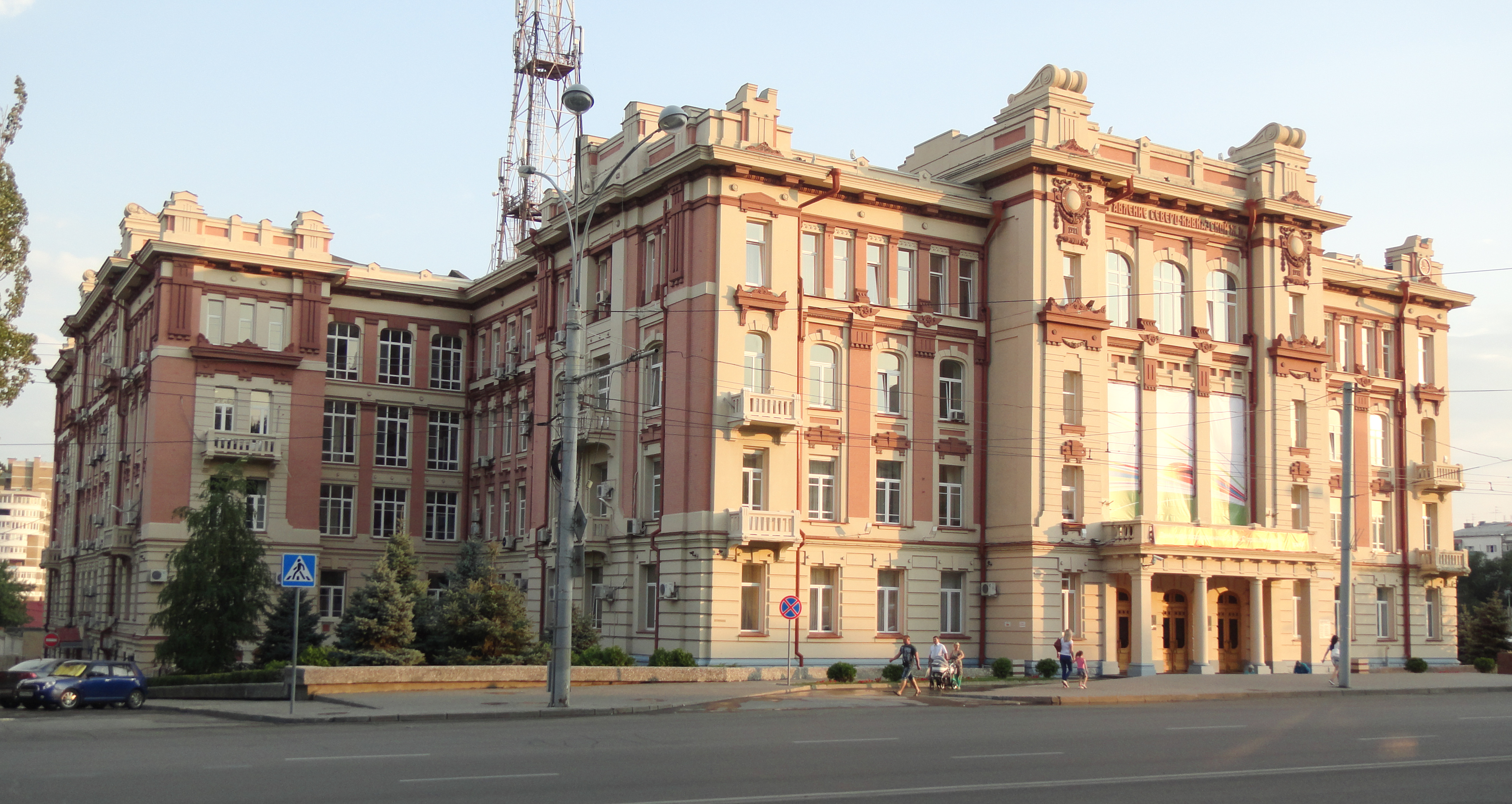
