= North Caucasus Railway =

Railway division in Russia

Северо-Кавказская железная дорога North Caucasus Railway
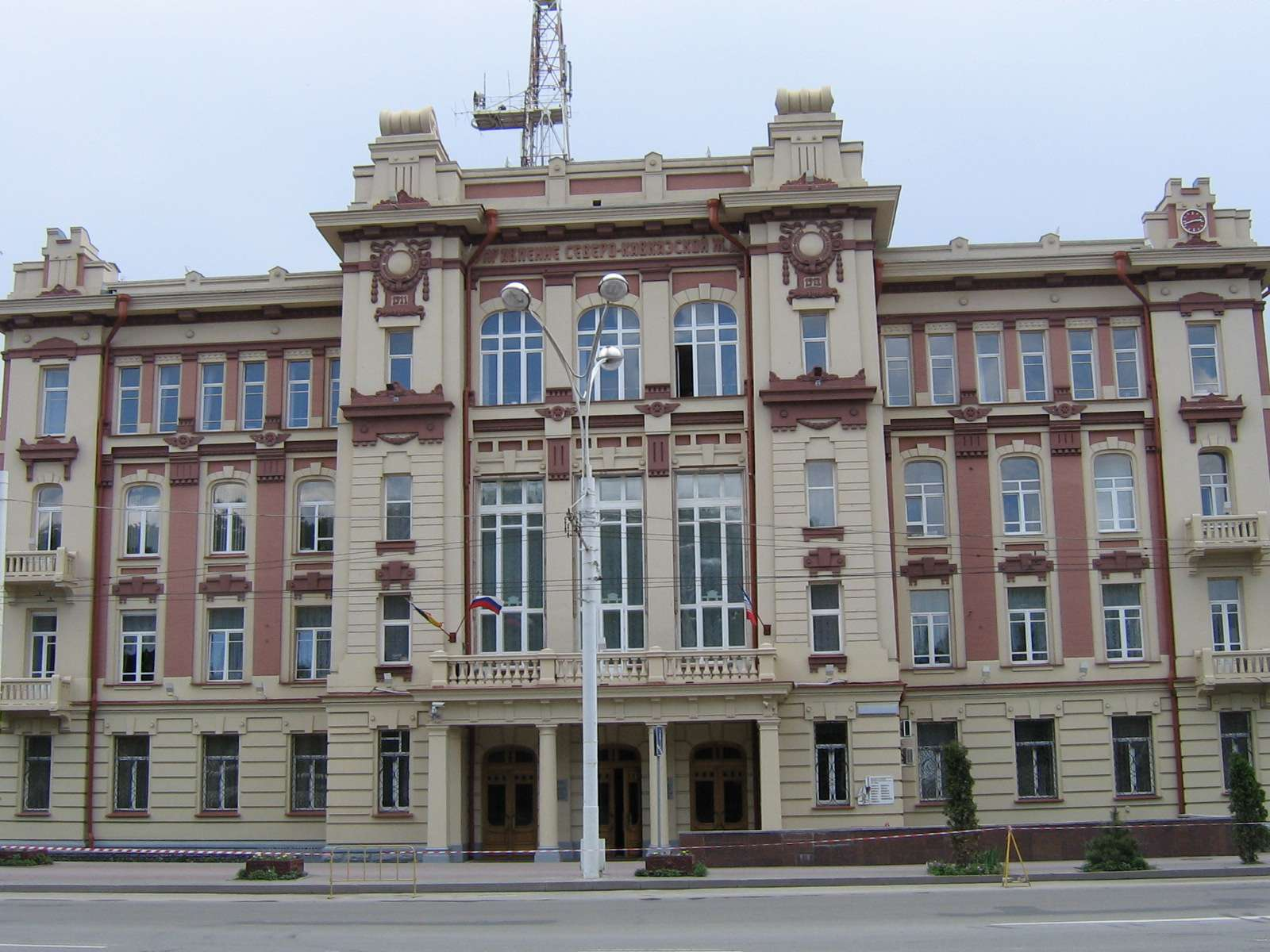
- North Caucasus Railway Administration Building, Rostov-on-Don

Overview
- Headquarters: Rostov-on-Don
- Locale: Russia
- Dates of operation: 1922–present
- Predecessor: North Caucasus Railway (USSR, Russian Empire)

Technical
- Track gauge: 1,520 mm (4 ft 11 27/32 in)
- Length: 6,315.9 km (3,920 mi)

Other
- Website: Press here

The North Caucasus Railway (Russian: Северо-Кавказская железная дорога) is a 1,520 mm (4 ft 11 27/32 in) broad gauge Russian railway network that links the Sea of Azov (in the west) and Caspian Sea (in the east). It runs through ten federal subjects: Rostov Oblast, Krasnodar Krai, Stavropol Krai, Republic of Adygeya, Karachay–Cherkessia, North Ossetia, Ingushetia, Chechnya, Dagestan, and Kalmykia. The headquarters are the North Caucasus Railway Administration Building in Rostov-on-Don.

The network comprises Grozny, Krasnodar, Makhachkala, Mineralnye Vody, and Rostov passenger and freight railways, as well as two children's railways (in Vladikavkaz and Rostov). As of 2005, there were 6315.9 km of railtrack and 403 railway stations. The railway is operated by the Russian Railways and employs 80,757 people.

The Black Sea resorts of Sochi, Gelendzhik and Anapa are the principal passenger destinations on the railway. The Sochi line, running for many miles along the coast of the Black Sea, is especially busy in summer with regular extra direct express trains for holiday makers. The oil ports at Novorossiysk and Tuapse are significant destinations for rail freight traffic.

== Major railway stations ==
- Rostov-on-Don
- Bataysk
- Taganrog-II
- Likhaya
- Tikhoretskaya
- Kavkazskaya
- Armavir
- Mineralnye Vody
- Makhachkala
- Timashevskaya
- Krasnodar
- Tuapse
- Belorechenskaya
- Salsk
- Novorossiysk
- Novocherkassk

== Construction timeline ==
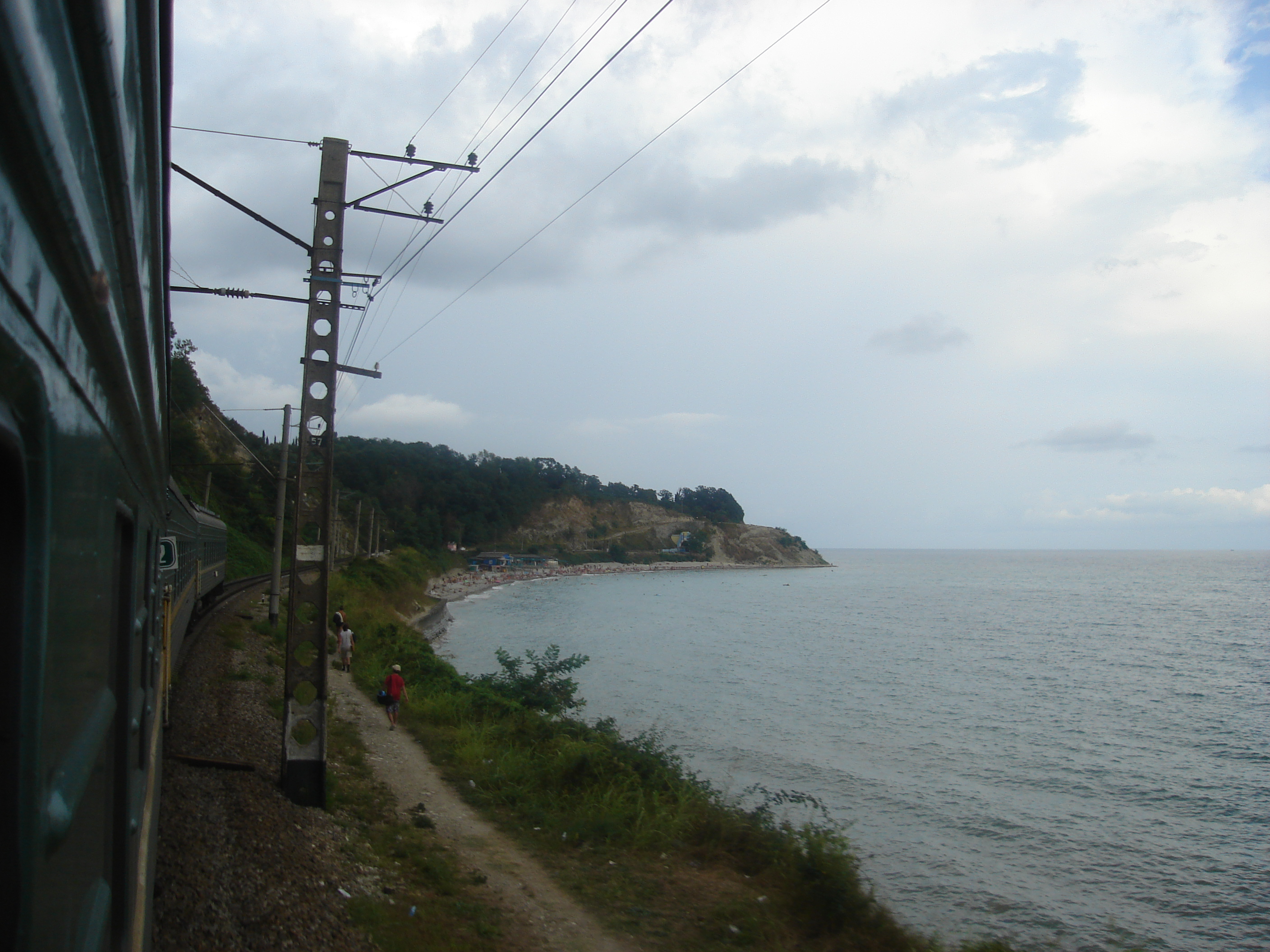
The Kazan-Adler train running along the coast of the Black Sea

- 1861 Shakhtnaya–Aksay (the first rail line in Northern Caucasus)
- 1871 Zverevo–Shakhtnaya
- 1872 Rostov-on-Don–Vladikavkaz
- 1875 Aksay–Rostov-on-Don
- 1888 Tikhoretskaya-Novorossisk
- 1897-Kavkazskaya-Stavropol
- 1901 Kavkazskaya–Krasnodar
- 1911 Bataysk–Azov
- 1911 Sosyka–Yeysk
- 1911 Armavir–Maikop
- 1912 Belorechenskaya–Tuapse
- 1914 Krasnodar–Akhtari
- 1914 Krymskaya–Timashevsk–Kushchevka
- 1915 Bataysk–Salsk
- 1915 Prokhladnaya–Gudermes
- 1916 Palagiada–Vinodelnoye
- 1923 Tuapse–Sochi
- 1927 Sochi–Matsesta–Adler
- 1928 Petrovskoye Selo–Blagodarnoye
- 1931 Vinodelnoye–Divnoye
- 1931 Rostov-on-Don–Khapry
- 1931 Komsomolskaya–Neftegorsk
- 1931 Maikop–Khadzhokh
- 1940 Labinskaya–Shedok
- 1942 Gudermes–Astrakhan
- 1942 Adler–Sukhumi
- 1944 Krymskaya–Starotitarovka
- 1969 Divnoye–Elista
- 1971 Zverevo–Krasnodonskaya
- 1977 Anapa–Yurovsky
- 1978 Krasnodar–Tuapse
- 1987 Blagodarnoye–Budyonnovsk
- 1989 Peshchanokopskaya–Krasnaya Gvardiya

In 1937 the North Caucasus Railway was renamed after the Soviet party leader Sergo Ordzhonikidze but soon reverted to its traditional name. It was in the late 1950s that most of the railway network was electrified.

In 1987 the line from Zverevo north to Chertkovo was transferred from the South Eastern Railway to the North Caucasus Railway, with the new connection between the two railways being just north of Chertkovo railway station.
