= Azov railway station =

Railway station in Azov, Russia

Azov Азов
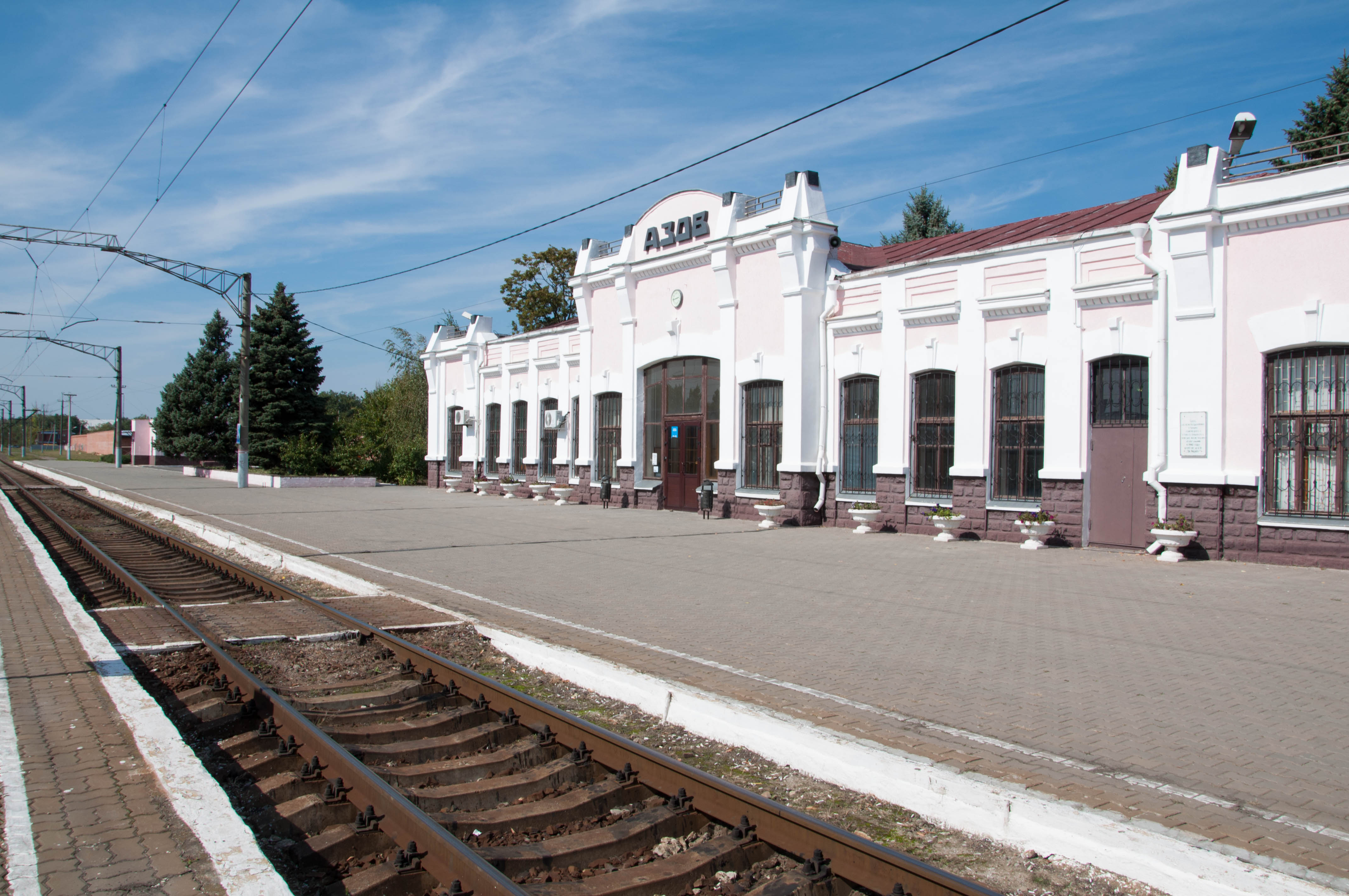
- View of the station from platforms

General information
- Location: 31, Privokzalnaya Street, Azov, Russia
- Coordinates: 47.098709°N 39.417571°E
- Platforms: 3
- Tracks: 8

Construction
- Platform levels: 1
- Parking: yes

Other information
- Station code: 510806

History
- Opened: 1911
Location

Azov (Russian: Азов) is a second class cargo-and-passenger railway station in Azov, Rostov oblast, Russia. It is a terminal station for the Rostov-on-Don — Azov railway. The station hosts freight and passenger suburban trains from Rostov-on-Don. Electric trains ER9 and railbuses RA1 make a passenger trips from Azov. Freight trains (to 100 wagons per day) deliver to the sea port coal, building materials, rubble, lumber and others. There are 45 persons working in the station.

== History ==
The railway station in Azov was opened on 6 December 1910. The first train arrived on the same day. The station handled many passenger trains until 1920s. Then began a period of decline as the number of trains decreased. In connection with the growth rate in Azov sea port, many freight trains started proceeding in state through the station. Azov station was electrified AC in 1966. Objects of local cultural heritage on the station such as the terminus building, historic home, and warehouse were restored for the 100-years jubilee.

== Operation ==
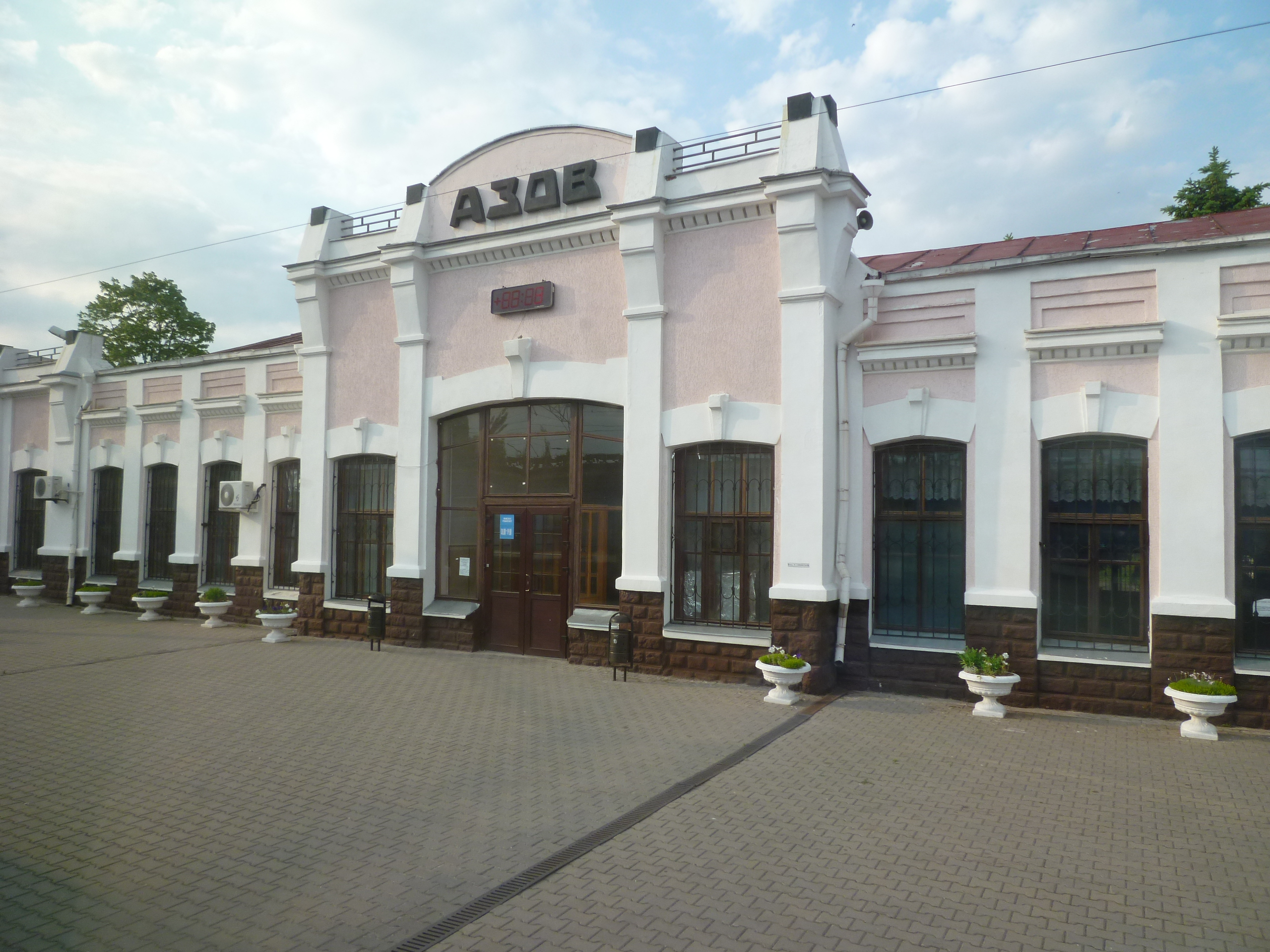
Azov station in 2011

Today's infrastructure of the station consists of the station building, two low passenger platforms and three cargo platforms, building of station operator, warehouse, walking bridge over west yard neck. Station layout consists of 8 tracks (the first five tracks are electrified). Non-electrified tracks run towards the sea port and industry. Since 1950, movement on the station is provided mainly freight trains, which proceed in state to the port for transshipment of cargo to ships (either river service ships or seagoing vessels).
