= To the Liberators of Rostov =

Soviet military memorial in Rostov-on-Don

Coordinates: 47°13′33″N 39°44′45″E

- Освободителям Ростова
- Russia
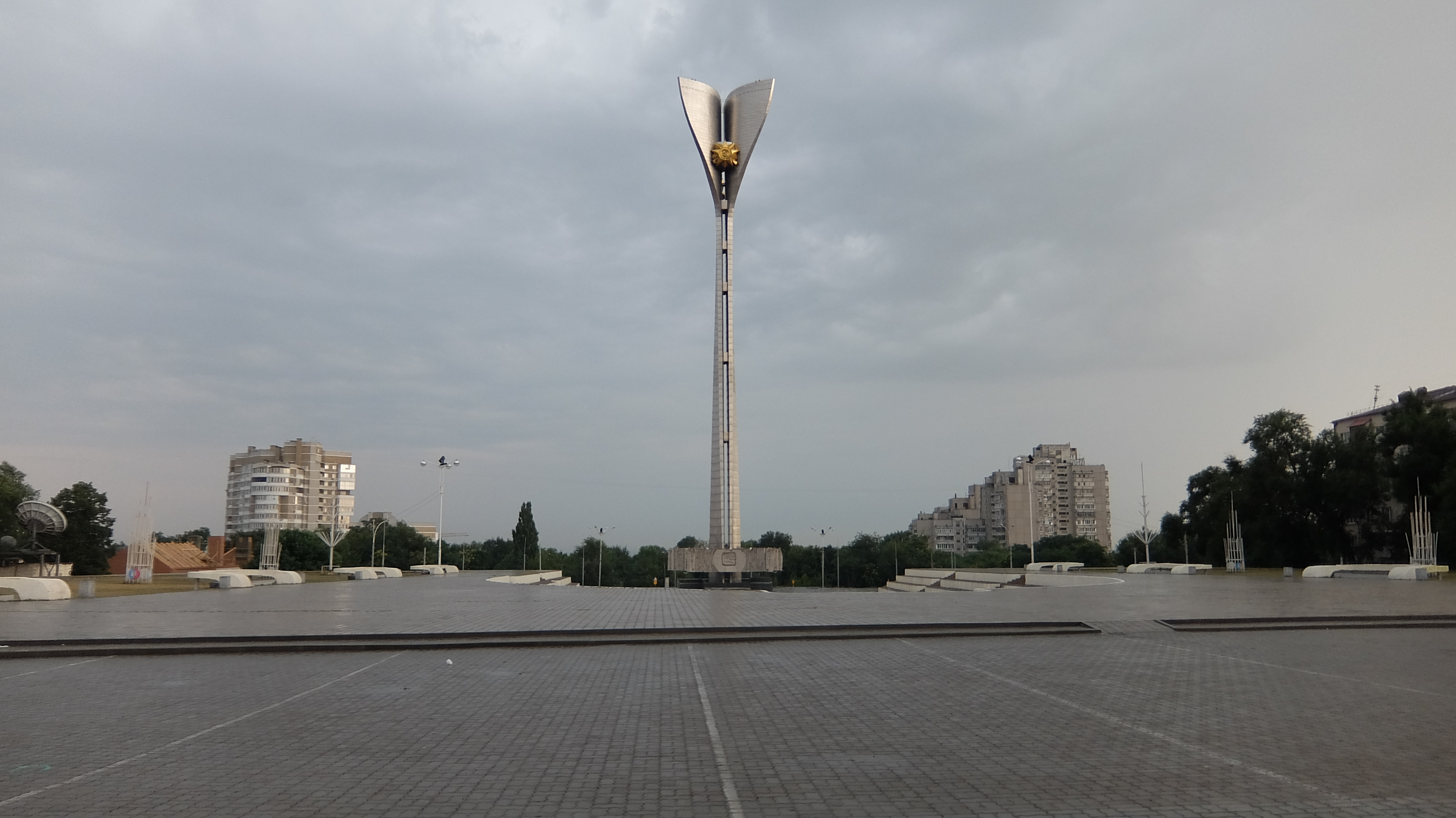
- For 40th anniversary of the liberation of Rostov-on-Don
- Unveiled: 8 May 1983
- Location: Teatralnaya Square, Rostov-on-Don, Russia
- Designed by: Y. Rukavishnikov, A. Filippova, N. Milovidov

To the Warriors-Liberators of Rostov-on-Don from the Nazi Invaders (Russian: Воинам-освободителям города Ростова-на-Дону от немецко-фашистских захватчиков) is a stele that was erected in Teartralnaya square in Rostov-on-Don, Russia, to commemorate the 40th anniversary of the city’s liberation from the Nazi forces in 1943. The unveiling ceremony took place on 8 May, 1983. The memorial reminds city residents and visitors of the Great Patriotic War.

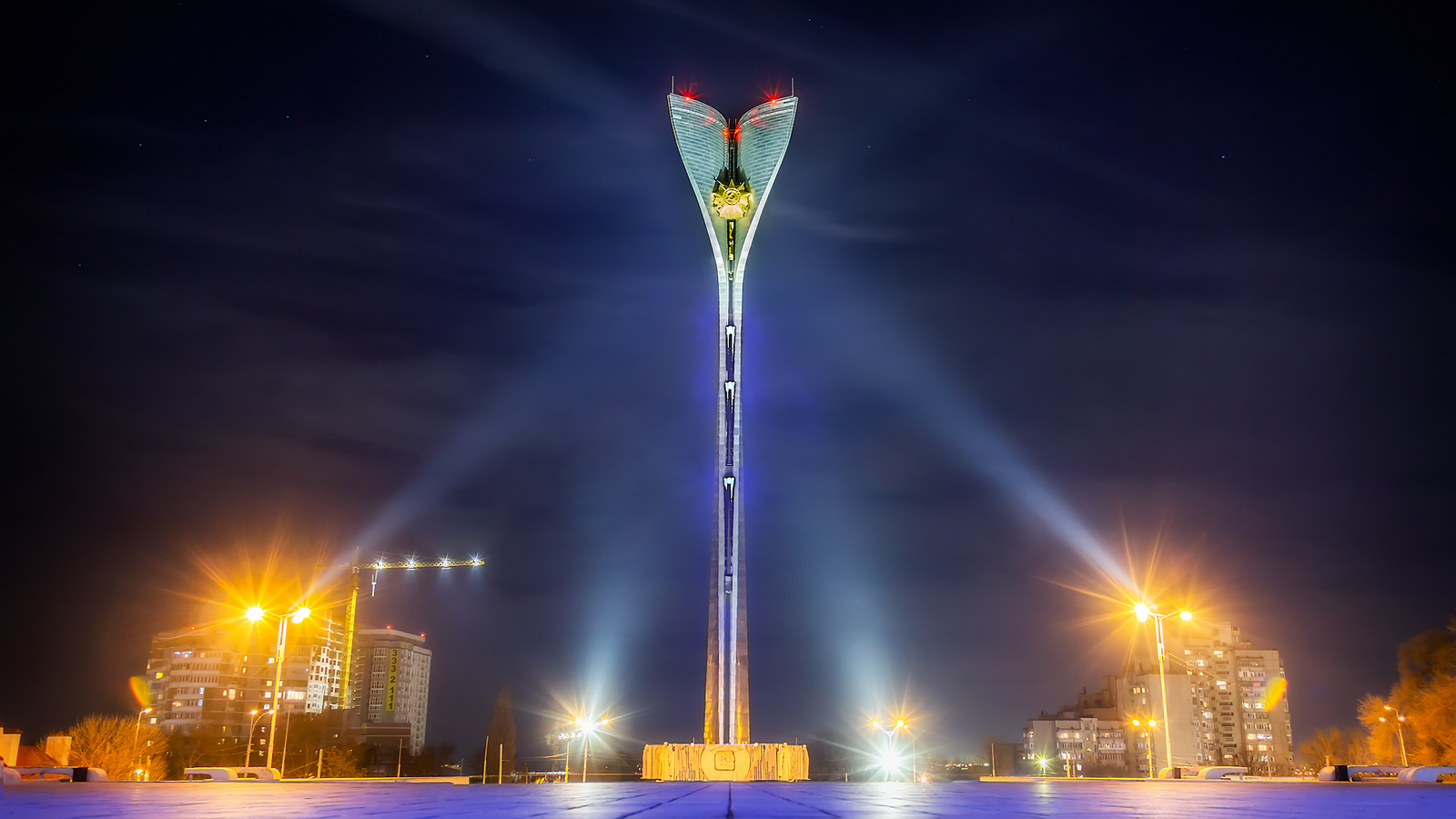
The stele at night

== History ==
It was decided to erect a memorial to the soldiers in Rostov immediately after its liberation, in February 1943, following a citizens' meeting in the Teatralnaya Square. The project for the monument and the adjacent park was repeatedly planned, but the city budget didn't have the necessary funds, so the project was put on hold. In the 1980s, the issue of building the monument was raised again. This time, the design by sculptor Yulian Rukavishnikov and architects A. N. Filippova and N. N. Milovidov was chosen, and it was completed in 1980.

== Description ==
A stele rises 72 meters (78,7 yd) high, and topped by 100-tonne finial in the shape of a ship's prow. On the Don River side, the stele is adorned with a sculpture of the winged goddess of victory, Nike (in Soviet Union it was claimed to be the Motherland), and on the Teatralnaya Square side, a model of the Order of the Patriotic War.

== Gallery ==
Stele decoration

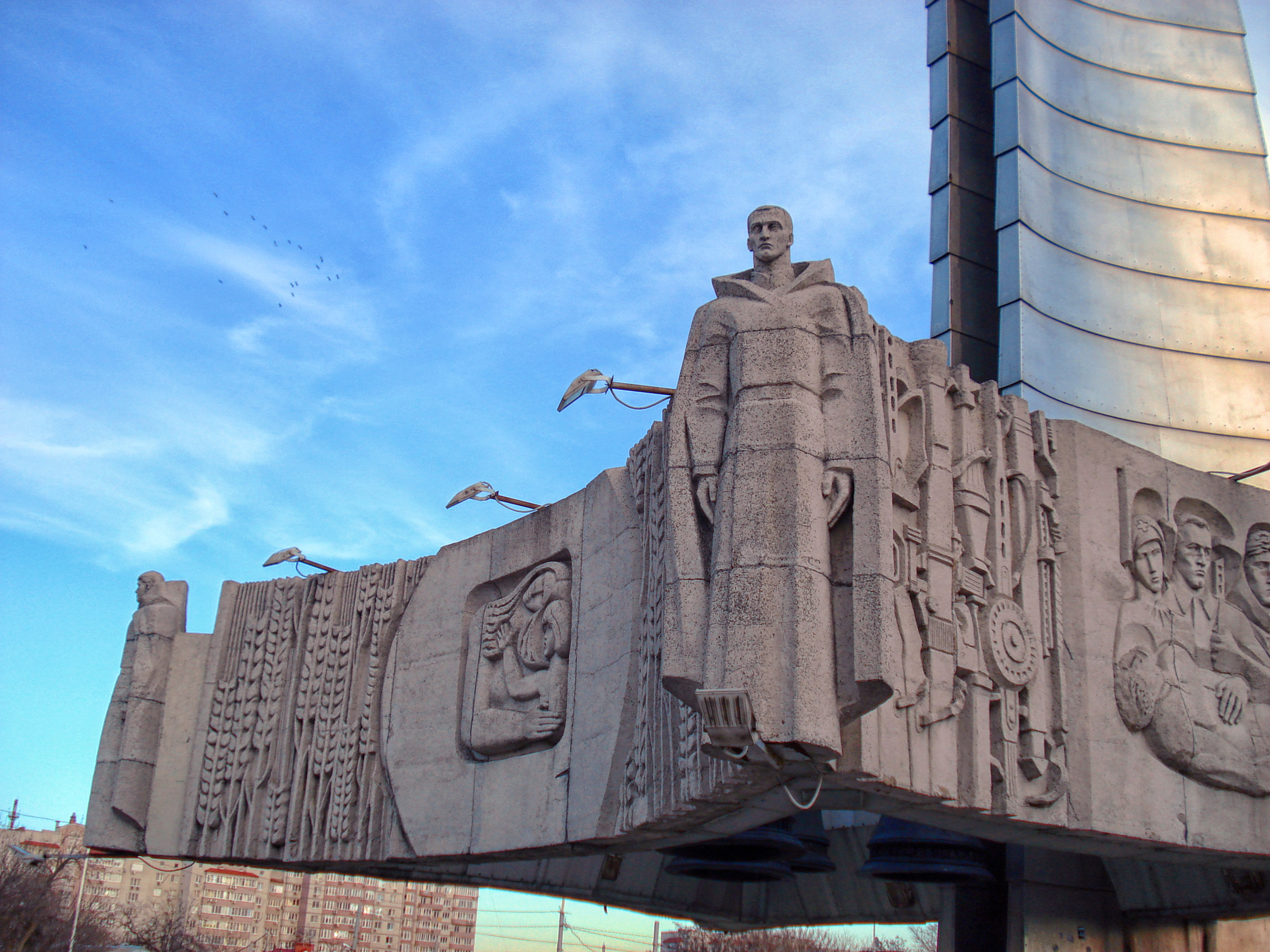
The tuff relief, front view

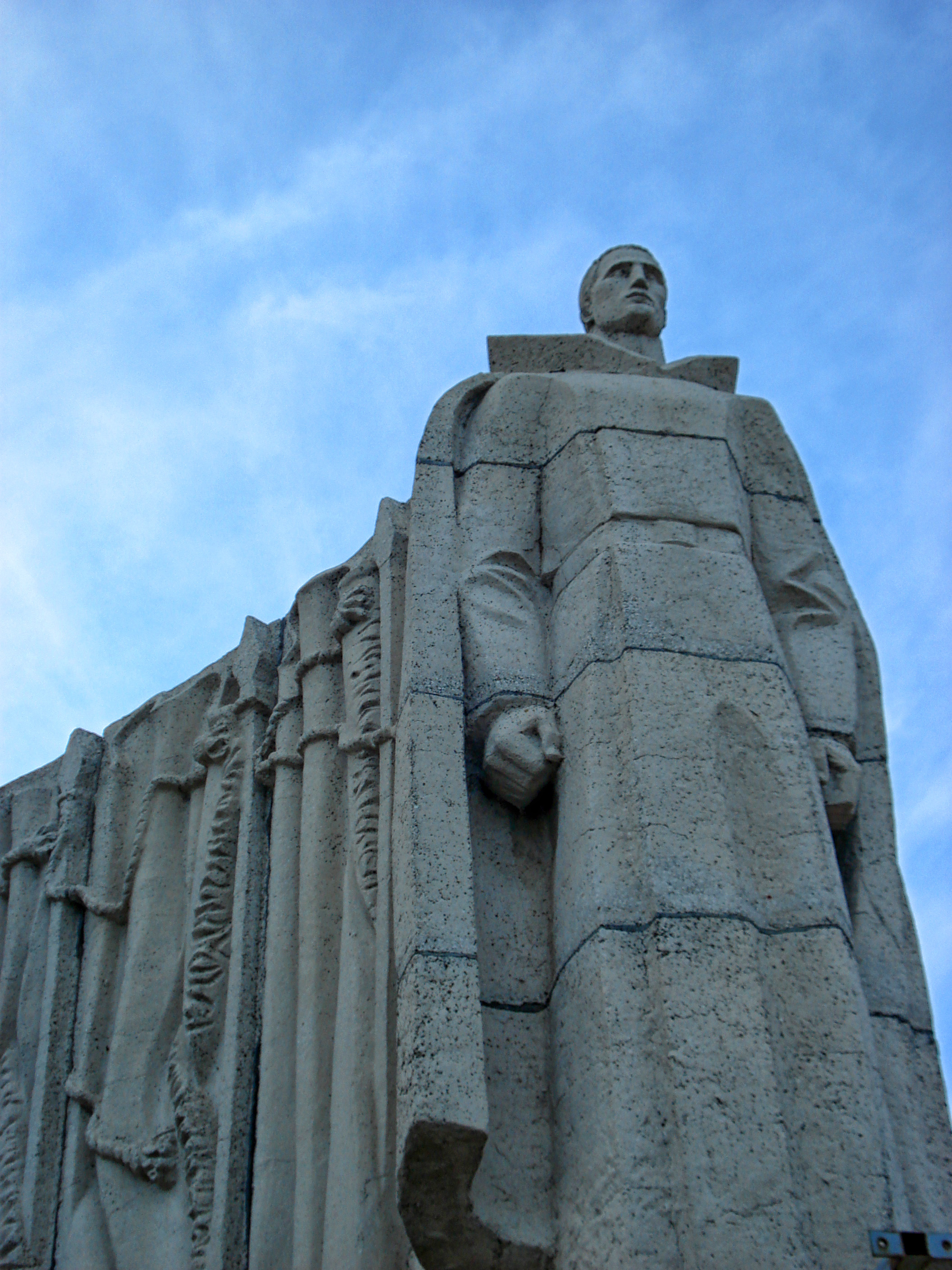
Fragment, front view

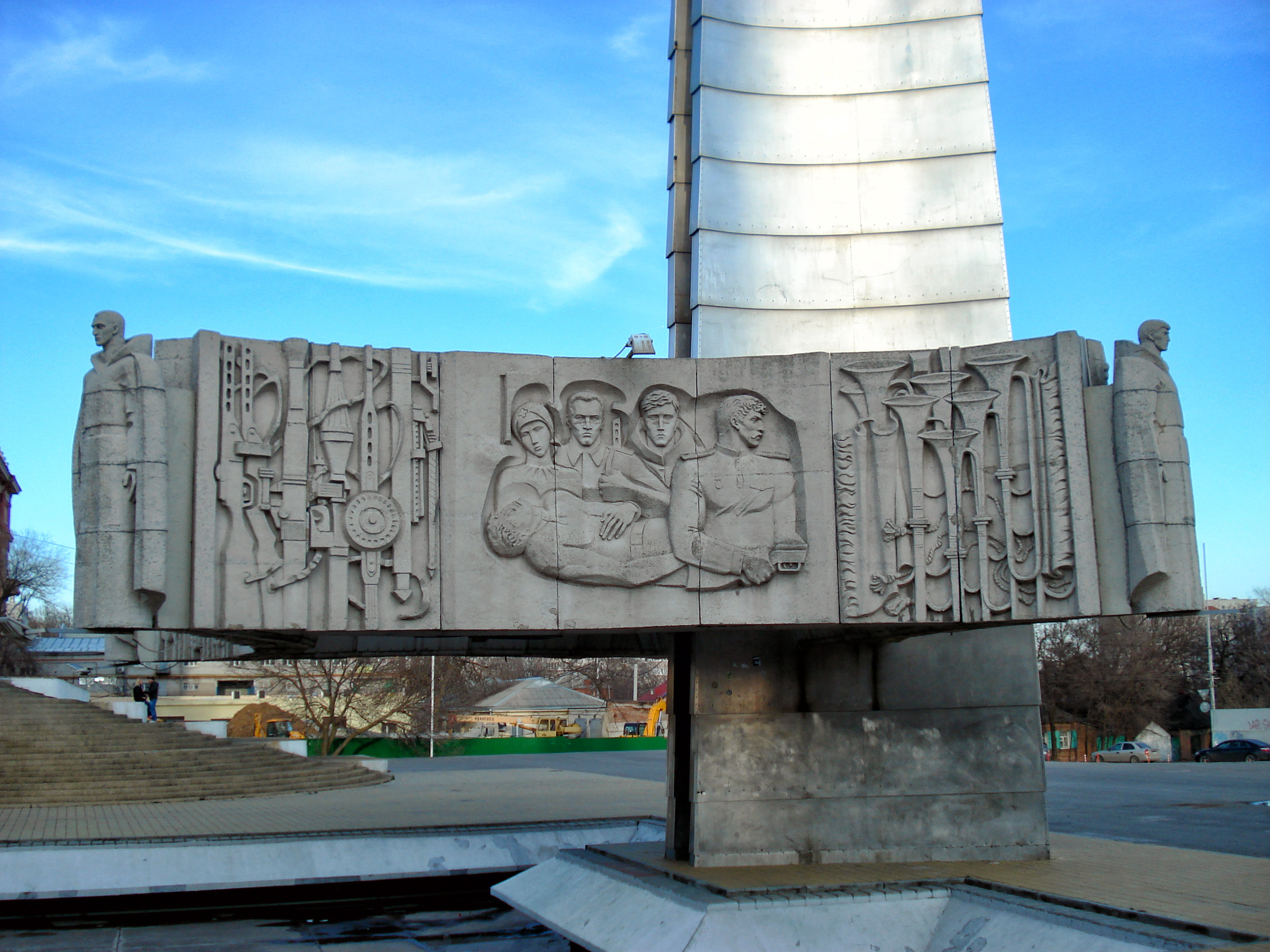
Side view

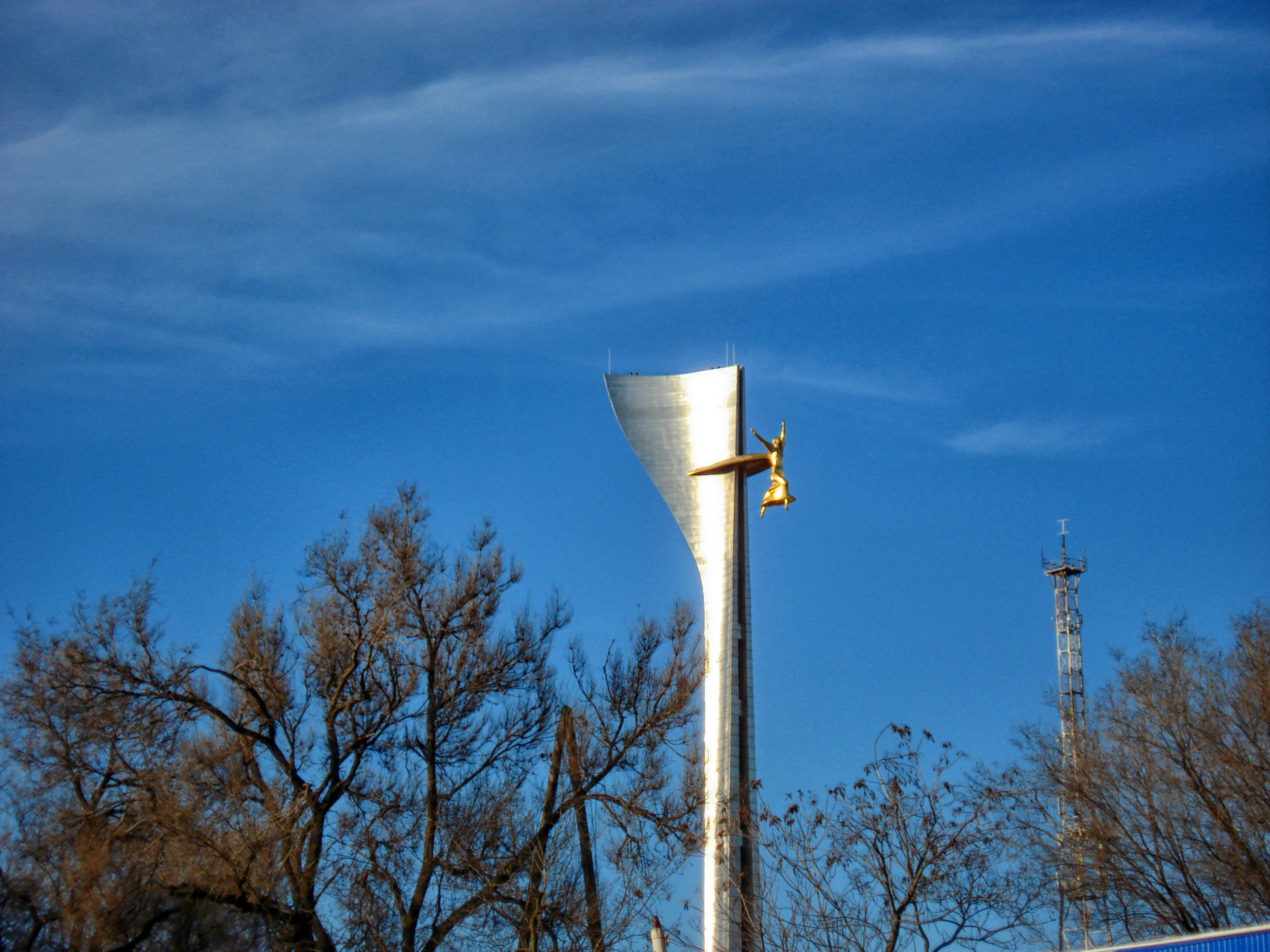
The goddess Nike sculpture
