= Novocherkassk railway station =

Railway station in Novocherkassk, Rostov, Russia

Novocherkassk Новочеркасск
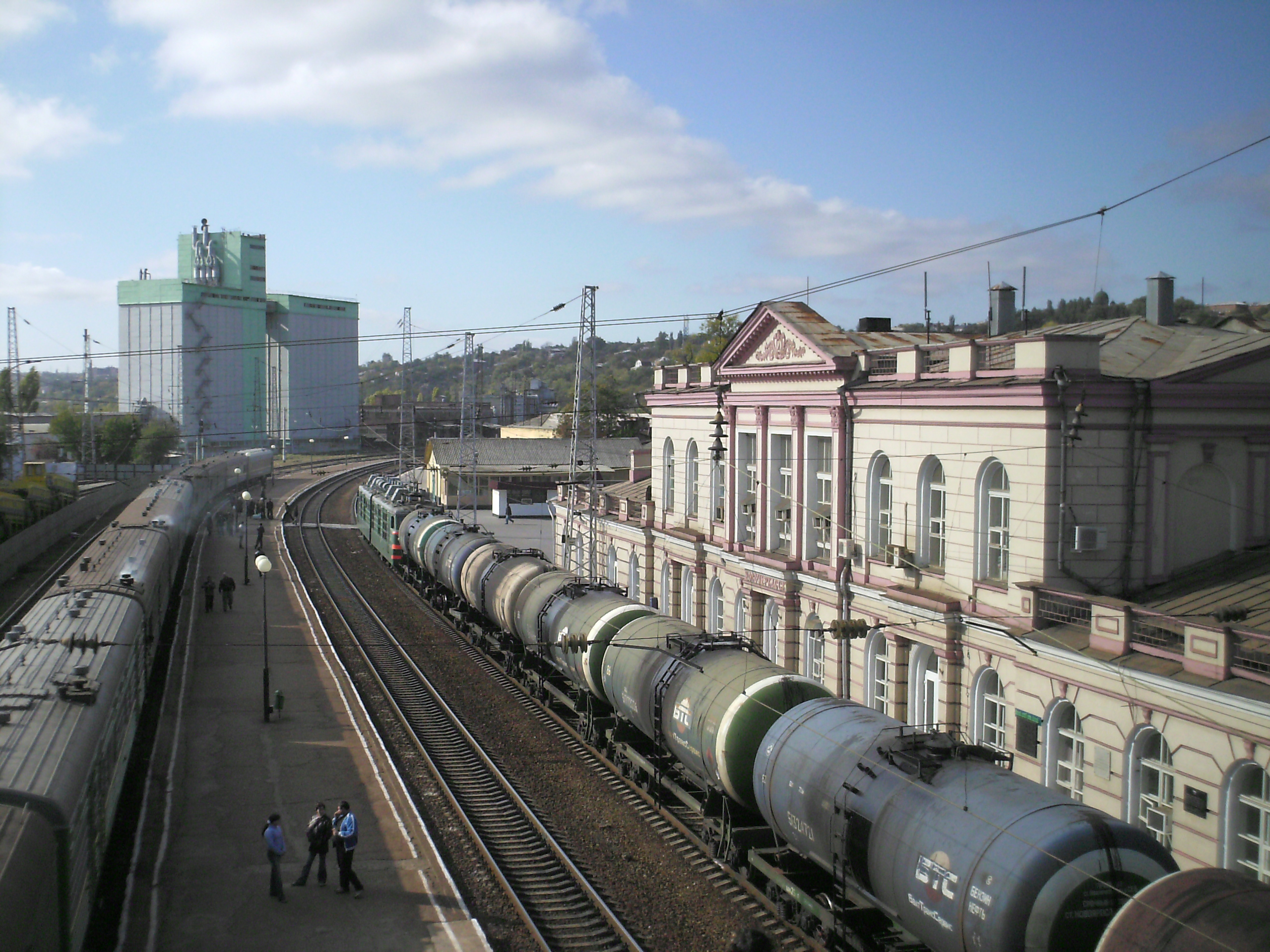
- View of the station from the walking bridge

General information
- Location: 1, Vokzalnaya st., Novocherkassk, Russia
- Coordinates: 47.404722°N 40.117122°E
- Platforms: 2
- Tracks: 6

Construction
- Platform levels: 2
- Parking: yes

Other information
- Station code: 513503

History
- Opened: 1863
- Rebuilt: 1950s
Location

Novocherkassk railway station (Russian: станция Новочеркасск) is a railway station in Novocherkassk, Rostov oblast, Russia. It is a terminus for the Aksay — Shakhty railway and other lines running from Central and South Russia and Eastern Ukraine.

== History ==
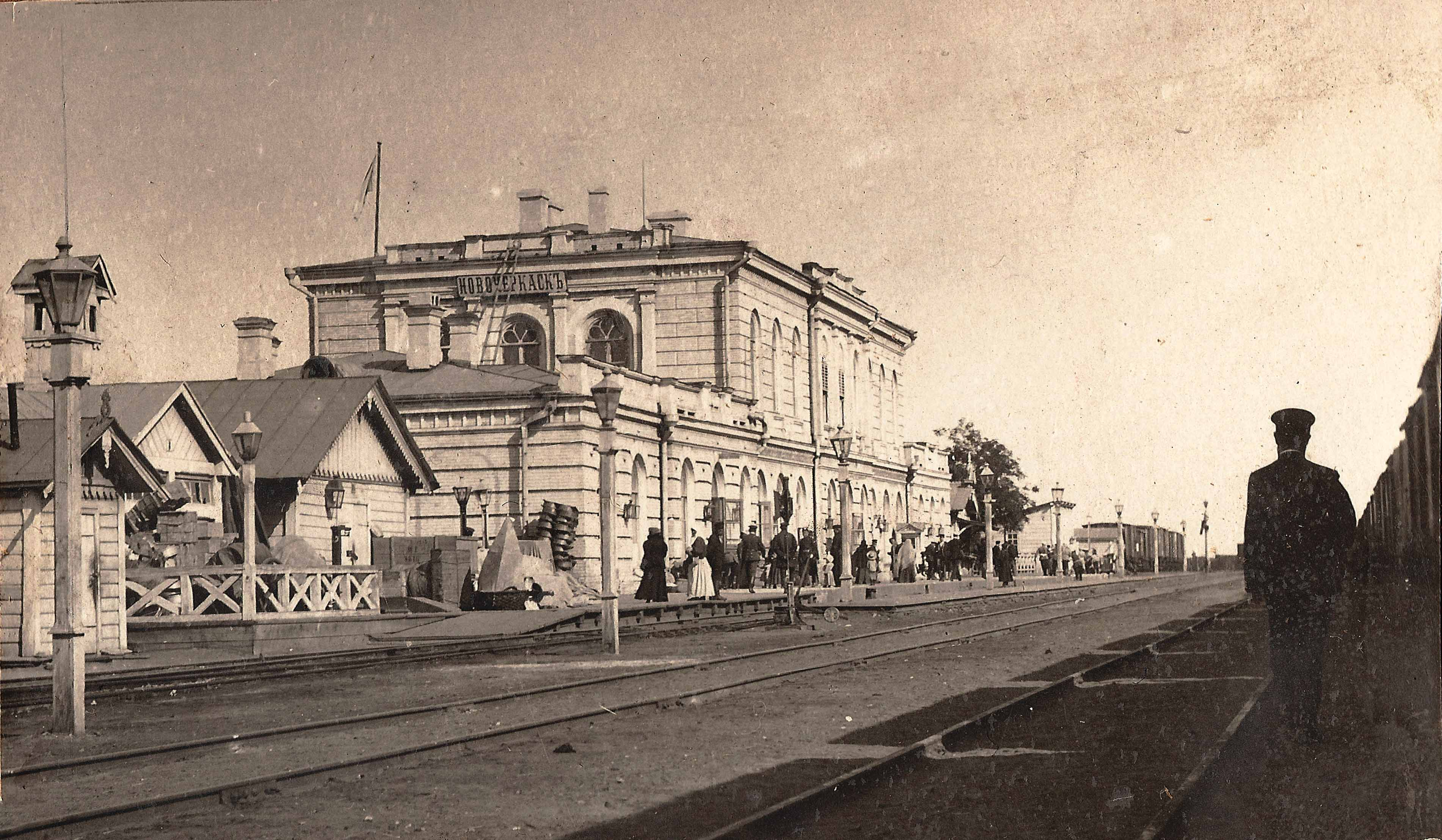
Novocherkassk railway station near 1905

Railway station in Novocherkassk was opened in 1863. The idea of building the railway from Aksay to Alexandro-Grushevskaya (Shakhty) via Novocherkassk was proposed by appointed ataman Mikheil Homutov. Homutov requested the Minister for War of Russian Empire to build this railway line. In his opinion, new railway should solve the problem of delivery of coal from deposits near Alexandro-Grushevskaya to barges on the river Don. This resolution was supported by the imperial decrees of 16 May 1860. Rolling stock, hydraulic cranes and steam engines were purchased in Belgium. The construction and operation of the Grushevsko-Don Railways was managed by a special committee headed by Count Valerian Panaev (engineer).

The works started in early April 1861. This decision resulted in mass protests by the Don Cossacks. A petition demanding cessation of the construction of railway gathered 364 signatures in Novocherkassk. Locals feared that the railway would prevent stripping of cattle, deprive tillage of water and inhibit urban development of Novocherkassk. However, the people's petition had no effect on the course of work.

The opening ceremony of the railway from Grushevskaya to Aksayskaya took place on 29 December 1863. The first regular train left Novocherkassk on 1 January 1864 in 14:15. Train with a number of passenger and freight wagons made trips every day except Sunday.

In 1870s the railway was extending to Moscow. Now Novocherkassk has busy railway connections to Central Russia and North Caucasus. The first station was built with wood. In its place was erected a two-story stone building in the near future. During Second World War station was destroyed. New building was built in early 1950s.

== Passenger railway communication ==
The immediate proximity to a junction stations ensures railway communication with all Russian regions. From Novocherkassk train services depart to major Russian cities such as: Moscow, Saint-Petersburg, Novosibirsk, Yekaterinburg, Chelyabinsk, Omsk, Nizhny Novgorod, Samara, Kazan, Rostov-on-Don, Voronezh, Sochi, Novorossiysk, Anapa, Vladikavkaz, Barnaul, Krasnoyarsk, Irkutsk.
