= Rostov-Glavny =

Railway station in Rostov-on-Don, Rostov, Russia

Rostov–Glavny Ростов–Главный
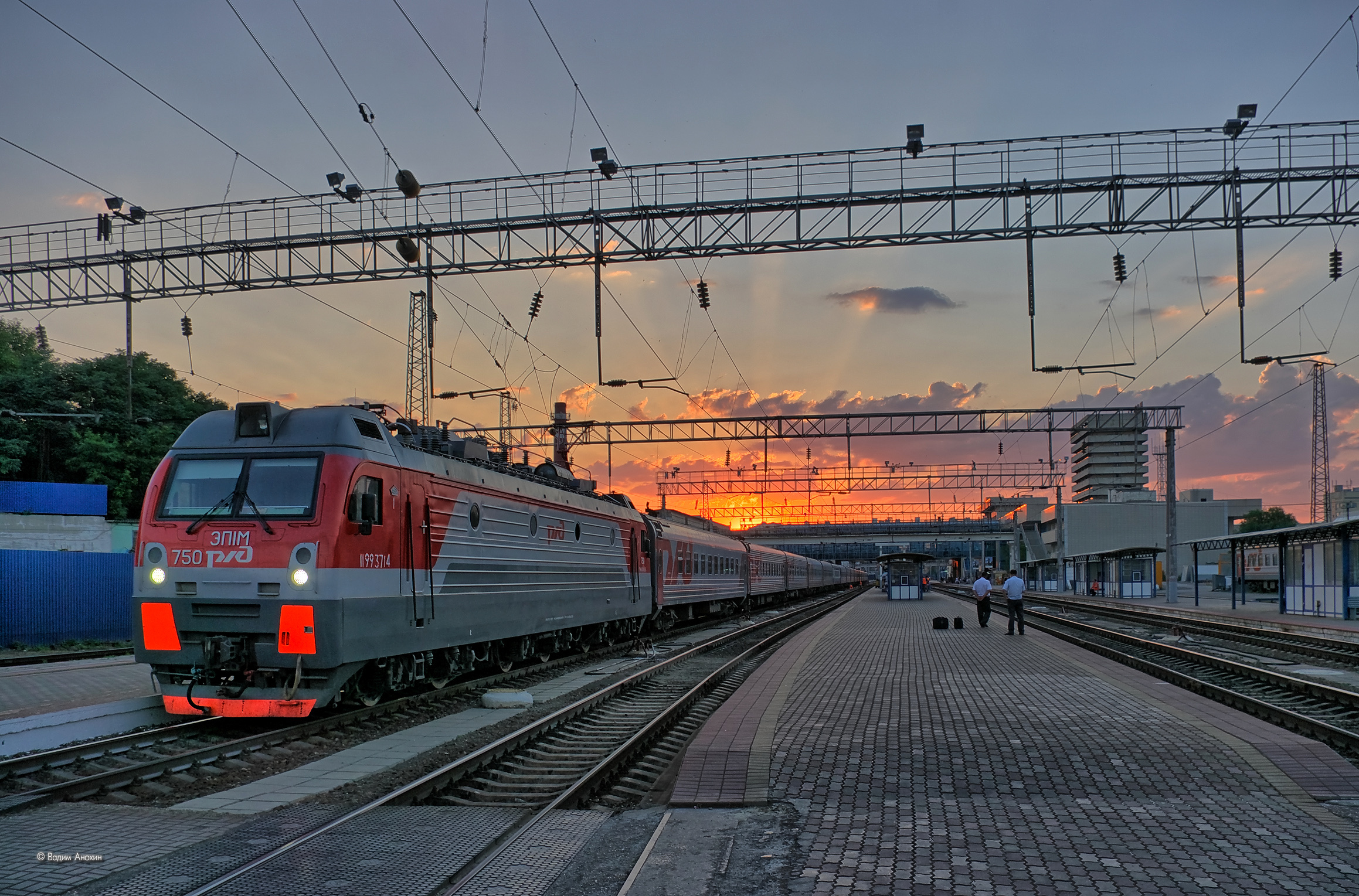
- Moscow–Adler train on platform 3.

General information
- Location: Russia, Rostov-on-Don
- Coordinates: 47°13′6.2″N 39°41′26.8″E
- System: North Caucasus Railway terminal
- Line: Moscow–Krasnodar main line
- Platforms: 6
- Tracks: 12

Construction
- Parking: yes

Other information
- Station code: 510204

History
- Opened: 1869
- Rebuilt: 2004

Passengers
- 2006: 1.5 mln
Location

Rostov–Glavny (Russian: Росто́в–Гла́вный) is the main railway station of Rostov-on-Don in Russia.

== Main information ==
Rostov station is one of the biggest stations on the North Caucasus Railway. The station also includes commuter rail station Rostov-Prigorodniy opened in 1962, and rebuilt in 2009.

== History ==
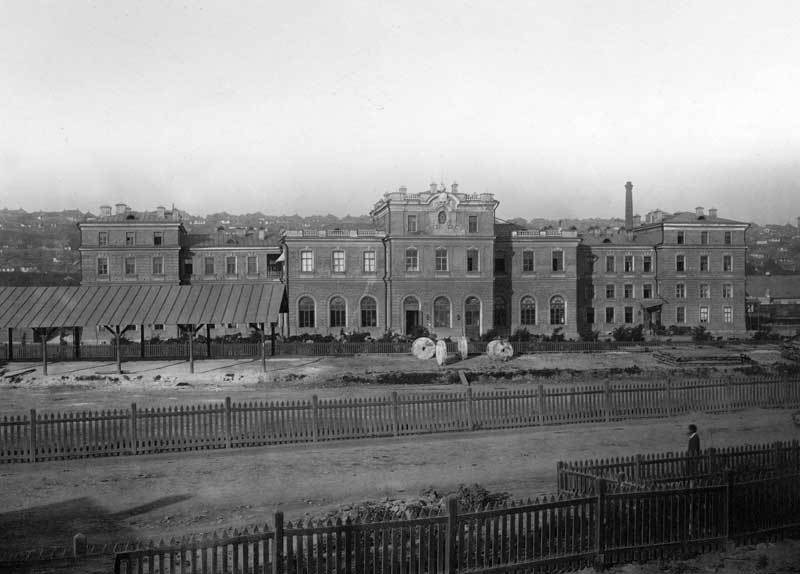
Rostov railway station in 1875

In 1869, Kursk–Kharkiv–Azov railways (now Southern Ukrainian Railways) reached Rostov-on-Don from the west. In 1876 another railways – Kozlov–Voronezh–Rostov – reached Rostov-on-Don from the north. At this time two stations on the bank of the river Don – Rostov and Nakhichevan-on-Don – were closed, and on Kozlov–Voronezh–Rostov railways was opened station Nakhichevan, that in the present is called "Rostov-Tovarniy".

In 1875, the construction of the three-storeyed building of the station Rostov–Vladikavkazskiy (Rostov–Glavniy) was completed. For that time, it was a modern station with good prospects for future growth. On January 15, 1876, Rostov–Glavniy was officially opened. The station building had been rebuilt many times. For example, during World War II in the autumn of 1941 the station building was destroyed by bombing and then restored.

By the end of the 1970s the building was pulled down for the construction of the new station with high-rise hotel towers. By the early 1990s the construction of a complex of additional buildings was over. And in 2000 the reconstruction of the main building began. It was completed in 2004.

In 2006 some long-distance trains were moved to the new station in the western part of the city – Rostov–Pervomayskiy.
