= Tustin (surname) =

Tustin is a surname derived from the Old Norse name Þórsteinn like Dustin, through a Latinized form Tustinus, itself a variant of Turstinus, which Latinizes the Old Norman name To[r]stein, Tu[r]stin (now surnames Tostain, Toustain, Toutain). This Old Norse name, like Thorsten, is composed of the elements Thor (Þorr) and stein (steinn) "stone" together.

Notable people with the surname include:

- Arnold Tustin (1899–1994), British engineer
- Frances Tustin (1913–1994), British psychotherapist
- George Tustin (1889–1968), Canadian politician
- Norman Tustin (19–1998), Canadian Ice Hockey player
- Septimus Tustin (1796–1871), American clergyman and Chaplain to the House of Representatives
