= Dustin Latimer =

American inline skater (born 1981)

Personal information
- Full name: Dustin Latimer
- Nickname: DL
- Born: May 9, 1981 (age 45) Salt Lake City, Utah, United States

Sport
- Country: United States
- Sport: Aggressive inline skating
- Event: Street
- Turned pro: 1997
- Retired: 2007
Medal record
Competitions
Representing United States
- Updated on 17 November 2014

Dustin Latimer (born May 9, 1981) is an American inline skater, born in Salt Lake City, Utah. He resides in Phoenix, Arizona.

== Skating career ==
Dustin started inline skating at the age of 9, using ramps built by his father. Dustin signed his first professional contract at age of 15 with Euro Funk clothing and Medium Wheels.

In 1997, he was signed to the Universal Skate Design (USD) pro team along with Jon Julio, Arlo Eisenberg, Champion Baumstimler, Kevin Gillian and Josh Petty. His first pro skate was released the same year. The USD (Classic) Throne I which featured his name were the first customizable skates. During his time at USD, Dustin had 6 pro skates released:

- USD Classic Throne I, Boot: dark green, Cuff: dark grey, Soulplate: black, 1997
- USD Classic Throne II, Boot: light grey, Cuff: dark grey, Soulplate: dark grey, 1999
- USD Psirus I, Boot: light and medium grey, Cuff: dark grey, Soulplate: white, 2000
- USD Psirus II, Boot: light brown and dark grey, Cuff: light brown, Soulplate: gold, 2001
- USD Throne UFS I, Boot: black, Cuff: dark grey, Soulplate: white and dark grey, 2002
- USD Throne UFS II, Boot: black, Cuff: dark brown, Soulplate: gold and dark brown, 2003

During this time Dustin was also riding for England Clothing which was started by his friend and USD teammate Jon Julio. Other notable England Clothing professional skaters were Jon Julio, Josh Petty, Rachard Johnson and Dominic Sagona.

In the year 2000, USD released the influential team video "Coup De Tat". This video edited by Javad "Joe" Navran featured the all USD Team: Brian Shima, Kevin Gillian, Josh Petty, Jeff Frederick, Champion Baumstimler, Jon Julio.

The same year (2000), Dustin and Shane Coburn launched the Mindgame wheel company. Mindgame rapidly gained notoriety in part to their premiere team video "Brain Fear Gone" which was edited by both Coburn and Latimer. This video featured Brian Shima, Jon Elliot, Omar Wysong, Dustin Latimer and introduced Aaron Feinberg. Dustin had a total of 7 pro wheels released under Mindgame:

- Edition I, 55mm/90A, Print: One eye logo, Mindgame logo and Dustin Latimer name scattered, 2000
- Edition II, XXmm/XXA, Print: Lines describing a shelter around bearing socket, mindkind logo with eye logo head on the right, and M logo at the bottom, 2001
- Edition III, 55mm/88A, Print: 4 quadrants, one with eye logo, one with DL letters, one with M logo, one with 55/88, 2002
- Edition IV, 55mm/90A, Print: DUSTIN LATIMER block letters, 2003
- Edition V, 54mm/92A, Print: One big eye logo around the bearing socket, 2004
- Edition VI, 54mm/92A, Print: Three rows of small eyes logos doing the circumference, 2005
- Edition VII, 54mm/92A, Print: One big eye logo around the bearing socket surrounded with small eyes logo with an enlighting eye logo at the top, 2006

In 2003, Dustin left USD to start the Xsjado skate brand (pronounced "Shadow"). Xsjado skates were developed by Latimer and Shane Coburn and produced by Salomon. The Xsjado concept eschewed the common shell and lacing system of inline-skate boots and relied on straps similar to that of a snowboard binding to encase the rider's shoe to a soleplate. Dustin had 2 pro skates released during his time with Xsjado:

- Xsjado Dustin Latimer 1, Boot: black and grey, Cuff: brown, Soulplate: black and brown, 2003
- Xsjado Dustin Latimer 2:, Boot: green and grey, Cuff: light grey, Soulplate: light grey, 2006

In 2008, Dustin was signed back on the USD All Star Team along with Kevin Gillian and Aaron Feinberg.

Dustin no longer skates for the USD Team nor for Xsjado Team,

== Film career ==
Dustin has appeared in several videos such as:

- Children of the Night, 1996
- Toys Beneath our Feet, 1997
- One Nation, 1997
- Film of the Year, 1997
- Elements, 1997
- Espionage, 1998
- F.O.R. (Future Of Rollerblading), 1998
- Medium Team, 1998
- Millennium, 1999
- Volume, 1999
- Elements II, 1999
- Coup de Tat, 2000
- Brain Fear Gone, 2000
- Words, 2003
- Bang, 2004
- Feet, 2005
- Accidental Machines, 2006

== Personal life ==
Dustin has a son and practices yoga, rock climbing and working on cars.
