= Kamenskaya railway station =

Railway station in Russia

Kamenskaya Каменская
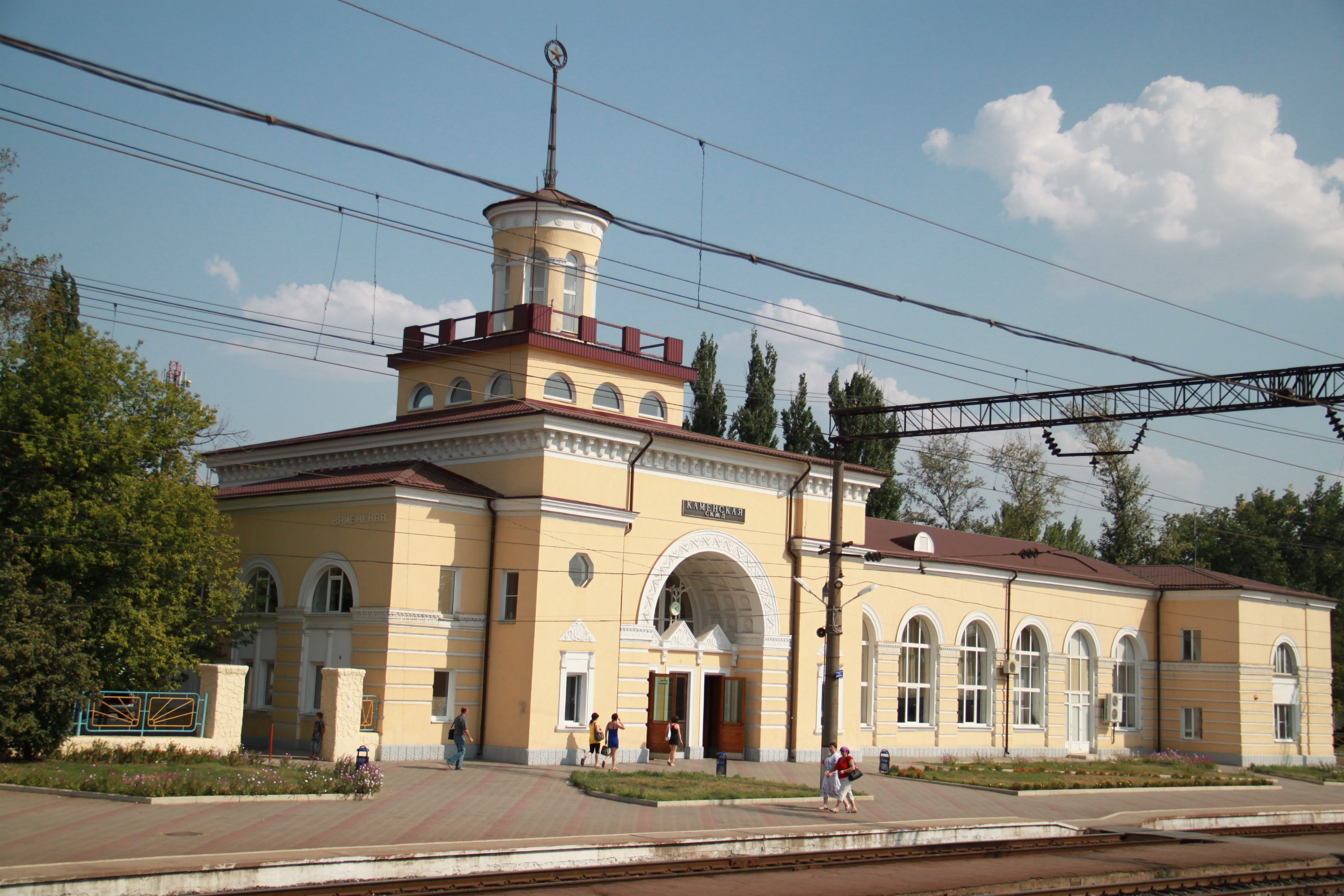
- View of the station from the platform

General information
- Location: 1, Privokzalnaya street, Kamensk-Shakhtinsky, Russia
- Coordinates: 48.328861°N 40.258722°E
- Platforms: 3
- Tracks: 8

Construction
- Parking: yes

Other information
- Station code: 587206

History
- Opened: 1871
- Rebuilt: 1951
Location

Kamenskaya railway station (Russian: станция Каменская) is a railway station located in Kamensk-Shakhtinsky, Rostov oblast, Russia. It is 188 km down-line from Rostov-Glavny and is situated between Likhaya and Pogorelovo on the Moscow — Rostov-on-Don line. The station is approximately 1 km from the town center and 5 km from the central bus station. Kamenskaya is served by Russian railways.

== History ==
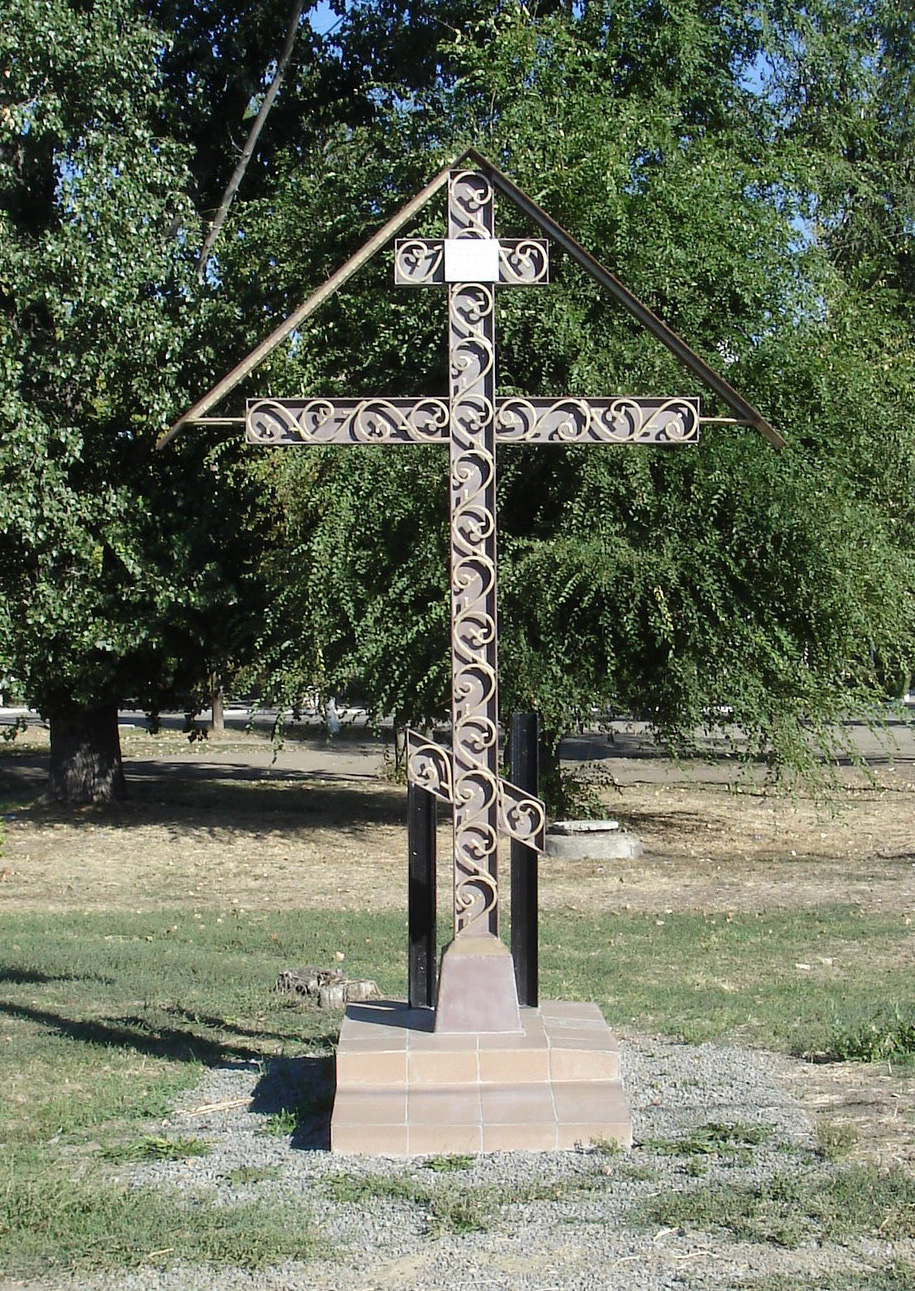
Memorial cross for the victims of the Kamensk-Shakhtinsky rail disaster

With the railway passing through the stanitsa in 1871, the station was built. Opening of the railway triggered the economic growth, improving the quality of life. This advantageous location of Kamenskaya (now Kamensk-Shakhtinsky) on the Moscow — Voronezh — Kozlov (now Michurinsk) — Rostov-on-Don railway made it possible to develop trade. Drovers, merchants, businessmen, salespeople begun to work in Kamenskaya thanks to convenient and reliable transport links. The stanitsa has become not only a market but also a production center. For example, one of the first grain elevators in the Don Host Oblast was opened near the railway station. Two mills, churn, Shmidt ironworks, soap and alcohol factories, brewery, meat-packing plant, farm equipment workshop were working here. The railway became the most appropriate mode of transport for delivering raw materials to the local plants. Also the service sector had evolved. Shops, banks, hotel were opened in Kamenskaya. Bagmen came to the stanitsa from Moscow, Saint Petersburg, Warsaw, Łódź. The enhanced status of Kamenskaya impacted its appearance. Main streets were paved, water pipe was put into operation.

The second station building was built in 1912. It was destroyed in 1942 during the Great Patriotic War. Current station building was built in 1951 according to standard design of Kharkiv architectural office.

Kamenskaya railway station was the scene of the Kamensk-Shakhtinsky rail disaster, one of the worst accidents on the Soviet railways. The disaster took place on 7 August 1987, while a freight train consisting of 55 wagons with a VL80^{с}−887/842 electric locomotive from Likhaya crashed into a stopped passenger train at the station. Amongst the passengers and crew of the passenger train, 104 passengers and 2 porters were killed, the locomotive crew of the freight train survived. The cause of the disaster was brake failure on the freight train.

== Description ==
Today's infrastructure of the station consists of the station building, two low-lying through passenger platforms and one cargo platform, walking bridge over south yard neck. Station layout consists of 8 tracks including 2 stub ended tracks (the first six tracks are electrified 25 kV AC system).

== Services ==
Kamenskaya is the central Kamensk-Shakhtinsky terminus for long-distance and suburban trains operated by Russian Railways. The most common destinations are: Rostov-on-Don, Moscow, Adler, Novorossiysk, Anapa, Kislovodsk, Saint Petersburg, Stavropol, Makhachkala, Sukhumi, Vladikavkaz. The average stopping times of passenger trains are of about 2 minutes. The station host suburban trains from Rostov-on-Don, Glubokaya and Chertkovo.
