= Monument to railwaymen (Kamensk-Shakhtinsky) =

- Russian: Памятник железнодорожникам
- Interactive map of Monument to railwaymen
- Location: Park of railwaymen in Kamensk-Shakhtinsky, Rostov Oblast, Russia
- Coordinates: 48°09′04″N 40°10′58″E
- Type: Monument
- Material: Metal, concrete
- Opening date: 1986
- Location in Russia

Monument to railwaymen (Russian: Памятник железнодорожникам) or Monument to a steam locomotive (Russian: Памятник паровозу) is a monument in Kamensk-Shakhtinsky, Rostov Oblast, Russia. It is dedicated to the railwaymen of Likhaya Railway Division, who were working hard during and following the Great Patriotic War. It consists of an intact steam locomotive class L on the railway track installed on the low concrete pedestal. The monument is surrounded by an iron chain. The opening ceremony took place on 2 August 1986. The monument was officially opened by railway veterans P. Berkov, A. Odininsky, N. Yurov. In front of the locomotive there is a slab with carved words:

In honor of selfless work of the railwaymen of Likhaya Railway Division in the South Eastern Railway during and following the Great Patriotic War from grateful natives of Likhovskoy.

Resolution of the Executive Committee Council of National Deputies of December 12, 1992 No. 325 the monument is considered to be an object of local cultural heritage. The steam locomotive is located in the center of Likhovskoy (a district of Kamensk-Shakhtinsky) near a Community Center of railwaymen.

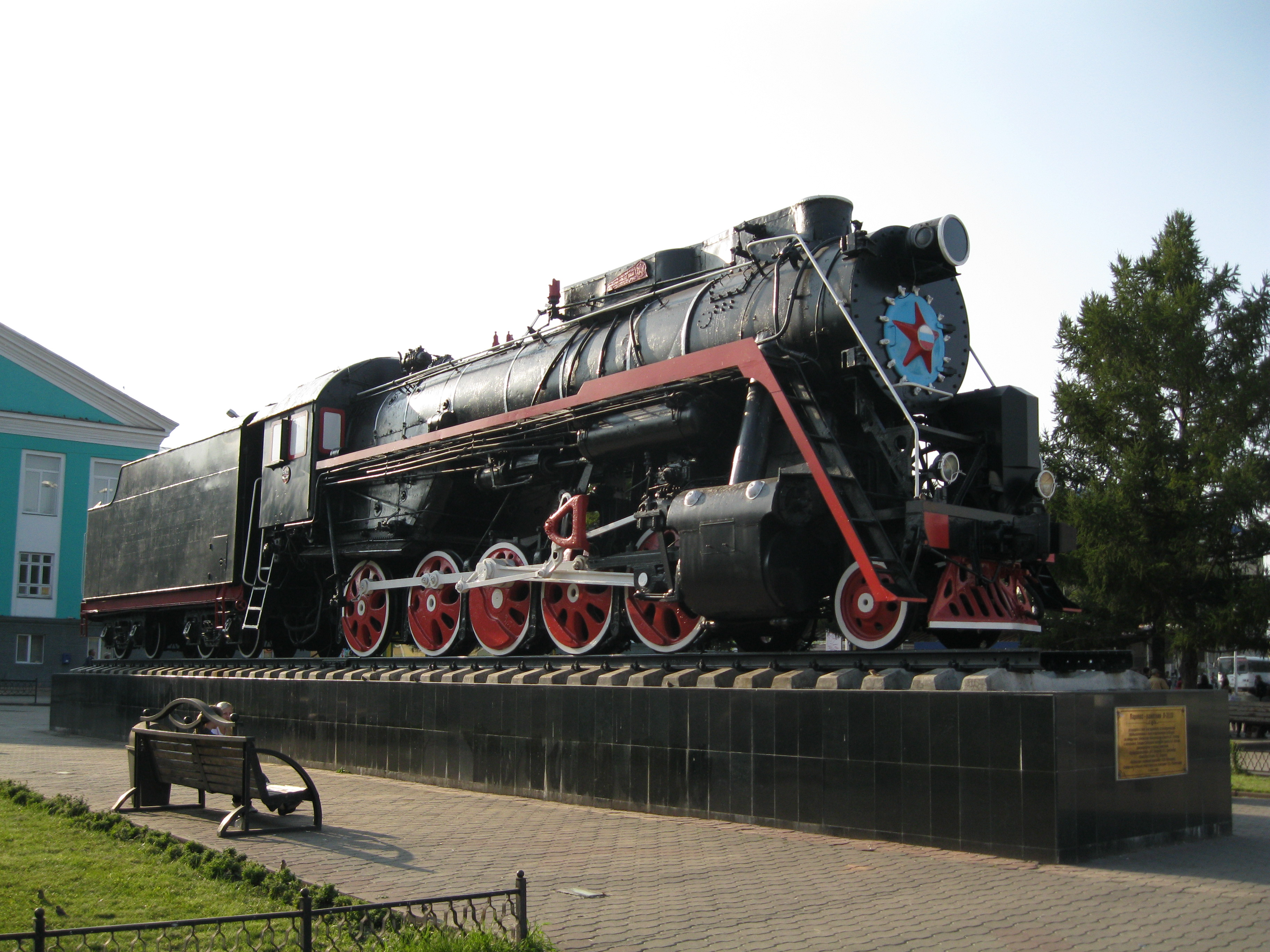
The same steam locomotive as a monument in Kemerovo

The steam locomotive L-0002 was built at the Kolomna Locomotive Works in 1945. It registered Kochetkovka-I as its home locomotive depot. The locomotive was in service on the Morozovskaya — Likhaya railway and other lines running from Southwest and South Russia between 1947 and the 1970s.
