= Thurston (name) =

- Gender: Male

Origin
- Origin: Old Norse; or Old Norse and Old English
- Meaning: Thor's stone; or Thurston, Suffolk

Other names
- Related names: Dustin, Thorstein, Thorsten, Thurstan, Torstein, Torsten

Thouston (/ˈθɜːrstən/) is an English-language name. The name has several origins. In some cases it can have originated from the Old Norse personal name Þórsteinn. This name is derived from the Old Norse elements Þórr ("Thor", the Scandinavian thunder god) and steinn ("stone", "rock"). In other cases the name can have originated from the name of Thurston, located in Suffolk, England. This place name is derived from the Old Norse personal name Þóri and the Old English element tūn ("enclosure", "settlement").

== Surname ==
=== People ===
- Asa Thurston (1787–1868), American missionary in Hawaii
- Baratunde Thurston (born 1977), American comedian
- Colin Thurston (1947–2007), English recording engineer and producer
- Darren Thurston (born c. 1970), Canadian animal rights activist
- David Thurston (1918–2013), American aircraft designer
- David Thurston (born 1955), British Anti-Cancer Drug Design Professor
- Deborah Thurston, American engineer
- E. Temple Thurston (1879–1933), British poet, playwright and author
- Fred Thurston (1933–2014), American football player
- Harry Thurston (born 1950), Canadian writer and journalist
- Howard Thurston (1869–1936), American magician
- Jennifer L. Thurston (born 1967), American judge
- John Thurston (basketball) (born 1948), American college basketball coach
- John Thurston (inventor) (1777–1850), dubbed "the father of the billiards trade"
- John Thurston (politician) (born 1972), American politician from Arkansas
- Johnathan Thurston (born 1983), Australian rugby league footballer
- John Mellen Thurston (1847–1916), American politician
- John Bates Thurston (1836–1897), British governor of Fiji
- Katherine Thurston (1875–1911), Irish author
- Laura M. Hawley Thurston (1812–1842), American poet, educator
- Lorrin A. Thurston (1857–1931), American lawyer and leader of the 1893 Hawaiian revolution
- Lucy Goodale Thurston (1795–1876), Hawaiian missionary and author, wife of Asa Thurston
- Richard Thurston (born 1973), American musician
- Robert Thurston (novelist) (1936–2021), American science fiction writer
- Robert Henry Thurston (1839–1903), American engineer
- Sally Thurston, American statistician
- Samuel Thurston (1815–1851), American politician
- Scott Thurston (born 1952), American musician
- Sloppy Thurston (1899-1973), American professional baseball pitcher
- William Thurston (1946–2012), American mathematician

=== Fictional characters ===
- Renton Thurston, protagonist of the manga series Eureka Seven
- Sid "The Snitch" Thurston, character in the American TV series Hill Street Blues and its spin-off, Beverly Hills Buntz
- Francis Wayland Thurston, narrator of the short story The Call of Cthulhu (1926) by H. P. Lovecraft
- King Thurston in the medieval Middle English romance King Horn

== Given name ==
=== People ===
- Thurston Clarke (born 1946), American historian, author and journalist
- Thurston Daniels (1859–1926), Populist politician from the U.S. state of Washington
- Thurston Dart (1921–71), British musicologist, conductor, and keyboard player
- Thurston Hall (1882–1958), American film actor
- Thurston Harris (1931–90), American singer
- Thurston Howe (born 1983), lead guitarist of the heavy metal band Flayed Disciple
- Thurston Hunt (executed 1601), English Roman Catholic priest
- Thurston Moore (born 1958), American musician in the rock band Sonic Youth
- Thurston Rostron (1863–91), English footballer
- Thurston Twigg-Smith (1921–2016), businessman and philanthropist from Hawaii

=== Fictional characters ===
- Thurston Howell III, one of the seven castaways, credited as "The Millionaire" in the 1960s sitcom Gilligan's Island
- Thurston "Cupcake", a fictional cat character in the Nickelodeon animated series, Hey Arnold!

== See also ==
- Thurston (disambiguation)
- Thorstein
- Thurstan
- Louis Leon Thurstone (1887–1955), American pioneer in psychometrics and psychophysics
