= Kamensk-Shakhtinsky rail disaster =

1987 railway incident in the Soviet Union

Coordinates: 48°19′55″N 40°15′30″E

Details
- Date: August 7, 1987; 01:30
- Location: Kamensk-Shakhtinsky
- Country: USSR
- Line: North Caucasus Railway
- Operator: Russian Railways
- Incident type: Rear collision
- Cause: Brake failure

Statistics
- Trains: 2
- Deaths: 106 (on train); 1 (indirect, electrocution); Total: 107
- Injured: 114

The Kamensk-Shakhtinsky rail disaster occurred on August 7, 1987, at 01:30 in Kamenskaya station in the town of Kamensk-Shakhtinsky on the North Caucasus Railway in the Soviet Union when a freight train ran into the rear of a passenger train standing in the station, killing 106.

A freight train from Bataisk (a port on the Don River) consisting of 55 wagons loaded with Kuban grain, hauled by a pair of VL80-C three section electric locomotives and weighing 5500 tons arrived at Likhaya station where a leakage of air between the 6th and 7th wagons was noticed. The train crew closed the brake line after the 6th wagon, thereby isolating the brakes of the rearmost 49 wagons, meaning that they were not being replenished with air from the locomotives. The locomotive crews were then changed without the new crew being informed of the leak and brake isolation. Complying with the regulations the new crew performed a brake test, the driver noticed the brake had to be applied harder than usual but the driver incorrectly assumed all was in order, and at 00:55 the heavy train began the long descent to Kamensk-Shakhtinsky. As the train accelerated the driver applied the service brake to keep the speed of the train down to 65 km/h but the train continued to accelerate; the emergency braking proved ineffectual. A warning was sent by radio to Kamenskaya station where a number of trains were standing (many carrying dangerous chemicals).

Ahead of the runaway freight train the 10 carriage Rostov-on-Don — Moscow passenger train was due to stop at Kamenskaya station. The officer on duty at the station attempted to radio the driver to tell him not to stop but was unable to make contact and at 01:28 as it stopped at the station the driver was immediately ordered to continue. Unfortunately the conductor of the train aware that passengers had not yet alighted, pulled the emergency brake (as demanded by his job description).

At 01:30 the freight train entered the station travelling at 140 km/h and collided with the rear of the passenger train, destroying three carriages and killing 106 people and injuring 114 (including the locomotive crew of the freight train, and Soviet actress Tatiana Livanova with her daughter). During the repair works, an electrician touched a live contact wire and died, becoming the 107th victim of the disaster.

The two mechanics who last checked the brakes on the freight train were each sentenced to 12 years in prison.
