= Thurston =

Thurston may refer to:

== Places ==
=== Antarctica ===
- Thurston Glacier, Marie Byrd Land
- Thurston Island, off Ellsworth Land

=== United Kingdom ===
- Thurston, Suffolk, England, a village and parish
  - Thurston railway station

=== United States ===
- Thurston County, Nebraska
  - Thurston, Nebraska, a village
- Thurston, New York, a town
- Thurston, Ohio, a village
- Thurston, Oregon (disambiguation), several places
- Thurston County, Washington
- Thurston Creek, Washington
- Thurston Lake, California, United States

== People and fictional characters ==
- Thurston (name), a list of people and fictional characters with the given name or surname

== Schools ==
- Thurston Community College, a co-educational secondary school and sixth form in Thurston, Suffolk, England
- Thurston High School, Springfield, Oregon, United States
- Lee M. Thurston High School, Redford, Michigan, United States
- Thurston Elementary School, Ann Arbor, Michigan

== Other uses ==
- Thurston Gardens, botanical gardens in Suva, Fiji
- Thurston House (disambiguation), several houses on the US National Register of Historic Places
- Thurston's Hall, a former snooker and billiards venue in London
- USS Thurston, a World War II troop transport

== See also ==
- Thurston End, a hamlet near Hawkedon in Suffolk, England
- Thurstone
- Thurstaston
- Thurstan
