= Dustin (name) =

- Gender: Male
- Language: English

Origin
- Origin: Old Norse
- Meaning: Thor's stone

Other names
- Related names: Thorstein, Thorsten, Thurstan, Thurston, Torstein, Torsten

Dustin is a surname and masculine given name.

== Etymology ==
Dustin originates from an English surname, which is derived from the Norman personal name Tustin, variant form of Turstin, Torstein, which is in turn derived from the Old Norse Þorsteinn (Torsten). This Old Norse name is composed of elements meaning Þor (the god Thor) and steinn "stone".

== Given name ==
- Dustin Ackley (born 1988), American former baseball player
- Dustin Antolin (born 1989), American baseball pitcher
- Dustin Berg (born 1983), American criminal
- Dustin Bomheuer (born 1991), German football player
- Dustin Boyd (born 1986), Canadian ice hockey player
- Dustin Brown (ice hockey) (born 1984), American ice hockey player
- Dustin Brown (tennis) (born 1984), Jamaican-German tennis player
- Dustin Breeding (born 1987), member of the R&B group B5
- Dustin Burleson (born 1979), American orthodontist and consultant
- Dustin Byfuglien (born 1985), American ice hockey player
- Dustin Cherniawski (born 1981), Canadian football player
- Dustin Colquitt (born 1982), American football player
- Dustin Crum (born 1999), American football player
- Dustin Demri-Burns (born 1978), English actor, comedian and writer
- Dustin Diamond (1977–2021), American actor
- Dustin Dodge, American politician
- Dustin Fletcher (born 1975), Australian rules footballer
- Dustin Gee (1942–1986), British comedian
- Dustin Hermanson (born 1972), American baseball player
- Dustin Hersee (born 1975), Canadian backstroke swimmer
- Dustin Higgs (1972–2021), American convicted murderer
- Dustin Hoffman (born 1937), American actor
- Dustin Honken (1968–2020), American convicted murderer
- Dustin Hopkins (born 1990), American football placekicker
- Dustin Howard (born 1986), American professional wrestler, known by his ring name Chuck Taylor
- Dustin Johnson (born 1984), American professional golfer
- Dustin Kensrue (born 1980), American musician
- Dustin Latimer (born 1981), American inline skater
- Dustin Lyman (born 1976), American football player
- Dustin Lynch (born 1985), American country singer and songwriter
- Dustin Martin (born 1991), Australian rules footballer
- Dustin May (born 1997), American baseball pitcher
- Dustin Milligan (born 1985), Canadian film and television actor
- Dustin Moskovitz (born 1984), co-founder of Facebook
- Dustin Nguyen (born 1962), Vietnamese-American actor, director, writer, martial artist
- Dustin Nickerson (born 1984), American stand-up comedian
- Dustin Nippert (born 1981), American baseball player
- Dustin Pedroia (born 1983), American baseball player
- Dustin Poirier (born 1989), American mixed martial artist
- Dustin Rhodes, (born 1969; real name Dustin Runnels), American professional wrestler
- Dustin Tokarski (born 1989), Canadian ice hockey goaltender
- Dustin Vaughan (born 1991), American football player
- Dustin Woodard (born 1998), American football player

== Surname ==
- Bill Dustin (1909–2001), New Zealand cricketer
- Frederic H. Dustin (1930–-2018), American philanthropist
- Hannah Duston (1657–1736, 1737 or 1738), also spelled Dustin, American Puritan woman who was captured by and escaped from a Abenaki raiding party from Quebec

== Fictional characters ==
- Dustin Henderson, a character in the Netflix series Stranger Things
- Dustin Brooks, a character in the television series Zoey 101
- Dustin the Big Hopper from Starlight Express
- Dustin the Turkey, an Irish television puppet
- Dustin Brooks (Power Rangers Ninja Storm), the yellow Wind Ranger portrayed by Glen McMillan
- Dustin, a character from the horror comic series Witch Creek Road

== See also ==
- Dustin-Leigh Konzelman, reality-television participant or contestant and beauty queen pageant
- Dustin (disambiguation)
- Torsten
