= Dustin Berg =

Former recipient of the Purple Heart medal

- Born: February 19, 1983 (age 43); United States
- Status: Released
- Convictions: Negligent homicide Making official false statements (2 counts); Self injury without intent to avoid service
- Penalty: 18 months imprisonment

Dustin Berg (born February 19, 1983) is a former member of the Indiana National Guard. In July 2005, he pleaded guilty to fatally shooting Hussein Kamel Hadi Dawood al-Zubeidi, who had been his partner during the U.S. occupation of Iraq. He was sentenced to serve 18 months.

Berg's original claim of self-defense was initially believed, and he was awarded a Purple Heart for the event that later earned him detention, demotion and a Bad Conduct Discharge.

== Investigation ==
Berg initially told investigators that he had been shot by the Iraqi police officer and then returned fire, killing him. Capt. Dan Stigall, who prosecuted the case, said Berg stuck with that story until 2004, when he admitted killing the Iraqi policeman.

Berg later claimed that, while on patrol with his Iraqi partner, he had a sudden premonition that his partner represented a danger to him. So he shot him three times, killing him.

Berg then shot himself in the stomach with his dead partner's weapon, so that he could claim he fired in self-defense. Berg's self-inflicted gunshot wound caused a relatively minor injury.

After Berg admitted shooting himself, his Purple Heart was later revoked.

== Court martial ==
Berg's court martial convened on July 25, 2005. On July 26, 2005, Berg pleaded guilty to negligent homicide, making false official statements, and self-injury in a hostile-fire zone.

Berg was defended by Charles Gittins, an officer in the United States Marine Corps Reserve who defends American servicemen in his civilian practice.

During his guilty plea, Berg noted, "I feel great remorse. As a result of my ignorance, the Iraqi police officer left behind a 2-year-old daughter and a wife. I went to Iraq to make a better life for everyone else. By also shooting myself, I took away all the good I tried to do."

He received a six-year sentence and a Bad Conduct Discharge from the U.S. Army. A plea agreement allowed him to be released after eighteen months.

== Reaction ==
In June 2006 the Associated Press distributed an article on pressure within the US military justice system to impose stiffer sentences on soldiers who kill outside of the context of battle—including re-introducing capital punishment. The article listed twenty past or pending cases, including Berg's, that contributed to the pressure to resuming seeking death sentences.

In March 2008, when Berg's unit returned to Iraq, the Indianapolis Star noted Berg's conviction, in the context of new, tighter, rules of engagement intended to prevent GIs killing Iraqis who weren't enemies. The paper quoted instructions the new commander of Berg's old battalion, Lieutenant Colonel Rodney Fogg, issued to the men in Berg's old battalion:

"You still have the right to self-defense. But you need to have your mind open to a different way of operating. Treat Iraqis with dignity. This is how we win -- and how we can go home."

In 2012 Alan F. Williams, a professor of law at Idaho University, wrote an article in which he claimed that the Berg case was questionably handled.
