= Glubokaya railway station =

Railway station in Gluboky, Russia

Glubokaya Глубокая
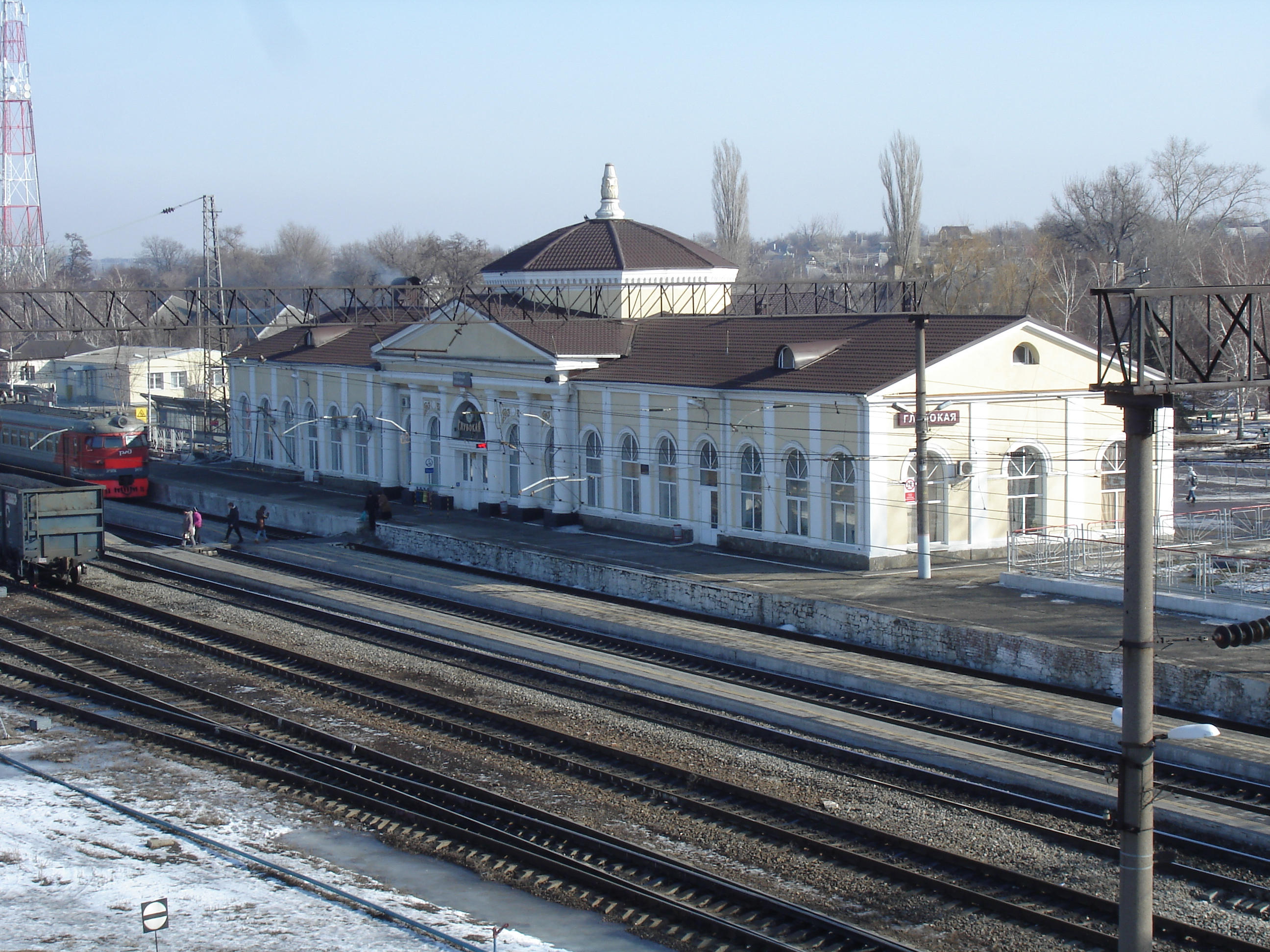
- View of the station

General information
- Location: Stantsionnaya Street, Glubokiy, Kamensky District, Rostov oblast Russia
- Coordinates: 48.5244°N 40.3234°E
- Platforms: 3
- Tracks: 7

Construction
- Parking: yes

Other information
- Station code: 587009

History
- Opened: 1870s
Location

Glubokaya railway station (Russian: станция Глубокая) is a railway station located in Glubokiy, Kamensky District, Rostov oblast, Russia. It is 23 km down-line from Kamenskaya and is situated between Tarasovka and Pogorelovo on the Moscow — Rostov-on-Don line. It is approximately 3.5 km from the Federal Automobile Road M-4 "Don".

== History ==
The wooden station building was originally built in 1870s for the Moscow — Rostov-on-Don Railway, completed in 1876. In the early 1900s the station had a locomotive depot for 4 steam locomotives and water crane. Village of Glubokiy was founded due to construction of this railway. Warehouses, mills and a market begun to work near the station. Suburban train to Kamenskaya was initiated in 1913. Glubokaya was an important railway terminal for Southern Russia in the early 20th century.

The fighting between the white Movement and Bolsheviks took place around the station during the Russian Civil War. It was occupied in 1942 during the Great Patriotic War. Village of Glubokiy and the self-named station were liberated by the Red Army on 15 January 1943. 57 steam locomotives, more than 100 carriages, grain elevator, five warehouses were taken by the Soviet Union at Glubokaya station.

== Services ==
Glubokaya is the terminal for suburban trains operated by North Caucasian Suburban Passenger Company. The station host suburban trains from Rostov-on-Don, Likhaya and Chertkovo. Long-distance trains proceed in state through the station without stop.

== Gallery ==
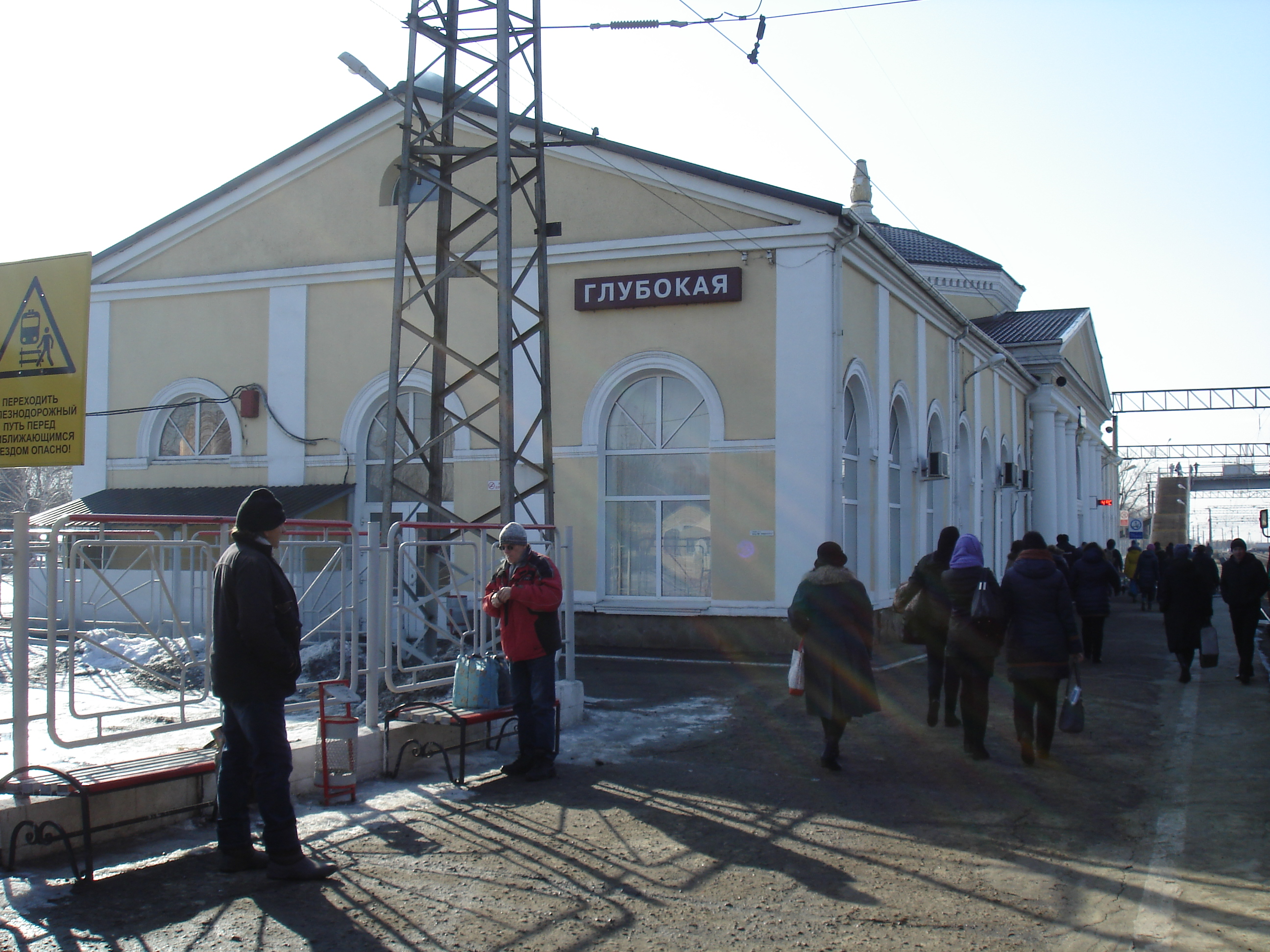

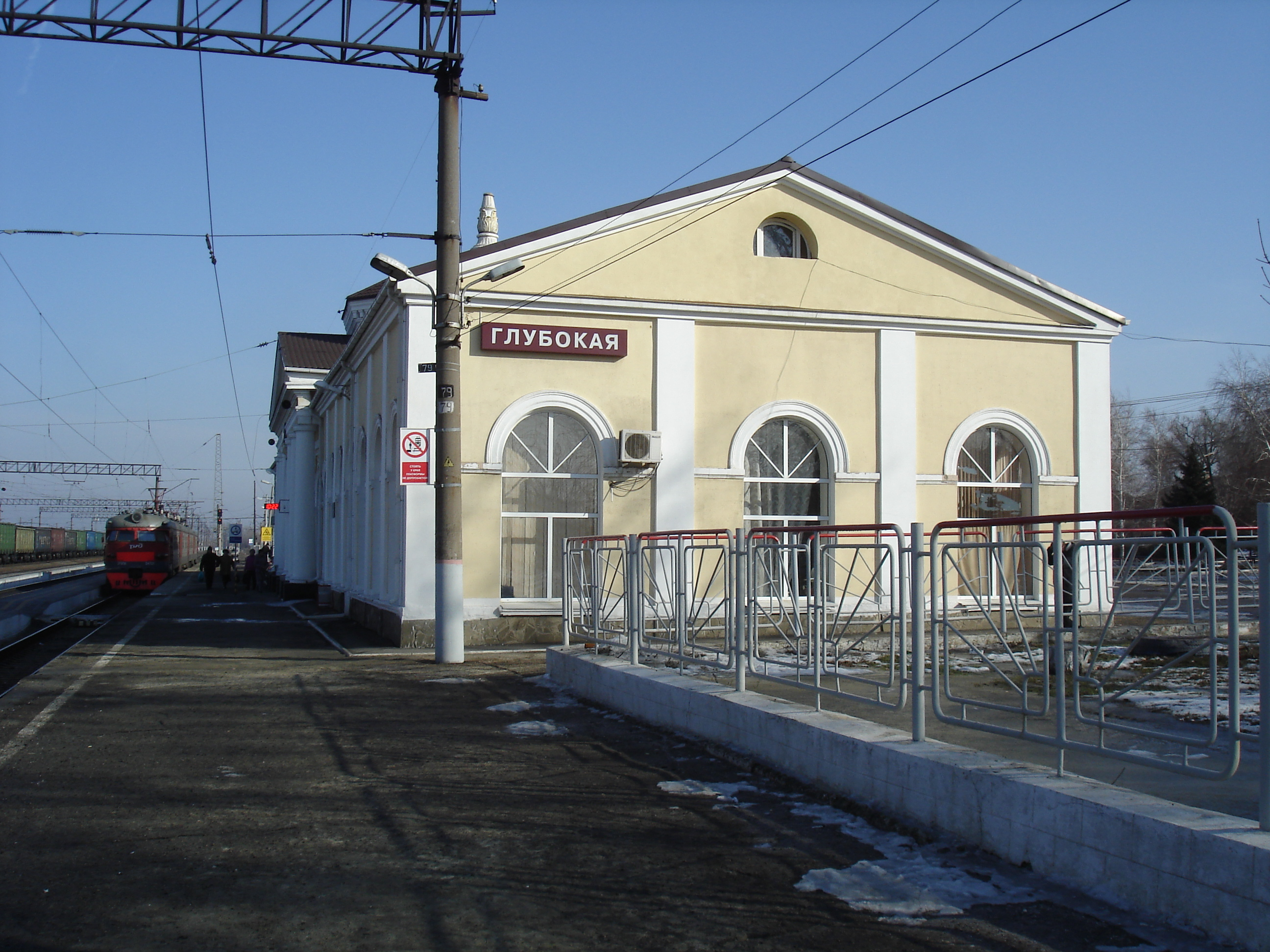

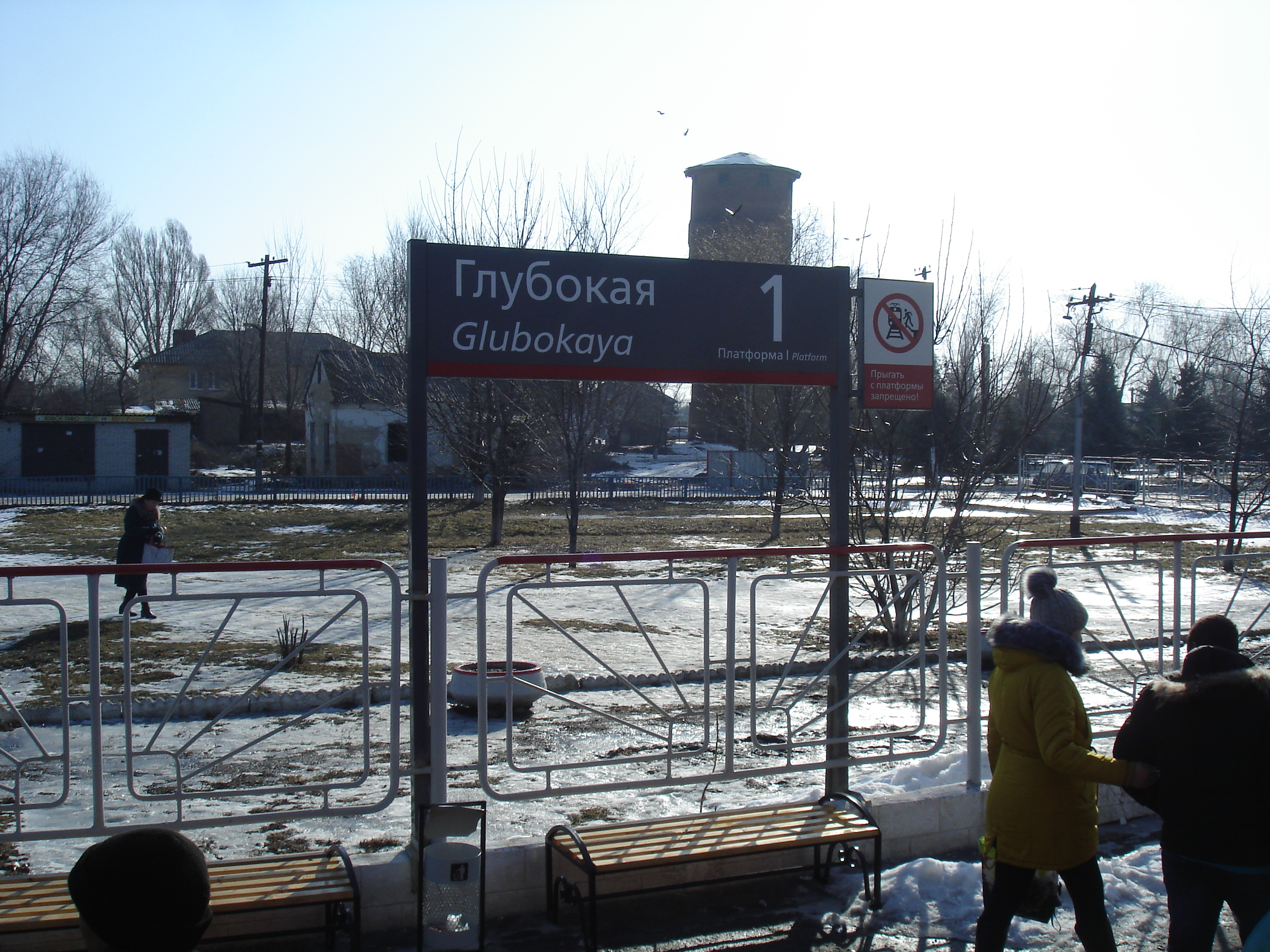
Nameplate
