= Turstin =

Turstin is a surname that appears in the Domesday Survey of 1086. Notable people with the name include:

- Turstin FitzRolf
- Turstin, Count of Avranchin (Note: Alfred Ellis in his 1879 article Landholders of Gloucestershire in the Domesday Book suggests the existence of yet another prominent Toustain FitzRou from the family of the Viscounts of the Avranchin, even further south from Le Havre than Le Bec Hellouin mentioned above. This person he states to have witnessed a charter of William FitzOsbern, Earl of Hereford, to Lyre Abbey, (printed in Gallia, Chr. XI, Instr., p.123). His reasoning is that Wace referred to Turstin the standard-bearer as "Le Blanc", i.e. "white-haired", apparently in order to differentiate him from another Turstin FitzRolf, who presumably had darker hair. Richard, Vicomte of the Avranchin, was the son of Turstin Goz and the father of Hugh d'Avranches, 1st Earl of Chester)
- Turstin, the Fleming of Wigmore
- Turstin, the Sheriff, who held 27 manors in Cornall. (Note: Turstin, the Sheriff, is recorded in Domesday as holding 27 manors in Cornwall from Robert, Count of Mortain, 1st Earl of Cornwall. He was described consistently as “Turstin the Sheriff”. In none of these Cornwall entries is he described as “FitzRolf” or variants thereof.)
- Turstin de Crispin de Bec Crispin (Note: The family of Crispin was wrongly associated with Bec Abbey at Le Bec Hellouin in the Roumois, but more probably with Bec-de-Mortagne in the Pays de Caux, near Fécamp and its name is included in the hamlet Le Bec-Crespin, at Saint-Martin-du-Bec near Le Havre, pays de Caux. Bec and -bec are widespread place-name elements in Normandy, meaning "stream, brook" from Old Norse bekk, accusative of bekkr. The name Turstin was common in this family and more generally in medieval Normandy, and for this reason it seems that Stacey Grimaldi, writing in 1832, confused some of the Turstins of Domesday as the same person.)

== See also ==
- Dustin
- Thorstein
- Torsten
- Toutain
- Tustin
