= Thorsten =

- Gender: Male

Origin
- Region of origin: Scandinavia

Other names
- Alternative spelling: Thorstein, Torstein, Torsten

Thorsten (Thorstein, Torstein, Torsten) is a Scandinavian given name. The Old Norse name was Þórsteinn. It is a compound of the theonym Þór (Thor) and steinn "stone", which became Thor and sten in Old Danish and Old Swedish.

The name is one of a group of Old Norse names containing the theonym Thor, besides other such as Þórarin, Þórhall, Þórkell, Þórfinnr, Þórvald, Þórvarðr, Þórolf, most of which, however, do not survive as modern names given with any frequency.

The name is attested in medieval Iceland, e.g. Þorsteinn rauður Ólafsson (c. 850 – 880), Þórsteinn Eiríksson (late 10th century), and in literature such as Draumr Þorsteins Síðu-Hallssonar.

The Old English equivalent of the Scandinavian and Norman name is Thurstan, attested after the Norman conquest of England in the 11th century as the name of a medieval archbishop of York (died 1140), of an abbot of Pershore (1080s) and of an abbot of Glastonbury (1090s). The English surname Thurston is presumably derived from this given name. The English given name Dustin is derived from a surname which in origin has been derived in turn from the Norman name Tustin, variant form of Turstin, Tostain, Toutain, etc. themselves from Old Norse given name Þorsteinn.

As a modern given name, Thorsten and Torsten also see some popularity in the English-speaking world and in German-speaking Europe.

People with this name include:

== Arts and entertainment ==
- Torstein Aagaard-Nilsen (born 1964), Norwegian composer
- Torsten Amft (born 1971), German fashion designer
- Torstein Flakne (born 1960), the founder of the Norwegian band Stage Dolls
- Thorsten Flinck (born 1961), Swedish musician
- Thorsten Owusu Gyimah (born 2003), Ghanaian drill rapper known as Yaw Tog
- Thorsten Kaye (born 1966), American-based actor
- Torstein Lofthus (born 1977), Norwegian drummer
- Thorsten Quaeschning, German musician of the band Tangerine Dream
- Torsten Wasastjerna (1863–1924), Finnish artist

== Politics ==
- Torsten Bell (born 1982), British politician
- Torstein Børte (1899–1985), Norwegian politician
- Torsten Brandel (1912–1989), Swedish diplomat
- Torsten Burmester (born 1963), German politician
- Torstein Dahle (born 1947), Norwegian politician and economist
- Torsten Elofsson (born 1950), Swedish politician
- Thorsten Faas (born 1975), German political scientist
- Thorsten Guttormsen Fretheim (1808–1874), Norwegian politician
- Thorstein John Ohnstad Fretheim (1886–1971), Norwegian politician
- Torsten Gejl (born 1964), Danish politician
- Torsten Lindström (born 1974), Swedish politician
- Torsten Nothin (1884–1972), Swedish politician
- Torstein Olav Kuvaas (1908–1996), Norwegian politician
- Torstein Kvamme (1893–1985), Norwegian politician
- Torstein Rudihagen (born 1952), Norwegian politician
- Thorsten Schäfer-Gümbel (born 1969), German politician of the SPD
- Torstein Selvik (1900–1983), Norwegian politician
- Torstein Slungård (1931–2009), Norwegian politician
- Thorstein Treholt (1911–1993), Norwegian politician
- Torstein Tynning (1932–2000), Norwegian politician
- Torsten Undén (1877–1962), Swedish diplomat

== Sports ==
- Torstein Andersen Aase (born 1991), Norwegian footballer
- Torsten Abel (born 1974), German triathlete
- Thorsten Barg (born 1986), German football player
- Thorsten Becker (born 1980), German footballer
- Torsten Bréchôt (born 1964), East German judoka
- Thorsten Burkhardt (born 1981), German footballer
- Thorsten Dauth (born 1968), German decathlete
- Thorsten Engelmann (born 1981), German rower
- Thorsten Fink (born 1967), German football coach and former player
- Torsten Frings (born 1976), German footballer
- Thorsten Grönfors (1888–1968), Swedish sailor and tennis player
- Torsten Gütschow (born 1962), German football striker
- Torstein Hansen (1943–2018), Norwegian handball player
- Thorstein Helstad (born 1977), Norwegian footballer
- Thorsten Hohmann (born 1979), German pool player
- Torstein Horgmo (born 1987), Norwegian snowboarder
- Thorstein Johansen (1888–1963), Norwegian rifle shooter
- Thorsten Kirschbaum (born 1987), German footballer
- Thorsten Legat (born 1968), German football coach and retired player
- Thorsten Leibenath (born 1975), German basketball coach and basketball player
- Torsten Loibl (born 1972), German basketball coach
- Thorsten Nehrbauer (born 1978), German footballer
- Thorsten Schmitt (born 1975), German Nordic combined skier
- Thorsten Schmugge (born 1971), German footballer
- Thorsten Stuckmann (born 1981), German football goalkeeper
- Thorsten Svensson (1901–1954), Swedish footballer
- Torsten Tegnér (1888–1977), Swedish athlete and journalist
- Thorsten Wittek (born 1976), German football player

== Other fields ==
- Thorsten Andersson (1923–2018), Swedish toponymist
- Torstein Eckhoff (1916–1993), Norwegian civil servant and professor of law
- Torsten Engberg (1934–2018), Swedish Coastal Artillery lieutenant general
- Þorsteinn Gylfason (1942–2005), Icelandic intellectual
- Torsten Lindh (1941–2020), Swedish Navy rear admiral
- Torstein Moland (born 1945), Norwegian economist
- Thorsten Nordenfelt (1842–1920), Swedish inventor and industrialist
- Thorsten J. Pattberg (born 1977), German philologist and cultural critic
- Torstein Raaby (1919–1964), Norwegian telegrapher, resistance fighter and explorer
- Thorsten Sellin (1896–1994), American sociologist, penologist and scientific criminologist
- Thorstein Veblen (1857–1929), Norwegian-American sociologist and economist

== See also ==
- Turstin, an Anglo-Norman surname
