= Aaron Feinberg =

American inline skater

Personal information
- Full name: Aaron Feinberg
- Nickname: AF
- Born: June 27, 1981 (age 44) Gainesville, Florida
- Height: 5 ft 5 in (1.65 m)

Sport
- Country: United States
- Sport: Aggressive inline skating
- Event: Street
- Turned pro: 1996
Medal record
Competitions
Representing United States
- Updated on 17 November 2014

Aaron Benjamin Feinberg (June 27, 1981) is an American inline skater, born in Gainesville, Florida. Feinberg resides in Portland, Oregon and has been skating since he was 12 years old.

== Skating career ==
Feinberg initially had success as a park skater, skating skateparks and halfpipes, but progressed into a high-energy street skater. Feinberg is defined by his fluid style, high-power skating and constant innovation.

Feinberg rose to the very top of the skating world after being sponsored by Salomon Group. Salomon were so impressed with the talent of the young skater that they released the Salomon Aaron Feinberg Pro Model Inline Skate Model 2001. This skate became one of the most popular selling skates, and catapulted Salomon to a brief domination of the rollerblade market.{{}}

After participating in the X Games, Feinberg secured several competition medals during three years of participation:

1997 - 1st Place Park (Gold)
1998 - 3rd Place Park (Bronze)
1999 - 3rd Place Park (Bronze)

In the Mindgame video Words, Feinberg skates for the first time in a video for Universal Skate Design Team.

Feinberg has been a part of a group of rollers who, over the last two decades, have been responsible for the progression of roller-blading as a spectacle, as well as a sport. During this time, roller-blading has been in the shadow of skateboarding in terms of popularity.

In October 2000 he was ranked fifth in the ASA World Championships.

Feinberg has received a total of four professional skates throughout his career, the first from Salomon (the same model was also the first skate to feature the Universal Frame System) and the rest being released by USD, including the USD Aaron Feinberg aggro skates.

Feinberg no longer skates for the USD Team, but is widely regarded to be one of the best skaters from 1997 until around 2007.

Aaron placed first in the Veterans division at the 2019 Blading Cup.

== Film career ==
Feinberg has appeared in videos such as "Hoax 4", "Brain Fear Gone" (which is an anagram for the name Aaron Feinberg), "Videogroove 9" (VG9), Senate's 1999 team video "Standfast", "Suitable Material", Salomon videos "Focused" (1999) Saltless Water (2000) and "Burning Bridges" (2001), "USD Legacy" (2005), and Mindgame videos "Words" (2002), "Bang!" (2004), and "Accidental Machines" (2006).

== Personal life ==
Feinberg and his girlfriend Meredith are known to frequent local parks with their dog Remi in SE Portland.
