= Thurston House =

Thurston House may refer to:

Places

- Thurston House (Little Rock, Arkansas), listed on the NRHP in Arkansas
- Thurston-Chase Cabin, Centerville, Utah, listed on the NRHP in Utah
- Phineas Thurston House, Barnet, Vermont, listed on the NRHP in Vermont
- Thurston House, East Lothian, in Dunbar, Scotland, rebuilt by John Kinross from 1890 onwards

Book

- Thurston House (novel), a novel by Danielle Steel
