= Winterclash =

Inline skating competition

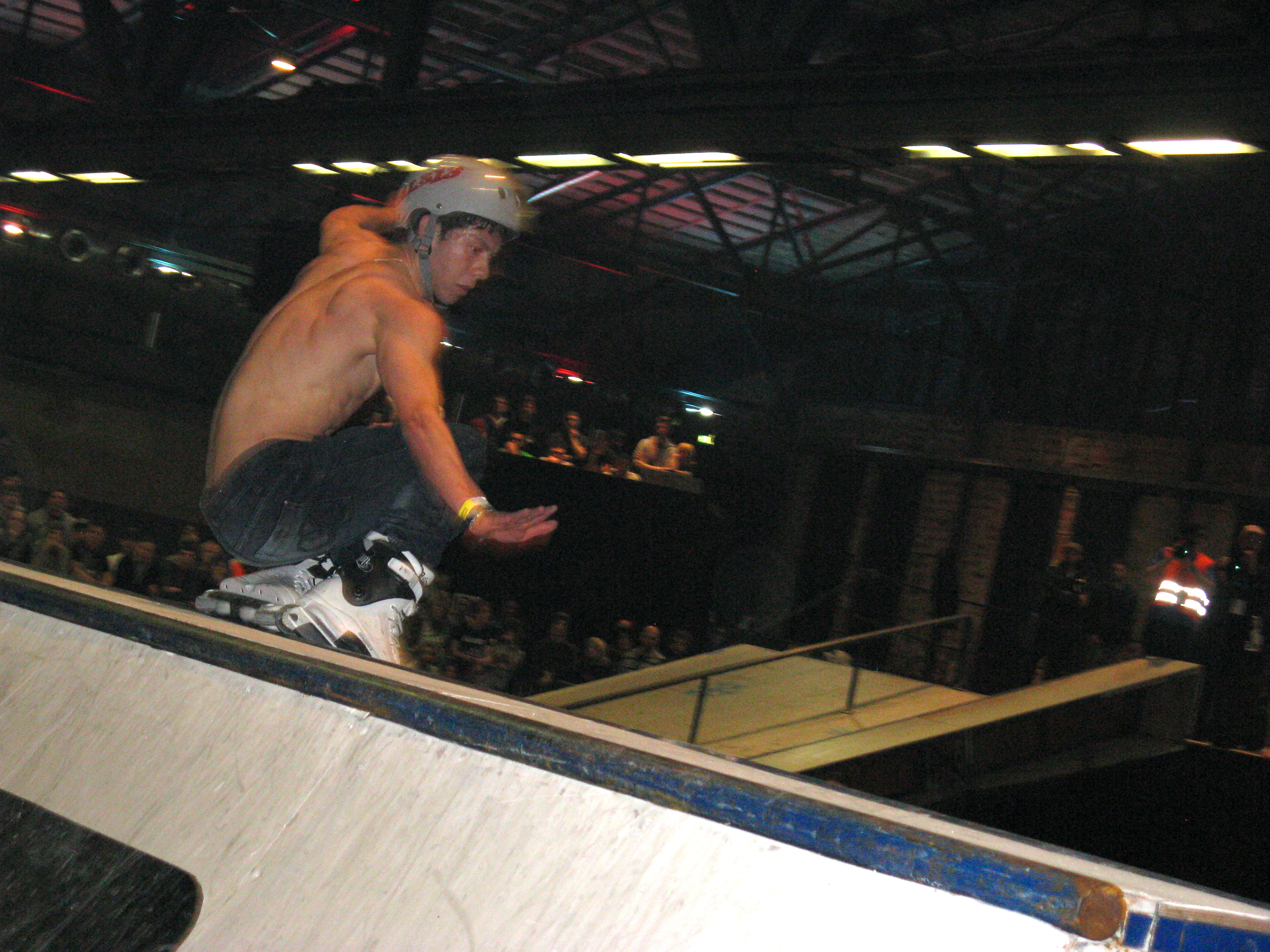
An inline skater at Winterclash in 2010

Winterclash is an aggressive inline skating competition held yearly at the Area 51 Skatepark in Eindhoven. The competition is opened to both amateurs and professionals and attracts riders from all over the world. It has been cited as the largest annual aggressive rollerblading contest in the world.

Winterclash was founded in 2005 by Johannes Jacobi. The first events were held at different skate halls in Germany, before the competition was moved to Eindhoven.
