= Thurston, Oregon =

Thurston, Oregon may refer to:

- Thurston, Springfield, Oregon, a former unincorporated community now a neighborhood of Springfield
- Thurston, a historic locale in Polk County
- Thurston Post Office, a former post office in Linn County

== See also ==
- Thurston (disambiguation)
