= Negligent homicide =

Homicide caused by the negligence of another

Negligent homicide is a criminal charge brought against a person who, through criminal negligence, allows another person to die. Negligent homicide can be distinguished from involuntary manslaughter by its mens rea requirement: negligent homicide requires criminal negligence, while manslaughter requires recklessness.

In the United Kingdom, common law gross negligent manslaughter covers the same conduct as negligent homicide.

== United States ==
In the United States, all states define negligent homicide by statute, often defining the offense as involuntary manslaughter. Negligent homicide may be a lesser included offense to first and second degree murder, as the elements of negligent homicide include elements of those more serious charges.

In some states, negligent homicide charges are possible following the killing of a person while driving under the influence of drugs or alcohol.

== Notable cases ==
The crash of Aeroperú Flight 603 near Lima, Peru resulted in a negligent homicide conviction. An employee had left a piece of duct tape over the static ports on the bottom side of the fuselage while cleaning, which caused the crash. He was charged with and convicted of negligent homicide.

The death of Anneliese Michel, a German woman with epileptic psychosis who died of malnutrition while undergoing an extensive series of exorcism rites, resulted in negligent homicide convictions against her parents and two priests.

The Kamensk-Shakhtinsky rail disaster in the USSR, killing 106 people, was caused by the criminal negligence of two railroad mechanics who failed to check the brakes of a freight train properly.

== See also ==
- Depraved-heart murder
- Moral luck
