= Church of the Intercession (Kamensk-Shakhtinsky) =

Orthodox church in Rostov Oblast, Russia

Coordinates: 48.1910°N 40.1638°E

The Church of the Intercession of the Blessed Virgin Mary
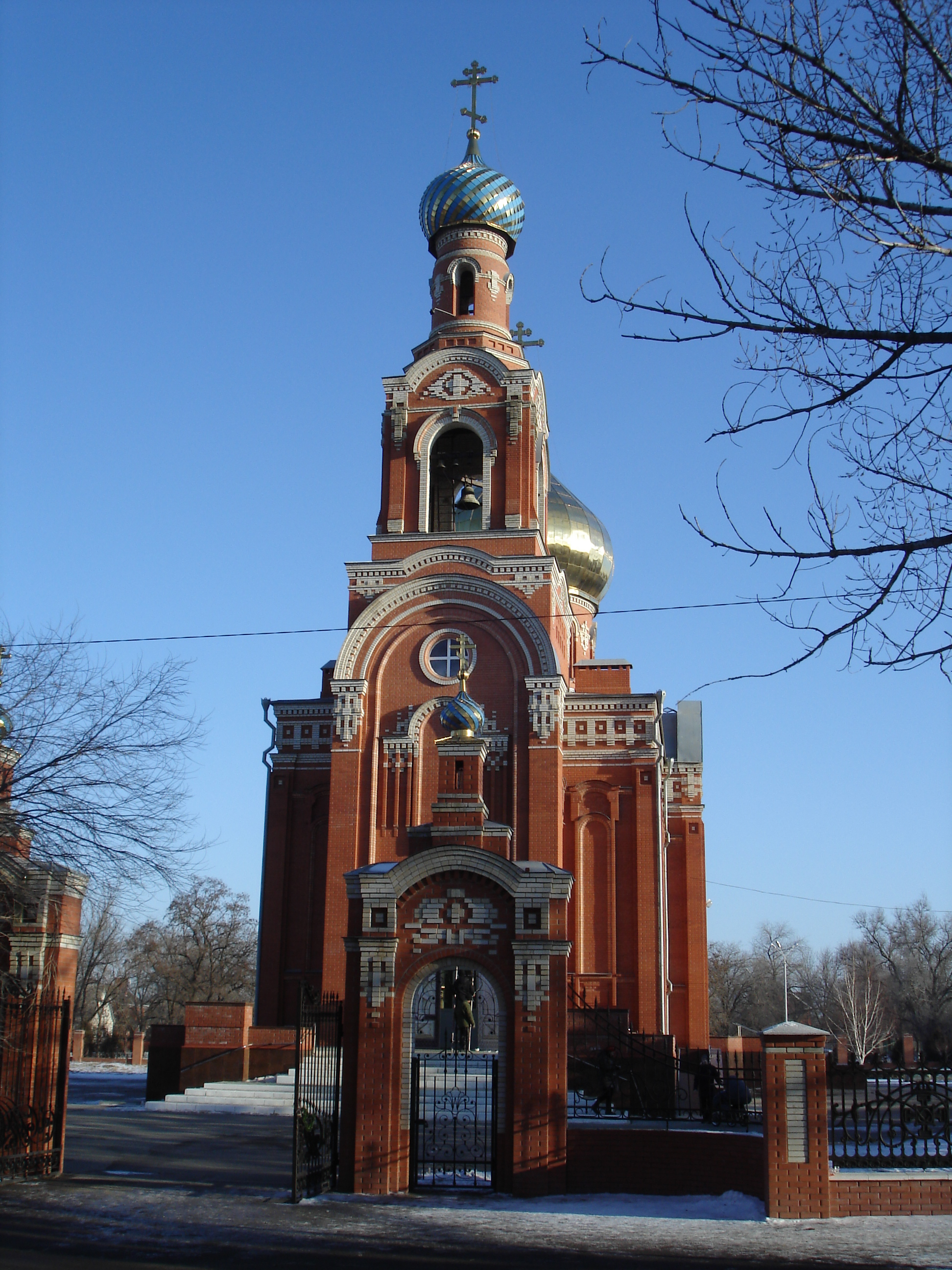

Religion
- Affiliation: Russian Orthodox

Location
- Location: Kamensk-Shakhtinsky, Rostov Oblast, Russia
- Interactive map of The Church of the Intercession of the Blessed Virgin Mary

Architecture
- Completed: 2003

The Church of the Intercession of the Blessed Virgin Mary (Russian: Церковь Покрова Пресвятой Богородицы) is a Russian Orthodox church in Kamensk-Shakhtinsky, Rostov Oblast, Russia. It belongs to Kamenskoe deanery of Shakhty and Millerovo Diocese of Moscow Patriarchate.

== History ==
The Church of the Intercession in Kamensk-Shakhtinsky city was laid on October 14, 1991, on the day of the feast of Intercession of the Holy Virgin. Yet its construction works began only five years after, in 1996 and were conducted on donations made by city residents. It was built on the project of architect G. D. Starykh. (Note: The Church of the Intercession was built near the place where the stone church of Saints Peter and Paul was founded in 1914. It was never completed, and the partially built church was demolished in 1921. A cross commemorates these events.) The church bell-tower has six bells ― five bells are placed in a small belfry, and the main bell that weighs 350 kg and is about a meter in diameter. All of them were cast in Voronezh.

The church, opened on October 14, 2003, has a Sunday school, a parish library, and a canteen for homeless people. Church clergy members and some of the parishioners volunteer at the town hospital, orphanage and high school situated nearby.

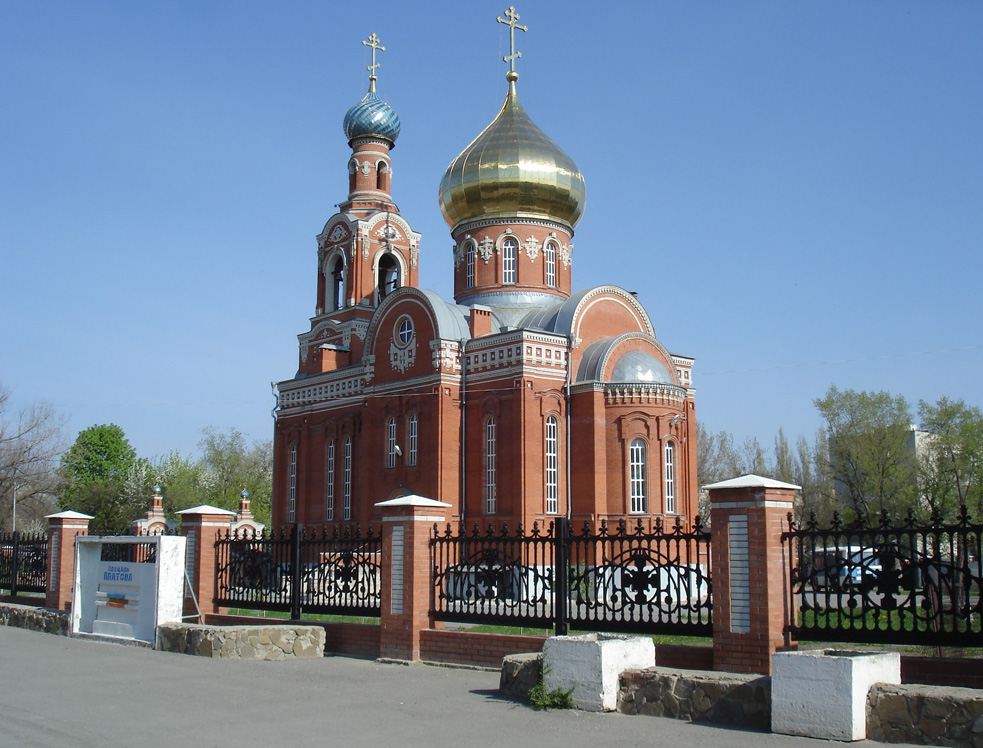
The Church of the Intercession

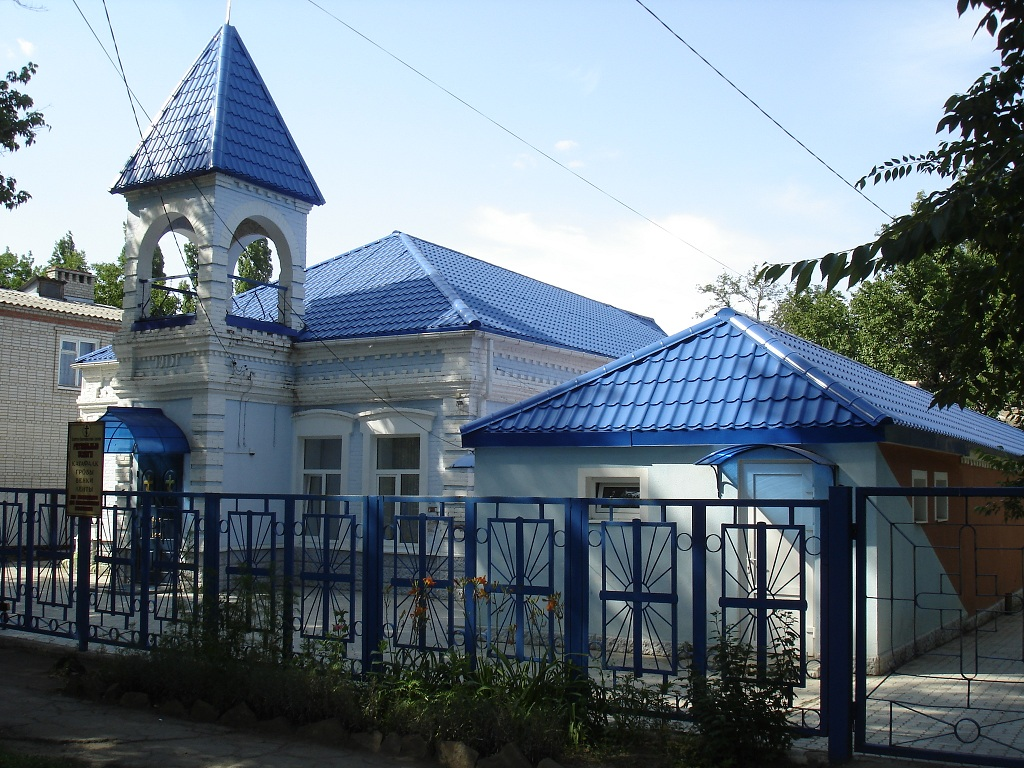
The Church of the Intercession (old building)
