= Deborah Thurston =

American civil engineer

Deborah Lee Thurston is an American civil engineer specializing in the engineering design process and sustainable engineering. She is Gutsgell Professor Emerita of Industrial & Enterprise Systems Engineering at the University of Illinois Urbana-Champaign.

== Education and career ==
Thurston was interested in gymnastics as a high school student in suburban Minnesota, but gave it up to major in civil engineering at the University of Minnesota, where she graduated in 1978. She continued her studies at the Massachusetts Institute of Technology, where she earned a master's degree in 1984 and a Ph.D. in 1987, under the supervision of Joel P. Clark.

She joined the University of Illinois Urbana-Champaign in 1987, as an assistant professor of general engineering, and was the department's only female faculty member from then until 1999. In 2005, the department of general engineering merged with the university's program in industrial engineering to form a department of industrial and systems engineering, and she became the interim head of the department, serving until 2007. She served as interim head again in 2019–2020, before retiring in 2021.

== Recognition ==
Thurston was named as an ASME Fellow in 2010, for "significant contributions through her research in multi-objective engineering design decision making, developing new methods for simultaneous analysis of environmental impacts, production costs, and product performance and quality".
