= Likhaya railway station =

Railway station in Russia

Likhaya Лихая
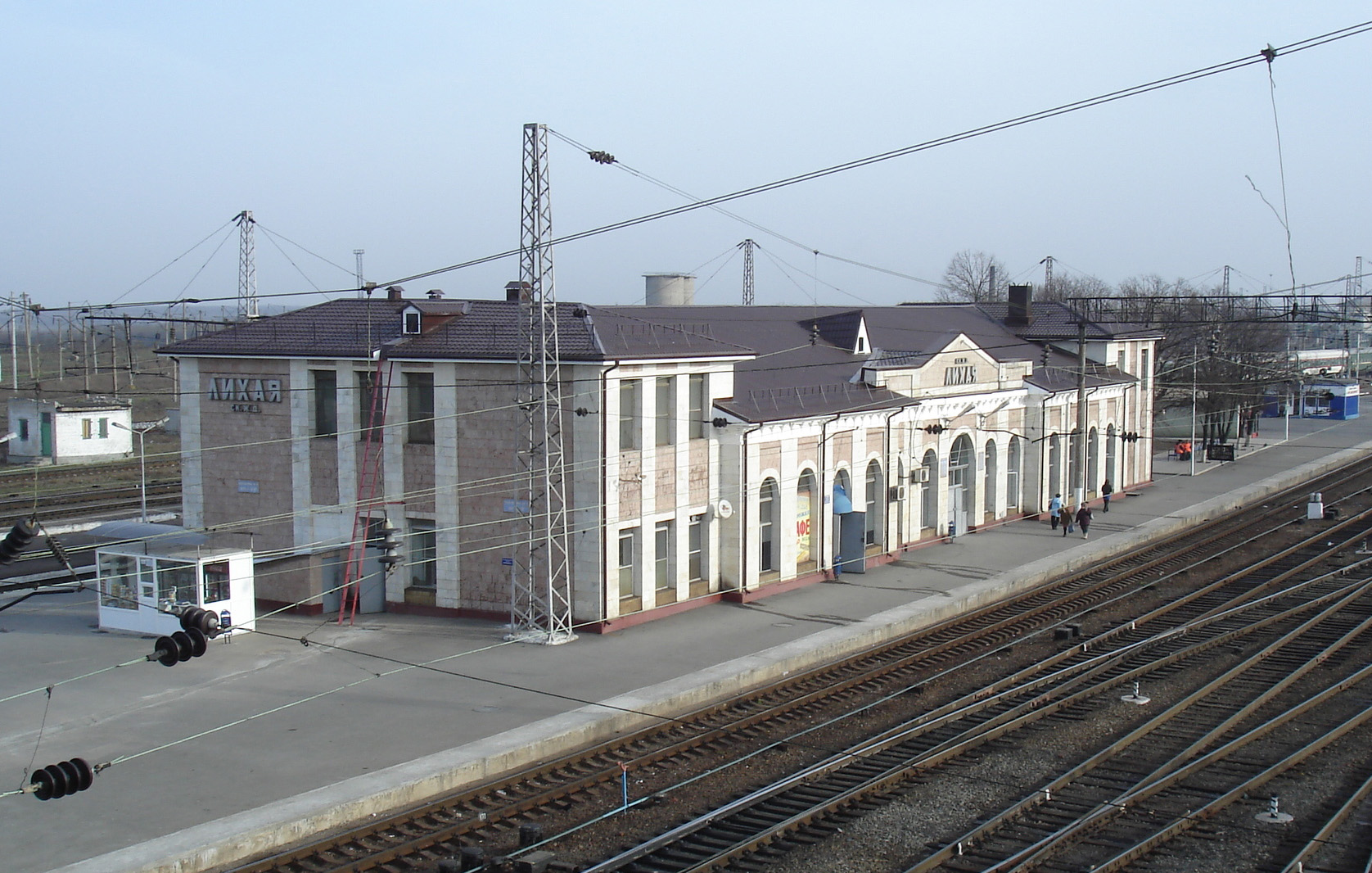
- View of the station from the walking bridge

General information
- Location: 1, Privokzalnaya square, Kamensk-Shakhtinsky, Russia
- Coordinates: 48.156038°N 40.191594°E
- Platforms: 3
- Tracks: 30

Construction
- Parking: yes

Other information
- Station code: 580003

History
- Opened: 1871
- Rebuilt: 1950s
Location

Likhaya railway station (Russian: станция Лихая) is a railway station located in Likhovskoy district of Kamensk-Shakhtinsky, Rostov oblast, Russia. It is 164 km down-line from Rostov-Glavny and is situated between Zamchalovo and Kamenskaya on the Moscow — Rostov-on-Don line. The Likhaya — Volgograd line diverges from the Moscow — Rostov-on-Don to the east of Likhaya and runs to Volgograd via Belaya Kalitva.

== History ==
The main line of the Voronezh — Rostov-on-Don railway and Likhaya station were opened in 1871. The construction began in 1869. The Likhaya — Tsaritsin (now Volgograd) Railway was opened at the beginning of the 20th century. The station suffered considerable destruction during the Russian Civil War and Great Patriotic War. Current station building was built in early 1950s. The Likhaya — Izvaryne branch railway line was disassembled in 1990s. In connection with the increased demand the third track was erected between Likhaya and Zamchalovo.

== Description ==
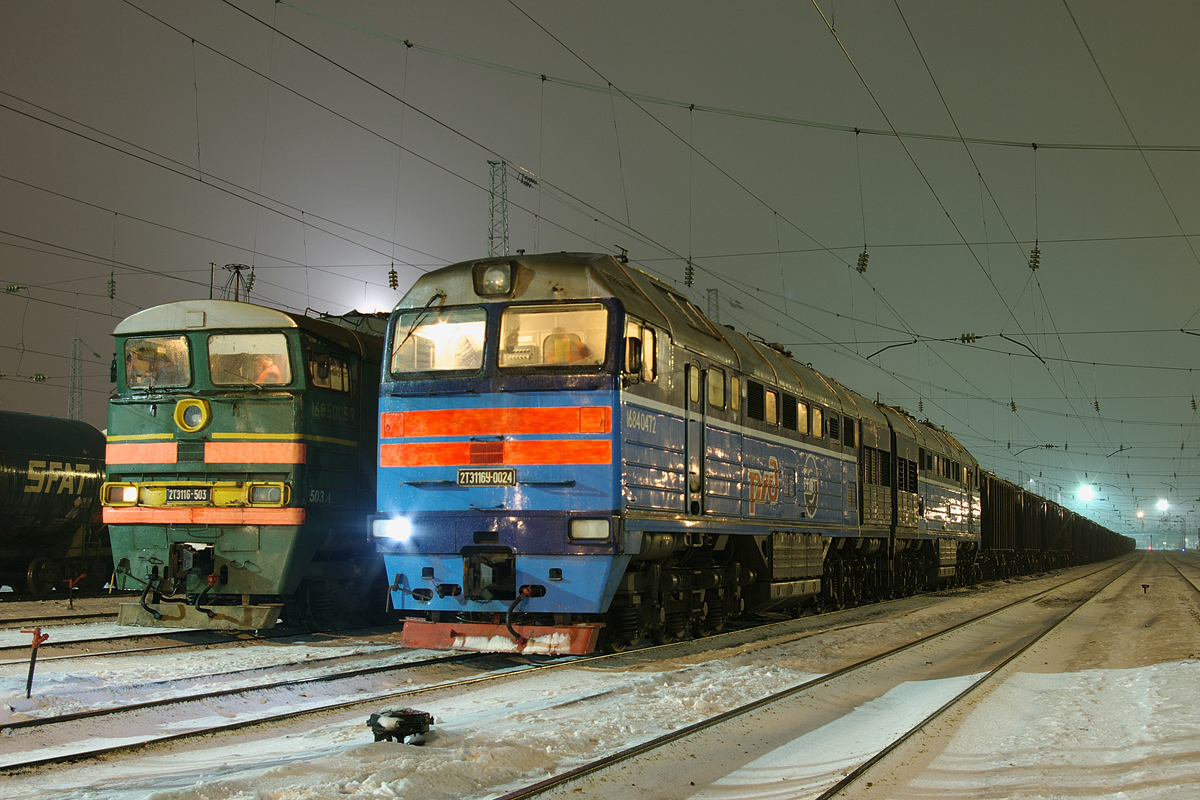
Diesel locomotives 2TE116-503 (left) and 2TE116U-0024 at Likhaya

Likhaya has 3 low-lying through platforms and 10 tracks along the station building. The whole station is electrificated 25 kV AC system. Technical inspection of the rolling stock is carried out on the station. The average stopping times of passenger trains are of about 18 minutes. Locomotive changing to move towards Volgograd on the non-electrified line is required.

The station building is located between the railway tracks. Immediately west of the station lies a walking bridge. The station building is a modest building of two main floors under a tabernacle roof with projections between central and lateral sections and a small triangle pediment over the front entrance. Such architecture performing is not trivial. Designers used architectural forms which give large and high spaces, often modeled on classical forms from the Roman Empire. The high windows of the waiting room have semicircular upper parts. The facade is decorated with pilasters. A cornice above small corbels crowns the top of the station building.

== Services ==
Likhaya is the Kamensk-Shakhtinsky terminus for long-distance and suburban trains operated by Russian Railways. The most common destinations are: Rostov-on-Don, Moscow, Adler, Novorossiysk, Anapa, Kislovodsk, Saint Petersburg, Stavropol, Makhachkala, Sukhumi, Vladikavkaz. The station host suburban trains from Rostov-on-Don, Glubokaya, Chertkovo and Morozovskaya.
