= Toutain =

Toutain is a French surname of Norman origin, itself from Old Norse Þórsteinn. Notable people with the surname include:

- Jules Toutain (1865–1961), French archeologist
- Roland Toutain (1905–1977), French actor
- Thierry Toutain (born 1962), French racewalker

== See also ==
- Pierre Toutain-Dorbec (born 1951), French photographer
- Thorsten
- Turstin
- Toutainville, a French commune in département Eure, région Normandy

== Variant forms ==
- Tostain
- Toustain
- Turstin
