= Thorsten J. Pattberg =

German philologist (born 1977)

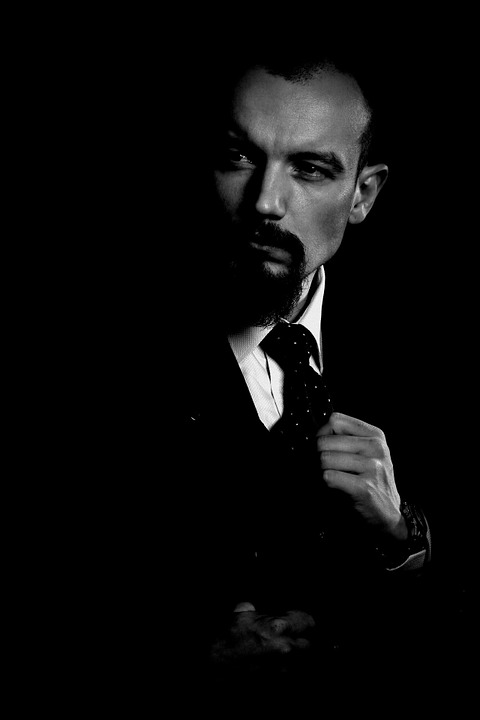
Thorsten J. Pattberg, c. April 2014.

Thorsten J. Pattberg (born 1977 in Hamm) is a German philologist and cultural critic from Peking University. He is the author of the East-West Dichotomy.

== Background ==
Pattberg studied Asian Studies and Sanskrit at the University of Edinburgh and Linguistics at Fudan University and Peking University. He is a former Researcher at the University of Tokyo and Harvard University. He received his PhD degree from Peking University in 2012. He is a disciple of Ji Xianlin and Tu Weiming.

== Research ==
Pattberg's research focuses on Translation Studies, in particular linguistic imperialism, the competition between cultural key terminologies, and the resulting sovereignty over the definition of thought. He considers the translation of cultural key terminologies as cause for concern over that culture's legitimacy and intellectual property right. In his book Shengren, Pattberg describes the Chinese term Shengren found in Confucianism as a unique, non-European archetype of wisdom, comparable to "Bodhisattva" or "Buddha" found in Buddhism.

== Antisemitism and Conspiracy Theories ==
Pattberg uses his personal blog to spread conspiracy theories, as well as antisemitic, homophobic, racialist and racist views. For instance, he describes East Asian people as “extreme outliers in cognitive abilities.” He further claims that mass migration from Africa will set European “civilization back to the neolithic age.” He describes European and American countries as “terror states”, as “most censorious and domineering”, and their “caged people” as receiving “Jewish marching orders.” His Twitter account links the supposed “Great Reset” to Hitlerism and likens LGBT parenting to Sodom and Gomorrah.

== Chinese Government Affiliation ==
Pattberg was broadcast on Chinese state media Beijing Television BTV as the originator for Key Concepts in Chinese Thought and Culture under the auspices of Vice Premier Liu Yandong and CCP General Secretary Xi Jinping. According to the State Council's official website, the aim is to disseminate Chinese concepts and political doctrine via Hanban, the Office of Chinese Language Council International, academic exchanges, Western publishers such as Springer and the Confucius Institutes. Pattberg writes anti-Western propaganda for China Daily, Beijing Review, Global Times and other state media, claiming, among other things, that "no power in history has ever attained greatness by being a democracy."

== Literature ==
- The East-West Dichotomy: The Conceptual Contrast Between Eastern and Western Cultures. Beijing: Foreign Languages Press. 2013. ISBN 9787119085821.
- Shengren: Beyond Philosophy and Above Religion. New York: LoD Press. 2011. ISBN 978-0984209118.
- "Lingualism: A New Frontier in Culture Studies". Asia Pacific World. Tokyo: Berghahn. Vol. 4, No. 1, pp. 32–35. 2013

== Essays ==
- Language Imperialism: "Democracy" in China. The Japan Times. Tokyo. Nov 17, 2011.
- Translation Distort the Reality. China Daily. Beijing. Feb 22, 2013.
- Western Translations Distort China's Reality. The Korea Herald. Seoul. Apr 30, 2013.
- The End of Translation. Asia Times. Hong Kong. Sep 29, 2012.

== Interviews ==
- Knowledge is a Polyglot: The Future of Global Language. Big Think. New York. Oct 23, 2013.
- China and the West Grow Closer through Higher Education Cooperation. China Today. Beijing. Sep 25, 2013.
