= Arlo Eisenberg =

American inline skater

Arlo Eisenberg (born 1973) is an American aggressive inline skater who pioneered street skating. He is considered by many to be an important innovator of the aggressive skating industry.

== Biography ==
=== Early life ===
Born in Dallas, Texas on September 7, 1973, Eisenberg spent his high school years at the Arts Magnet high school in Dallas, where he studied visual arts and theater. He discovered inline skating the summer before his senior year of high school. Eisenberg attended three semesters at the University of Texas at Austin before dropping out to follow his dreams west.

In 1992, Eisenberg moved to Venice Beach, California, where he took odd jobs before landing a position selling inline skates on The 3rd Street Promenade in Santa Monica. In 1993, together with Brooke Howard-Smith, Brian Konoske, Aaron Spohn and Mark "Heineken" Groenhuyzen, he started an inline company called Senate. Eisenberg was the chief graphic designer. Popular images included slit wrists and bloody baseball bats.

Eisenberg crafted an image of himself as a social provocateur, an image which he fostered through his artwork. As a competitive skater, he won the 1996 X Games street title as well as the 1994 NISS Championship. In 1997, Arlo's family opened Eisenbergs Skatepark in Plano, Texas where, every year, they hosted the professional skate competition, the Eisenberg's Showdown at the Hoedown. In 2012, after 15 years of success, the skate park closed down, and was leveled to be replaced with spaces for retail and lofts.

Eisenberg achieved widespread notoriety when Senate produced a line of T-shirts featuring tags that said ‘Destroy All Girls." The tags, Eisenberg's concept, brought attention from CNN, and launched Senate into the mainstream. In 1997, Eisenberg was profiled in People and Newsweek named him one of their 100 Americans for the Next Century."

=== Post-Senate ===
After leaving Senate in 2000, Eisenberg provided freelance graphic design services to many companies in the inline industry including: Salomon, Rollerblade, Xsjado, Mindgame and USD. In 2007, Eisenberg was hired as a senior graphic designer for Paul Frank Industries. Eisenberg was the chief graphic designer for streetwear brand "Franco Shade" since its inception in 2002.

In 2008 Franco Shade's founder, Joe Navran, and Eisenberg agreed to split up over creative differences. Eisenberg kept the "Ghost 'N Knives" logo and the "Franky" ghost cartoon character and started a new company called, "GOST" which launched in early 2009. Franco Shade released one more season after Eisenberg's departure and then ceased operations. In 2011, he designed the movie poster for "The City Never Sleeps."

Arlo Eisenberg appears in two documentaries on skating, 1999's It's All Good' and 2005's Barely Dead.

== Personal life ==
Eisenberg has a daughter named LuLu. She is also the daughter of Lisa Reyes, wife of Ernie Reyes Jr.
