= Thurston House (Little Rock, Arkansas) =

Historic house in Arkansas, United States

- U.S. National Register of Historic Places
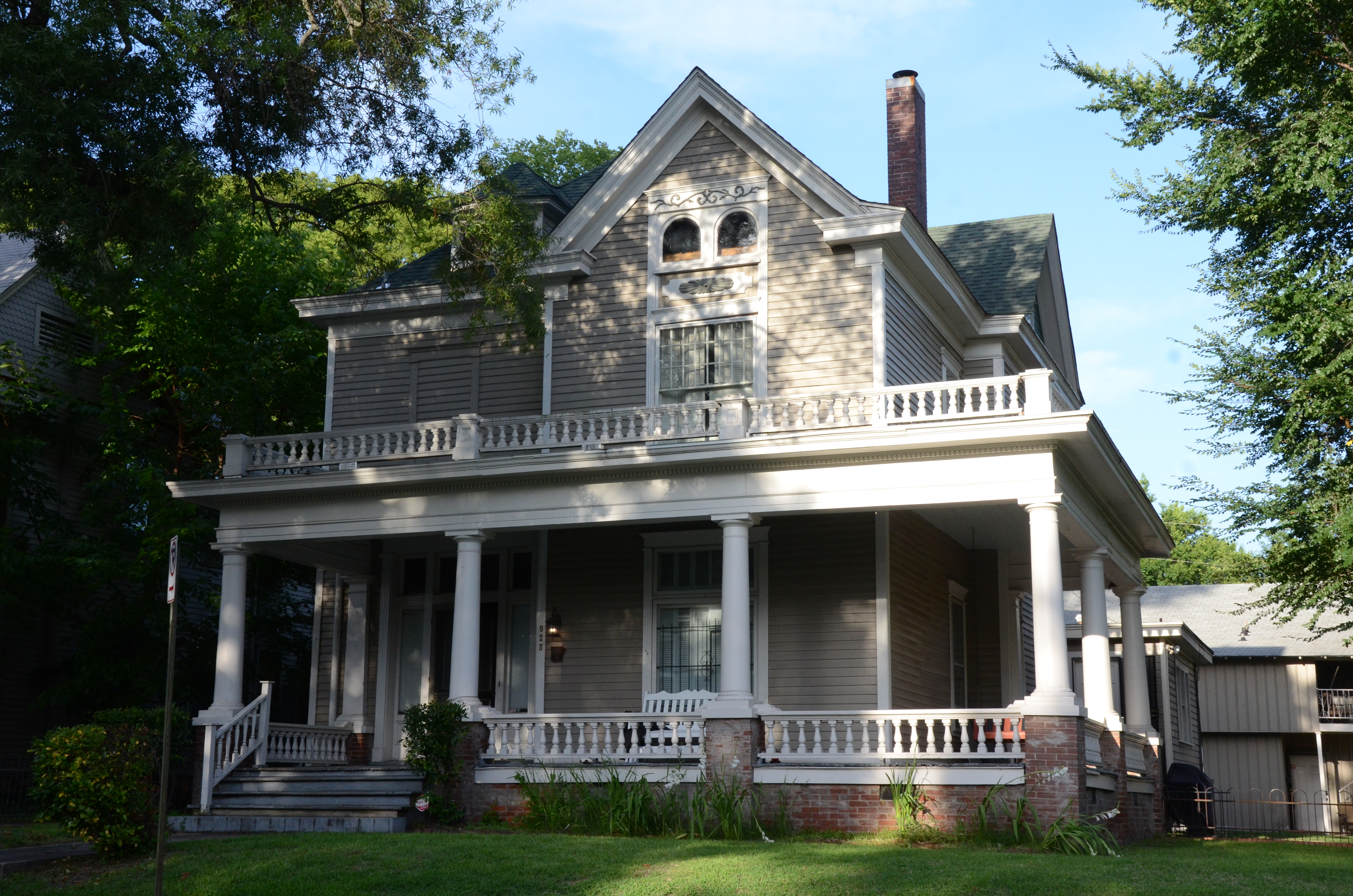

- Location within Arkansas Location within the United States
- Location: 923 Cumberland St., Little Rock, Arkansas
- Coordinates: 34°44′20″N 92°16′8″W
- Built: 1900
- Architect: Charles L. Thompson
- Architectural style: Colonial Revival, Queen Anne
- MPS: Thompson, Charles L., Design Collection TR
- NRHP reference No.: 82000931
- Added to NRHP: December 22, 1982

The Thurston House is a historic house at 923 Cumberland Street in Little Rock, Arkansas. It is a 2 1/2-story wood-frame structure, with a blend of Colonial Revival and Queen Anne styles. It has a hip roof with gabled dormer and cross gabled sections, and its porch is supported by Tuscan columns, with dentil molding at the cornice, and a spindled balustrade. It was designed by noted Arkansas architect Charles L. Thompson and built about 1900.

The house was listed on the National Register of Historic Places in 1982.

== See also ==
- National Register of Historic Places listings in Little Rock, Arkansas
