= Brian Shima =

American inline skater

Brian Matthew Isoa Shima (born December 22, 1981) is a former professional inline skater. Considered one of the greatest in the sport, he also holds the record for the most pro skates held by any person.

He skated professionally for aggressive skating brands USD (universal skate design) & Razor Skates and was, along with Jon Elliot, a former pro skater, co-owner and team rider of Ground Control frames, NIMH Skates, 4x4 Wheels, Vicious Bearings, King Crow bearings and Shima Skate Manufacturing. Along with Jon Elliott and Jan Welch, Shima started a distribution company called Rat Tail in 2002.

Shima owned his own skate brand, named Shima Skate Manufacturing, also known as SSM, which was launched after he left his former company NIMH. He is also co-founder of the World Rolling Series.

== Competitions ==
- 1994 Sea Otter Classic - Monterey, CA - 1st
- 2000 ASA Amateur Finals - Las Vegas, NV - 1st
- April 8, 2001 IMYTA #2 - Paris, France - 1st
- 2001 Gravity Games - 4th
- 2001 ASA Pro Tour - Anaheim, California - 1st
- 2001 Eisenberg's Hoedown - Plano, Texas - 1st
- 2001 IMYTA #3 - Detroit, MI - 2nd
- 2002 Gravity Games - 2nd
- 2002 Superhick - Atlanta, GA
- 2002 Eisenberg's Hoedown - Plano, Texas - 3rd
- 2002 Eisenberg's Hoedown - Plano, Texas - 1st Best Trick
- July 7, 2002 IMYTA #8 - Montreal, Canada - 1st
- 2002 ASA World Championships - 19th
- 2002 ASA Pro Tour - San Diego, California - 17th
- 2003 RFCC Tour Contest (915 Skatepark) - Greensboro, NC - 2nd
- 2003 RFCC Tour Contest (Vertigo Skatepark) - Boardman, OH - 1st
- 2003 Superhick - Atlanta, Georgia - 1st
- 2003 RFCC World Finals (Airborne Skatepark) - Detroit, MI - 1st
- November 13, 2004 - RFCC World Finals - Kona, FL - 2nd
- 2004 Barn Burner - Renton, WA - 1st
- 2004 Eisenberg's Hoedown - Plano, Texas - 2nd
- 2005 Fise Competition - Montpellier, France - 1st
- May 30, 2005 LG Action Sports Tour - Cincinnati, Ohio - 1st
- 2005 LG Action Sports Tour - Paris, France - 8th
- 2005 LG Action Sports Tour - Munich, Germany - 3rd
- 2005 LG Action Sports Championship, Manchester, UK - 3rd
- 2005 LG Action Sports Tour - Sacramento, California - 10th (VERT)
- 2008 Asian X Games - Shanghai, China - 5th
- 2008 Bitter Cold Showdown - Bordman, Ohio - 4th
- 2008 LG Action Sports Tour - Seattle, Washington - 4th
- 2009 Barn Burner - Seattle, Washington - 1st
- 2009 Australian Rolling Open - Melbourne, Australia- 3rd
- 2009 FISE - Montpellier, France - 10th
- 2010 Bitter Cold Showdown - Detroit, Michigan - 8th
- 2011 Bitter Cold Showdown - Detroit, Michigan - 9th

== Signature products ==
Hardgoods

- Fifty-50 Shima Grindplate (1999)
- Medium Rat Bastard Wheel
- Mindgame Shima Wheel
- 4x4 Shima Edition 1 Wheel 60mm/88a
- 4x4 Shima Edition 2 Wheel 60mm/88a
- 4x4 Shima Edition 3 Wheel 58mm/89a
- 4x4 Shima Hi-Lo Wheel 56mm/90a
- 4x4 Shima Hi-Lo Wheel 47mm/90a
- Ground Control Hi-lo Shima frame
- Ground Control Featherlite Shima frame

== Filmography ==
Brian has appeared in several videos such as:

- Children of the Night (c) 1996 Medium
- Film of the Year (C) 1997 Medium
- Espionage (C) 1997 PRN
- Smell the Glove (C) 1998 Medium
- Amateur (C) 1998 Joe Navran
- Elements 2 (C) 1999 PRN
- United Front (C) 2000 Jan Welch
- Brain Fear Gone (C) 2000 Trendkiller
- Coup de Tat (C) 2000 Joe Navran & USD
- UnCloned Razor team Video 2001
- What Do You Believe In? (C) 2001 Trendkiller
- Concentration (C) 2001 Escozoo Media
- United Front 2: Trash (C) 2003 Jan Welch
- Razor's Closer (C) 2003 Beau Cottington & Razor's
- 8th Annual Hoedown (C) 2004 Jason Reyna Project
- Leading The Blind (C) 2004 Jan Welch/Patrick Lennen & 4x4 Urethane
- Ego (C) 2004 Adam Johnson & Razor's
- Killer Boots (C) 2005 Artistry Productions
- Barely Dead (C) 2006 Misled Media
- Drip Drop (C) 2008 Old Apple Films
- Nimh Video (C) 2011 Monk & Race
