= Aggressive inline skating =

Sport discipline

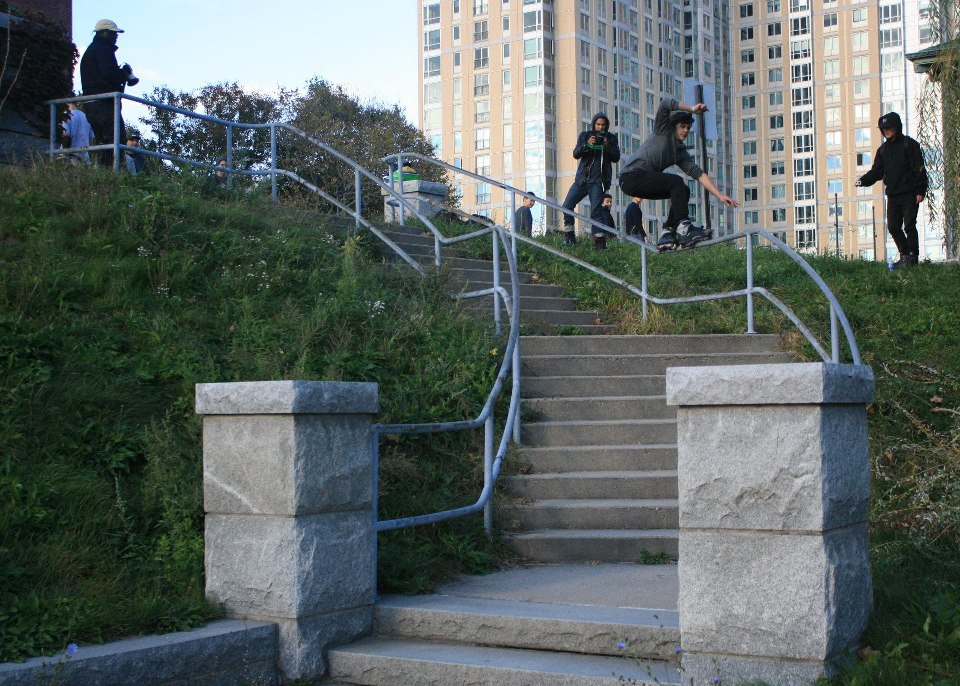
- Soul Grind
- Nicknames: Aggressive skating, street skating, rollerblading, blading
- First organized: 1990s

Characteristics
- Type: Outdoor or indoor
- Equipment: Aggressive inline skates

Presence
- World Championships: World Skate Games, 2017–; X Games, 1995–2004

Aggressive inline skating is a sub-discipline of inline skating in the action sports canon. Aggressive inline skates are designed to accommodate grinds and jumps, which can be performed on street obstacles or at skate parks.

== History ==
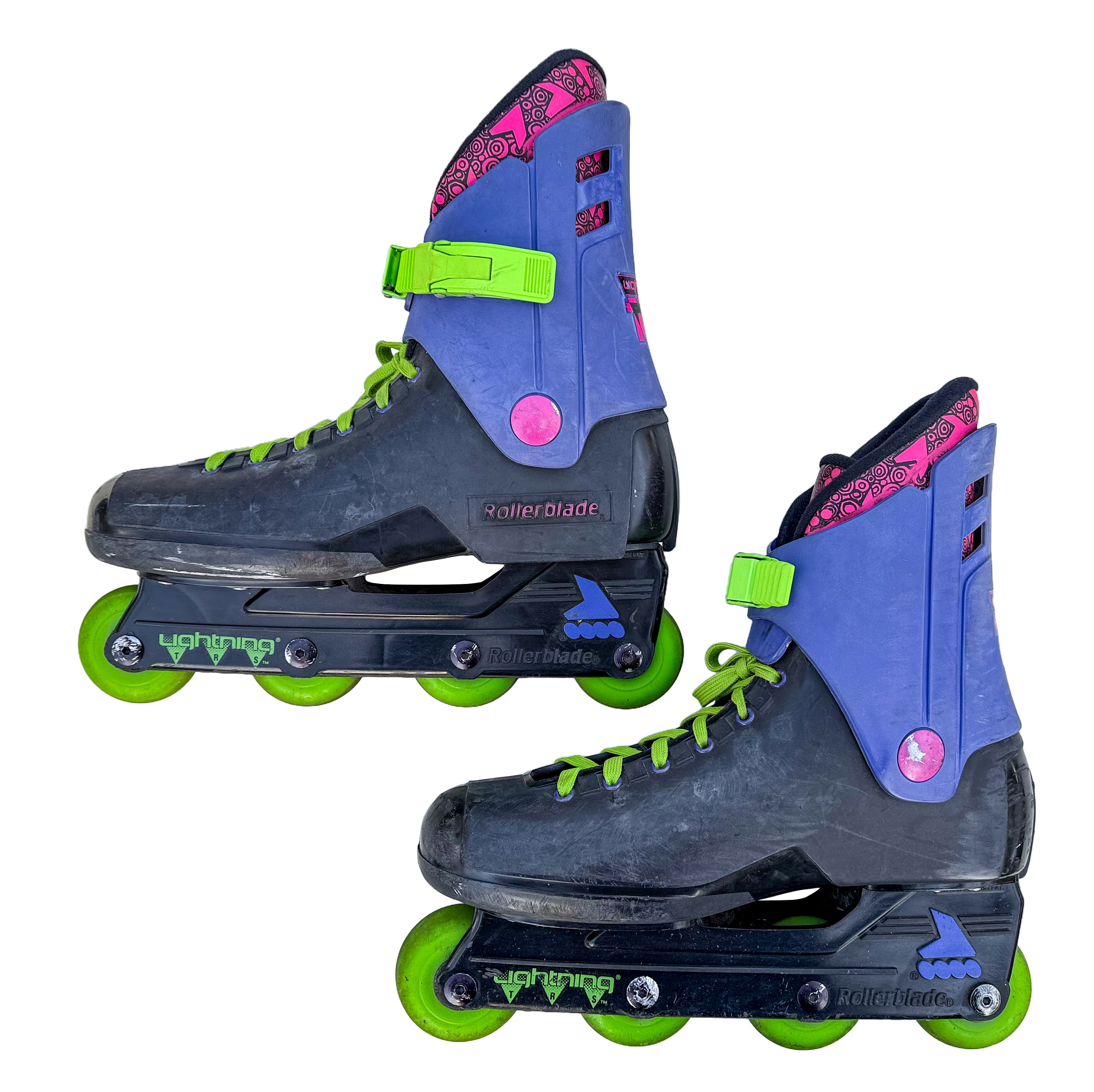
Lightning TRS, 1988

In 1980, a group of ice hockey players in Minnesota were looking for a way to practice during the summer. Scott and Brennan Olson formed the company Rollerblade, Inc., to sell skates with four polyurethane wheels arranged in a straight line on the bottom of a padded boot. In 1988, Rollerblade introduced the first aggressive inline skate, the Rollerblade Lightning TRS. Aggressive inline skating developed as an organized sport in the early 1990s. In 1994 the National Inline Skate Series, better known as NISS, was launched as the first aggressive skating competition series. Promoters Rick Stark and Mark Billik sold Taco Bell on sponsoring the series for $150,000 and a six stop series was born. NISS, went strong for 5 years holding contests in Los Angeles, New York, Rome and Brazil. NISS was the first series to put aggressive inline on television with an ESPN deal for the 1994 series and later moving the competition series to PRIME TICKET-Fox Sports. The Aggressive Skaters Association (ASA) was formed by a number of aggressive inline skaters in 1995 as a forum to develop rules governing competitions and equipment. The sport was included in the first ESPN X-Games in 1995 and included vertical ramp and street event competitions. It reached its height in popularity in the late 90s, with mainstream movies like Disney's Brink! and other films. The brand "Senate", run by Arlo Eisenberg and several other prominent skaters, enjoyed mainstream popularity during the 1990s.

Founded by company owners/skating legends Brian Shima, Jon Julio, and Kato Mateu and supported by all major skate companies, the World Rolling Series (WRS) links together the best skaters as Pablo Skorpanich, Brian Aragon, Cesar Mora, Jon Julio, event organizers, retailers and skate parks and aims to "create a tighter knit community, increase overall awareness and set a higher standard for aggressive rollerblading." The WRS circuit started in 2009 with 10 established professional contests in France, Netherlands, England, Spain, Argentina, Australia and the United States. In 2012, WRS included 100+ amateurs and professional events in over 20 countries.

Aggressive inline skating was removed from the ESPN X-Games in 2005 although it is still included in the Asian X Games, LG Action Sports Competitions, Montpellier Fise, and many other large competitions, some associated with WRS, some not.

Due to the Russian invasion of Ukraine, World Skate banned Russian and Belarusian athletes and officials from its competitions, and will not stage events in Russia or Belarus.

== Hardware ==
Aggressive skates are identifiable from recreational or speed skates by a prominent gap in between the second and third wheels (The H-Block) which allows for grinds perpendicular to the direction of the wheels. A hard plastic surface on the sole of the boot known as a "Sole plate" or "Soul Plate" allows grinds parallel to the direction of the wheels. From these grind surfaces comes a lexicon of well known grind stances, though sliding can occur on any surface of the boot or wheels. Aggressive skates typically have much smaller wheels than traditional inline skates. The small size allows for more freedom when grinding as there is less risk of catching and sticking. Aggressive skate wheels often feature a flat profile to accommodate the impact from jumping tall heights. In recent years aggressive skates have begun to adopt larger frames and wheels, in what is seen as a bridging of the various inline disciplines.

Part	Definition	Image
Cuff	An ankle support cuff with an adjustable strap	
Shell	A boot made of high-impact plastic that surrounds and protects the feet	
Liner	A soft inner boot	
Buckle	Cuff locking system	
Shock absorber	Soft resin part placed under liners that absorbs impact from landing	
Soul plate	A flat, hard plastic plate on the outer sole of the boot. Modern models have replaceable soul plates	
Negative soul plate	A flat, hard plastic plate on the inner sole of the boot	
Frame	A hard plastic chassis for the wheels. UFS - Universal Frame System is unified type of frame with flat top area and fits all modern skates	
Backslide plate	A grinding area flush with the soul plate, near the middle of the boot, used for grinding on the boot	
H-block	Area on frame between inner wheels that locks on obstacle and grinds	
Wheels	Two to four polyurethane wheels with bearings	
Anti-rocker wheels	The two inner wheels smaller diameter made of plastic or hard urethane placed in the middle of frame, installed to make grinds easier on wider surfaces.	

=== Frames ===
The frame is the wheel-holding chassis underneath the boot of the skate. The common feature of aggressive skate frames is the space between the second and third wheels known as an H-block. H-blocks are designed as an intended grind space, with varying sizes and designs to accommodate different styles of skating. Like all skate parts, frames were initially an integrated part of the boot and were not interchangeable. As aggressive skate designs developed, replaceable parts became standard. In the late 1990s, the Universal Frame System (UFS) was introduced. The standard allowed any UFS frame to fit any UFS compatible boot for greater setup customization. Today, all major aggressive frame and skate manufacturers support UFS. Aggressive skate frames are designed to accommodate the three primary wheel setups: Flat, anti-rocker, and freestyle.

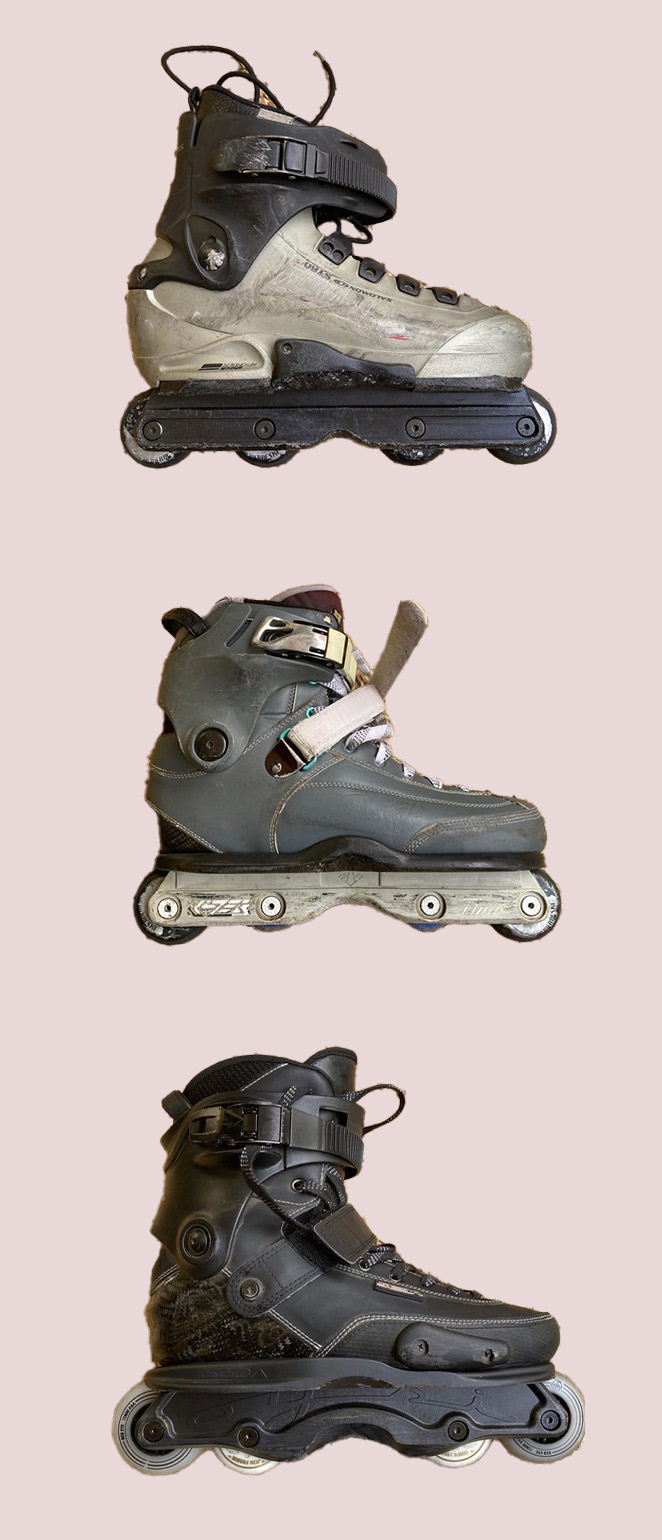
Flat, Anti-Rocker, and Hi-Low wheel setups.

=== Wheels, anti-rocker wheels, and freestyle frame setups ===
Aggressive skate wheels are usually between 54 and 72mm, while anti-rocker wheels are between 40 and 47mm. The balance between hardness and grip is the key to an optimum skate wheel.

Anti-rocker wheels are small, hard wheels designed for grinding rather than rolling. Their size allows for easier access to the H-block when installed in the 2nd and 3rd wheel positions. Anti-rocker wheels are typically made of high durometer urethane or plastic, allowing them to slide while grinding. Despite not rolling on the ground, anti-rockers are capable of rotating should they make contact with hard surfaces; which many find superior to having no wheels in the center positions (a sliding hazard). "Anti-rocker" refers to the inverse size of the second and third wheels compared to the first and fourth; whereas a "rockered" wheel setup consists of smaller wheels in the first and fourth positions to simulate the curvature of an ice-skate blade. Riding without center wheels is known as a "freestyle" setup, and offers the maximum potential space to grind. Anti-rocker and freestyle setups are generally less maneuverable than flat setups due to a lack of central pivot points under the foot. Some frames combine wheels of differing sizes that all make ground contact.

== Media ==
=== Video ===
Skate videos began in 1993 with the release of "Dare to Air", a Video Groove series and "Air Attack". K2, Bauer and Rollerblade were early proponents of the sport and released their own videos. Senate, arguably the first inline-only company, released a number of influential films during the 1990s. Videogroove, Mindgame, Razors, KFC, and Valo released a number of notable films during the early 2000s. During this period the genre transitioned from VHS to DVD like much of the rest of the entertainment industry. They have similarly transitioned to the digital format since the 2010s.

Skate videos, like their skateboarding and BMX counterparts, feature skaters both professional and amateur, in "edits," segments of skating usually accompanied by one or more songs. Music is often used without permission. Alternatively, original music is sometimes created specifically for the film.

A 2006 documentary, Barely Dead, gives an overview of skating, focusing on its popularity and decline.

== Magazines – print and online ==
- 8up – USA; retired
- Abec – Spain; retired
- Amateur – France; retired
- Art of Rolling - USA; retired
- Balance – USA; retired
- Be-Mag – USA
- Blade Attack – Germany; retired
- Blader Union – USA; retired
- Box – USA; retired
- Clac – France; retired
- Crazy Roller – France; retired
- Daily Bread – USA; retired
- DNA – UK; retired
- Fourinarow – Australia; retired
- FUNBOX – The Netherlands; retired
- GRIND – Germany; retired
- Haitian Mag – USA; retired
- Life+ – USA; retired
- [MAG] – The Netherlands; retired
- ONE – USA
- Radius Media – USA; retired
- Radvocate – USA; retired
- Scum Magazine – USA; retired
- Skipboot Magazine – USA
- Skitch Magazine – USA; retired
- Soul Magazine – retired
- Unity – UK; retired
- Videogroove – USA; retired
- Wheelscene – UK

== Competitions ==
The largest aggressive inline skating focused competitions are:

- Winterclash (Eindhoven, The Netherlands)
- Blading Cup (Santa Ana, California)
- The Roller Freestyle Skating World Championships has been included in the World Skate Games since 2017, organized by World Skate, the official organization on roller sports recognized by the IOC
- The Montreal Cup (Montreal, Canada), the largest skating event in Canada, including an aggressive inline skate competition, organized by Solo Inline shop.
