= Kamensk-Shakhtinsky =

Town in Rostov Oblast, Russia

Kamensk-Shakhtinsky Каменск-Шахтинский
- Town
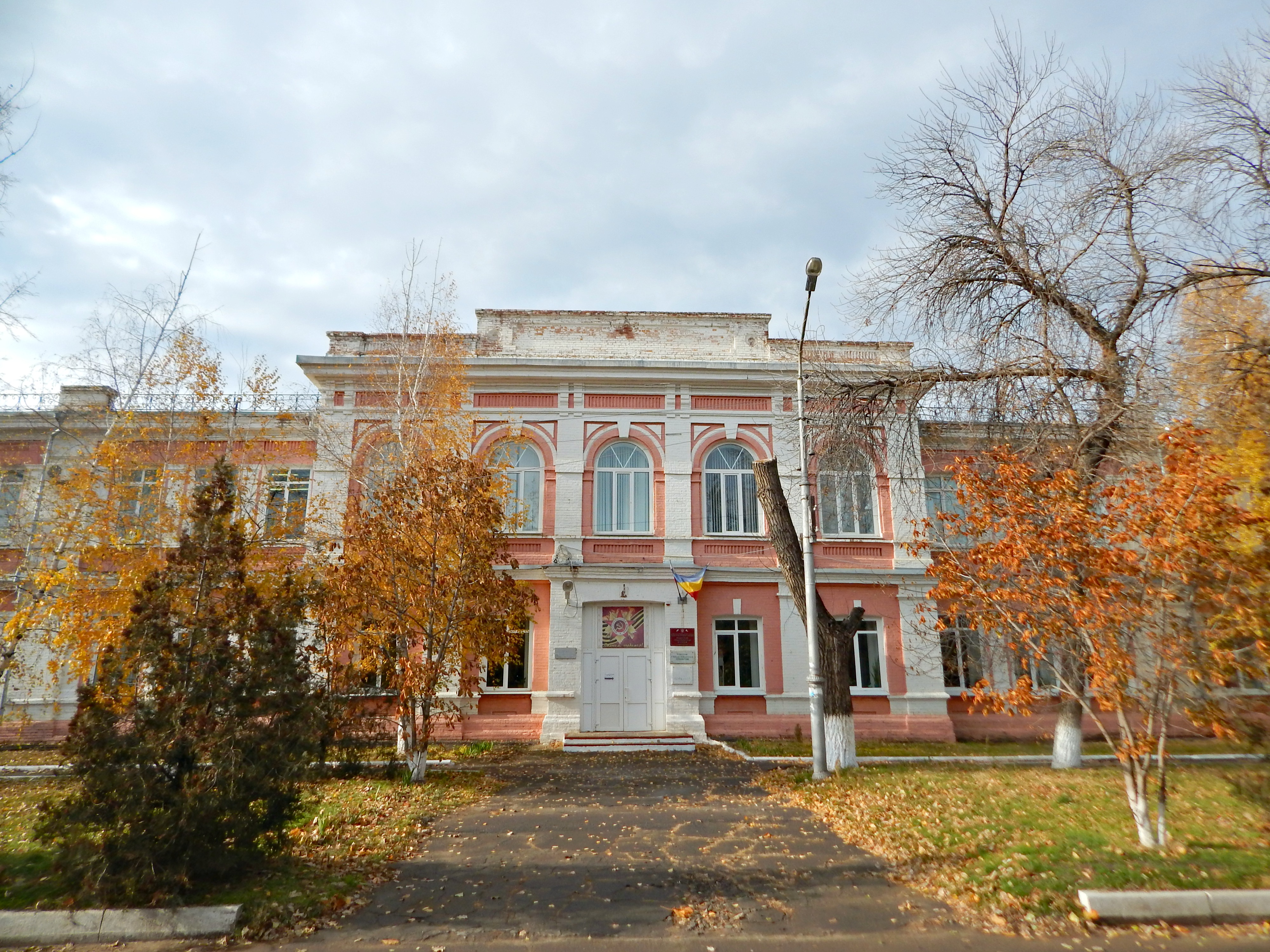

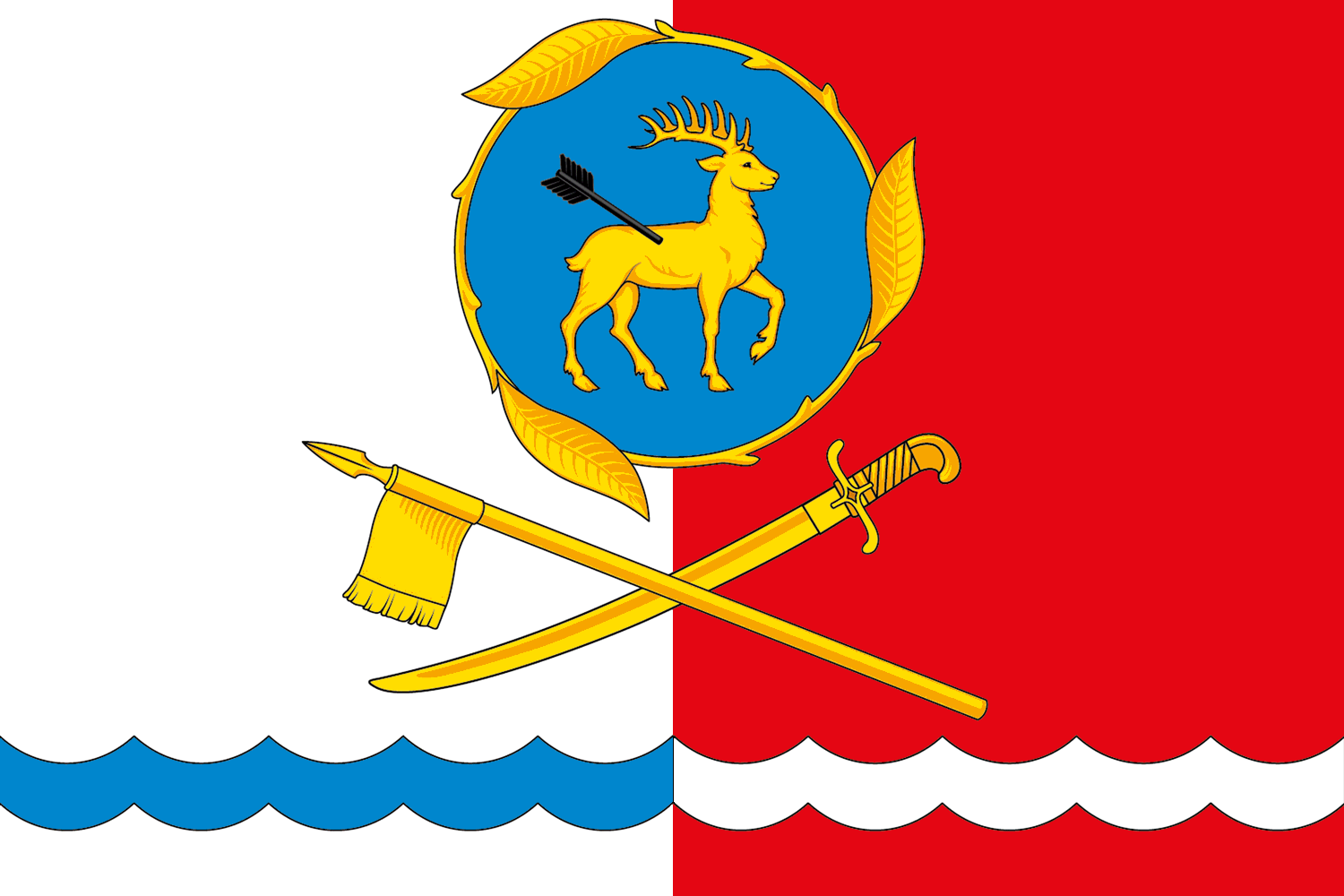
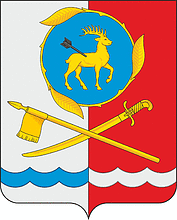
- Flag Coat of arms
- Interactive map of Kamensk-Shakhtinsky
- Location of Kamensk-Shakhtinsky Kamensk-Shakhtinsky (European Russia) Kamensk-Shakhtinsky (Russia)
- Coordinates: 48°19′14″N 40°15′40″E
- Country: Russia
- Federal subject: Rostov Oblast
- Founded: 1686
- Town status since: 1927
- Elevation: 60 m (200 ft)

Population (2010 Census)
  - Total: 95,296
  - Estimate (2025): 82,425 (−13.5%)
  - Rank: 180th in 2010

Administrative status
  - Subordinated to: Kamensk-Shakhtinsky Urban Okrug
  - Capital of: Kamensk-Shakhtinsky Urban Okrug

Municipal status
  - Urban okrug: Kamensk-Shakhtinsky Urban Okrug
  - Capital of: Kamensk-Shakhtinsky Urban Okrug
- Time zone: UTC+3 (MSK)
- Postal code: 347800
- Dialing code: +7 86365
- OKTMO ID: 60719000001

Kamensk-Shakhtinsky (Russian: Ка́менск-Ша́хтинский, IPA: [ˈkamʲɪnsk ˈʂaxtʲɪnskʲɪj]) is a town in Rostov Oblast, located on the Seversky Donets River, around 15 kilometres (9.3 mi) east of the border with Ukraine's Luhansk Oblast. Population: 95,296 (2010 census); 75,632 (2002 census); 72,379 (1989 Soviet census).

== History ==
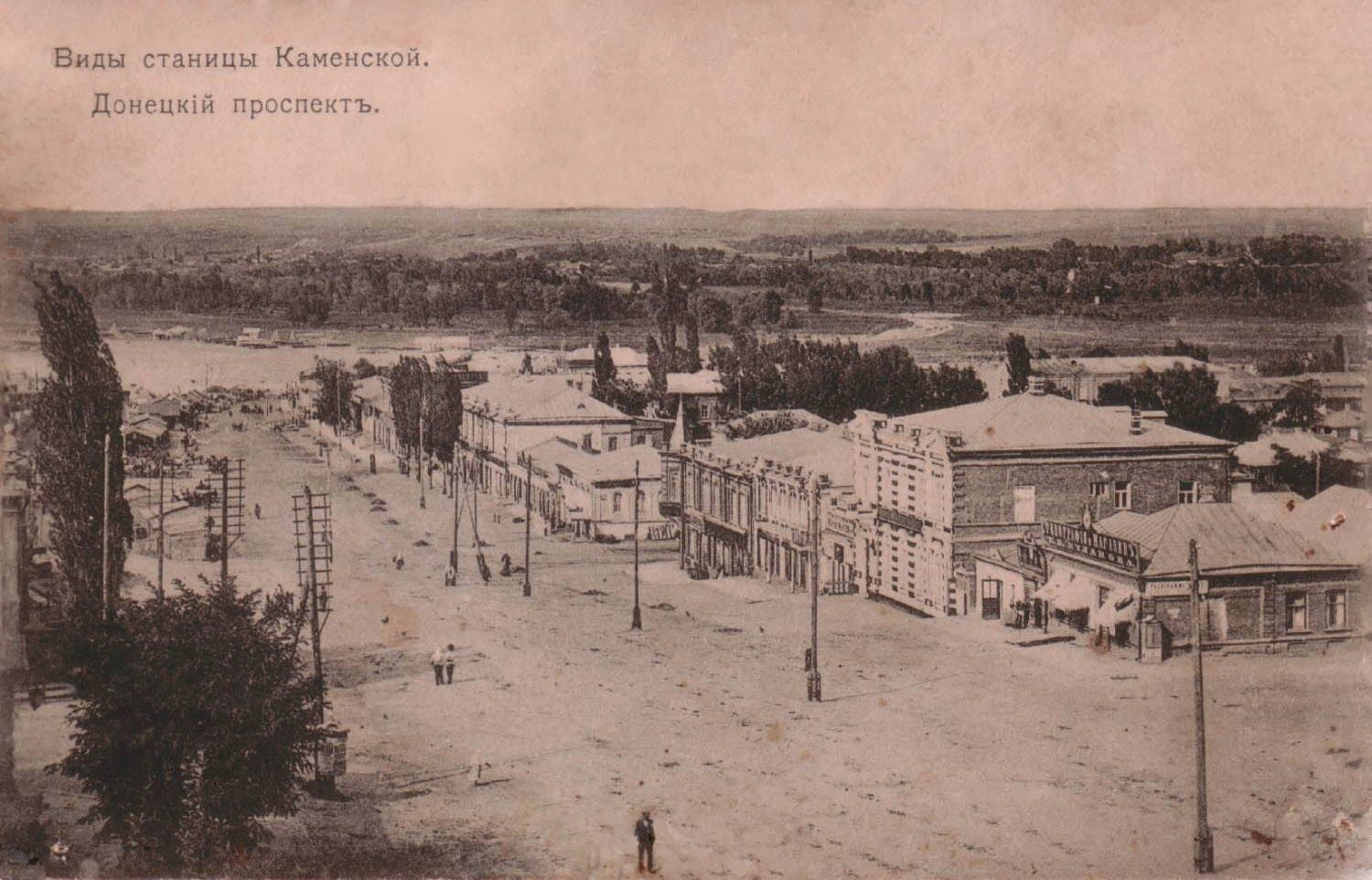
Early-20th-century view

It was founded by Cossack settlers in 1686. It was administratively part of the Donets Governorate of Ukraine from 1920 to 1924. It was granted town status in 1927. During World War II, it was under German occupation from July 1942 to February 1943.

On 28 August 2024 the FDKU Atlas fuel storage facility was set ablaze by Ukrainian drones, in the ongoing battle since the 2022 Russian invasion of Ukraine. The facility is part of the Federal Agency for State Reserves.

== Administrative and municipal status ==
Within the framework of administrative divisions, it is incorporated as Kamensk-Shakhtinsky Urban Okrug—an administrative unit with the status equal to that of the districts. As a municipal division, this administrative unit also has urban okrug status.

== Economy ==
Once a major coal-mining center of the eastern Donets coal basin, it now an important producer of artificial fibers and mining machinery as well as glass. European route E40 passes through Kamensk-Shakhtinsky. The Kamensky chemical plant is located at the city.

== Climate ==
Climate data for Kamensk-Shakhtinsky (1991–2020)
Month	Jan	Feb	Mar	Apr	May	Jun	Jul	Aug	Sep	Oct	Nov	Dec	Year
Mean daily maximum °C (°F)	−0.9 (30.4)	0.1 (32.2)	7.0 (44.6)	16.7 (62.1)	23.5 (74.3)	28.5 (83.3)	30.5 (86.9)	30.1 (86.2)	23.2 (73.8)	14.9 (58.8)	5.9 (42.6)	0.8 (33.4)	15.0 (59.0)
Daily mean °C (°F)	−3.9 (25.0)	−3.4 (25.9)	2.4 (36.3)	10.4 (50.7)	16.8 (62.2)	21.8 (71.2)	23.8 (74.8)	23.0 (73.4)	16.5 (61.7)	9.5 (49.1)	2.4 (36.3)	−1.9 (28.6)	9.8 (49.6)
Mean daily minimum °C (°F)	−6.6 (20.1)	−6.2 (20.8)	−1.1 (30.0)	5.0 (41.0)	10.7 (51.3)	15.5 (59.9)	17.4 (63.3)	16.0 (60.8)	10.5 (50.9)	5.1 (41.2)	−0.4 (31.3)	−4.3 (24.3)	5.1 (41.2)
Average precipitation mm (inches)	34.5 (1.36)	30.5 (1.20)	31.1 (1.22)	29.8 (1.17)	45.4 (1.79)	42.1 (1.66)	58.2 (2.29)	28.7 (1.13)	32.3 (1.27)	36.0 (1.42)	31.8 (1.25)	39.7 (1.56)	440.1 (17.33)
Average precipitation days (≥ 1.0 mm)	7	6	7	5	6	6	6	4	5	6	6	7	71
Average relative humidity (%)	84	81	75	63	61	56	55	53	62	73	81	85	69
Source: NOAA

== Gallery ==
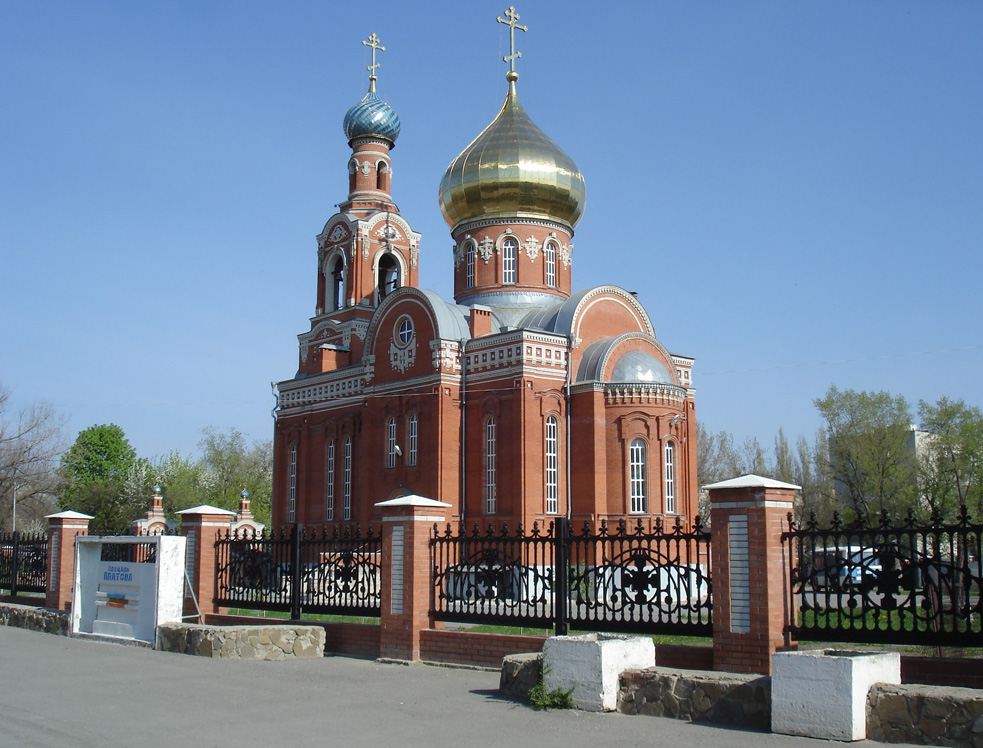
Church of the Intercession

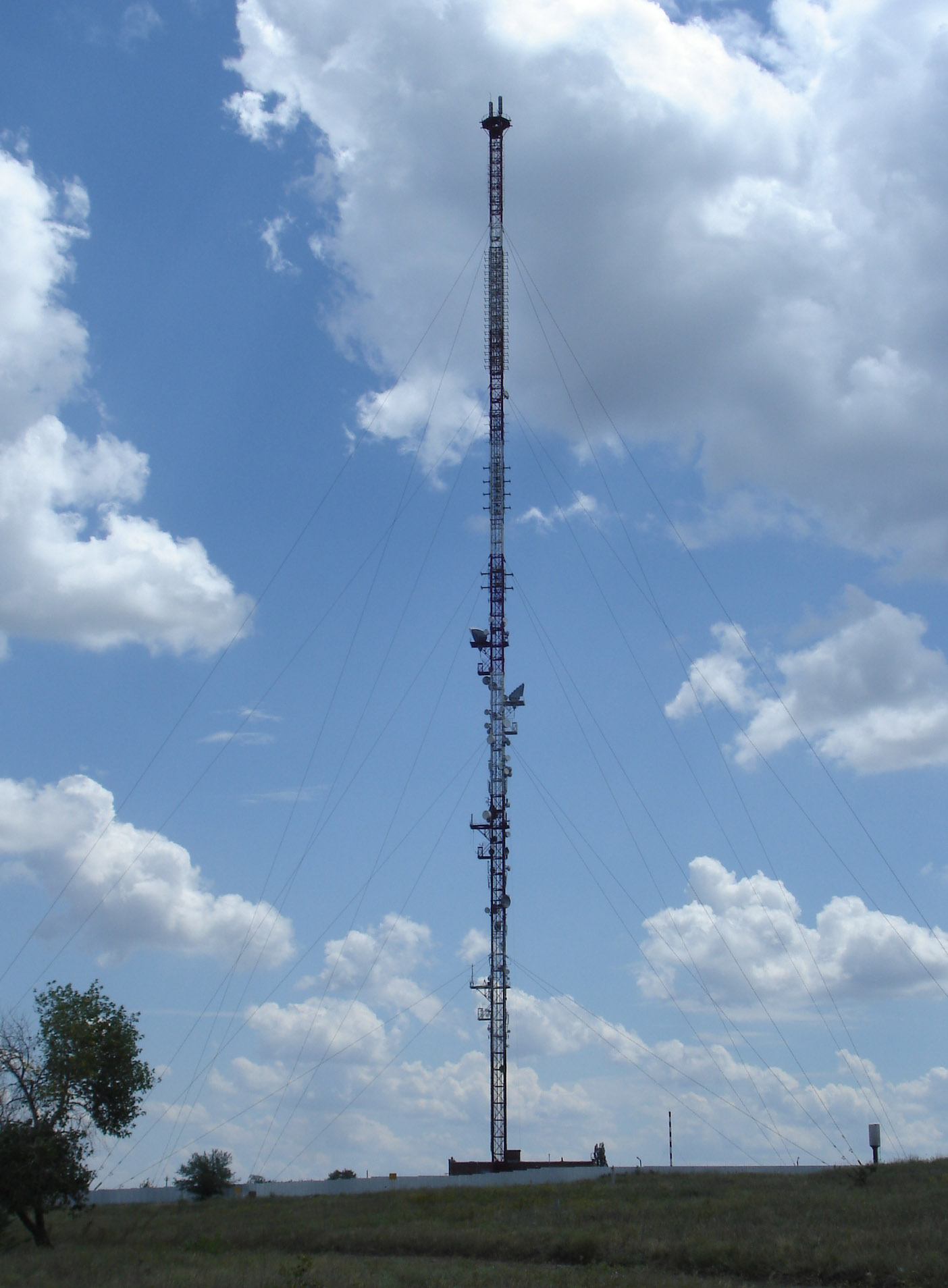

== See also ==
- Monument to railwaymen
