= Chertkovo =

Chertkovo (Russian: Чертково) is the name of several rural localities in Russia:

- Chertkovo, Penza Oblast, a selo in Grabovsky Selsoviet of Bessonovsky District of Penza Oblast
- Chertkovo, Rostov Oblast, a settlement in Chertkovskoye Rural Settlement of Chertkovsky District of Rostov Oblast
- Chertkovo, Vladimir Oblast, a village in Selivanovsky District of Vladimir Oblast
