= List of named passenger trains of Russia =

This article contains a list of named passenger trains in Russia.

== List ==
Russian name	Transliterated name	Name meaning	Railroad	Train endpoints	Train number	Operated	Note	Ref
Аврора	Avrora	Aurora	RŽD	Moscow Leningradsky – St.Petersburg Glavny	741/742, 743/744	1963–2010; 2024–present	Returned to service December 2024	?
Арктика	Arktika	Arctic	RŽD	Moscow Leningradsky – Murmansk	015А/016А	present		
Баргузин	Barguzin	Barguzin river	RŽD	Irkutsk – Zabaykalsk	321И/322И	present		
Белогорье	Belogorie	Belogorye	RŽD	Moscow Kursky – Belgorod	072В/071В	2004–present		
Белые ночи	Belye nochi	White nights	RŽD	St. Petersburg Ladozhsky – Vologda	617Я/618Я	present		
Волга	Volga	Volga river	RŽD	St.Petersburg Glavny – Nizhny Novgorod	059Г/059А	1976–present		
Волгоград	Volgograd	Volgograd	RŽD	Moscow Paveletsky – Volgograd	001Ж/001И	present		
Воронеж	Voronezh	Voronezh	RŽD	Moscow Paveletsky – Voronezh	025В/025Я	2001–present		
Вятка	Vyatka	Vyatka river	RŽD	Moscow Yaroslavsky – Kirov	031Г/032Г	present		
Гилюй	Gilyuy	Gilyuy river	RŽD	Blagoveshchensk – Tynda	081Э/081Ч	1994–present		
Демидовский экспресс	Demidovskiy express	P. G. Demidov express	RŽD	St. Petersburg Ladozhsky – Yekaterinburg	071Е/072Е	2003–present		
Дневной экспресс	Dnevnoy express	Daily Express	RŽD	Samara – Penza	109Й/110Й	present		
Енисей	Enisey	Yenisey river	RŽD	Moscow Yaroslavsky – Krasnoyarsk	055Ы/056Ы	1993–present		
Жигули	Zhiguli	Zhiguli mountains	RŽD	Moscow Kazansky – Samara	009Й/010Й	1965–present		
Ингушетия	Ingushetiya	Ingushetia	RŽD	Moscow Kazansky – Nazran	146Э/145С	2013–present		
Иртыш	Irtysh	Irtysh river	RŽD	Novosibirsk – Omsk	088Н/087Н	present		
Италмас	Italmas	globeflower	RŽD	Moscow Kazansky – Izhevsk	025Г/026Г	present		
Кузбасс	Kuzbass	Kuznetsk Basin	RŽD	Novosibirsk – Kemerovo	029Н/030Н	present		
Лев Толстой	Lev Tolstoy	Leo Tolstoy	VR Group, RŽD	Moscow Leningradsky – Helsinki	031А/032А	1975–present		
Лотос	Lotos	Lotus	RŽD	Moscow Paveletsky – Astrakhan	005Г/005Ж	present		
Марий Эл	Mariy El	Mari El	RŽD	Moscow Kazansky – Yoshkar Ola	058Э/058Г	1993–present		
Мордовия	Mordoviya	Mordovia	RŽD	Moscow Kazansky – Saransk	041Й/042Й	1995–present		
Нижегородец	Nizhegorodets	Nizhegorodian	RŽD	Moscow Kursky – Nizhny Novgorod	035Г/036Э	present		
Саратов	Saratov	Saratov	RŽD	Moscow Paveletsky – Saratov	009Г/009Ж	present		
Фирменный	Firmenniy	Deluxe train	RŽD	Nizhny Novgorod – Izhevsk	051Г/051Э	present		
Новокузнецк	Novokuznetsk	Novokuznetsk	RŽD	St. Petersburg Ladozhsky – Novokuznetsk	013Н/014Н	1996–present		
Обь	Ob	Ob river	RŽD	Novosibirsk – Novy Urengoy	125Н/125Е	present		
Океан	Okean	Ocean	RŽD	Vladivostok - Khabarovsk	005Э/006Э	2000–present		
Омич	Omich	"of Omsk"	RŽD	Omsk — Nizhnevartovsk	115Н/115Е	present		
Оренбуржье	Orenburzhie	Orenburg Oblast	RŽD	Moscow Kazansky – Orenburg	031Е/032Й	1977–present		
Карелия	Kareliya	Karelia	RŽD	Moscow Leningradsky – Petrozavodsk	017А/018А	1996-2007, 2012–present		
Поволжье	Povolzhye	Volga region	RŽD	St. Petersburg Moskovsky – Kazan	133Г/133А	present		
Полярная стрела	Polyarnaya strela	Polar Arrow	RŽD	Moscow Yaroslavsky – Labytnangi	022Я/021Н	2004–present		
Поморье	Pomorie	Pomorie region	RŽD	Moscow Yaroslavsky – Severodvinsk	116М/115Я	2013–present		
Поморье	Pomorie	Pomorie region	RŽD	Moscow Yaroslavsky – Arkhangelsk	118М/117Я	2013–present		
Приосколье	Prioskolie	Oskol river region	RŽD	Moscow Kursky – Stary Oskol	057Ч/057В	2005–present		
Псков	Pskov	Pskov	RŽD	Moscow Leningradsky – Pskov	010А/010Ч	present		
Россия	Rossiya	Russia	RŽD	Moscow Yaroslavsky – Vladivostok	002Щ/001М	1966–present	The longest single passenger train journey in the world	
Самара	Samara	Samara	RŽD	St. Petersburg Moskovsky – Samara	107Й/107Ж	2005–present		
Северная Пальмира	Severnaya Palmira	Northern Palmyra	RŽD	St. Petersburg Moskovsky – Adler	035А/036А (035В/036С)	2016–present		
Северный Урал	Severnyi Ural	Northern Ural	RŽD	Moscow Yaroslavsky – Serov	084М/084Е	1984–present		
Сура	Sura	Sura river	RŽD	Moscow Kazansky – Penza	051Й/052М	1966–present		
Сыктывкар	Syktyvkar	Syktyvkar	RŽD	Moscow Yaroslavsky – Syktyvkar	034М/034Я	2006–present		
Тамбов	Tambov	Tambov	RŽD	Moscow Paveletsky – Tambov	031Ч/031В	1994–present		
Томич	Tomich	"of Tomsk"	RŽD	Moscow Yaroslavsky – Tomsk-2	037Н/038Н	present		
Тюмень	Tyumen	Tyumen	RŽD	Moscow Kazansky – Nizhevartovsk	059Е/060У	present		
Ульяновск	Uliyanovsk	Ulyanovsk	RŽD	Moscow Kazansky – Ulyanovsk	021Й/022Й	1993–present		
Урал	Ural	Ural	RŽD	Kislovodsk – Yekaterinburg	045Е/045С	1964–present	Until 2009 operated on the Moscow – Yekaterinburg line.	
Чувашия	Chuvashiya	Chuvashia	RŽD	Moscow Kazansky – Cheboksary	053Ж/054Г	present		
Шексна	Sheksna	Sheksna river	RŽD	Moscow Yaroslavsky – Cherepovets	126Ч/126Я	present		
Южный Урал	Yuzhny Ural	South Ural	RŽD	Moscow Kazansky – Chelyabinsk	013У/014Е	1965–present		
Юность	Yunost	Youth	RŽD	Khabarovsk – Komsomolsk-on-Amur	667Э/667Ж	2011–present	Yunost (№ 023/024) previously operated on the Moscow-St. Petersburg line (–2009)	
Ямал	Yamal	Yamal	RŽD	Moscow Yaroslavsky – Novy Urengoi	011Е/012Я	2003–present		
Янтарь	Yantar	Amber	RŽD, BŽD	Moscow Belorussky – Minsk Main – Kaliningrad	029Ч/030Ч	1961–present		
Кавказ	Kavkaz	Caucasus	RŽD	Moscow Kazansky – Kislovodsk	003С/004М	2017–present		
Иван Паристый	Ivan Paristiy	Ivan Paristy	RŽD	Moscow Kiyevsky – Bryansk	737А/738А 739А/740А 741В/742В	1998–present	Named "Desna" until 2006 after the Desna river. Daily fast train, not categorized as "branded" (firmeny)	
Красная стрела	Krasnaya strela	Red Arrow	RŽD	Moscow Leningradsky – St. Petersburg Moskovsky (Saint Petersburg–Moscow railway)	002А/001А	1931–present	First and oldest named (firmeny) train in Russia.	
Смена-А. Бетанкур	Smena-A. Betankur	Smena magazine / A. de Betancourt	RŽD	Moscow Leningradsky – St. Petersburg Moskovsky (Saint Petersburg–Moscow railway)	025А/026А	1989–present		
Экспресс	Express	Express	RŽD	Moscow Leningradsky – St. Petersburg Moskovsky (Saint Petersburg–Moscow railway)	003А/004А	present		
Невский экспресс	Nevsky Express	Neva river	RŽD	Moscow Leningradsky – St. Petersburg Moskovsky (Saint Petersburg–Moscow railway)	747/748	2001–2008, 2010–present	Daily fast train, not categorized as "branded" (firmeny)	
Гранд Экспресс	Grand Express	Grand Express	private company	Moscow Leningradsky – St. Petersburg Moskovsky (Saint Petersburg–Moscow railway)	054Ч/053Ч	2005–present	First privately owned named train in Russia.	
Мегаполис	Megapolis	Megapolis	private company	Moscow Leningradsky – St. Petersburg Moskovsky (Saint Petersburg–Moscow railway)	019У/020У	2006–present		
Сапсан	Sapsan	Peregrine falcon	RŽD	Moscow Leningradsky – St. Petersburg Moskovsky (Saint Petersburg–Moscow railway)		2009–present	High-speed train	
Алле́гро	Allegro	Allegro (music)	Karelian Trains	Helsinki Central – St. Petersburg Finlyandsky	781М/782М, 783М/784М, 785М/786A, 787М/788М	2010–present	High-speed train	
Ласточка	Lastochka	Swallow	RŽD	St. Petersburg Moskovsky – Veliky Novgorod, Moscow – Nizhny Novgorod, Rosa Khutor – Krasnodar, Imeretinsky Kurort – Krasnodar, Maikop – Adler, Moscow – Smolensk, Krasnodar– Anapa, Krasnodar– Kislovodsk		present	High-speed train	
Стриж	Strizh	Swift	RŽD	Moscow – Nizhny Novgorod, Moscow – Berlin Ostbahnhof		present	High-speed train	
Славянский экспресс	Slavyansky Express		BČ	Moscow Belorussky – Brest		2006–2010 (Moscow – Minsk) 2011–present		
Таврия	Tavriya	Tavria	private company	Moscow Kazansky – Simferopol, St. Petersburg Moskovsky – Sevastopol	028Ч/028С 007А/008С	2019–present		
Татарстан	Tatarstan	Tatarstan	RŽD	Moscow Kazansky – Kazan	001Г/002Й	1993–present	Premium category since 2009	
Кубань	Kuban	Kuban	RŽD	Moscow Kazansky – Novorossiysk	030Й/030С	present	Premium category since 2009	
Ти́хий Дон	Tikhiy Don	And Quiet Flows the Don	RŽD	Moscow Kazansky – Rostov-on-Don	020С/019С	1966–present	Premium category since 2009	
Сочи	Sochi	Sochi	RŽD	Moscow Kazansky – Adler	102С/102М	1964–present	Premium category since 2009	
Московия	Moscovia	Muscovy	RŽD	Moscow Kazansky – Adler	104Ж/104В	2001–present	Premium category since 2010	
Текстильный край	Textil'ny krai	Textile Land	RŽD	St. Petersburg Moskovsky – Ivanovo	045Я/045А	2011–present		
Николаевский экспресс	Nikolaevsky Express	Nikolay II	RŽD	Moscow Leningradsky – St. Petersburg Moskovsky	005А/006А	2015–present		
Атаман Платов	Ataman Platov	Matvei Platov	RŽD	Rostov-on-Don – Adler	642С/642Ж	2009–present	Previously running on the Moscow – Rostov-on-Don line	
Тверской экспресс	Tverskoy Express	Tver	RŽD	St. Petersburg Moskovsky – Astrakhan	109Ж/109А	present		
Савва Мамонтов	Savva Mamontov	Savva Mamontov	RŽD	Moscow Yaroslavsky – Yaroslavl	105Я/106Я 103Я/104Я 101Я/102Я	present		
Балтийский экспресс	Baltisky Express	Baltic sea	RŽD	Moscow Leningradsky – Tallinn	034/033	present	International train	
	Baltija (Baltics)		RŽD, LDz	St. Petersburg Vitebsky – Riga		present	International train	
Белый аист	Bely Aist		BŽD	Minsk Main – Kyiv Main		present	International train	
	Bulgaria Express			Moscow Kiyevsky – Sofia		present	International train	
	Kazakhstan		RŽD, KTŽ	Saratov – Almaty		present	International train	
	Kirghizia		KTJ	Moscow Kazansky – Bishkek-2		present	International train	
	Latvijas Ekspresis (from Latvian: Latvian Express)		RŽD, LDz	Moscow Rizhsky – Riga		present	International train	
Летува	Lietuva	Lithuania	RŽD, BŽD, LG	Moscow Belorussky – Minsk Main – Vilnius		present	International train	
	Mayak	Lighthouse	RŽD, BŽD, UZ	St. Petersburg Vitebsky – Kyiv Main – Odesa		present	International train	
	Moldova		RŽD, UZ, CFM	Moscow (Kiyevsky) – Kyiv Main – Chişinău		present	International train	
	Odesa		RŽD, UZ	Moscow Kiyevsky – Kyiv Main – Odesa		present	International train	
	Moscow Express/Berlin		DB, PKP, BŽD, RŽD	Berlin Hauptbahnhof – Moscow Belorussky		present	International train	
	Polonez		RŽD, BŽD, PKP	Moscow Belorussky – Minsk Main – Warszawa Centralna		present	International train	
	Pridneprovie		RŽD, UZ	Moscow Kursky – Dnipro		present	International train	
	Sodruzhestvo	Commonwealth	RŽD, UZ, CFM	Moscow Kiyevsky – Kyiv (Main) – Chişinău		present	International train	
	Tajikistan		TDŽ	Moscow Kazansky – Dushanbe		present	International train	
	Uzbekistan		UTI	Moscow Kazansky – Tashkent		present	International train	
	Vltava			Moscow Belorussky – Minsk Main – Warszawa Centralna – Prague Main		present	International train	
Восток	Vostok	East	RŽD, CR	Moscow Yaroslavsky – Beijing Main		present	International train	
	Vostok-Zapad Express	East-West Express	RŽD, BŽD, PKP	Moscow Belorussky – Minsk Main – Warszawa Centralna		present	International train	
Юрмала	Yurmala	Jūrmala	RŽD, LDz	Moscow Rizhsky – Riga		present	International train	
Афанасий Никитин	Afanasiy Nikitin	Afanasy Nikitin	RŽD	037А/038А	1991–present			
Алтай	Altay	Altai	RŽD	Moscow Kazansky – Barnaul	036М/036Н	not named since 2011		
Байкал	Baikal	Lake Baikal	RŽD	St. Petersburg Moskovsky – Irkutsk		1964–2013		
Башкортостан	Bashkortostan	Bashkortostan	RŽD	Moscow Kazansky – Ufa	039Й/040Й	1965–2017		
	Belomorie		RŽD	Moscow (Yaroslavsky) – Arkhangelsk		present		
Белоруссия	Belorussia	Belarus	RŽD, BŽD	Moscow (Belorussky) – Minsk (Main)		present		
Буревестник	Burevestnik	Petrel	RŽD	Moscow (Kursky) – Nizhny Novgorod	153Г/154Г	discontinued since 2014		
	Chelyabinsky Express		RŽD	St. Petersburg (Ladozhsky) – Chelyabinsk		present		
Черноморец	Chernomorets	Blask Sea	RŽD	St. Petersburg Moskovsky – Novorossiysk		discontinued since 2019		
Даурия	Dauriya	Transbaikal	RŽD	Zabaikalsk – Chita	650Ч/649Ч	discontinued		
Две столицы	Dve stolitsy	Two Capitals	RŽD	Moscow Leningradsky – St. Petersburg Moskovsky	063А/064А	discontinued		
	Il'men'		RŽD	Moscow (Leningradsky) – Veliky Novgorod		present		
Кама	Kama	Kama river	RŽD	Moscow Yaroslavsky – Perm	017Е/018Е	1967–2010, 2016–2019		
	Kyiv		RŽD, UZ	Moscow (Kiyevsky) – Kyiv (Main)		discontinued since 2014	International train	
	Kostroma		RŽD	Moscow (Yaroslavsky) – Kostroma		present		
Красный Яр	Krasniy Yar	Krasnoyarsk	RŽD	Novosibirsk – Krasnoyarsk	085Ы/086Ы	2006–discontinued		
	Krym	Crimea	RŽD, UZ	Moscow (Kursky) – Kharkov – Simferopol		discontinued since 2014		
Липецк	Lipetsk		RŽD	Moscow Paveletsky – Lipetsk	029В/029М	discontinued		
	Lybid'		RŽD, BŽD, UZ	St. Petersburg (Vitebsky) – Kyiv (Main)		present		
Магнитка	Magnitka	Magnitogorsk Iron and Steel Works	RŽD	Moscow Kazansky – Magnitogorsk		discontinued since 2010		
Малахит	Malahit	Malachite	RŽD	Moscow Yaroslavsky – Nizhny Tagil		1976–2017		
	Minsk		RŽD, BŽD	Moscow (Belorussky) – Minsk (Main)		present		
	Neman		BŽD	Moscow (Belorussky) – Grodno		present		
	Nikolay Konaryov		RŽD, UZ	Moscow Kursky – Kharkov		discontinued since 2019		
Николай Никольский	Nikolay Nikolskiy	Nikolay Porfirievich Nikolsky	RŽD	Novosibirsk – Krasnoyarsk	083Н/084Н	discontinued		
	Osetia		RŽD	Moscow (Kazansky) – Rostov-on-Don – Vladikavkaz		present		
	Peresvet		RŽD	St. Petersburg (Moskovsky) – Moscow (Kursky) – Bryansk		present		
Репин	Repin	Ilya Repin	VR Group	Helsinki Central – St. Petersburg Finlyandsky		1974–2010	International train.	
Рыбинск	Rybinsk	Rybinsk	RŽD	Moscow Belorussky – Rybinsk	601Я/602Я	not named since 2012		
Саяны	Sayany	Sayan Mountains	RŽD	Moscow Yaroslavsky – Abakan		present		
	Serebryanye Klyuchi	Silver Springs	RŽD	Moscow (Kazansky) – Sergach		present		
	Seym		RŽD	Moscow (Kursky) – Lgov		present		
Сибелиус	Sibelius	Jean Sibelius	VR Group	Helsinki (Central) – St. Petersburg (Finlyandsky)		1992–2010	International train	
Сибиряк	Sibirjak	Siberian	DB, PKP, BŽD, RŽD, KTŽ	Berlin Hauptbahnhof – Adler; Berlin Hauptbahnhof – Nur-Sultan; Berlin Hauptbahnhof – Chelyabinsk; Berlin Hauptbahnhof – Kazan; Berlin Hauptbahnhof – Moscow Belorussky; Berlin Hauptbahnhof – Novosibirsk; Berlin Hauptbahnhof – St. Petersburg Vitebsky; Berlin Hauptbahnhof – Ufa		discontinued since 2013		
Сибиряк	Sibiryak	Siberian	RŽD	Moscow Yaroslavsky – Novosibirsk	025Н/026Н	discontinued since 2014		
	Slava	Glory	RŽD	St. Petersburg (Moskovsky) – Moscow (Kursky) – Volgograd		present		
Смоленск	Smolensk	Smolensk	RŽD	Moscow Belorussky – Smolensk	033Ж/034Ж	present		
Соловей	Solovey	Nightingale	RŽD	St. Petersburg (Moskovsky) – Moscow (Kursky) – Kursk		discontinued since 2014		
	Sozh		RŽD, BŽD	Moscow (Belorussky) – Gomel		present		
Столичный экспресс	Stolichny Express	Capital Express	RŽD, UZ	Moscow Kiyevsky – Kyiv Main	001Я/002Л	2005–2015		
	Sumy		RŽD, UZ	Moscow (Kiyevsky) – Sumy		operates as add-on through-coaches to the train Kharkiv-Moscow		
	Svisloch		RŽD, BŽD	Moscow (Belorussky) – Minsk (Main)		present		
	Tissa		RŽD, UZ	Moscow (Kiyevsky) – Kyiv (Main) – Uzhhorod (Central)		discontinued since 2014		
Троянда Донбасу	Troyanda Donbasu	The Rose of Donbas	RŽD, UZ	Moscow (Kursky) – Donetsk		discontinued since 2014 due to war in Donbas	International train. Previously named "Donbas".	
Тургенев	Turgenev	Ivan Turgenev	RŽD	Moscow Kursky – Oryol; Moscow Kursky – Simferopol	603М/604М; 029/030	2006–2014		
	Ugolyok		RŽD, UZ	Moscow (Kursky) – Donetsk		discontinued		
	Ukraine		RŽD, UZ	Moscow (Kiyevsky) – Kyiv (Main)		discontinued		
Вологодские зори	Vologodskie zori	Vologda Sunrises	RŽD	Moscow Yaroslavsky – Vologda	059Я/060Я	1978–2014		
	Volyn		RŽD, UZ	Moscow (Kiyevsky) – Kyiv (Main) – Kovel		since 2014 operates as a regular train		
Эльбрус	Elbrus	Mount Elbrus	RŽD	Moscow Kazansky – Nalchik	061С/062Ч	discontinued		
	Yarmarka	Fair	RŽD	Moscow (Kazansky) – Nizhny Novgorod		present		
	Yugra	Yugra	RŽD	Moscow (Yaroslavsky) – Yekaterinburg – Nizhnevartovsk		present		
	Zauralie	Transurals	RŽD	Moscow (Kazansky) – Petropavlovsk		present		
	Zvezda	Star	RŽD, BŽD	St. Petersburg (Vitebsky) – Minsk (Main)		present		

== Gallery ==
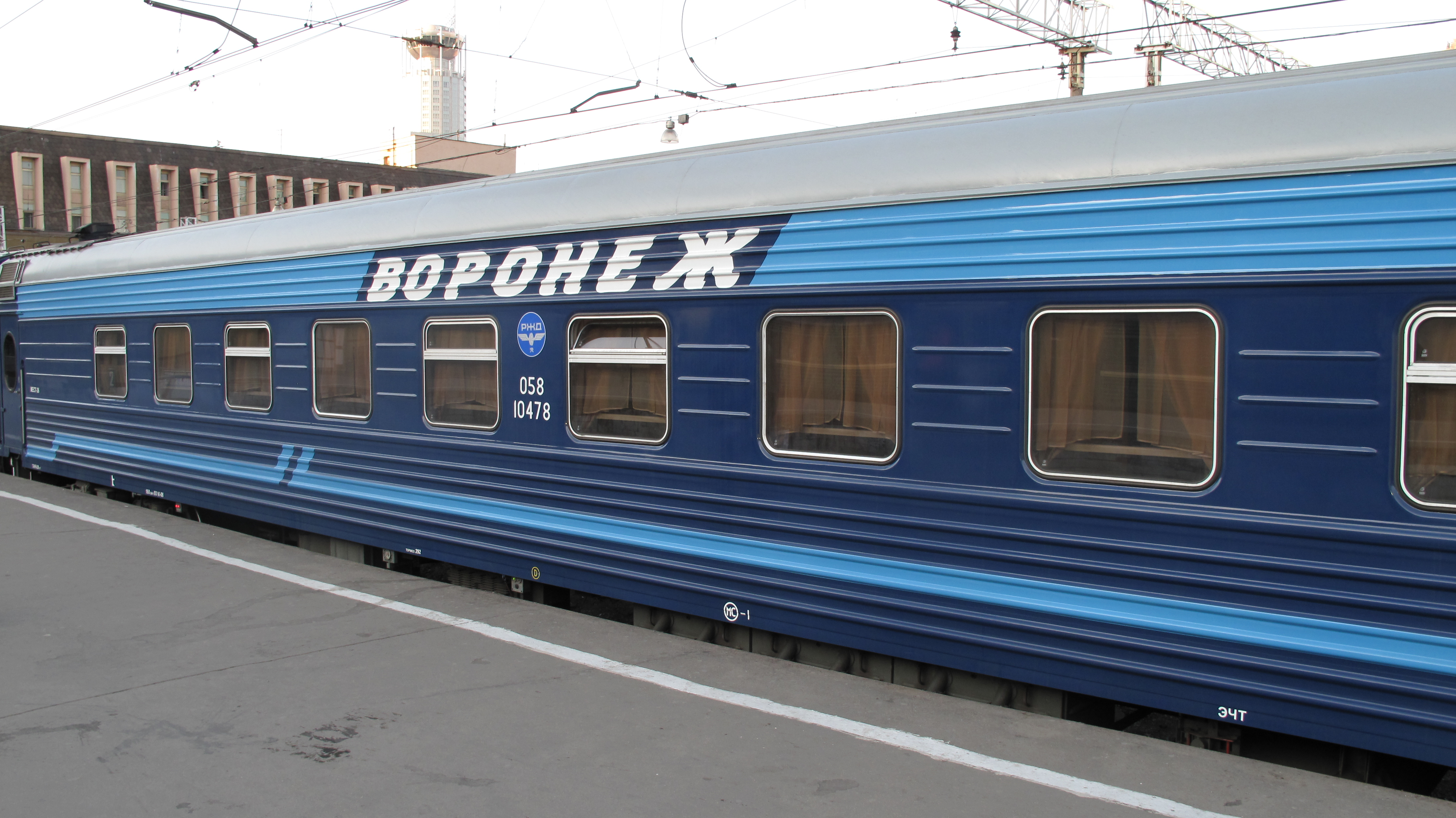
Воронеж (Voronezh) train

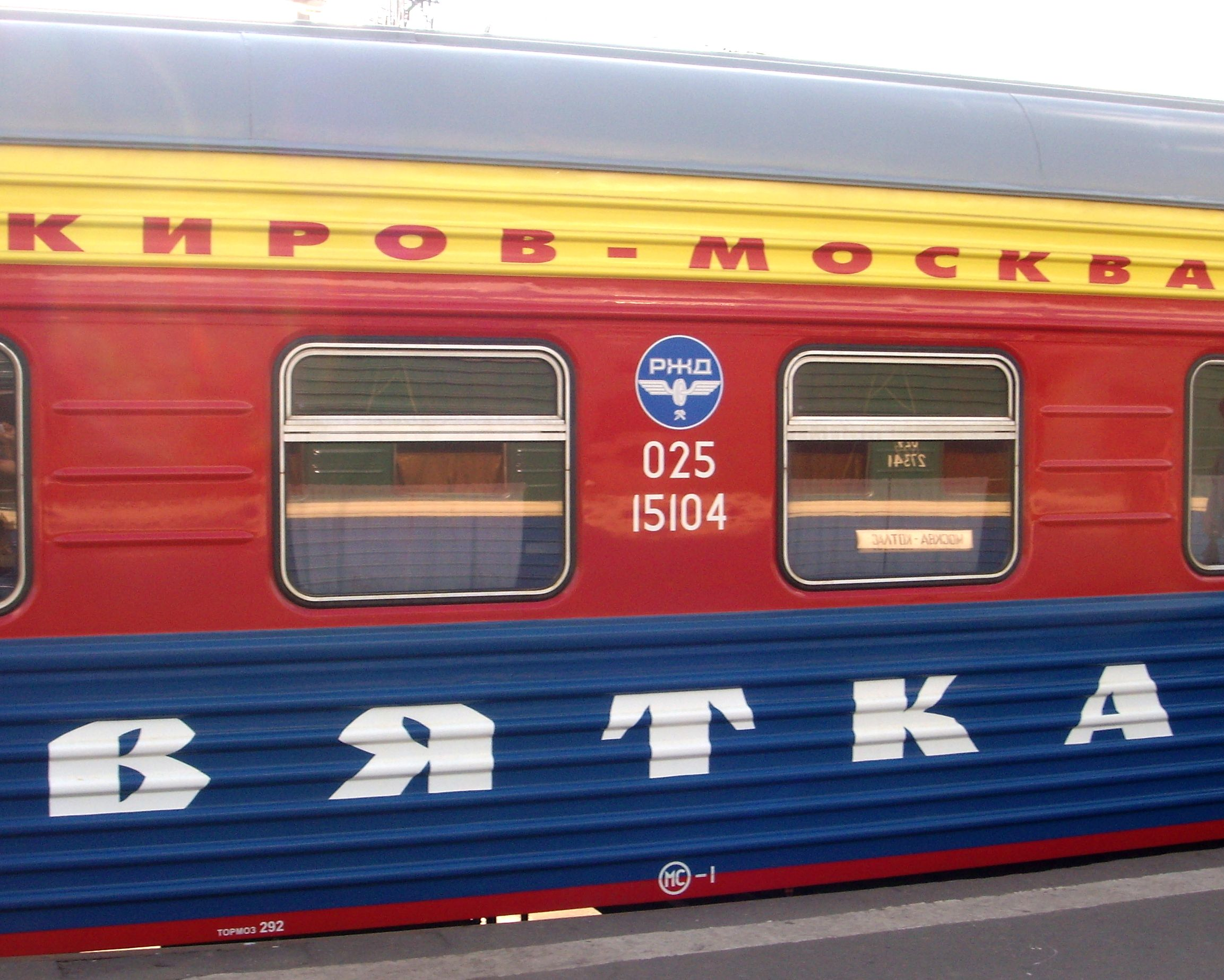
Вятка (Vyatka) train

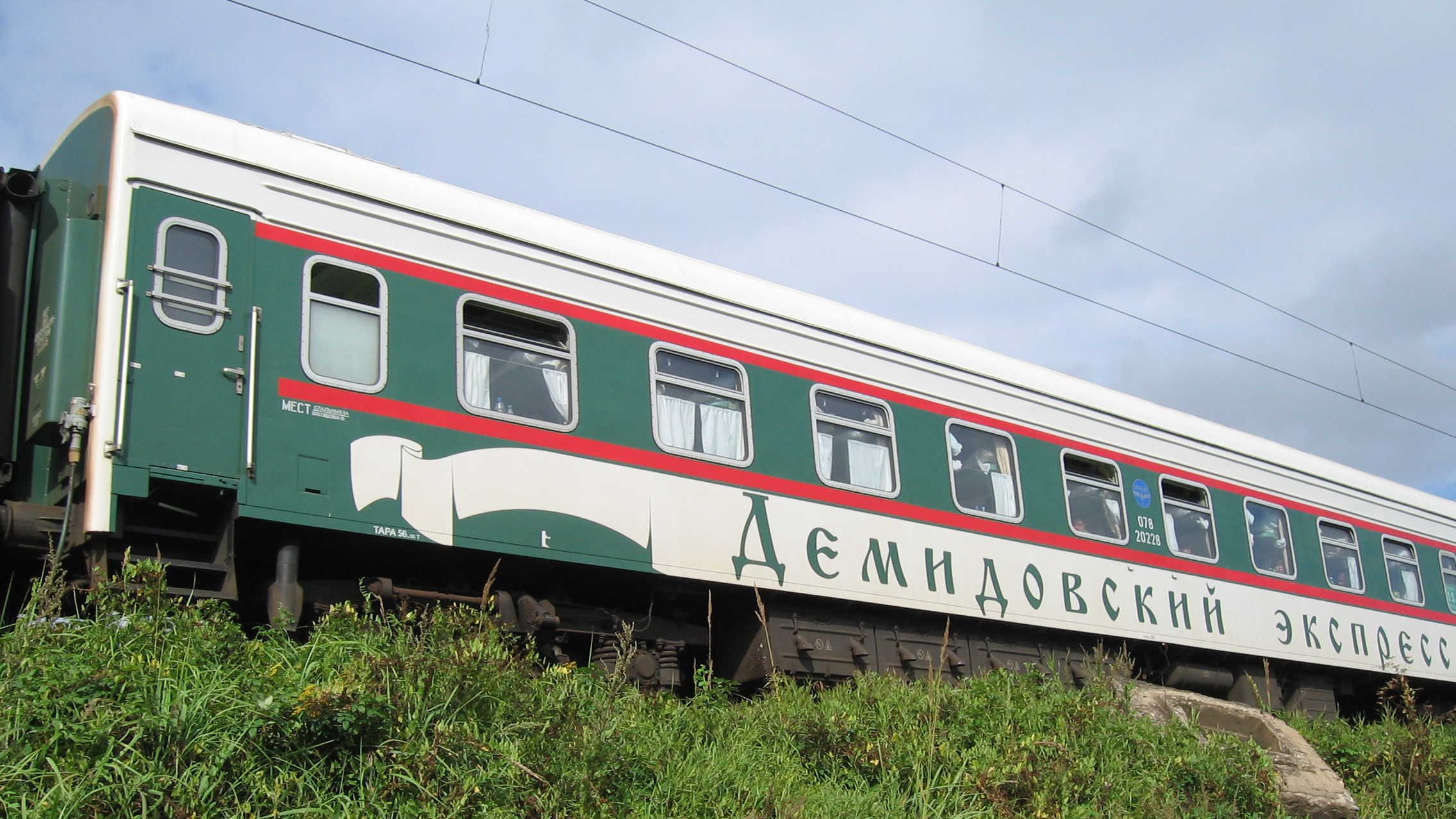
Демидовский экспресс (Demidovskiy express) train

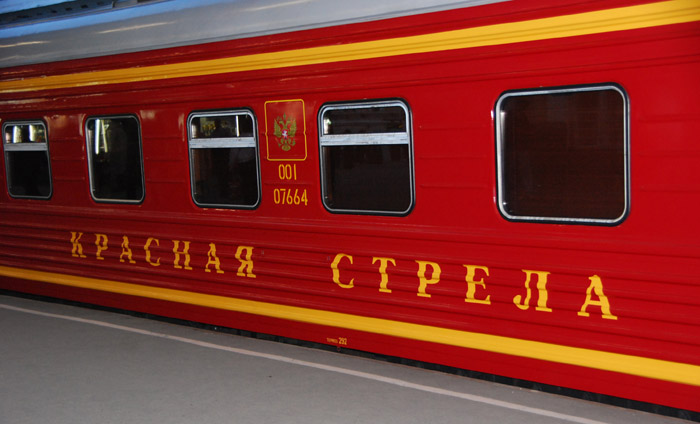
Красная стрела (Krasnaya strela) train

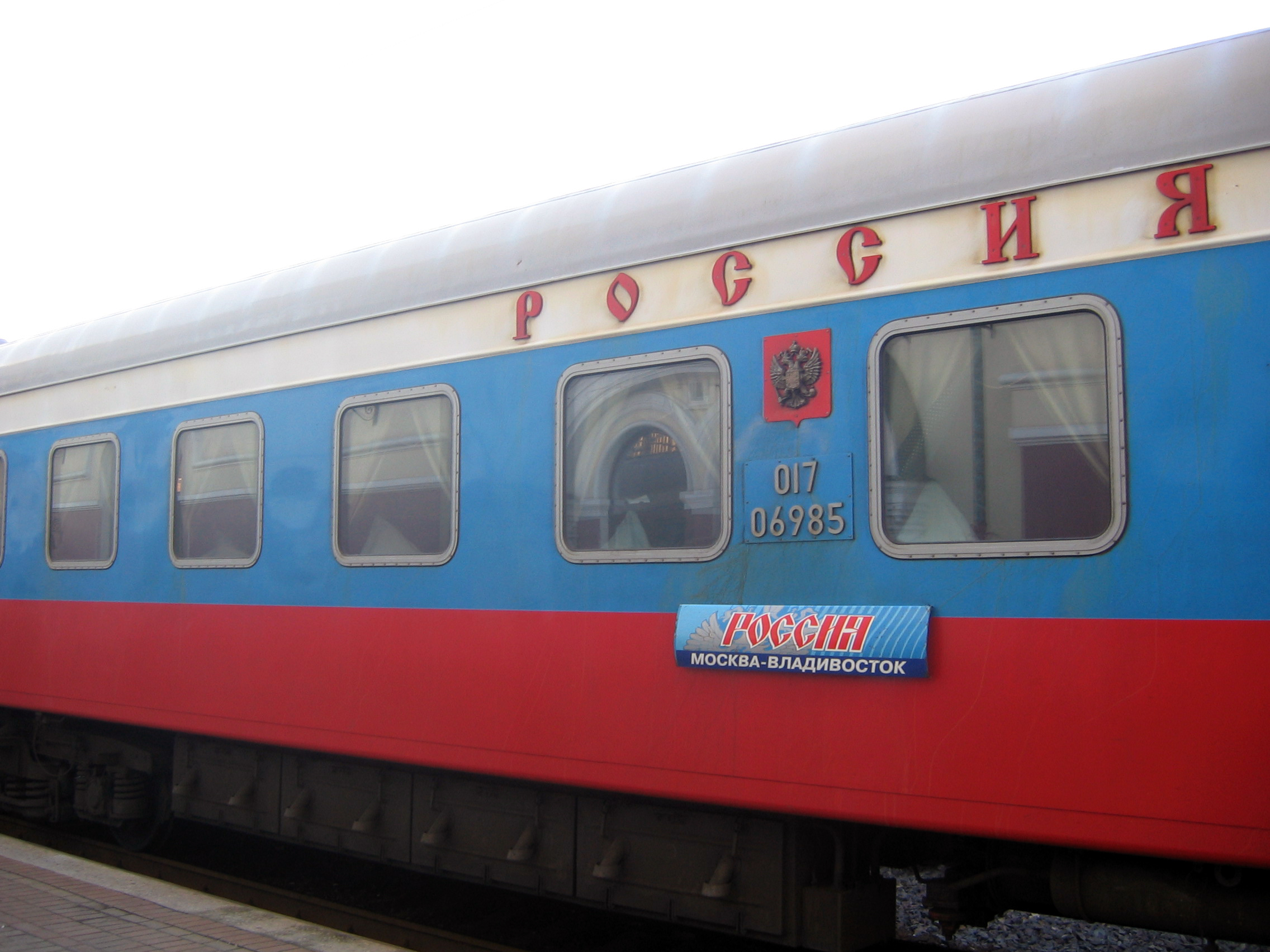
Россия (Rossiya) train

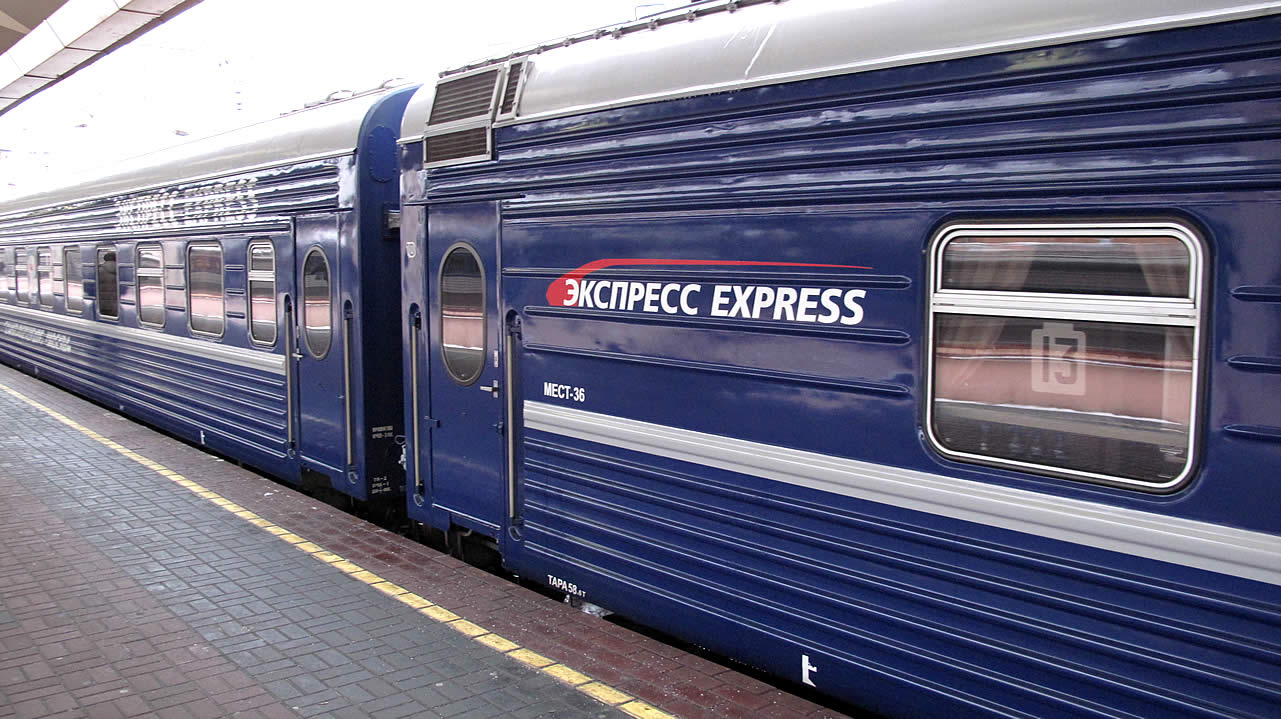
Экспресс (Express) train

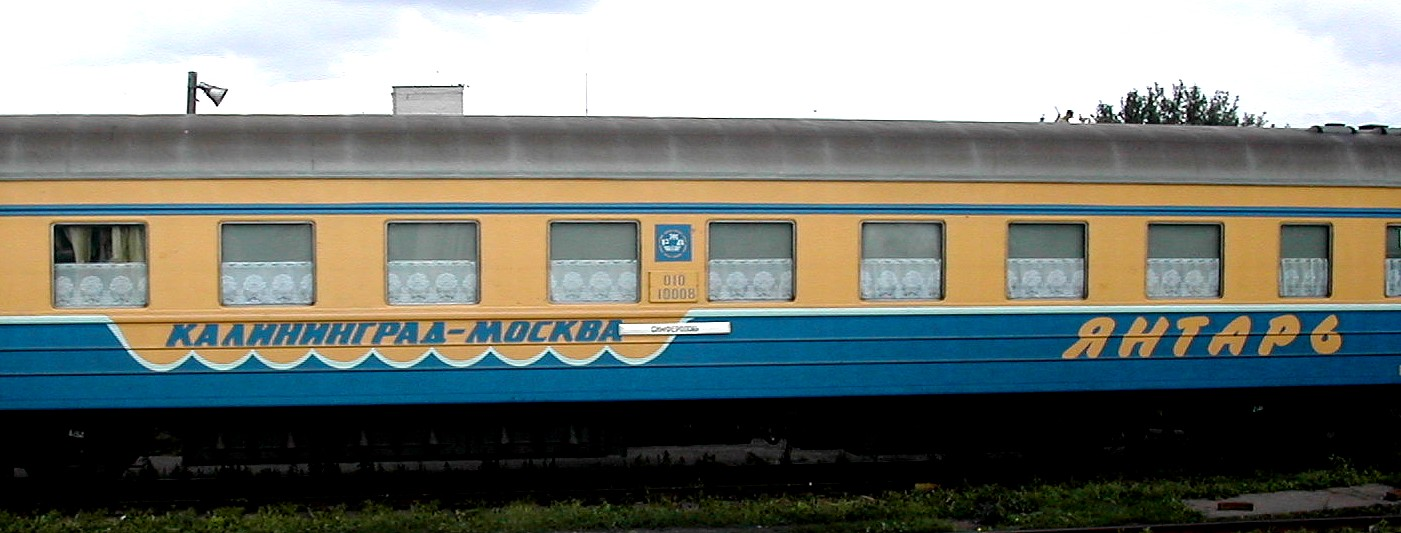
Янтарь (Yantar) train

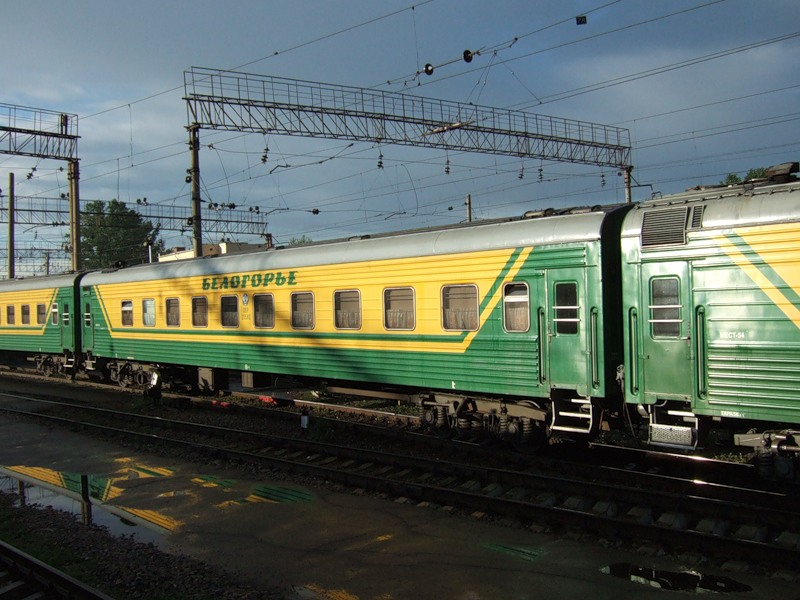
Белогорье (Belogorie) train

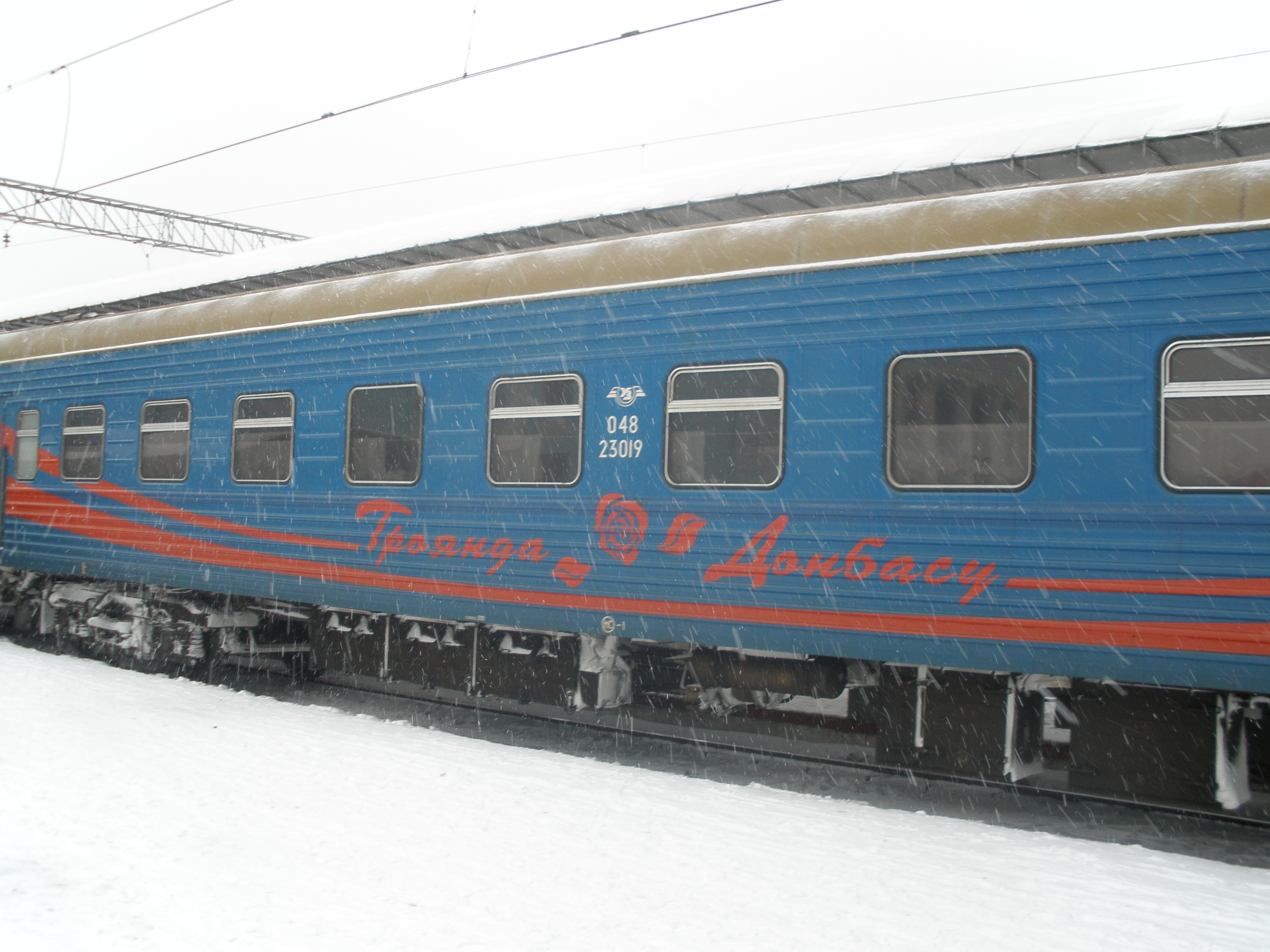
Now defunct Троянда Донбасу (Troyanda Donbasu) train in 2008
