= Novobelaya =

Novobelaya Новобелая
- Selo
- Location within Voronezh Oblast Location within Russia
- Coordinates: 49°49′N 39°16′E
- Country: Russia
- Region: Voronezh Oblast
- District: Kantemirovsky District
- Time zone: UTC+3:00

Novobelaya (Russian: Новобелая) is a rural locality (a selo) and the administrative center of Novobelyanskoye Rural Settlement, Kantemirovsky District, Voronezh Oblast, Russia. In the 19th century the village was part of Novobelyanskaya volost, Bogucharsky Uyezd, Voronezh Governorate. The population was 1,315 as of 2018. There are 11 streets.

== Geography ==
Novobelaya is located 63 km northwest of Kantemirovka (the district's administrative centre) by road. Volokonovka is the nearest rural locality.
