= Kovalenkovsky =

Kovalenkovsky Коваленковский
- Settlement
- Location within Voronezh Oblast Location within Russia
- Coordinates: 49°43′N 40°14′E
- Country: Russia
- Region: Voronezh Oblast
- District: Kantemirovsky District
- Time zone: UTC+3:00

Kovalenkovsky (Russian: Коваленковский) is a rural locality (a settlement) in Osikovskoye Rural Settlement, Kantemirovsky District, Voronezh Oblast, Russia. The population was 90 as of 2010.

== Geography ==
Kovalenkovsky is located 36 km east of Kantemirovka (the district's administrative centre) by road. Kuznetsovsky is the nearest rural locality.
