= Mikhail Chertkov =

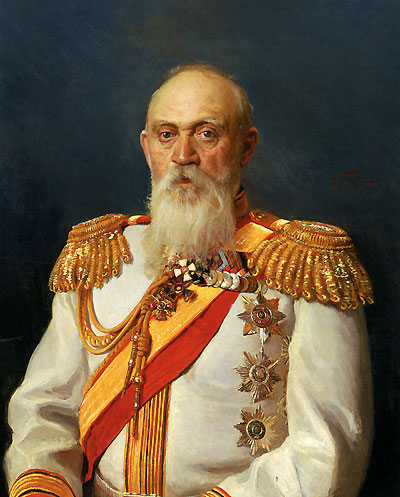
- Portrait by Aleksandr Makovsky, 1897
- Born: 14 August 1829
- Died: 19 October 1905 (aged 76)
- Military career
- Allegiance: Russian Empire
- Rank: General of the Cavalry
- Commands: Kiev Military District; Governor-general of Warsaw

Mikhail Ivanovich Chertkov (Polish: Michaił Iwanowicz Czertkow, Russian: Михаил Иванович Чертков) (St. Petersburg, August 14, 1829 – Paris, October 19, 1905) was a Russian Imperial general of the cavalry and statesman who served as Governor-General of Warsaw in Poland between 1900 and 1905.

He joined the Tsarist Army in December 1851 a lieutenant and he took part in the Crimean War. In 1859–1860, he fought against insurgents in the Caucasus.

In 1861–1864 he was governor and military commander of the Voronezh Governorate and between 1864 and 1866 of the Volhynian Governorate. In 1867–1868 he was deputy governor-general of Vilna, Kaunas, Grodno, and Minsk, and the chief of the Vitebsk and Mogilev provinces.

In 1868 he received the rank of lieutenant general. In 1868-74 he was the military ataman of the Don Army. In 1877, during the Russo-Turkish War of 1877–78, he accompanied Emperor Alexander II to Chisinau. Between April 16, 1878, and January 13, 1881, he was General Governor and Military Governor of the Southwestern Krai and the Kiev Military District.

From January 1881 he was a member of the State Council and from October to November 1881, he was a member of the Special Meeting for the Reorganization of Military Administration.

From March 1901 until the end of his life he was Governor-General of Warsaw and Commander of the Warsaw Military District.
In September 1902, he received the highest Prussian Award, the Order of the Black Eagle, when he visited Posen for German army maneuvers.

He died at the age of 76.
The Chertkovsky District, Chertkovo village and Chertkovo railway station were named after him.

== Sources ==
- Tchertkoff memorial
- KV.COM (in Russian)
- DLIB.RSL (in Russian)
