= Kasyanovka =

Kasyanovka Касьяновка
- Selo
- Location within Voronezh Oblast Location within Russia
- Coordinates: 49°44′N 39°47′E
- Country: Russia
- Region: Voronezh Oblast
- District: Kantemirovsky District
- Time zone: UTC+3:00

Kasyanovka (Russian: Касьяновка) is a rural locality (a selo) in Zhuravskoye Rural Settlement, Kantemirovsky District, Voronezh Oblast, Russia. The population was 706 as of 2010. There are 3 streets.

== Geography ==
Kasyanovka is located 8 km northwest of Kantemirovka (the district's administrative centre) by road. Novomarkovka is the nearest rural locality.
