= Kazimirovka =

Kazimirovka Казимировка
- Khutor
- Location within Voronezh Oblast Location within Russia
- Coordinates: 49°43′N 39°46′E
- Country: Russia
- Region: Voronezh Oblast
- District: Kantemirovsky District
- Time zone: UTC+3:00

Kazimirovka (Russian: Казимировка) is a rural locality (a khutor) in Zhuravskoye Rural Settlement, Kantemirovsky District, Voronezh Oblast, Russia. The population was 160 as of 2010.

== Geography ==
Kazimirovka is located 8 km northwest of Kantemirovka (the district's administrative centre) by road. Kasyanovka is the nearest rural locality.
