= Kolesnikovka =

Kolesnikovka Колесниковка
- Selo
- Location within Voronezh Oblast Location within Russia
- Coordinates: 49°40′N 40°06′E
- Country: Russia
- Region: Voronezh Oblast
- District: Kantemirovsky District
- Time zone: UTC+3:00

Kolesnikovka (Russian: Колесниковка) is a rural locality (a selo) in Zaytsevskoye Rural Settlement, Kantemirovsky District, Voronezh Oblast, Russia. The population was 55 as of 2010.

== Geography ==
Kolesnikovka is located 28 km southeast of Kantemirovka (the district's administrative centre) by road. Garmashevka is the nearest rural locality.
