= South Eastern Railway (Russia) =

Russian transport company

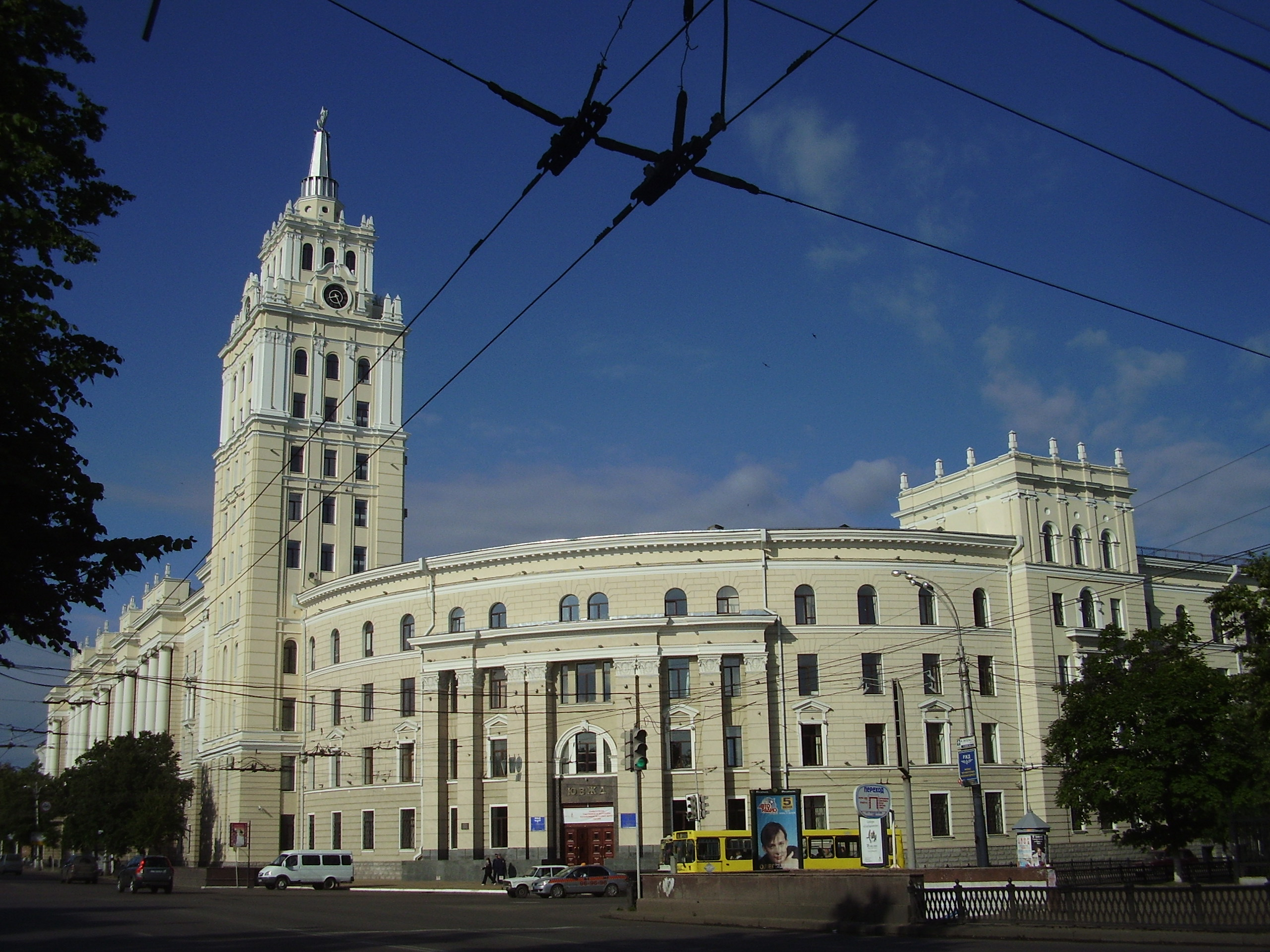
The main office in Voronezh

The Yugo-Vostochnaya Railway (Юго-Восточная железная дорога; "Southeastern Railway") is a subsidiary of the Russian Railways headquartered in Voronezh. Despite its name, the network operates the railways in the southwest of Russia. Its area of operation comprises Voronezh, Belgorod, Kursk, Ryazan, Tambov, Lipetsk, and Penza regions.

The railway route length was 3,648 kilometres (2,267 mi) in 1991, which included 257 stations and 13 locomotive yards.

== History ==
The railway network originated in the late 19th century as the Moscow-Ryazan Railway Association, a private enterprise set up by two Baltic Germans, Paul von Derwies and Karl Otto Georg von Meck. The first line opened in 1866; it connects Ryazan and Michurinsk. It was extended toward Voronezh, Tsaritsyn, Saratov, and Rostov-on-Don in 1871. The Balashov-Kharkov line was completed in 1890. After the Russian Revolution, the Southeastern Railways were nationalized by the Bolsheviks.

In 1987 the line in Rostov Oblast from Chertkovo to Zverevo was transferred from the South Eastern Railway to the North Caucasus Railway, with the new connection between the two railways being just north of Chertkovo railway station.

A 37-kilometre section of the rail line between Chertkovo and Gartmashevka in the Kantemirovsky District of Voronezh Oblast to the north passed through Ukraine's Luhansk Oblast, with Russian Railways leasing the rail infrastructure from a Ukrainian village council. Construction of a bypass entirely within Russia, from Zhuravka in the Kantemirovsky District in the north to Millerovo (on the North Caucasus Railway) in the south, began in 2015. It became operational in August 2017. It has 122.5 km double-track, 25 kV 50 Hz, maximum speed of 160 km/h, cost 56 billion rubles. On 11 December 2017, Russian Railways switched all long-distance trains to the new line to bypass Ukraine. The South Eastern Railway now connects to the North Caucasus Railway just north of Sokhranovka in Chertkovsky District.
