= Kulikovka, Voronezh Oblast =

Kulikovka Куликовка
- Selo
- Location within Voronezh Oblast Location within Russia
- Coordinates: 49°50′N 39°30′E
- Country: Russia
- Region: Voronezh Oblast
- District: Kantemirovsky District
- Time zone: UTC+3:00

Kulikovka (Russian: Куликовка) is a rural locality (a selo) in Mikhaylovskoye Rural Settlement, Kantemirovsky District, Voronezh Oblast, Russia. The population was 928 as of 2010. There are 8 streets.

== Geography ==
Kulikovka is located 42 km northwest of Kantemirovka (the district's administrative centre) by road. Bondarevo is the nearest rural locality.
