= Tikhiy Don (train) =

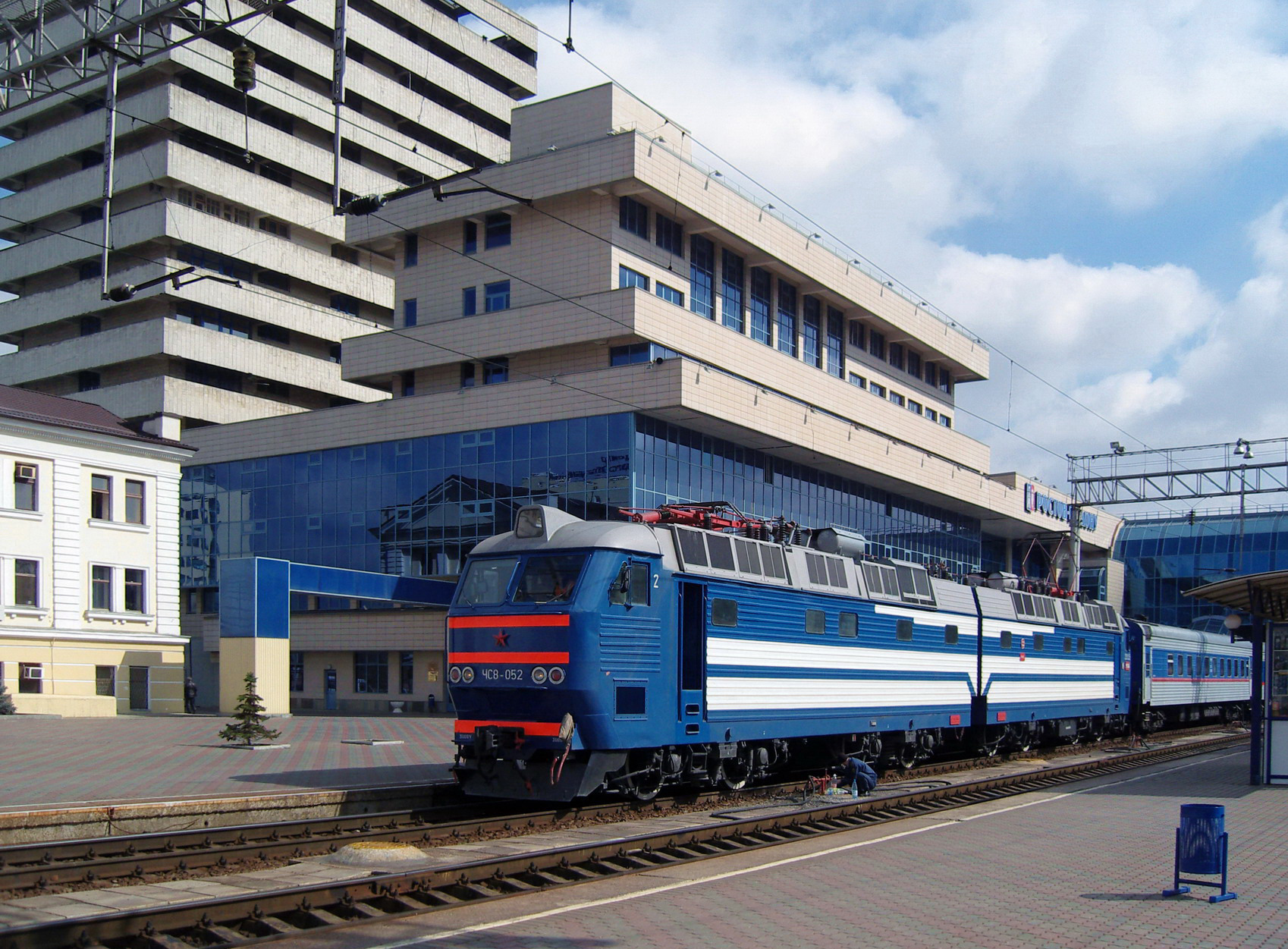
- The Tikhiy Don at Rostov-Glavny railway station, Rostov-on-Don.

Overview
- Service type: Inter-city rail
- Locale: Russia
- First service: January 1966
- Current operator: Russian Railways

Route
- Termini: Moscow Kazansky; Rostov-Glavny
- Stops: 12
- Distance travelled: 1,223 kilometres (760 mi)
- Average journey time: 16 h 22 m

Technical
- Track owners: North Caucasus Railway; South Eastern Railway; Moscow Railway
Route map

Tikhiy Don (Russian: Ти́хий Дон, lit. 'Quiet Don') is a Russian sleeper train connecting Rostov-on-Don and Moscow.

== General ==
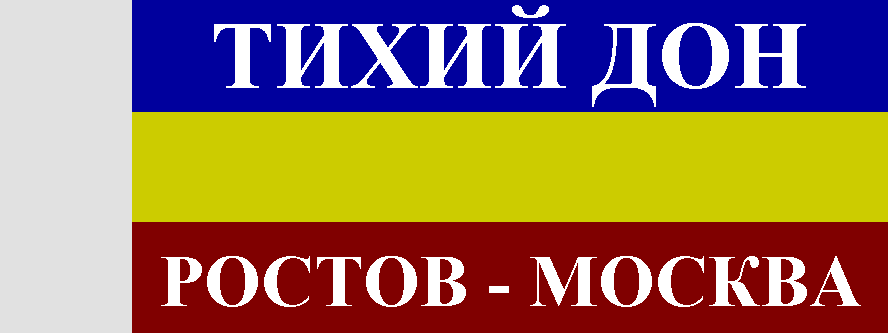
Tikhiy Don train banner

The Tikhiy Don runs from the Rostov-Glavny station in Rostov-on-Don to the Kazansky Rail Station in Moscow. It began its first regular service in January 1966. The total distance is 1,223 kilometres (760 mi), and it takes about eighteen hours to travel in one direction. The train banner is similar to the flag of Rostov Oblast.

== Stations ==
- Novocherkassk
- Shakhtnaya
- Likhaya
- Kamenskaya
- Millerovo
- Chertkovo
- Rossosh
- Liski
- Voronezh
- Gryazi
- Michurinsk
- Ryazan

Until June 1, 2009, the train Tikhiy Don operated passenger transportation together with the train Ataman Platov, named after the Russian Cossack general Matvei Platov.

== See also ==
- North Caucasus Railway
- Rostov-on-Don
- And Quiet Flows the Don
