= Milove =

Urban locality in Luhansk Oblast, Ukraine

Milove Мілове Меловое
- Rural settlement
- Location of Milove in Luhansk Oblast Location of Milove in Ukraine
- Coordinates: 49°22′40″N 40°07′50″E
- Country: Ukraine
- Oblast: Luhansk Oblast
- Raion: Starobilsk Raion
- Hromada: Milove settlement hromada
- Area: 605 km^{2} (234 sq mi)
- Population (2022): 5,680

Milove (Ukrainian: Мілове; Russian: Меловое, romanized: Melovoye) is the easternmost rural settlement the nominal administrative center of Milove settlement hromada in the Starobilsk Raion of Luhansk Oblast in eastern Ukraine. Population: 5,680 (2022 estimate). Prior to 2020, it was the administrative centre of the former Milove Raion. The town is currently occupied by Russian troops.

The town is adjacent to the Russian town of Chertkovo in Rostov Oblast. Its train station used to be on the Russian side of the border at Chertkovo railway station.

== Etymology ==
The name of the settlement is derived from the name of the Milova River, which name is derived from Russian name of the river - Меловая, which literally means "Chalky". The river is so named because there are chalk layers in a high ridge in the area of the river's source.

== Geography ==
It is located on the border with Russia. The line of the North Caucasian Railway divides it into two parts. On the Russian side there is the Chertkovo settlement. The railway station is located on the other side of the railroad, in Russia. There was a border control point Milove-Chertkovo on the border with Russia.

== History ==
After the construction of the Voronezh–Rostov railroad was completed in 1872, the khutir of Milove emerged near Chertkovo station as a small settlement in the Markovka Volost of the Starobelsky Uyezd in the Kharkov Governorate of the Russian Empire. Soviet rule was established there in January 1918, and in 1938 the settlement received the status of an urban-type settlement. During World War II, Milove was occupied by German forces from July 1942 to January 16, 1943, serving as an entrenched stronghold, and later became a Soviet stronghold during the Battle of Kursk. The hostilities and the German occupation caused 56.6 million rubles in damage, with the buildings of the collective farm and the MTS, the mill, the House of Culture, the library, the school, the nursery, the printing house, and half of all houses completely destroyed or burned down, after which reconstruction began.

In 1948, a tree nursery was established on the outskirts of the settlement. By 1953, Milove had a butter factory, a secondary school, a House of Culture, and a library, and in January 1959 its population reached 4,592 people (1,964 men and 2,628 women). The Starobilsk Veterinary College was transferred to Milove in 1964. In 1972, to commemorate its liberation from Nazi occupation, a museum dedicated to this history was opened, and the monument "Ukraine to the Liberators" was installed. By 1973, the settlement hosted a butter factory, the veterinary college, and both a historical and a local history museum.

In 1980, with a population of 5.5 thousand people, Milove had a pilot plant producing vegetable fats and proteins, a rayon agricultural machinery enterprise, a consumer services combine, two secondary schools, a music school, a sports school, a hospital, a House of Culture, two libraries, and a museum of geology. In January 1989, the population reached 5,921 people (2,700 men and 3,221 women).

After Ukraine declared independence, Milove found itself on the state border with Russia, where the customs post “Milove” was established under the responsibility of the Luhansk border patrol guard of the Eastern Regional Department of the State Border Guard Service of Ukraine. The settlements of Milove (Ukraine) and Chertkovo (Russia) are divided by Friendship of Peoples Street, which stretches about three kilometers and also functions as the state border. Nearly 500 Ukrainian and Russian residents live along this street. On the Russian side are the Chertkovsky elevator, the railroad station, and a meat processing plant, while the Ukrainian side contains the Milove Refined Oils Plant (no longer in operation), an energy company, and a large market square. From 2004 to 2013, Milove hosted the annual international festival of modern and traditional Ukrainian and Russian songs “Friendship Street”, during which the border was de facto open.

In May 1995, the Cabinet of Ministers of Ukraine approved the privatization of the local repair and transport enterprise, followed in July 1995 by the privatization of the raion agricultural machinery and raion agricultural chemistry enterprises. At the outbreak of the war in Donbas, Milove was not heavily affected, though on November 12, 2014, a Ukrainian border guard office was hit with a grenade launcher, causing no casualties. Rising political tensions led to the installation of security cameras on the Russian side of the border and the construction of a fence on the Ukrainian side. On November 27, 2015, two Russian servicemen were detained in the settlement and later exchanged back to Russian authorities.

Milove was occupied by Russian forces on February 24, 2022, during the Russian invasion of Ukraine. It is currently administered as part of the Lugansk People's Republic of Russia.

== Demographics ==
As of Ukraine's national census in 2001, Milove had a population of 5,611 people. The linguistic structure of the town is diverse, since also a significant share of the ethnic Ukrainian population living in Milove speaks the Russian language natively. The exact linguistic composition of the settlement was as follows:

Native languages in Milove
	percent
Ukrainian	57.7%
Russian	40.1%
Armenian	1.5%
Belarusian	0.2%
others	0.5%

== Cityscape ==
- Memorial Complex "Ukraine to the Liberators"

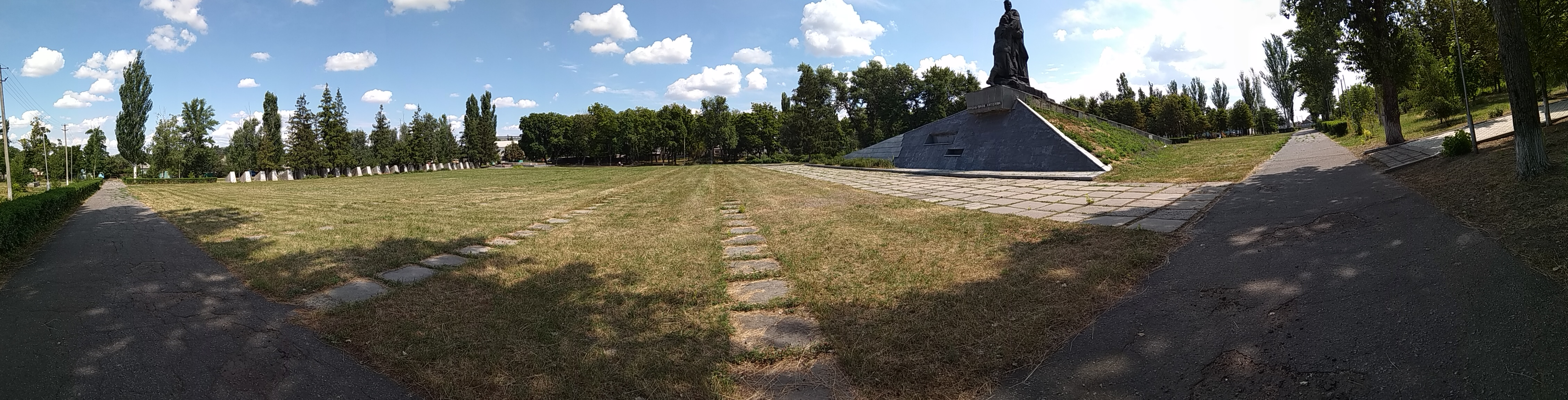
Panorama of the monument "Ukraine to the Liberators"

== Infrastructure ==
=== Transportation ===
Local highway T-13-07 passes through the settlement. The nearest railway station Chertkovo on the partially deconstructed old Zhuravka - Bochenkovo track (part of the Moscow-Kazanskaya - Rostov-Glavny main line) is the junction point of the North Caucasus and South Eastern Railway.

== Notable people ==
- Denys Harmash (born 1990), Ukrainian footballer
- Yuriy Harbuz (born 1971), Ukrainian politician

== Twin towns – sister cities ==
- (Ukraine) Chop
