= Chertkovo railway station =

Railway station in Rostov oblast, Russia

Chertkovo
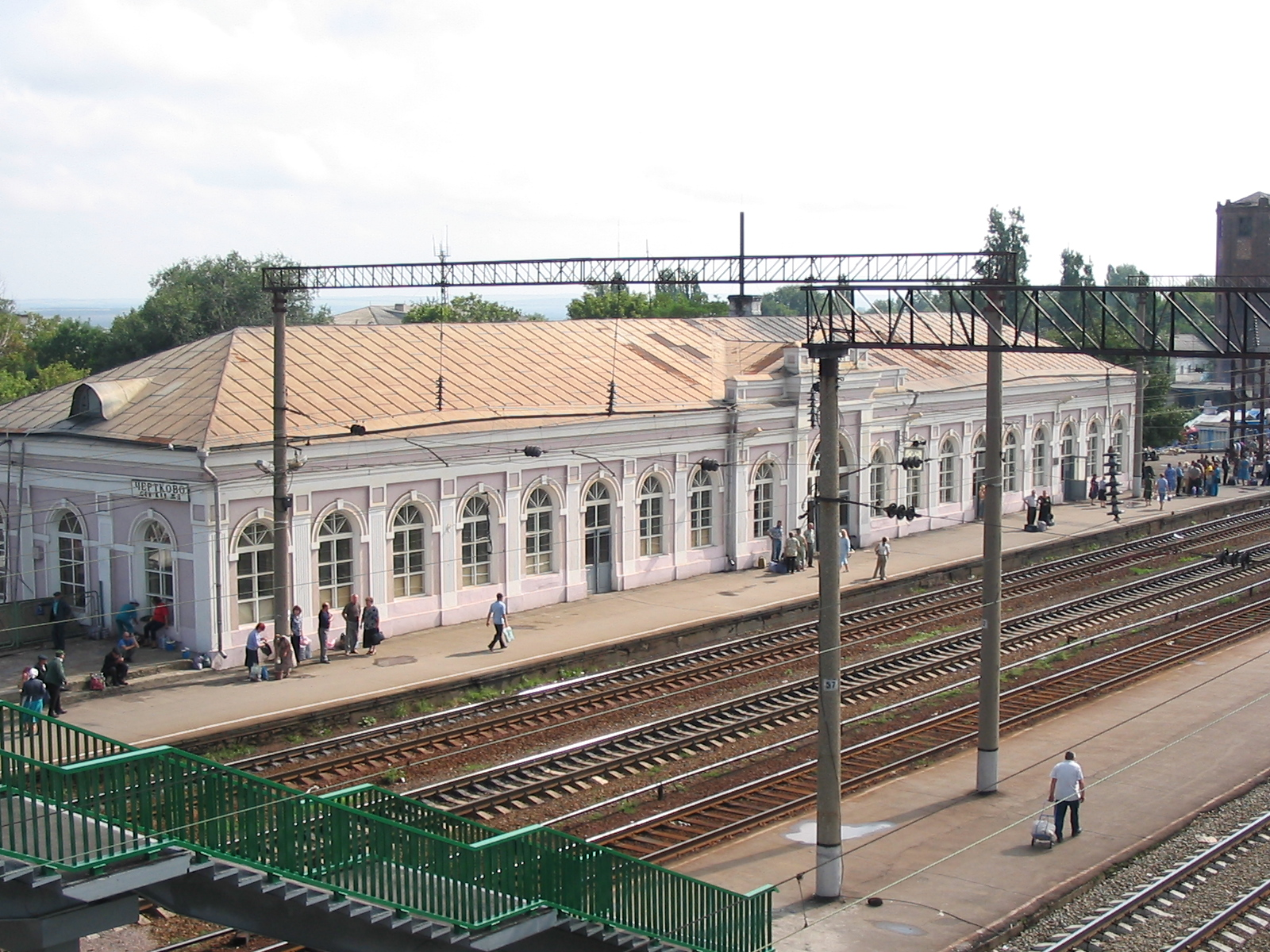
- View of the station

General information
- Location: 1, Privokzalnaya Street, Chertkovo, Russia
- Coordinates: 49.37732°N 40.14783°E
- Line: North Caucasus Railway (from 1987) South Eastern Railway (until 1987)
- Platforms: 2
- Tracks: 8

Construction
- Parking: yes

Other information
- Station code: 586203

History
- Opened: 1871
- Closed: 2019
Location

Chertkovo railway station (Russian: станция Чертково) is a former railway station in Chertkovo, Rostov oblast, Russia. It is 325 km down-line from Rostov-Glavny station and was situated between Zorinovka and Sheptukhovka on the Moscow–Rostov-on-Don line until 2017, when a bypass between Zhuravka and Millerovo was completed. The station is adjacent to the border with Ukraine, just across the tracks from the Ukrainian village of Milove.

== History ==
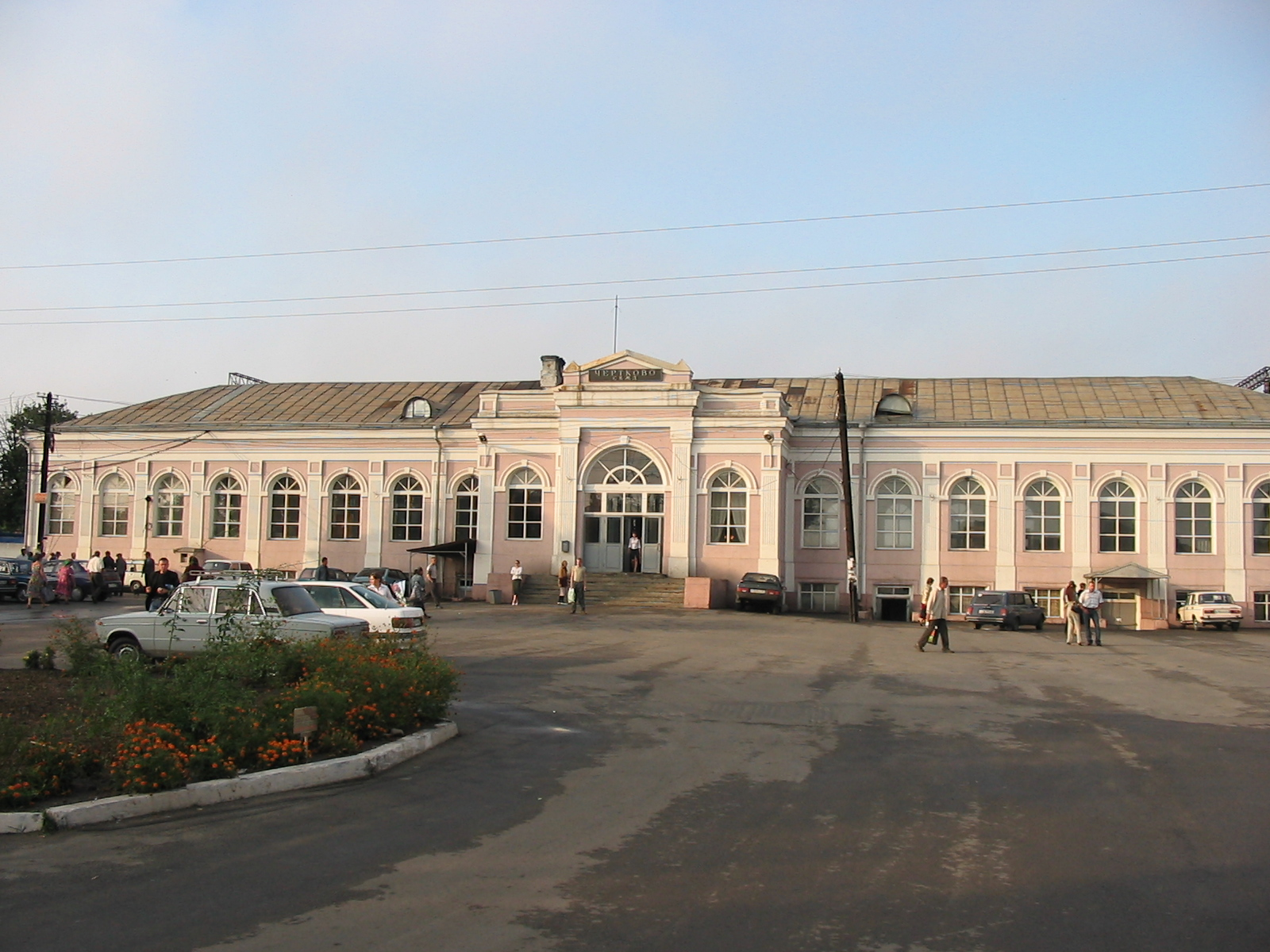
View of the station from Privokzalnaya Street

The station was established on 14 August 1869 during construction of the south section of the South Eastern Railway near the border between Don Host Oblast and Kharkov Governorate. The station was named for ataman Mikhail Chertkov, who petitioned to construct the railway. The village of Chertkovo was founded due to construction of the railway station.

In 1873 the Chertkovo second-class station had a one-storey stone station building, one passenger and two cargo platforms, locomotive depot for 12 steam locomotives, reservoir for water, two stone and eight wooden constructions, bathhouse, laundry and other warehouses. Buffets, bookstall and newsstand operated at the station. The railway line was fully equipped with the latest technology. Wireless telegraphs of the Markoni Company were used in Chertkovo. In the early 1900s Chertkovo was a small workers' settlement where there were a church, drinking establishment and bunkhouse. At that time construction of a hospital began. Chertkovo had one secondary school and college.

In 1987 the railway line from Chertkovo to Zverevo was transferred from the South Eastern Railway to the North Caucasus Railway, with the new connection between the two railways being just north of Chertkovo station.

The opening ceremony of the bust of Mikhail Chertkov took place at the square front of the station in August 2009. The event was held in conjunction with the 140-year anniversary of Chertkovo.

A 37-kilometre section of the railway line between Chertkovo and Gartmashevka in the Kantemirovsky District of Voronezh Oblast to the north passed through Ukraine's Luhansk Oblast, with Russian Railways leasing the rail infrastructure from a Ukrainian village council. Due to the war in Donbas, Russian Railways wanted to bypass Ukraine to ensure security of passengers and cargo transportation. Construction of a bypass, from Zhuravka in the Kantemirovsky District in the north to Millerovo in the south, began in 2015. It became operational in August 2017. It has 122.5 km double-track, 25 kV 50 Hz, maximum speed of 160 km/h, cost 56 billion RUB. On 11 December 2017, Russian Railways switched all long-distance trains to the new line to bypass Ukraine and, consequently, Chertkovo. In 2018 local services were also terminated and the station closed in 2019.

== Services ==
Until the Russo-Ukrainian War Chertkovo was a station for long-distance and suburban trains operated by Russian Railways. The most common destinations were: Rostov-on-Don, Moscow, Adler, Novorossiysk, Anapa, Kislovodsk, Yeysk, Saint Petersburg, Stavropol, Sukhumi, Vladikavkaz. The average stopping time of passenger trains was about 2 minutes.
