= Chertkovsky =

Chertkovsky (masculine), Chertkovskaya (feminine), or Chertkovskoye (neuter) may refer to:

- Chertkovsky District, a district of Rostov Oblast, Russia
- Chertkovskaya, a rural locality (a stanitsa) in Rostov Oblast, Russia
