= Milove settlement hromada =

Milove settlement hromada Міловська селищна громада
- Hromada
- Interactive map of Milove settlement hromada
- Country: Ukraine
- Oblast: Luhansk
- Raion: Starobilsk

Area
  - Total: 970.8 km^{2} (374.8 sq mi)

Population (2020)
  - Total: 14,755
  - Density: 15.20/km^{2} (39.36/sq mi)
- Settlements: 29
- Villages: 28
- Towns: 1

Milove settlement hromada (Ukrainian: Міловська селищна громада) is a hromada of Ukraine, located in Starobilsk Raion, Luhansk Oblast. Its administrative center is the town of Milove.

It has an area of 970.8 square kilometres (374.8 mi^{2}) and a population of 14,755, as of 2020.

The hromada contains 29 settlements: 1 town (Milove) and 28 villages:

- Berezove
- Blahodatne
- Bondarivka
- Velikotsk
- Vodyanolipove
- Dibrova
- Zhuravske
- Zarichne
- Zorikyvka
- Zorynivka
- Kalmykivka
- Kirnosivka
- Krynychne
- Mykilske
- Morozivka
- Musiivka
- Novomykilske
- Novostriltsivka
- Oleksiivka
- Pivnivka
- Rannia Zorya
- Striltsivka
- Travneve
- Khomynske
- Shelestivka
- Shelestivka
- Yarske
- Yasnoprominske

== See also ==
- List of hromadas of Ukraine
