= Chertkovo, Vladimir Oblast =

Chertkovo Чертково
- Village
- Location within Vladimir Oblast Location within Russia
- Coordinates: 55°55′N 42°00′E
- Country: Russia
- Region: Vladimir Oblast
- District: Selivanovsky District
- Time zone: UTC+3:00

Chertkovo (Russian: Черткóво) is a rural locality (a village) and the administrative center of Chertkovskoye Rural Settlement, Selivanovsky District, Vladimir Oblast, Russia. The population was 295 as of 2010. There are 3 streets.

== Geography ==
Chertkovo is located 24 km northeast of Krasnaya Gorbatka (the district's administrative centre) by road. Kurkovo is the nearest rural locality.
