= Saransk I railway station =

Railway station in Saransk, Russia

Saransk I Саранск I
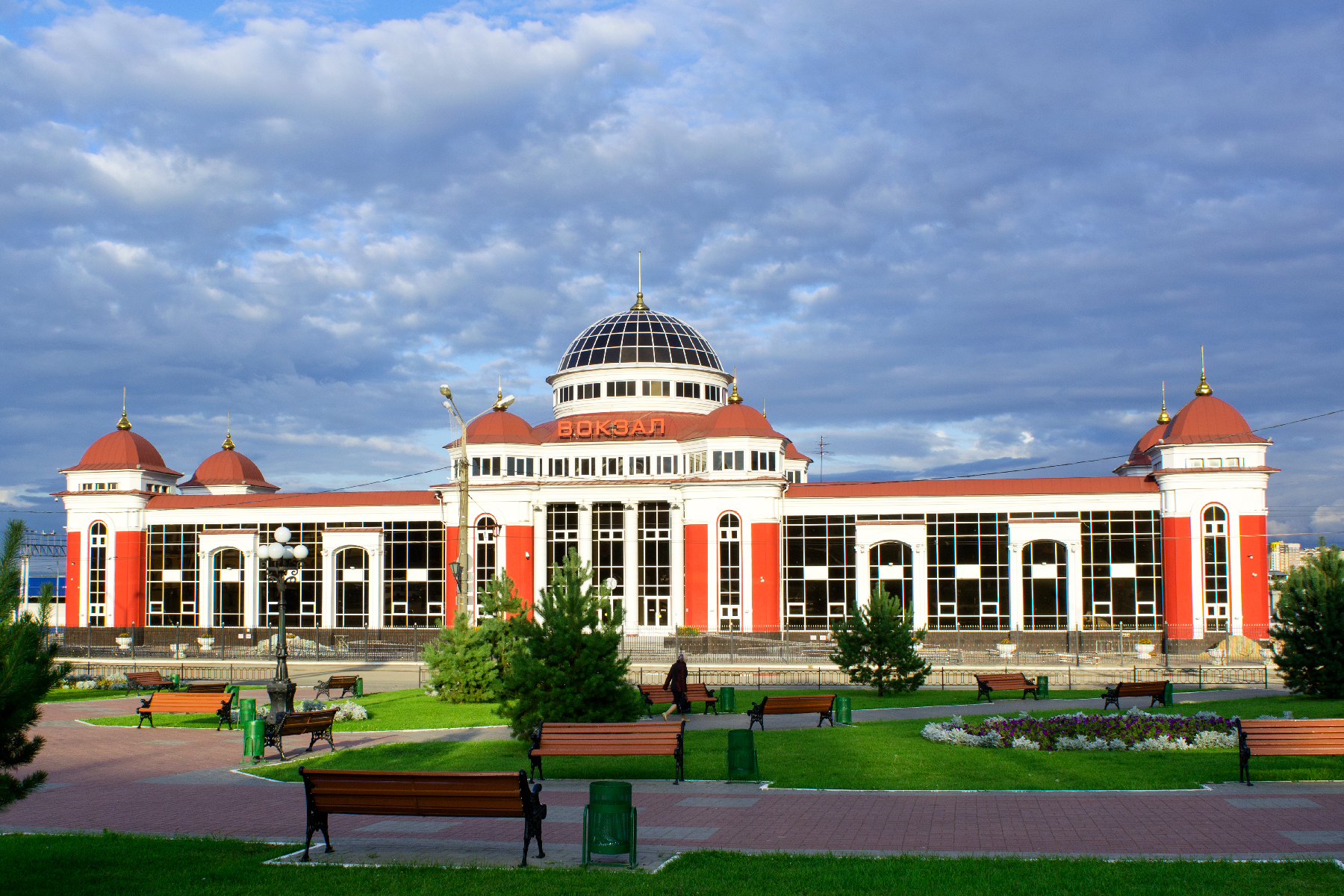
- The station building

General information
- Location: Saransk, Republic of Mordovia, Russia
- Coordinates: 54°11′44″N 45°11′26″E
- Owner: Russian Railways
- Line: Kuybyshev Railway
- Platforms: 2

History
- Opened: 1893
Location

Saransk I (Russian: Саранск I) is a railway station in Saransk, the capital of the Republic of Mordovia, Russia. The central passenger station of the city, it lies in the Penza division of the Kuybyshev Railway and links the main lines of the Gorky Railway and the Kuybyshev Railway. The station opened in 1893, when the railway reached Saransk. It is the city's main passenger station; freight traffic is handled chiefly by Saransk II, which opened the same year.

== History ==
Saransk became a stop on the Moscow–Kazan railway in 1893, when the line first connected the town to the national network. The original stone station was replaced by a two-storey brick building in 1941, which was enlarged and reconstructed about 15 years later. By the early 21st century the building had become too small for its passenger traffic; it was demolished and replaced by the present station, which has more than 3,300 square metres of floor space.

The current building follows the style of the railway stations built in Moscow in the late 1990s, with a façade largely of reflective glass. A glass dome topped by a gold-leaf spire forms its centre and lights the vestibule below, flanked by eight smaller octagonal domes, each crowned with a spire. A monument to three stratonauts who reached an altitude of 22 kilometres in 1934 stands in the square in front of the station; sculpted by A. Pismenny and A. Dushkin, it was erected in 1963.

== Lines ==
Saransk is an important railway junction, with connections to Ryazan, Nizhny Novgorod, Kazan, Samara and Penza. The city lies on the railway running north to south from Nizhny Novgorod and Kazan to Penza; the Moscow–Ryazan–Samara trunk railway crosses Mordovia from west to east.

== Gallery ==
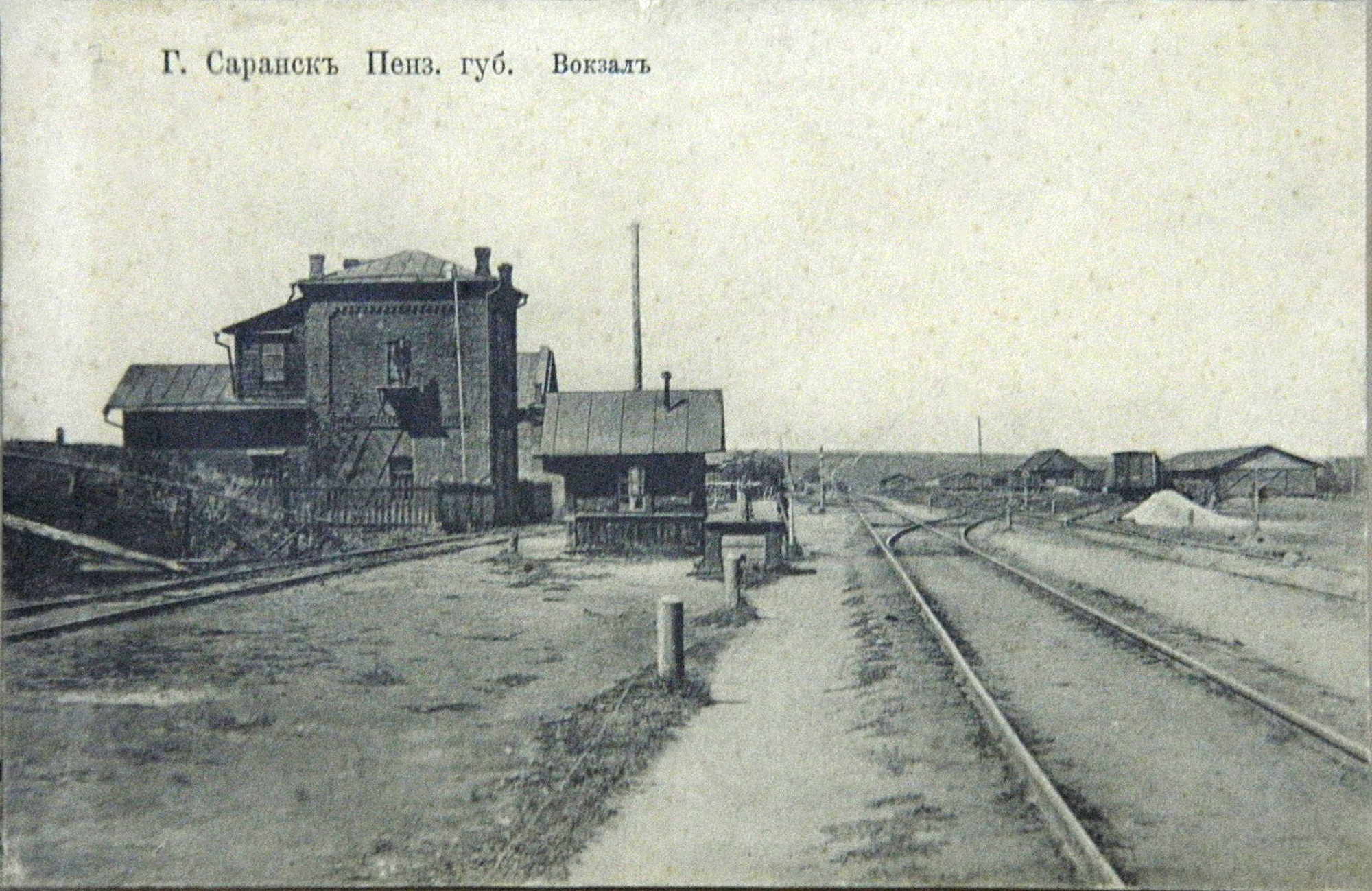
The original station building, opened in 1893

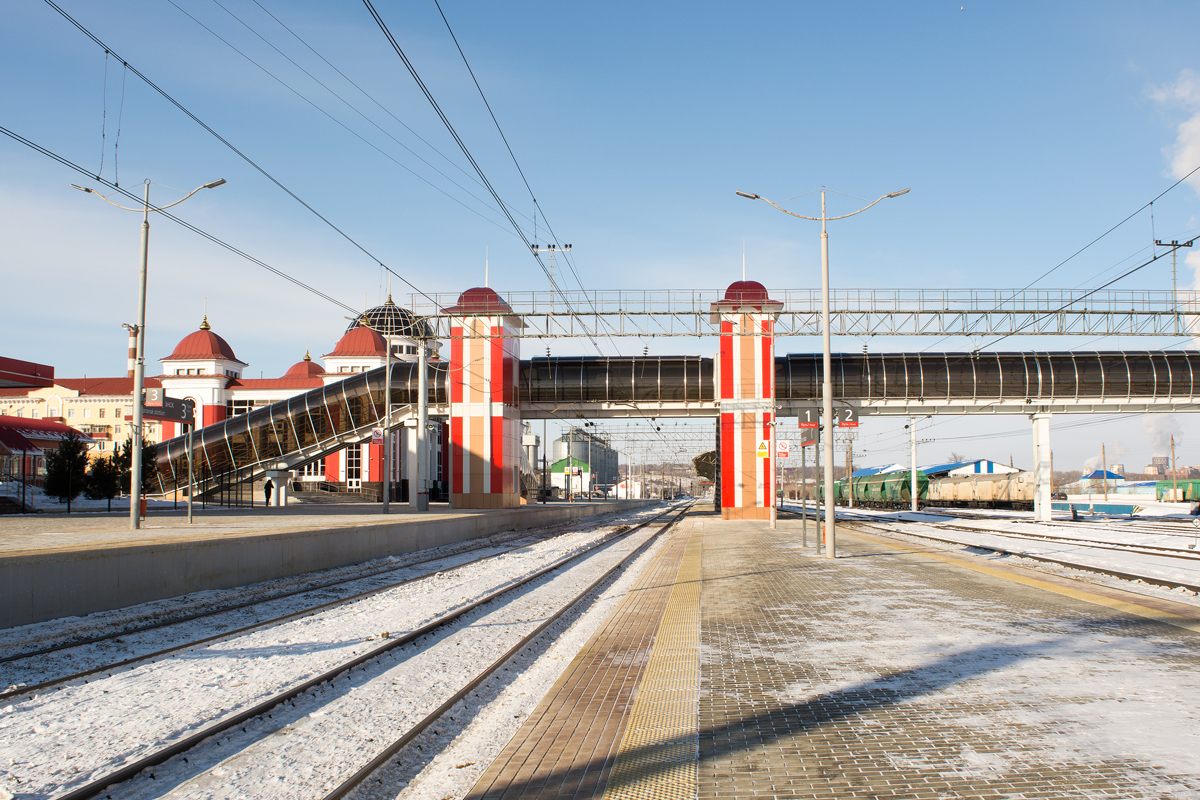
The current station building, 2018
