= Red Arrow (Russian train) =

Russian overnight sleeper train

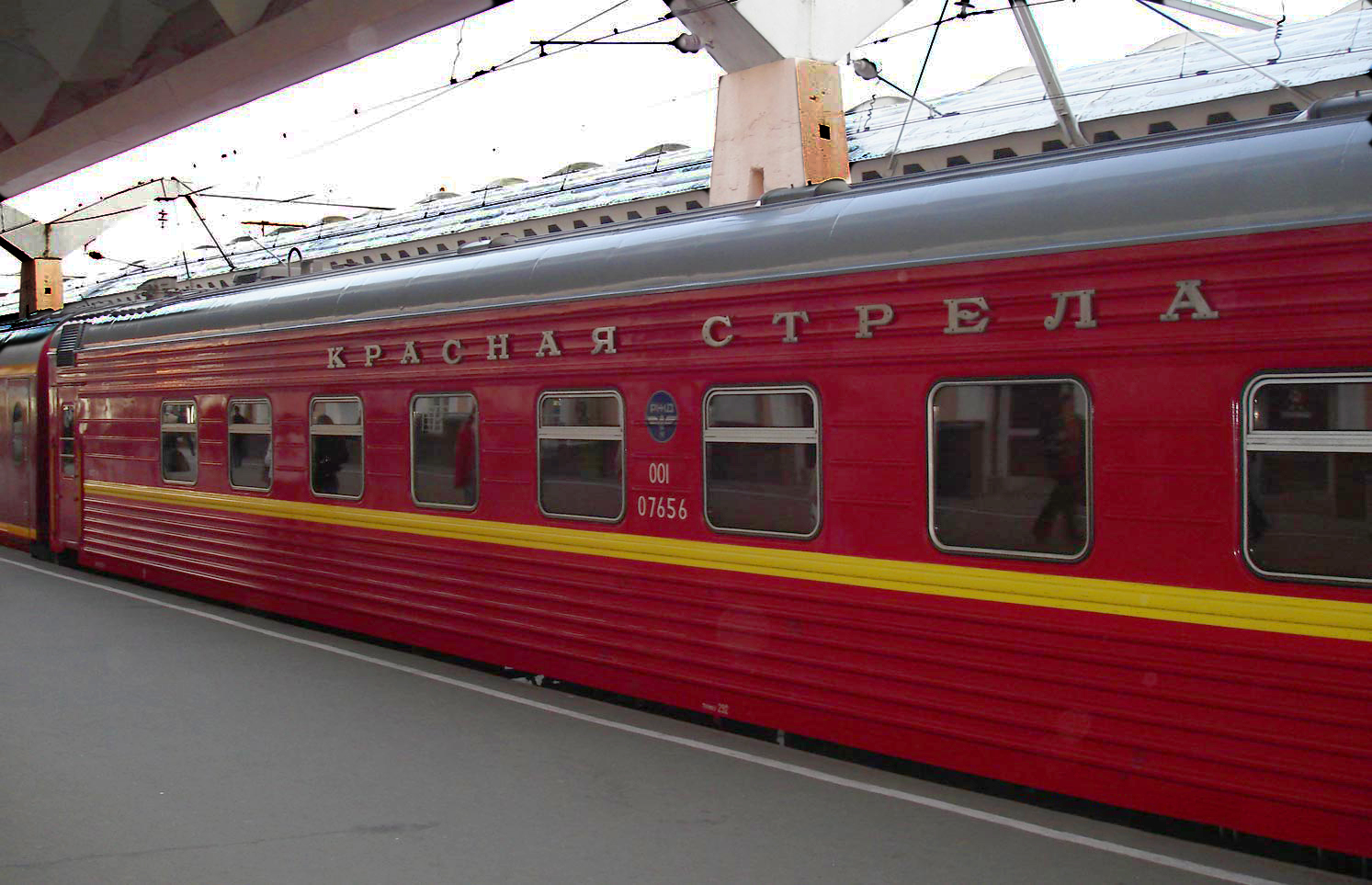
The Red Arrow sleeper train running between Moscow and Saint Petersburg.

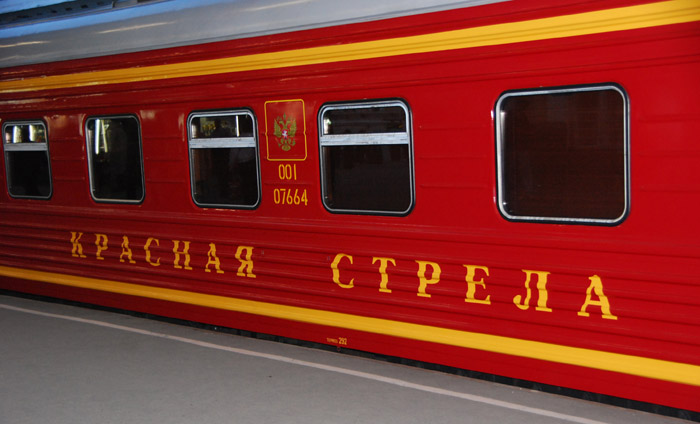
The Red Arrow (new cars) leaves St Petersburg, as "The Hymn to the Great City" is played in Moscow Station.

The Red Arrow (Russian: Кра́сная стрела́) is a Russian overnight sleeper train connecting Moscow and Saint Petersburg via the Moscow–Saint Petersburg Railway.

== History ==
The Red Arrow runs from Leningrad Station in Moscow to Moscow Station in Saint Petersburg. It started its first regular service on June 9, 1931, and has only been interrupted between 1941 and 1943 during the Siege of Leningrad. In 1962, the deep red colour of the train was adopted. Since 1965, the song "The Hymn to the Great City" has been playing when the Red Arrow leaves Saint Petersburg at 23:55. It was composed by Reinhold Glière in 1949 and has been adopted as the hymn of Saint Petersburg in 2003. The Red Arrow is the most popular train in Russia. In Soviet times the Communist Party elite were carried out only by the Red Arrow between Moscow and Leningrad.

To enhance capacity, a second sleeper train was introduced in 1978, called the Red Arrow 2; this service leaves Moscow and Leningrad four minutes later. As newly designed cars were introduced by Russian Railways in 2007, the Red Arrow 2 was renamed Express. As the demand for sleeper train increased even more, a private sleeper train, called Megapolis, was introduced by the Tverskoy Express company, leaving Moscow or St Petersburg after the Red Arrow and Express.

== Structure of the Red Arrow ==
The Red Arrow has a restaurant car, VIP carriages, as well as 1st and 2nd class carriages. In designing the interior of the compartment cars, mainly wood is used. The VIP cars have a low noise level, air conditioning and ventilation system, flip-top sleeping berth, convertible table, conductor call button, bathroom and environmentally friendly toilet.

== Notable events ==
In honour of the 75th anniversary of the train, a special subway train called Red Arrow - 75 Years was launched in 2006 on the Moscow Metro. On 29 March 2010 the subway train was bombed in the terrorist attack at Lubyanka station. As of June 2010 the subway train has been repaired and relaunched.
