= Chertkovo, Rostov Oblast =

Rural locality in Rostov Oblast, Russia

Coordinates: 49°23′N 40°10′E

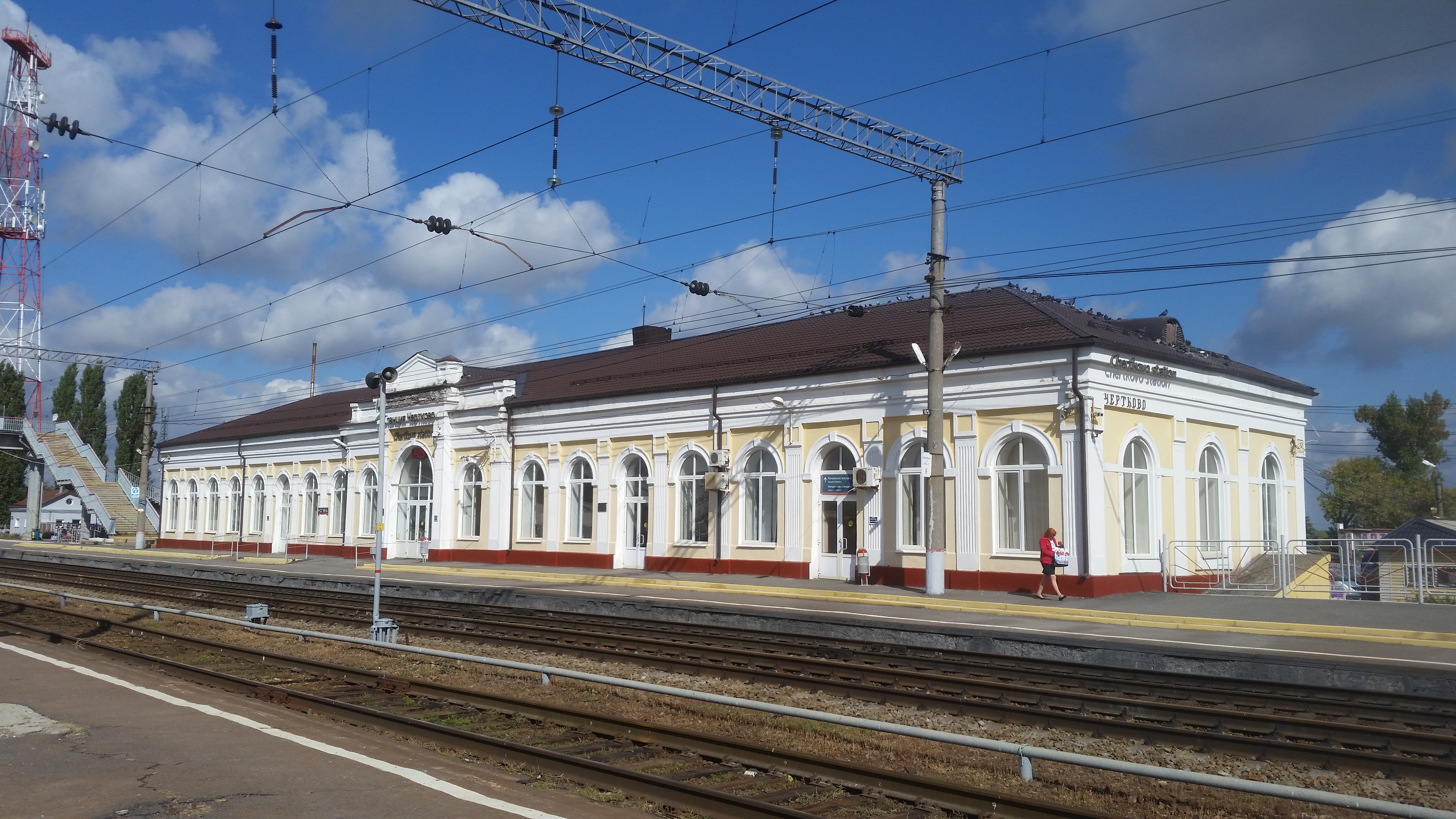
Chertkovo railway station

Coat of arms of Chertkovo

Chertkovo (Russian and Ukrainian: Чертково) is a rural locality (a settlement) and the administrative center of Chertkovsky District in Rostov Oblast, Russia. Population: 10,814 (2010 census); 11,029 (2002 census); 10,751 (1989 Soviet census).

It is separated from the urban-type settlement of Milove in Milove Raion of Luhansk Oblast, Ukraine partially by the North Caucasus Railway. The railway together with surrounding infrastructure is located on the Russian side of the border. Both localities were served by Chertkovo railway station until the Russo-Ukrainian War. A bypass avoiding the border was completed between Zhuravka and Millerovo in 2017 after which traffic to Chertkovo ceased. The railway station was liquidated in 2019.

== Climate ==
Climate data for Chertkovo (extremes 1941-present)
Month	Jan	Feb	Mar	Apr	May	Jun	Jul	Aug	Sep	Oct	Nov	Dec	Year
Record high °C (°F)	11.1 (52.0)	16.2 (61.2)	22.7 (72.9)	29.8 (85.6)	35.5 (95.9)	39.6 (103.3)	40.5 (104.9)	41.0 (105.8)	36.2 (97.2)	31.2 (88.2)	20.0 (68.0)	13.4 (56.1)	41.0 (105.8)
Mean daily maximum °C (°F)	−2.5 (27.5)	−1.3 (29.7)	5.3 (41.5)	15.7 (60.3)	22.8 (73.0)	27.0 (80.6)	29.1 (84.4)	28.7 (83.7)	21.9 (71.4)	13.5 (56.3)	4.6 (40.3)	−0.9 (30.4)	13.7 (56.6)
Daily mean °C (°F)	−5.3 (22.5)	−4.8 (23.4)	0.7 (33.3)	9.5 (49.1)	16.1 (61.0)	20.4 (68.7)	22.5 (72.5)	21.5 (70.7)	15.1 (59.2)	8.3 (46.9)	1.2 (34.2)	−3.6 (25.5)	8.5 (47.3)
Mean daily minimum °C (°F)	−7.8 (18.0)	−7.6 (18.3)	−2.7 (27.1)	4.2 (39.6)	9.9 (49.8)	14.3 (57.7)	16.4 (61.5)	14.9 (58.8)	9.4 (48.9)	4.3 (39.7)	−1.4 (29.5)	−5.9 (21.4)	4.0 (39.2)
Record low °C (°F)	−32.1 (−25.8)	−32.7 (−26.9)	−29.6 (−21.3)	−10.1 (13.8)	−2.3 (27.9)	2.4 (36.3)	6.0 (42.8)	1.5 (34.7)	−5.4 (22.3)	−11.2 (11.8)	−23.3 (−9.9)	−31.8 (−25.2)	−32.7 (−26.9)
Average precipitation mm (inches)	49.0 (1.93)	39.1 (1.54)	38.3 (1.51)	38.8 (1.53)	45.4 (1.79)	57.8 (2.28)	67.4 (2.65)	32.3 (1.27)	43.9 (1.73)	43.9 (1.73)	39.8 (1.57)	50.2 (1.98)	545.9 (21.51)
Source: pogoda.ru.net
