= Milove Raion =

Former subdivision of Luhansk Oblast, Ukraine

Milove Raion Міловський район
- Raion
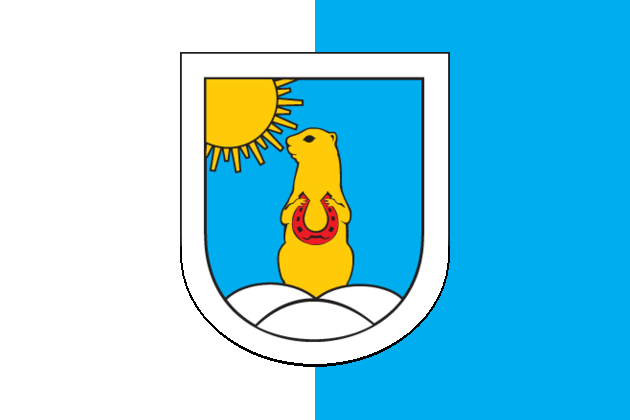
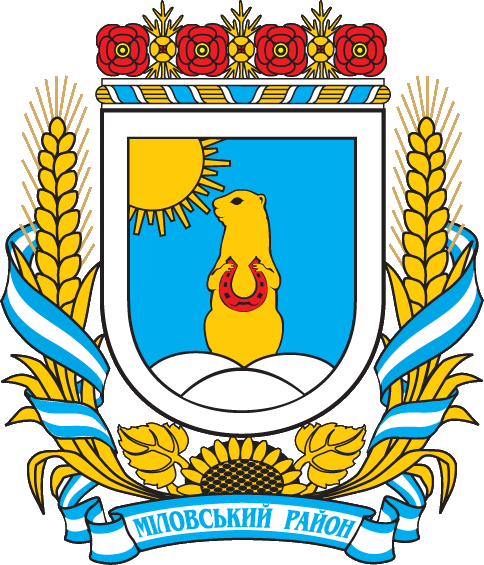
- Flag Coat of arms

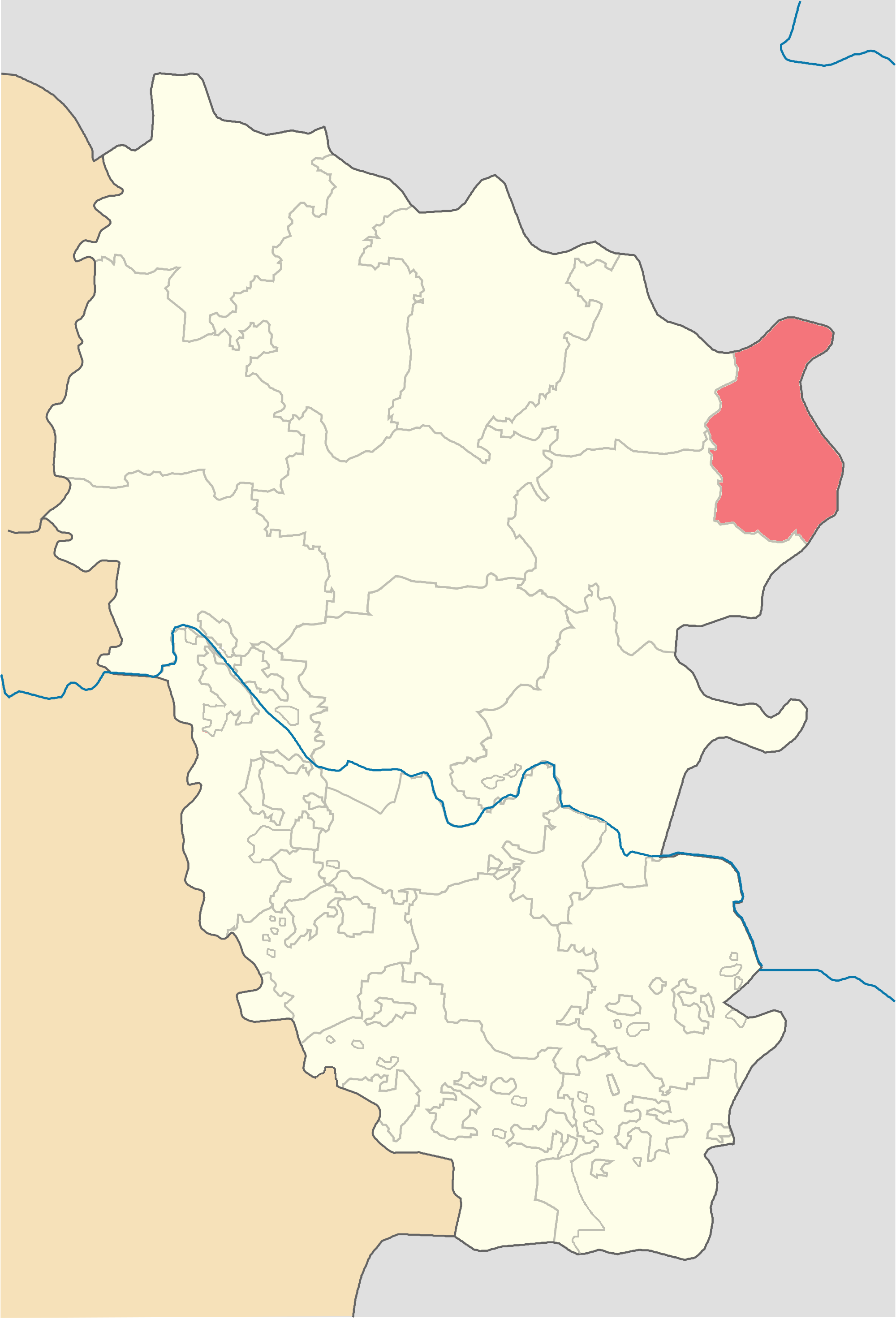
- Coordinates: 49°22′41″N 39°58′46″E
- Country: Ukraine
- Region: Luhansk Oblast
- Established: 1920
- Disestablished: 18 July 2020
- Admin. center: Milove
- Subdivisions: List: 0 — city councils; 1 — settlement councils; 7 — rural councils; Number of localities: 0 — cities; 1 — urban-type settlements; 25 — villages; 0 — rural settlements

Government
  - Governor: Genadiy Chernousov

Area
  - Total: 971 km^{2} (375 sq mi)

Population (2020)
  - Total: 14,885 ▼
  - Density: 15.3/km^{2} (39.7/sq mi)
- Time zone: UTC+02:00 (EET)
  - Summer (DST): UTC+03:00 (EEST)
- Postal index: 92500—92543
- Area code: +380 6465
- Website: http://mil.loga.gov.ua

Melovsky Municipal District Меловский муниципальный округ (Russian)
- District

Other transcription(s)
  - Ukrainian: Міловський район
- Flag Coat of arms

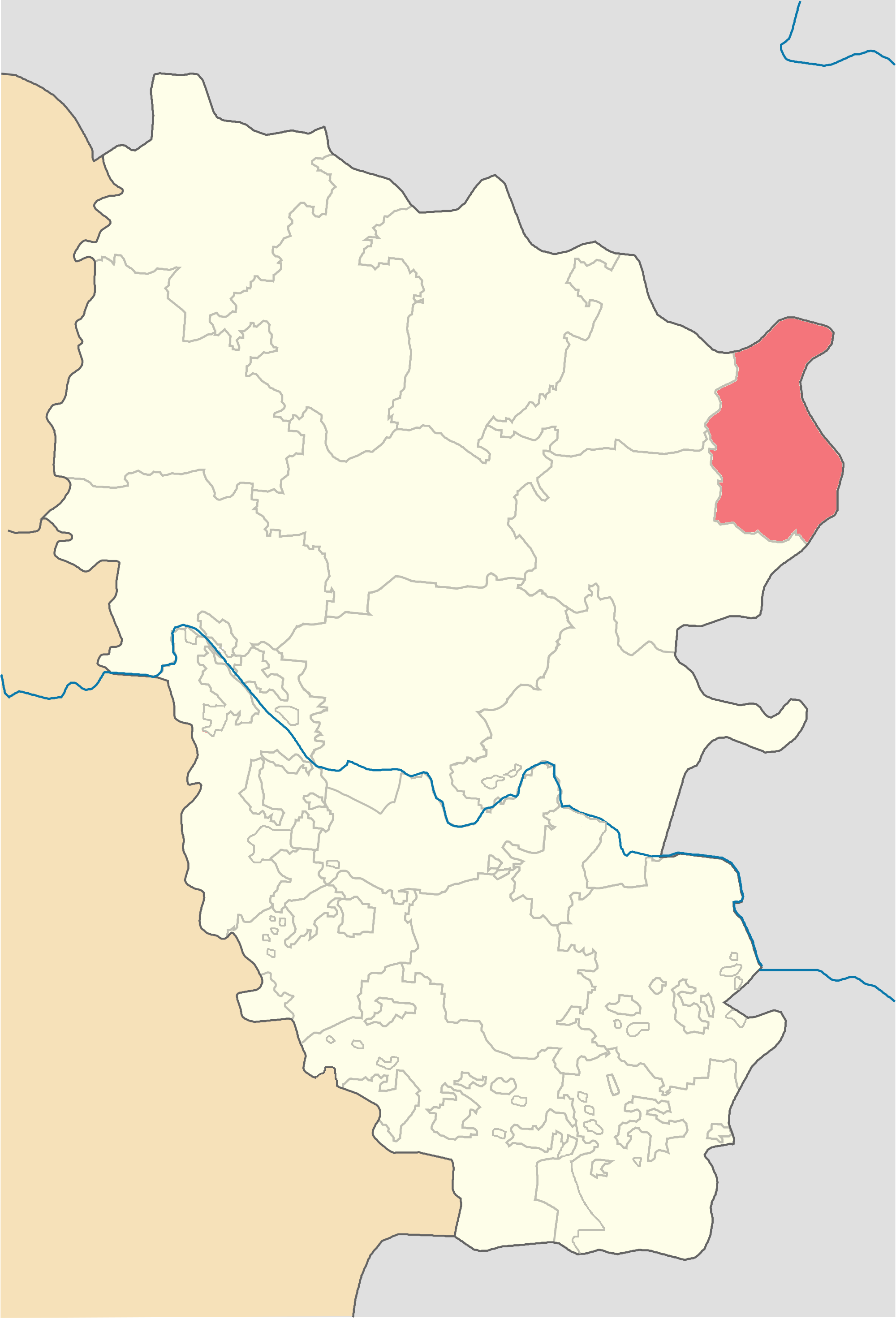
- Location of Melovsky District in the Luhansk People's Republic
- Coordinates: 49°22′41″N 39°58′46″E
- Country: Russia
- Federal subject: Luhansk People's Republic
- Established: 1920
- Administrative center: Melove

Area
  - Total: 971 km^{2} (375 sq mi)
- Website: https://melovoe.ru

Milove Raion (Ukrainian: Міловський район, romanized: Milovs'kyi raion; Russian: Меловский район, romanized: Melovskiy raion) was a raion (district) in Luhansk Oblast of eastern Ukraine. It was located on the Russian border. The administrative center of the raion was the urban-type settlement of Milove. The raion was abolished on 18 July 2020 as part of the administrative reform of Ukraine, which reduced the number of raions of Luhansk Oblast to eight, of which only four were controlled by the government. The last estimate of the raion population was 14,885 (2020 est.). The territory of the former raion was occupied by invading Russian forces early in the 2022 Russian invasion of Ukraine and was reestablished.

== Demographics ==
As of the 2001 Ukrainian census:

Ethnicity

- Ukrainians: 77.7%
- Russians: 19.6%
- Belarusians: 0.3%
