= Zhuravka, Kantemirovsky District, Voronezh Oblast =

Zhuravka Журавка
- Selo
- Location within Voronezh Oblast Location within Russia
- Coordinates: 49°46′N 39°48′E
- Country: Russia
- Region: Voronezh Oblast
- District: Kantemirovsky District
- Time zone: UTC+3:00

Zhuravka (Russian: Журавка) is a rural locality (selo) and the administrative center of Zhuravskoye Rural Settlement, Kantemirovsky District, Voronezh Oblast, Russia. The population was 722, as of 2010. There are five streets.

== Geography ==
Zhuravka is located 10 kilometres (6.2 mi) northwest of Kantemirovka (the district's administrative centre) by road. Kasyanovka is the nearest rural locality.
