= Bogucharsky Uyezd =

Subdivision of Voronezh Governorate, Russian Empire

Bogucharsky Uyezd (Russian: Богучарский уезд; Ukrainian: Богучарський повіт, romanized: Bohucharskyi povit) was one of the subdivisions of the Voronezh Governorate of the Russian Empire. It was situated in the southeastern part of the governorate. Its administrative centre was Boguchar.

== Demographics ==
At the time of the Russian Empire Census of 1897, Bogucharsky Uyezd had a population of 309,965. Of these, 81.8% spoke Ukrainian, 17.8% Russian, 0.2% Belarusian and 0.1% Romani as their native language.
