= Chertkovsky District =

Chertkovsky District Чертковский район (Russian)
- District
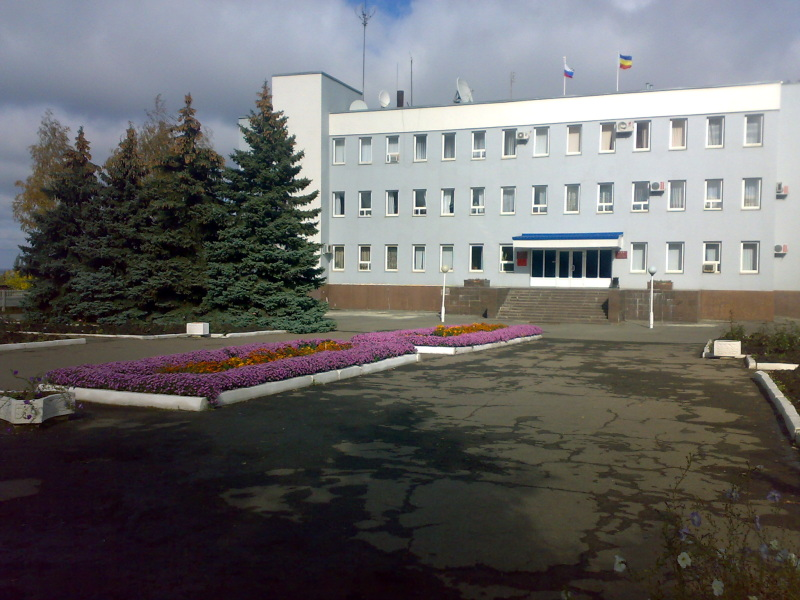
- Chertkovsky District Administration building

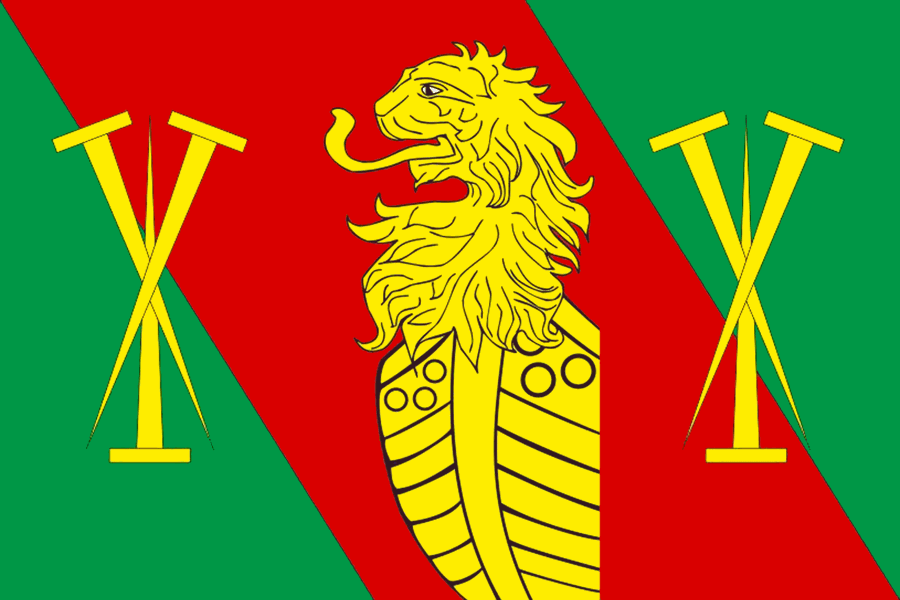
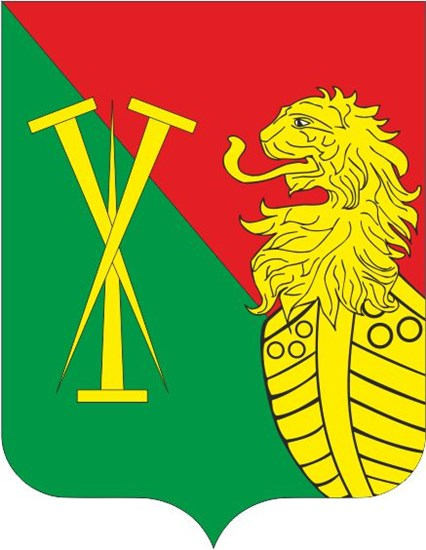
- Flag Coat of arms
- Location of Chertkovsky District in Rostov Oblast
- Coordinates: 49°22′43″N 40°09′01″E
- Country: Russia
- Federal subject: Rostov Oblast
- Established: 1920
- Administrative center: Chertkovo

Area
  - Total: 2,766 km^{2} (1,068 sq mi)

Population (2010 Census)
  - Total: 36,680
  - Density: 13.26/km^{2} (34.35/sq mi)
  - Urban: 0%
  - Rural: 100%

Administrative structure
  - Administrative divisions: 14 rural settlement
  - Inhabited localities: 66 rural localities

Municipal structure
  - Municipally incorporated as: Chertkovsky Municipal District
  - Municipal divisions: 0 urban settlements, 14 rural settlements
- Time zone: UTC+3 (MSK)
- OKTMO ID: 60658000
- Website: http://chertkov.donland.ru/

Chertkovsky District (Russian: Чертко́вский райо́н) is an administrative and municipal district (raion), one of the forty-three in Rostov Oblast, Russia. It is located in the northwest of the oblast. The area of the district is 2,766 square kilometers (1,068 sq mi). Its administrative center is the rural locality (a settlement) of Chertkovo. Population: 36,680 (2010 Census); 39,974 (2002 census); 40,355 (1989 Soviet census). The population of Chertkovo accounts for 29.5% of the district's total population.
