= Kantemirovka =

Kantemirovka Кантемировка
- Urban-type settlement
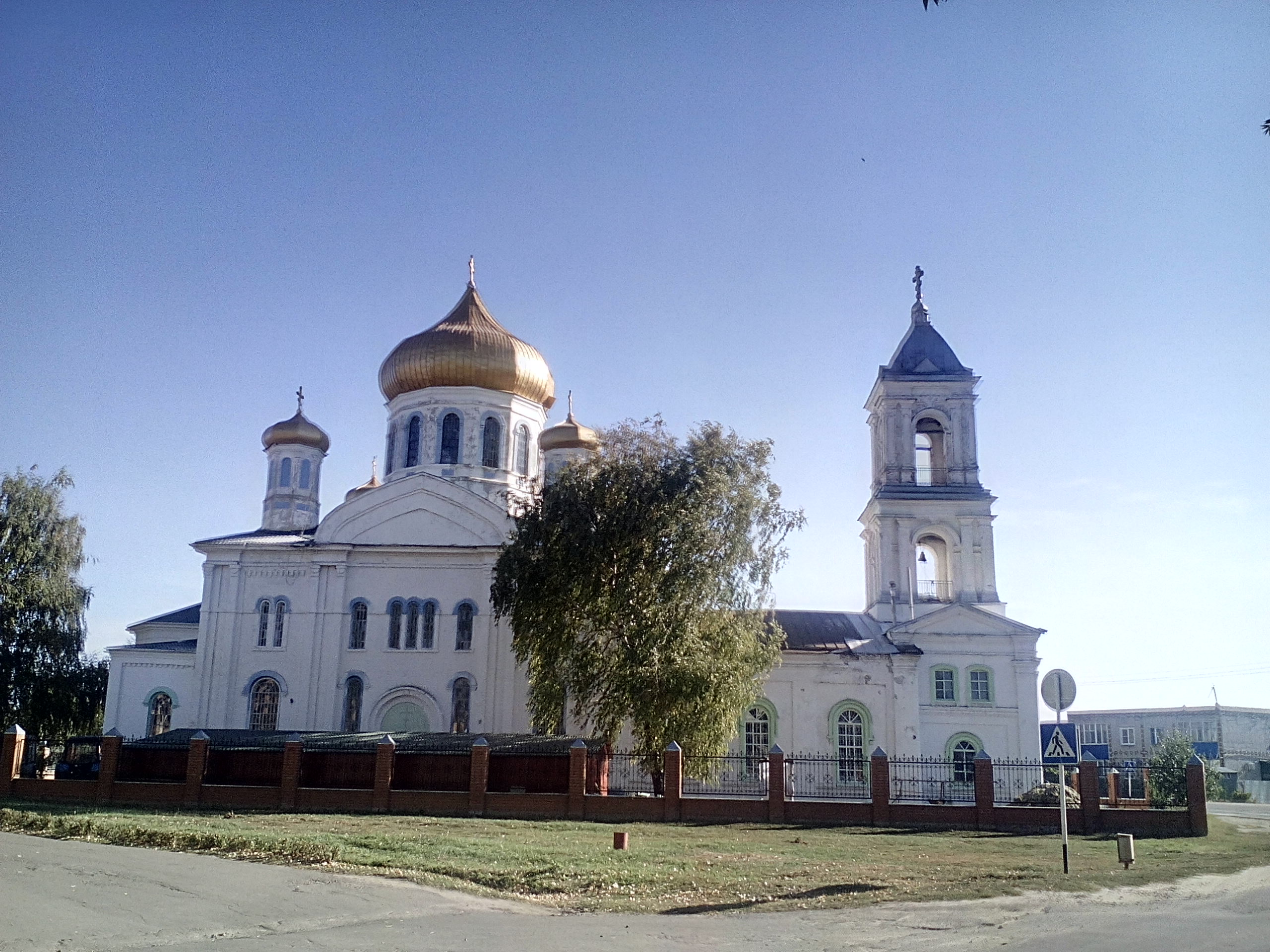

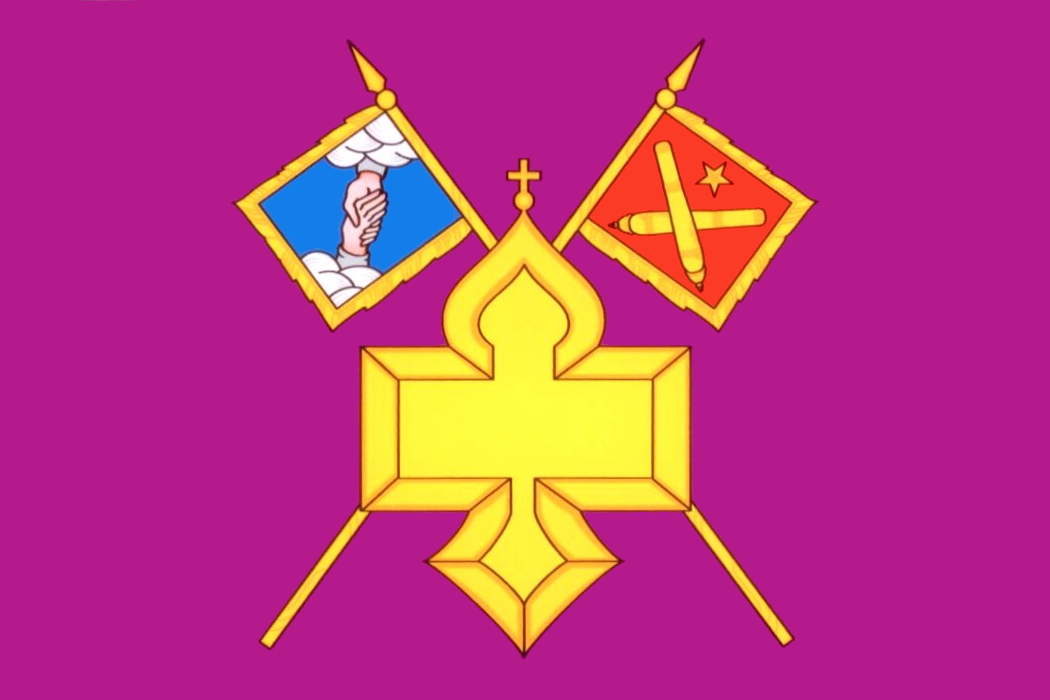
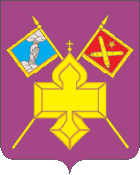
- Flag Coat of arms
- Interactive map of Kantemirovka
- Location of Kantemirovka Kantemirovka (Voronezh Oblast)
- Coordinates: 49.7027°N 39.8540°E
- Country: Russia
- Federal subject: Voronezh Oblast
- Administrative district: Kantemirovsky District
- Founded: 1742

Population (2010 Census)
  - Total: 11,943
  - Estimate (2025): 10,191 (−14.7%)
- Time zone: UTC+3 (MSK)
- Postal code: 396730
- OKTMO ID: 20619151051

Kantemirovka (Russian: Кантемировка; earlier Konstantinovka, Russian: Константиновка) is an urban locality (an urban-type settlement) in Kantemirovsky District of Voronezh Oblast, Russia. Population: 10,715 (2021 census); 11,943 (2010 census); 12,949 (2002 census); 13,465 (1989 Soviet census).

It was founded in the 18th century, and is named after its landowners Constantin Cantemir and his son Dimitrie Cantemir, members of the former ruling family of Moldavia. They sided with Peter the Great's army to free their land from the Ottoman Empire, and when the Russian side lost, moved to Russia and were included in Russian nobility. Dimitrie was a philosopher and writer, as well as a musician, and his son Antioch a prominent Russian author. In the 19th century the village was the center of Konstantinovskaya volost, Bogucharsky Uyezd, Voronezh Governorate.

In 1942, during World War II, there was heavy fighting for Kantemirovka's railway station. Kantemirovka was under German occupation from 10 July 1942 until 19 December 1942, when Red Army tank units of the Southwestern Front finally freed it from German troops. In honour of this victory, the derivative adjective name Kantemirovskaya was awarded to the 4th Guards Tank Division, and 10 years later a street in Leningrad (now Saint Petersburg) was renamed after the victory; in Moscow a street was named after the division, and a metro station after the street; in Leningrad its street gave name to a large bridge built in 1979–82 at its western end, and in the 21st century, Saint Petersburg planned to build a station of its metro Ring Line on the street near the bridge named Kantemirovskaya.

== Notable people ==
- Yevhen Pluzhnyk (1898-1936), Ukrainian poet
