= Kantemirovsky District =

Kantemirovsky District Кантемировский район (Russian)
- District
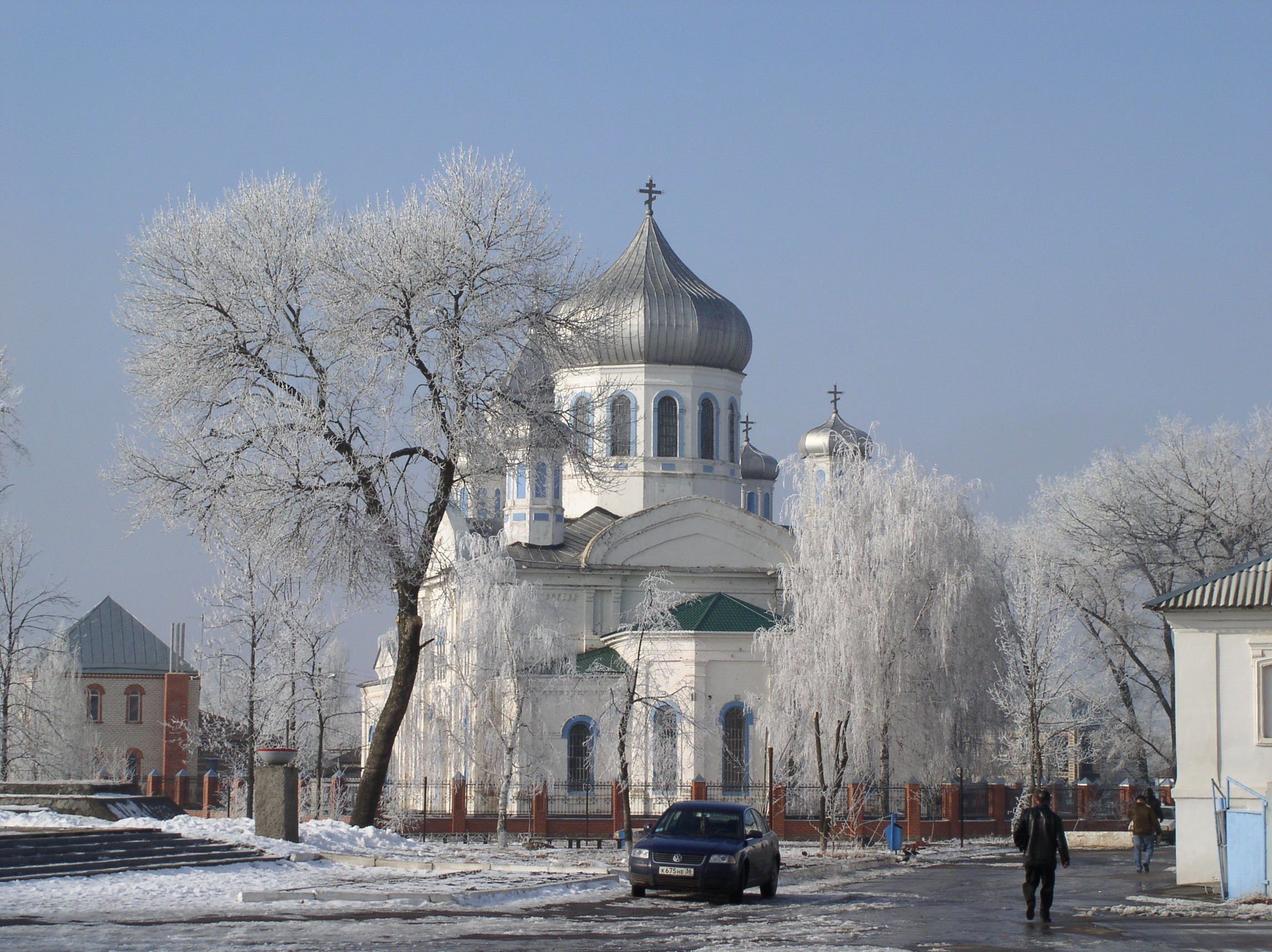
- Trinity Church, Kantemirova, Kantemirovsky District

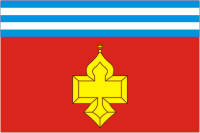
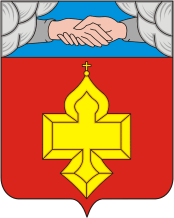
- Flag Coat of arms
- Location of Kantemirovsky District in Voronezh Oblast
- Coordinates: 49°41′N 39°51′E
- Country: Russia
- Federal subject: Voronezh Oblast
- Established: 1928
- Administrative center: Kantemirovka

Area
  - Total: 2,348 km^{2} (907 sq mi)

Population (2010 Census)
  - Total: 38,081
  - Density: 16.22/km^{2} (42.01/sq mi)
  - Urban: 31.4%
  - Rural: 68.6%

Administrative structure
  - Administrative divisions: 1 Urban settlements, 15 Rural settlements
  - Inhabited localities: 1 urban-type settlements, 59 rural localities

Municipal structure
  - Municipally incorporated as: Kantemirovsky Municipal District
  - Municipal divisions: 1 urban settlements, 15 rural settlements
- Time zone: UTC+3 (MSK)
- OKTMO ID: 20619000
- Website: http://www.kantemirovka-admin.ru/

Kantemirovsky District (Russian: Кантеми́ровский райо́н) is an administrative and municipal district (raion), one of the thirty-two in Voronezh Oblast, Russia. It is located in the south of the oblast. The area of the district is 2,348 square kilometers (907 sq mi). Its administrative center is the urban locality (an urban-type settlement) of Kantemirovka. Population: 32,091 (2021 census); 38,081 (2010 census); 41,808 (2002 census); 42,947 (1989 Soviet census). The population of Kantemirovka accounts for 33.4% of the district's total population.
