= Sochi =

City in Krasnodar Krai, Russia

Sochi Сочи
- City
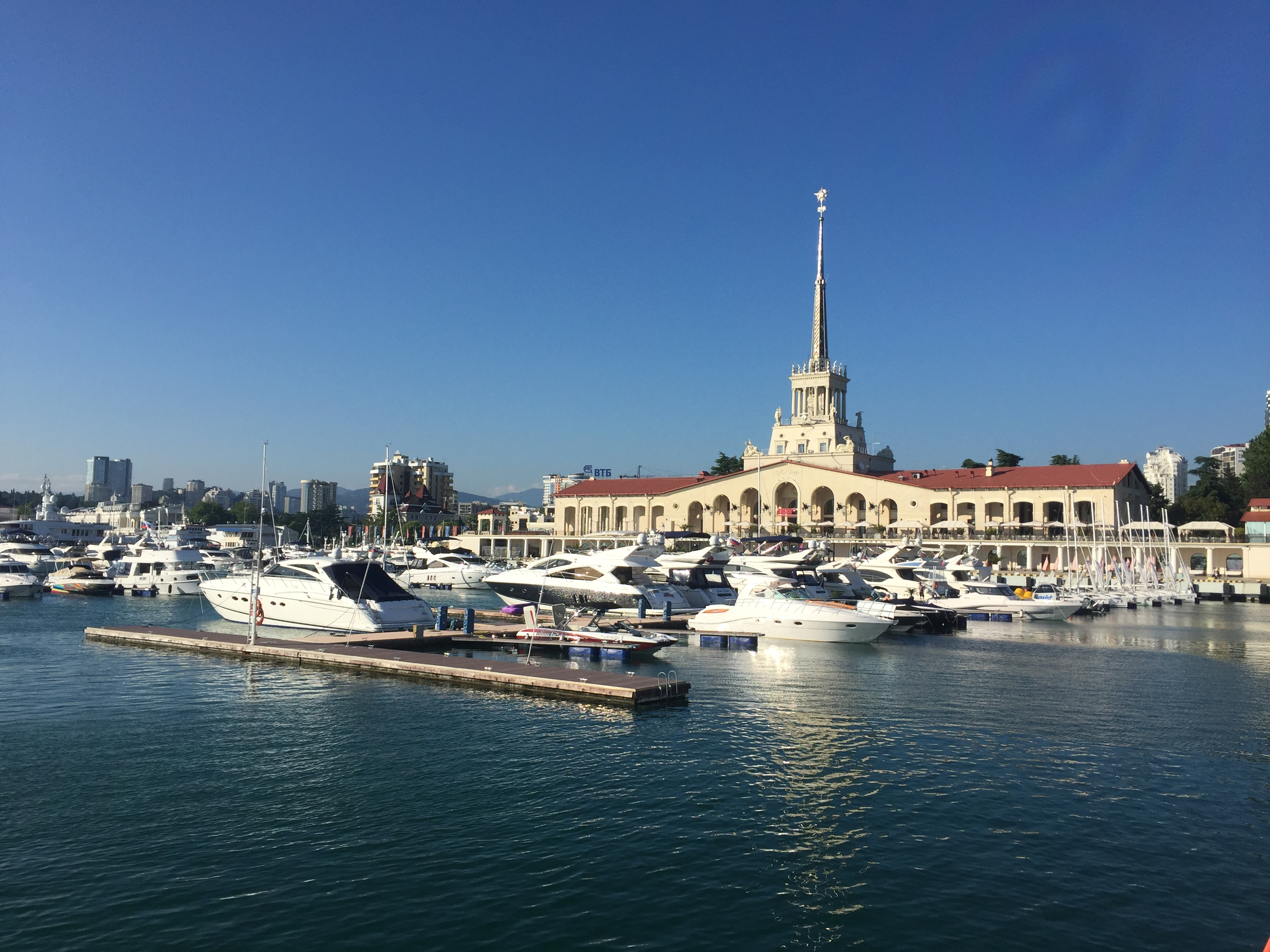
- Panorama of Sochi Sochi Sea Port Sochi International Airport Olympic flame Sochi railway station Sochi Olympic Park

- Flag Coat of arms
- Interactive map of Sochi
- Location of Sochi Sochi (Black Sea) Sochi (European Russia) Sochi (Russia) Sochi (Europe)
- Coordinates: 43°35′07″N 39°43′13″E
- Country: Russia
- Federal subject: Krasnodar Krai
- Founded: 1838

Government
  - Body: City Assembly
  - Head: Andrey Proshunin

Area
  - Total: 176.77 km^{2} (68.25 sq mi)
- Elevation: 65 m (213 ft)

Population (2010 Census)
  - Total: 343,334
  - Estimate (2025): 444,989 (+29.6%)
  - Rank: 52nd in 2010
  - Density: 1,942.3/km^{2} (5,030.4/sq mi)

Administrative status
  - Subordinated to: City of Sochi
  - Capital of: City of Sochi

Municipal status
  - Urban okrug: Sochi Urban Okrug
  - Capital of: Sochi Urban Okrug
- Time zone: UTC+3 (MSK)
- Postal codes: 354000, 354002–354004, 354008–354010, 354013, 354014, 354018, 354019, 354022, 354024, 354025, 354030, 354031, 354033, 354036, 354037, 354039, 354053–354055, 354057, 354059, 354061, 354065–354068, 354071, 354073, 354084, 354099, 354200, 354202–354214, 354216–354218, 354220, 354226, 354231, 354233, 354299, 354340, 354346, 354348, 354349, 354354, 354355, 354364, 354380, 354382, 354383, 354399, 993501
- Dialing code: +7 862
- OKTMO ID: 03726000001
- Website: sochiadm.ru

Sochi (Russian: Сочи, IPA: [ˈsotɕɪ], from Ubykh: Шъуача – seaside) is the largest resort city in Russia. The city is situated on the Sochi River, along the Black Sea in the North Caucasus of Southern Russia, with a population of 466,078 residents, and up to 600,000 residents in the urban area. The city covers an area of 176.77 square kilometers (68.25 sq mi), while the Greater Sochi Area covers over 3,502 square kilometers (1,352 sq mi). Sochi stretches across 145 kilometers (90 mi), and is the longest city in Europe (territorially), the fifth-largest city in the Southern Federal District, the second-largest city in Krasnodar Krai, and the sixth-largest city on the Black Sea.

Sochi hosted the XXII Olympic Winter Games and XI Paralympic Winter Games in 2014. It hosted the alpine and Nordic Olympic events at the nearby ski resort of Rosa Khutor in Krasnaya Polyana. It also hosted the Formula 1 Russian Grand Prix from 2014 until 2021. It was also one of the host cities for the 2018 FIFA World Cup.

== Etymology ==
According to the city's website, the name "Sochi" (Russian: Сочи) is the Russified form of the Circassian "Ş̂açə" (Adyghe: Шъачэ) which in turn is of Ubykh-Circassian origin, coming from the Ubykh name "Ş̂uaça" (Ubykh: Шъуача). It is a compound made up from the two Ubykh words "шъуа" (sea) and "ча" (side) and roughly translates to "Seaside/coast". There are other claims and theories, according to Georgian sources, the word comes from the Georgian word for the fir tree, "soch'i" (Georgian: სოჭი).

== History ==
Historical affiliations

Colchis 13th century BC–63 AD
Achaemenid Empire 511 BC–330 BC
Kingdom of Pontus 111 BC–62 BC
Roman Empire 62 BC–337 AD
Kingdom of Lazica 337–697
Byzantine Empire 697–786
Kingdom of Abkhazia 778–1008
(Georgia (country)) Kingdom of Georgia 1008–1490
Mongol Empire 1242–1259
Principality of Abkhazia 1491–1829
Ottoman Empire 1578–1829
Circassia 1829–1864
Russian Empire 1864–1917
Russian Republic 1917–1918
Russian Soviet Federative Socialist Republic 1918
(Georgia (country)) Georgian Democratic Republic 1918–1919
South Russia 1919–1920
Russian Soviet Federative Socialist Republic 1920–1922
(Soviet Union) Russian Soviet Federative Socialist Republic 1922–1991
Russian Federation 1991–present

=== Early history ===
Before the whole area was conquered by Cimmerian, Scythian and Sarmatian invaders, the Zygii (Proto-Adyghe) people lived in Lesser Abkhazia under the Kingdom of Pontus, then the Roman Empire's influence in antiquity. From the 6th to the 11th centuries, the area successively belonged to the Georgian kingdoms of Lazica and Abkhazia, who built a dozen churches within the city boundaries. The latter was unified under the single Georgian monarchy in the 11th century, forming one of the Saeristavo, known as Tskhumi extending its possessions up to Nicopsis. The Christian settlements along the coast were destroyed by the invading Alans, Khazars, Mongols and other nomadic empires whose control of the region was slight. The northern wall of an 11th-century Byzantine basilica still stands in the Loo Microdistrict.

Between the 13th and 15th centuries, the Republic of Genoa had the monopoly of the trade on the shores of the Black Sea, and established colonies and trading posts in the region of the present-day Sochi, the large ones were Layso and Costa.

=== Russian Empire ===
The coastline was occupied by Russia in 1829 as a result of the Russo-Circassian War and the Russo-Turkish War, 1828–1829; however, the Circassians did not accept the Russian control over Circassia and kept resisting the newly established Russian outposts along the Circassian coast (Adyghe: Адыгэ хы Iушъо). Provision of weapons and ammunition from abroad to the Circassians caused a diplomatic conflict between the Russian Empire and the British Empire that occurred in 1836 over the mission of the Vixen.

The Russians had no detailed knowledge of the area until Baron Feodor Tornau investigated the coastal route from Gelendzhik to Gagra, and across the mountains to Kabarda, in the 1830s. In 1838, the fort of Alexandria, renamed Navaginsky a year later, was founded at the mouth of the Sochi River as part of the Black Sea coastal line, a chain of seventeen fortifications set up to protect the area from recurring Circassian resistance. At the outbreak of the Crimean War, the garrison was evacuated from Navaginsky to prevent its capture by the Turks, who effected a landing on Cape Adler soon after.

The last battle of the Russo-Circassian War, the Battle of Qbaada, took place in 1864, and the Dakhovsky fort was established on the site of the Navaginsky fort. The end of the Caucasian War was proclaimed at Qbaada tract (modern Krasnaya Polyana) on June 2 (21 May O.S.), 1864, by the manifesto of Emperor Alexander II, read aloud by Grand Duke Michael Nikolaevich of Russia. The city was the administrative capital of the Sochinsky Okrug.

==== Circassian genocide ====
By the end of Russo-Circassian War, the Russian Empire aimed to systematically destroy the native Circassian people in the region and several atrocities were committed by the Russian forces. As a result, almost all Ubykhs and a major part of the Circassians who lived on the territory of modern Sochi, were either killed or expelled to the Ottoman Empire in the Circassian genocide. According to Russian sources, Sochi's population fell from roughly 100,000, to 98.

Starting in 1866 the coast was actively colonized by Russians, Armenians, Ukrainians, Belarusians, Greeks, Germans, Georgians and other people from inner Russia. Additionally in the late 1860s, the Adyghe, mostly of the Shapsug and Khakuchi tribes, who were hiding in the mountains started resettling on the coast.

In 1874–1891, the first Russian Orthodox church, St. Michael's Church, was constructed, and the Dakhovsky settlement was renamed Dakhovsky Posad on April 13, 1874 (O.S.). In February 1890, the Sochi Lighthouse was constructed. In 1896, the Dakhovsky Posad was renamed Sochi Posad (after the name of local river) and incorporated into the newly formed Black Sea Governorate. In 1900–1910, Sochi burgeoned into a sea resort. The first resort, "Kavkazskaya Riviera", opened on June 14, 1909 (O.S.). Sochi was granted town status in 1917.

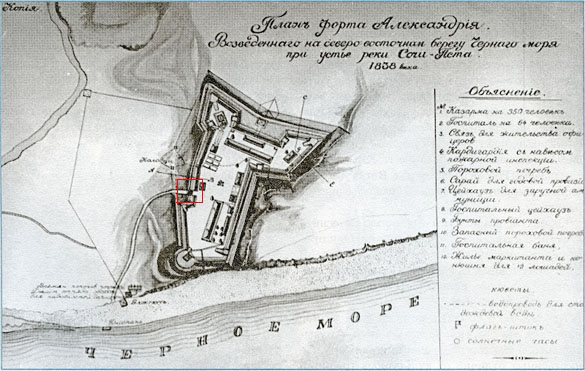
Plan of Fort Alexandria at the mouth of Sochi, which initiated the city of Sochi

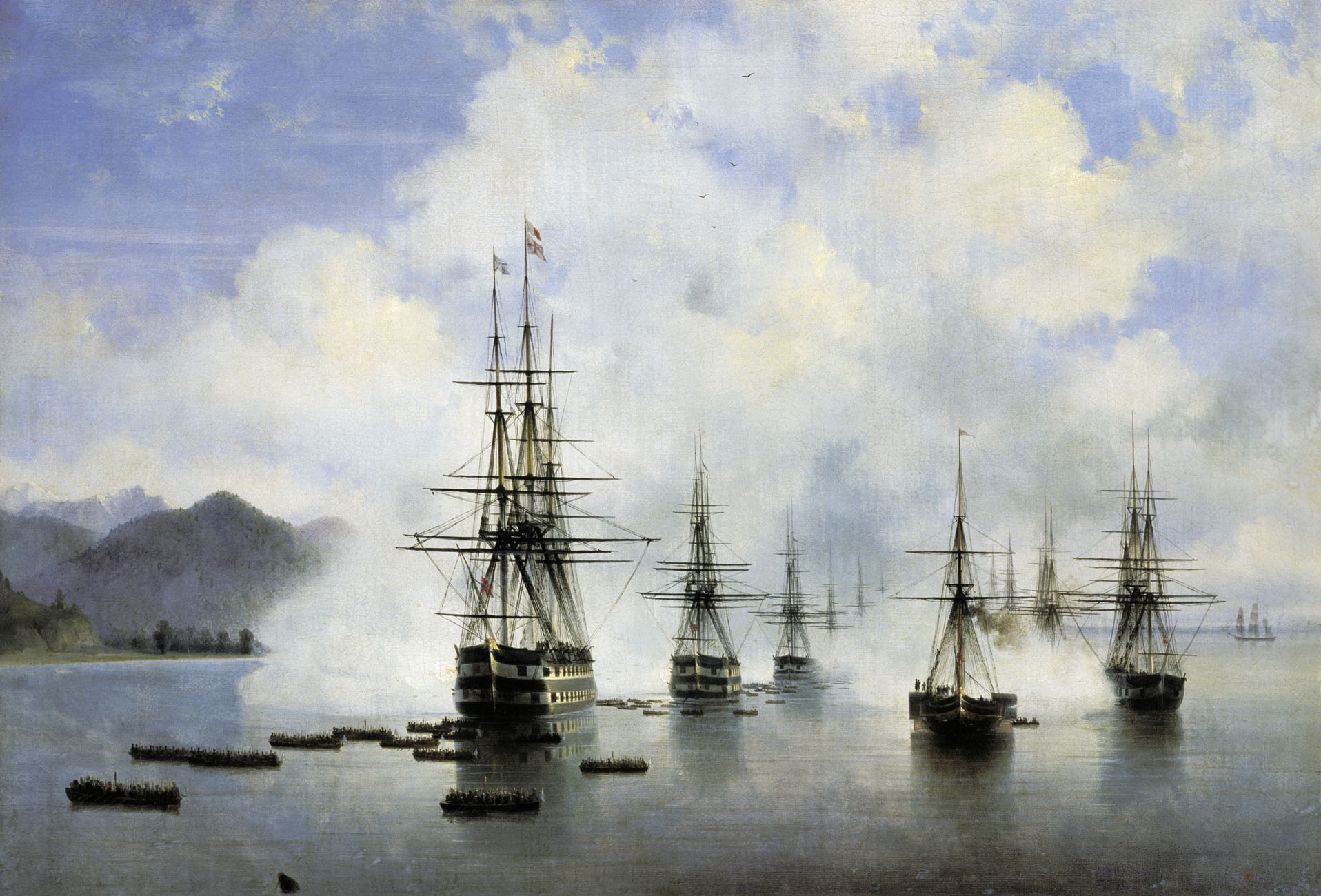
The landing of Nikolay Raevsky's squadron at Subashi, 1839 by Ivan Aivazovsky

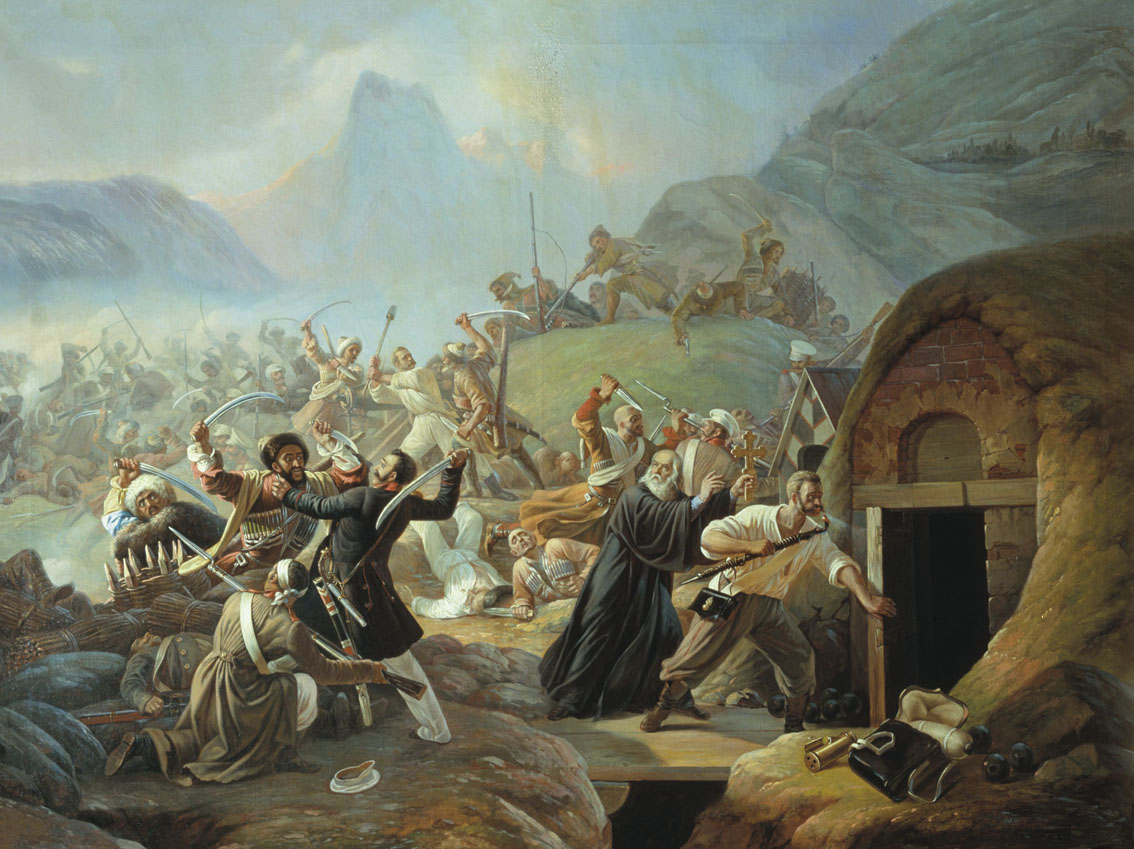
Adyghe strike on a Russian Military Fort in 1840 during the Russian-Circassians War

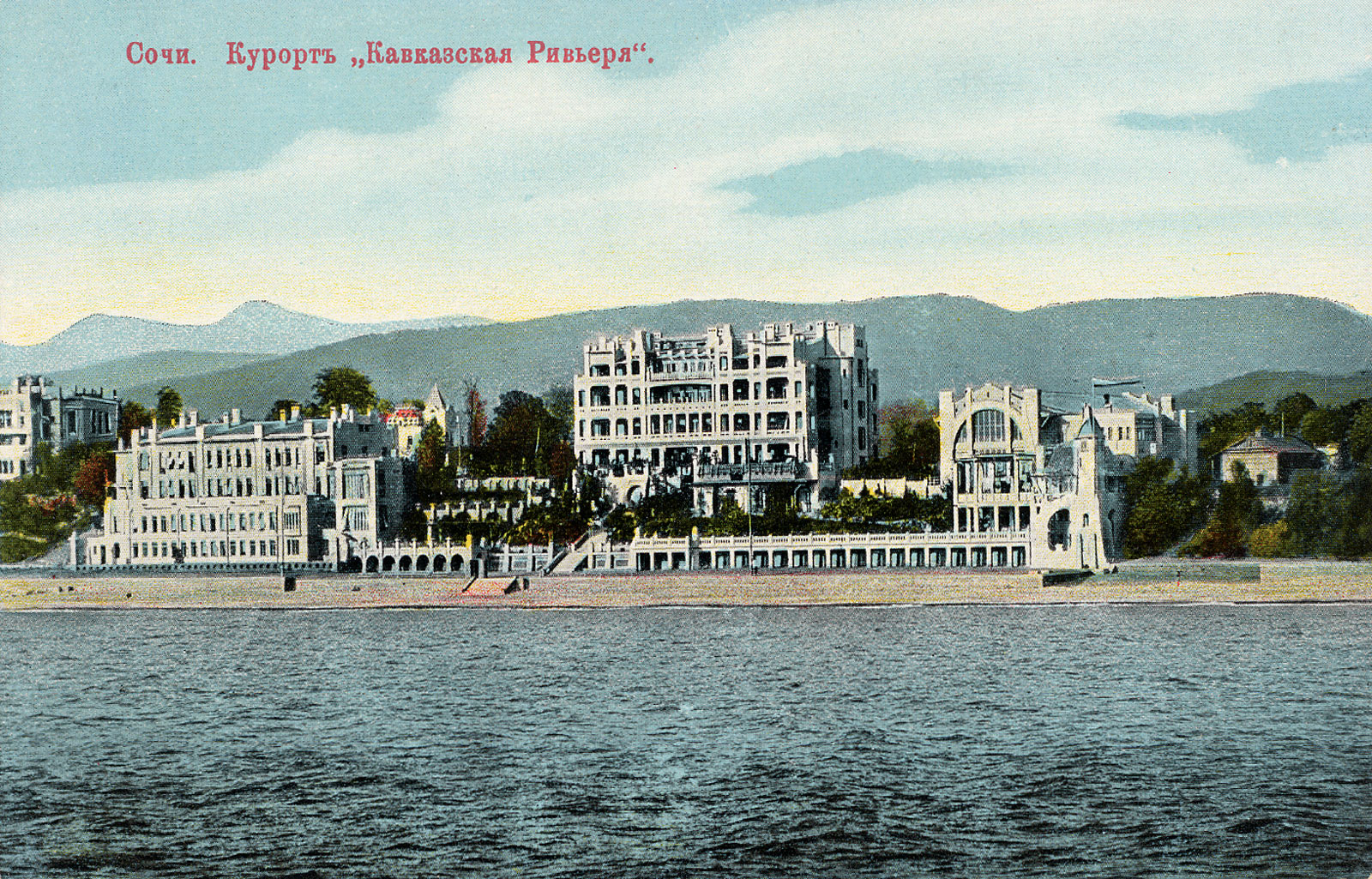
The "Kavkazskaya Riviera" resort in Sochi, ca. 1909

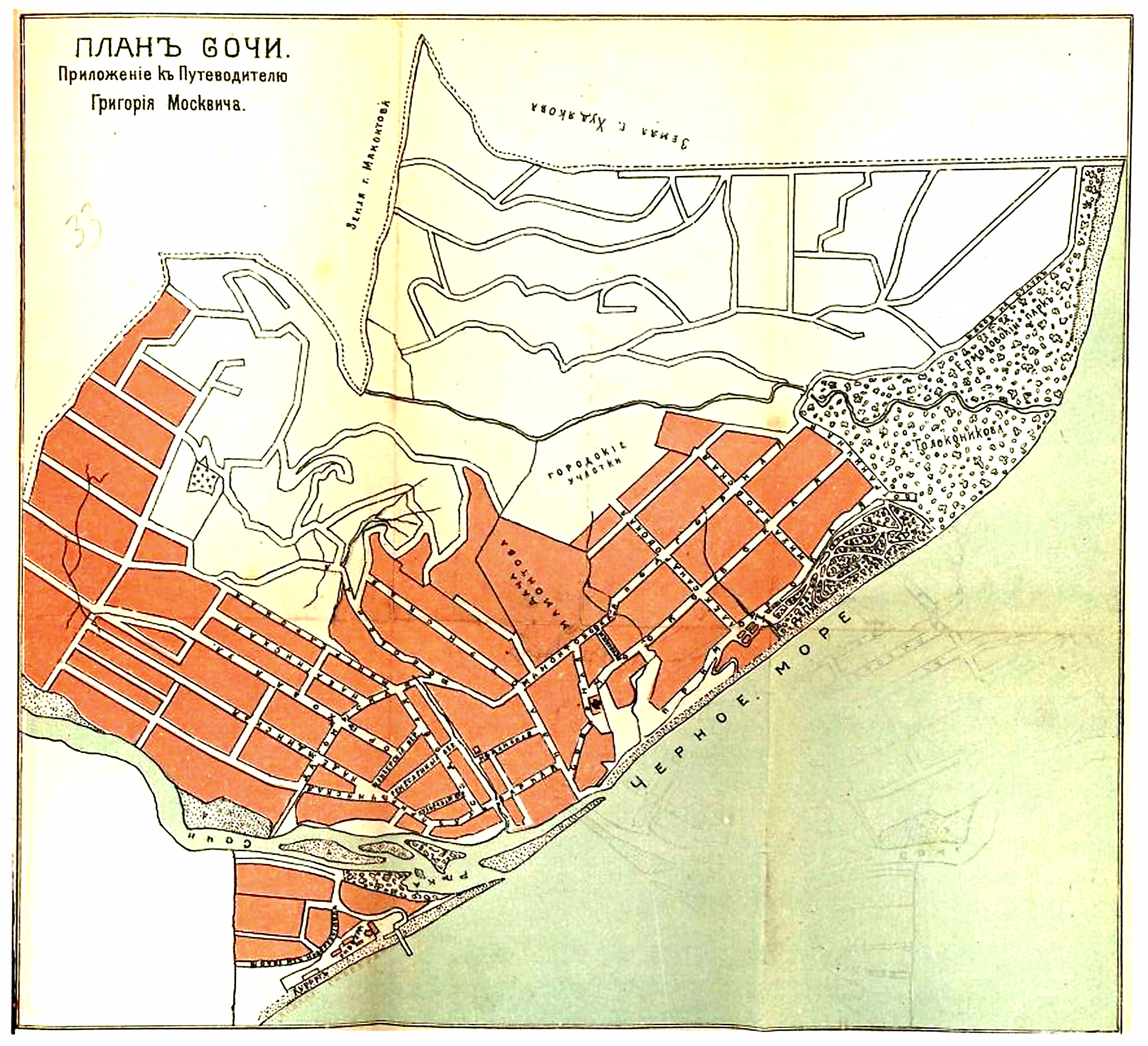
Map of Sochi in 1913 (Russian edition)

=== Soviet era ===
During the Russian Civil War, the littoral area saw sporadic armed clashes involving the Red Army, White movement forces, and the Democratic Republic of Georgia. As a result of the war Sochi has become Russian territory. In 1923, Sochi acquired one of its most distinctive features, a railway which runs from Tuapse to Georgia within a kilometer or two of the coastline. Although this branch of the Northern Caucasus Railway may appear somewhat incongruous in the setting of beaches and sanatoriums, it is still operational and vital to the region's transportation infrastructure.

Sochi was established as a fashionable resort area under Joseph Stalin, who had his favorite dacha built in the city. Stalin's study, complete with a wax statue of the leader, is now open to the public. During Stalin's reign the coast became dotted with imposing Neoclassical buildings, exemplified by the opulent Rodina and Ordzhonikidze sanatoriums. The centerpiece of this early period is Shchusev's Constructivist Institute of Rheumatology (1927–1931). The area was continuously developed until the demise of the Soviet Union.

=== Modern Russia ===
Following Russia's loss of the traditionally popular resorts of the Crimean Peninsula (transferred from the Russian SFSR to the Ukrainian SSR in 1954 by Nikita Khrushchev), Sochi emerged as the unofficial summer capital of the country. In 1961, Soviet officials decided to expand the city limits by forming a Greater Sochi which extended for 140 kilometers from the southern parts of Tuapse to Adler. In July 2005, Russia submitted a successful bid for hosting the 2014 Winter Olympics in the city, spending around $51 billion in the process.

In 2019, an area in the Imereti Lowlands was separated from Adlersky city district to form a new urban-type settlement named Sirius. It was later designated as a federal territory.

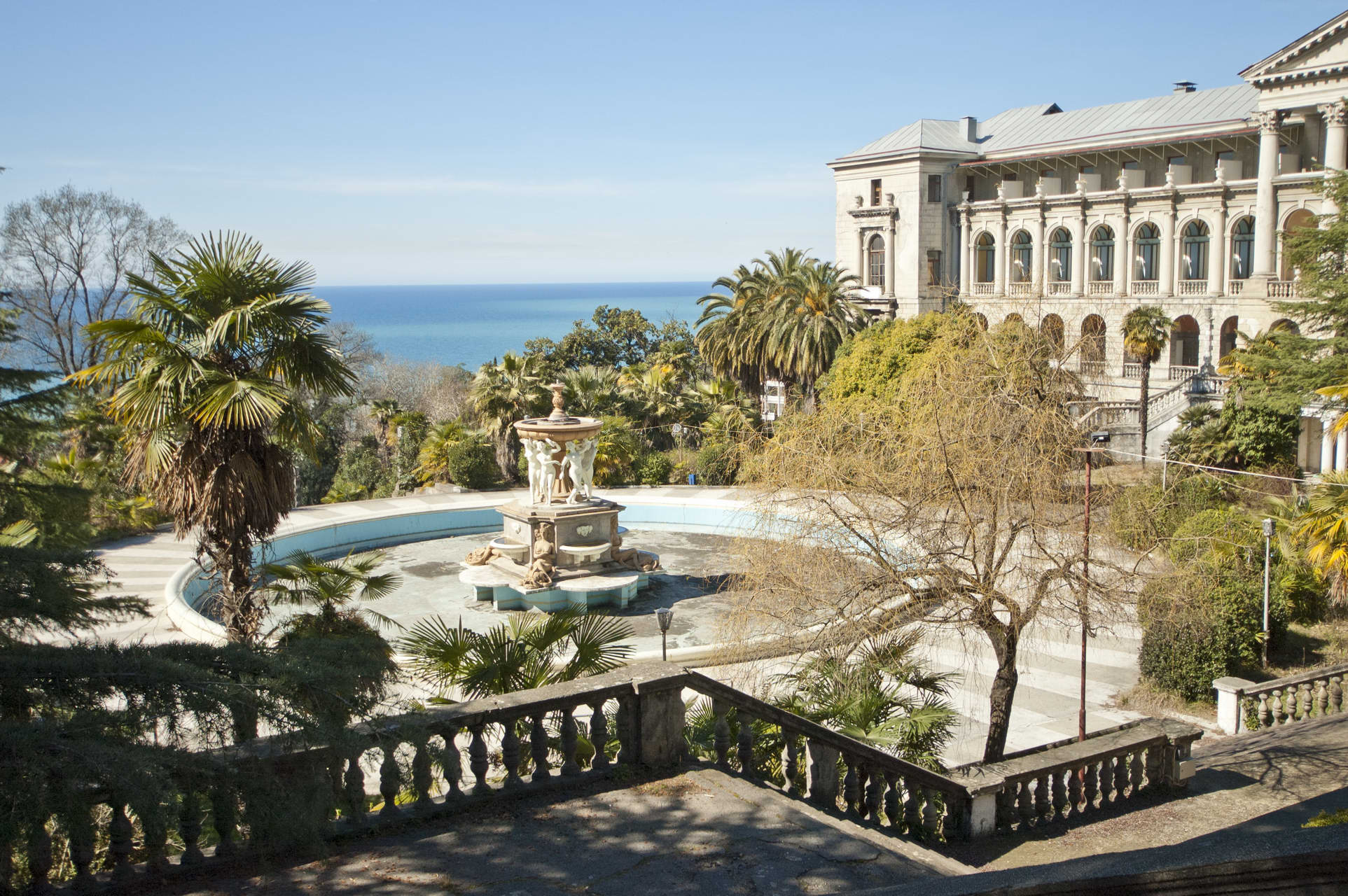
Ordzhonikidze resort, built in 1937–1955

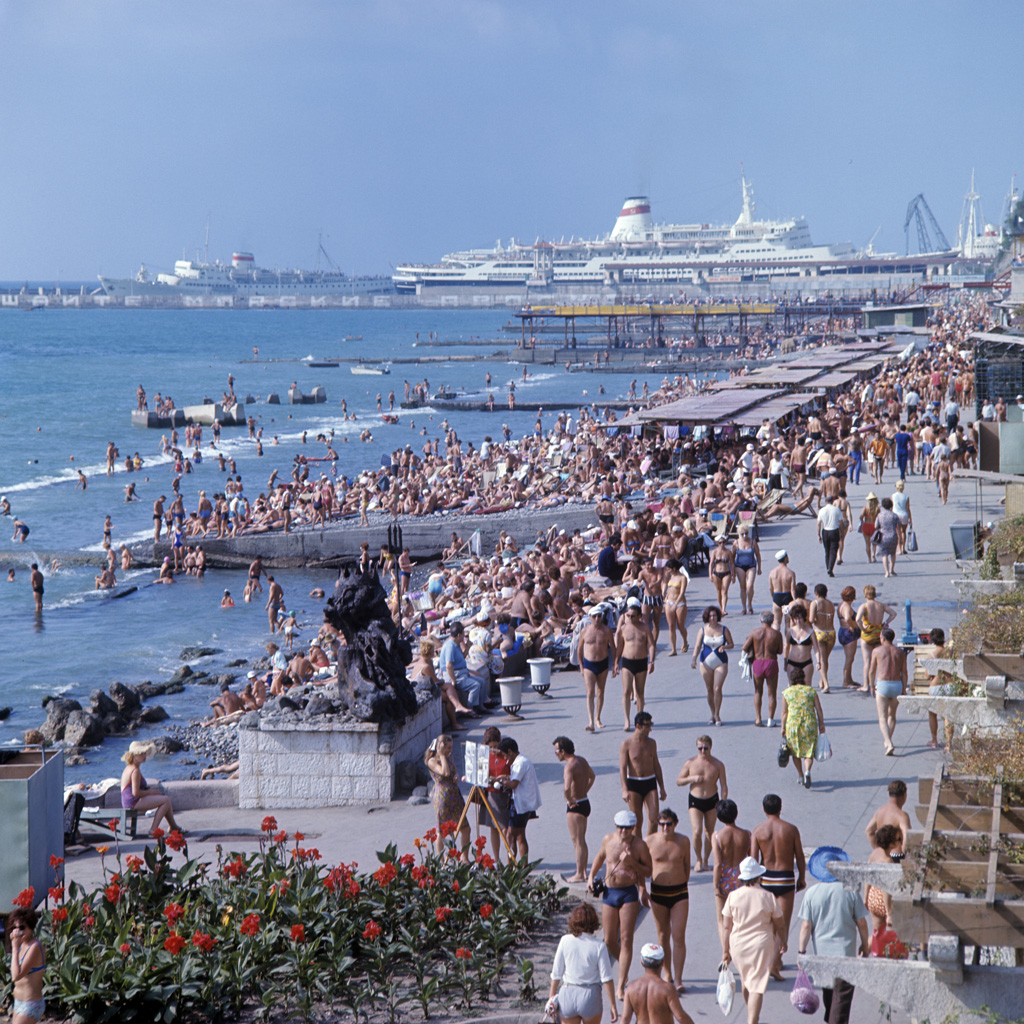
Promenade in Sochi, 1973

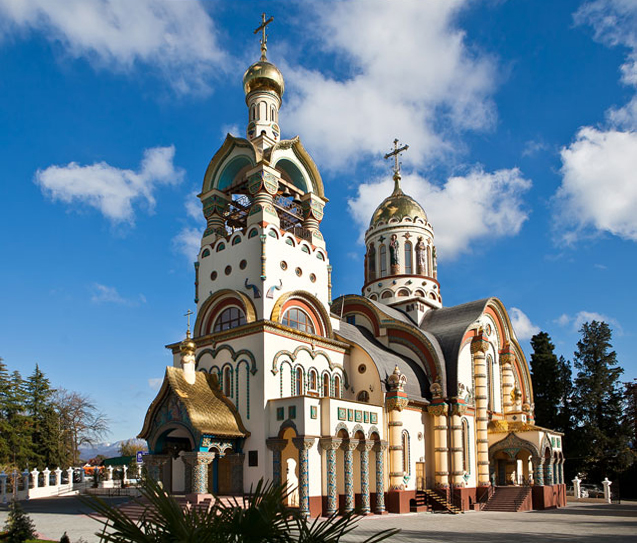
St. Vladimir Church, built in 2005–2011

On January 11, 2025, there were two earthquakes in Sochi.

== Geography ==
Greater Sochi is elongated along the Black Sea coast for 145 kilometers (90 mi). Sochi is approximately 1,603 kilometers (996 mi) from Moscow.

The city of Sochi borders with Tuapsinsky District in the northwest, with Apsheronsky District and with Maykopsky District of the Republic of Adygea in the north, with Mostovsky District in the northeast, and with Georgia/Abkhazia in the southeast. From the southwest, it is bordered by the Black Sea.

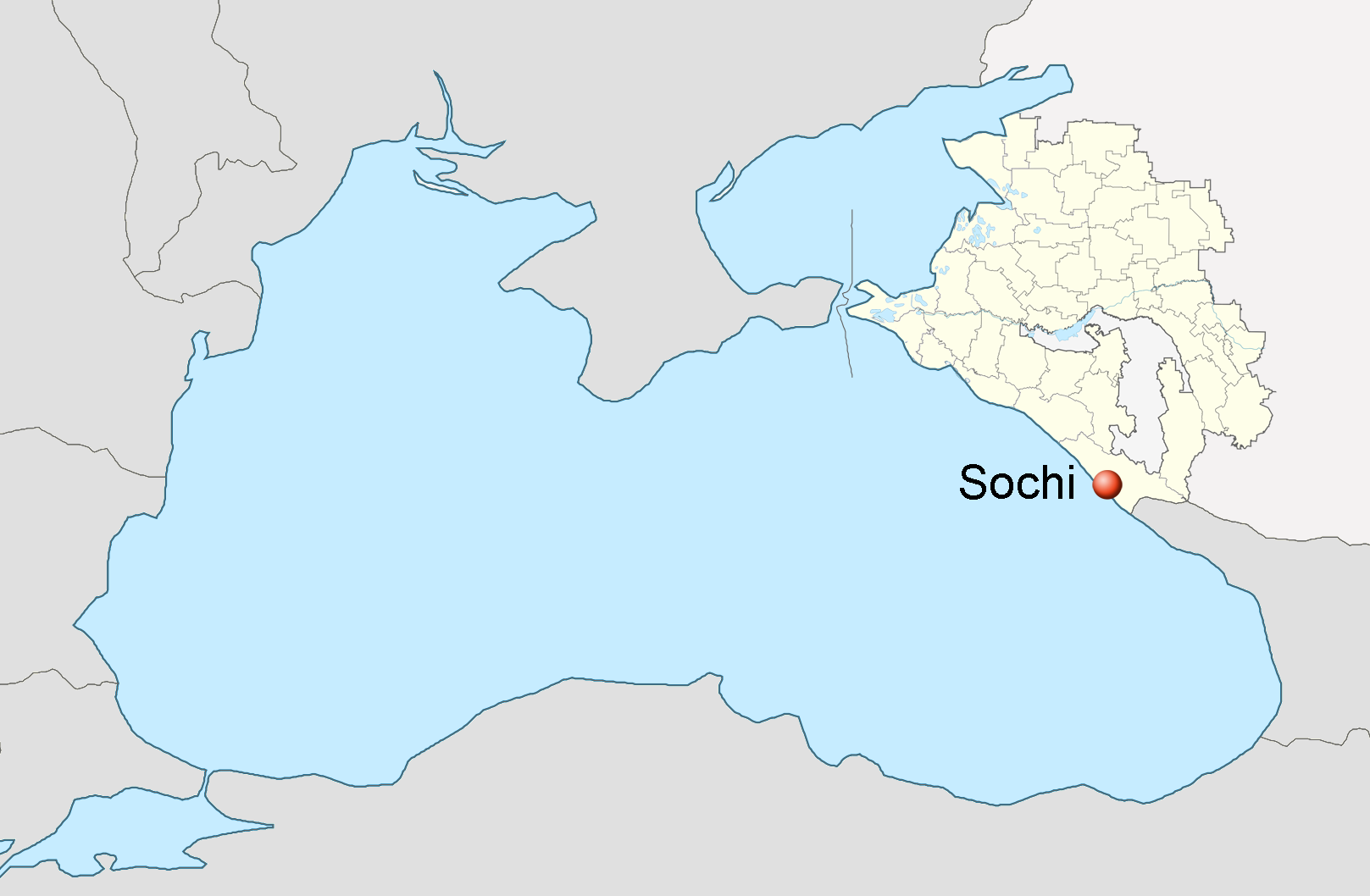
Map of Black Sea showing location of Sochi

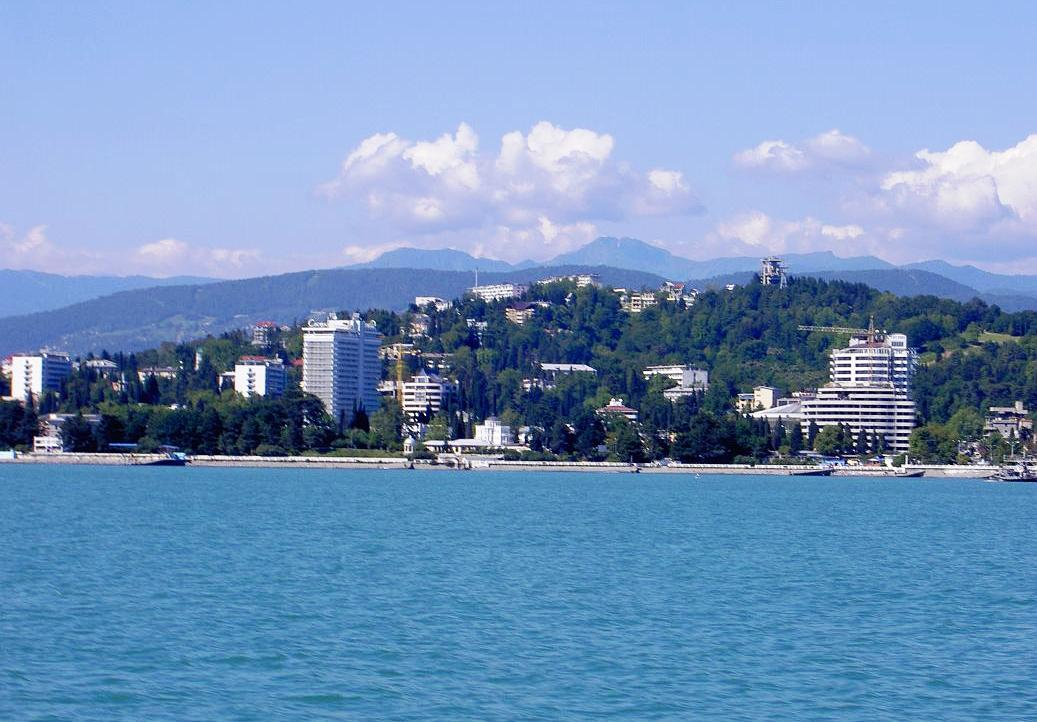
Sochi seen from the Black Sea

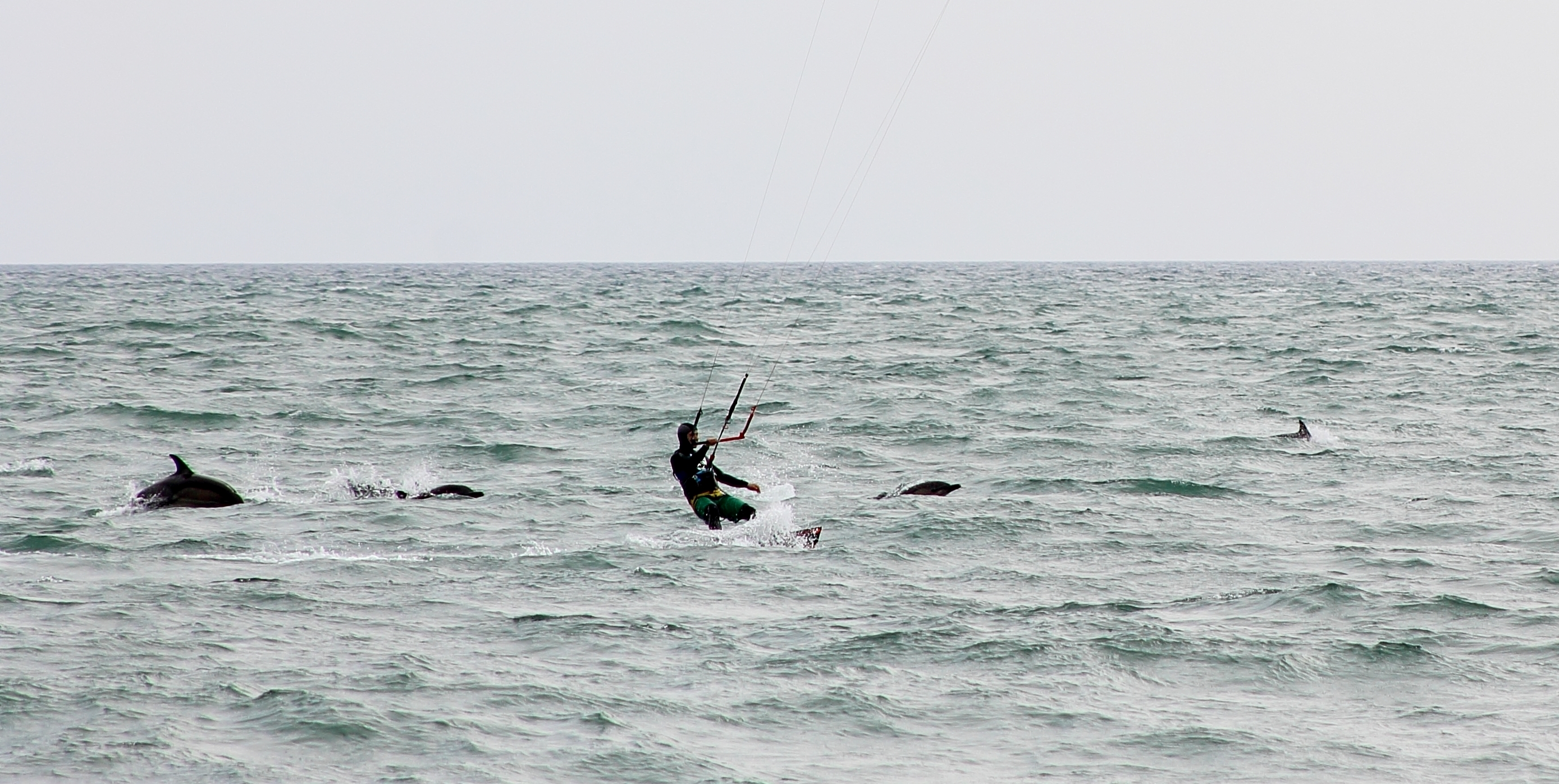
Black sea common dolphins with a kite-surfer off Sochi

The vast majority of the population of Sochi lives in a narrow strip along the coast and is organized in independent microdistricts (formerly settlements). The biggest of these microdistricts, from the northwest to the southeast, are Lazarevskoye, Loo, Dagomys, central Sochi (Tsentralny city district), Khosta, Matsesta, and Adler. The whole city is located on the slopes of the Western Caucasus which descend to the Black Sea and are cut by the rivers. The biggest rivers in Sochi are the Mzymta and the Shakhe. Other rivers include the Ashe, the Psezuapse, the Sochi, the Khosta, and the Matsesta. The Psou River makes the border with Abkhazia.

The northeastern part of the city belongs to the Caucasian Biosphere Reserve which is a World Heritage Site spanning areas in Krasnodar Krai and Adygea. Almost the whole area of the Greater Sochi, with the exception of the coast and of the area which belong to the Caucasian Biosphere Reserve, are included into Sochi National Park.

Sochi has a humid subtropical climate with mild winters (average 11 °C (52 °F) during the day and 4 °C (39 °F) at night) in the period from December to March and warm summers (average 24 °C (75 °F) during the day and 16 °C (61 °F) at night) in the period from May to October.

=== Layout and landmarks ===
Sochi is unique among larger Russian cities as having some aspects of a subtropical resort. About two million people visited Greater Sochi each summer as of 2014, when the city is home to the annual film festival "Kinotavr" and a getaway for Russia's elite.

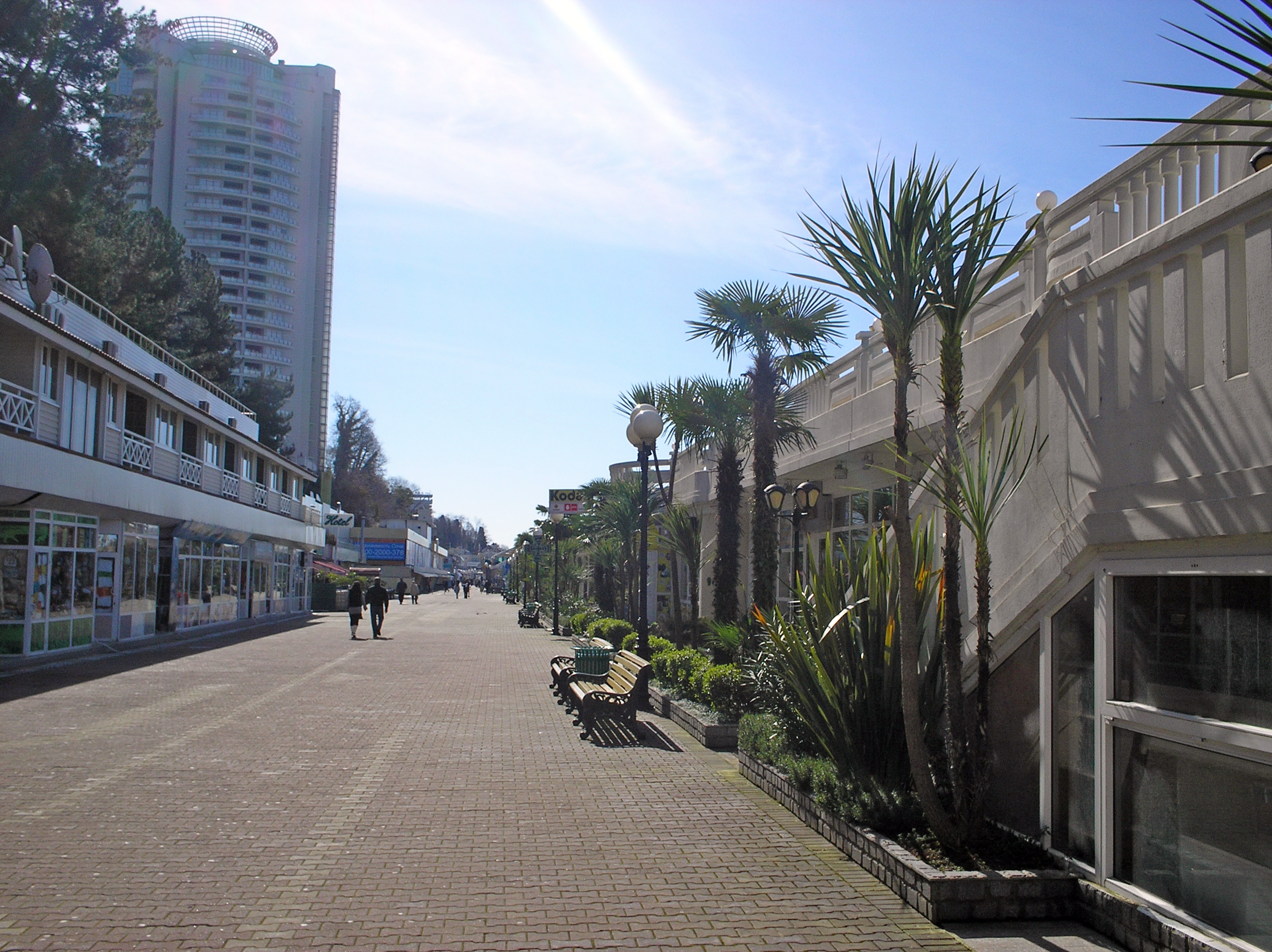
Sochi's quay

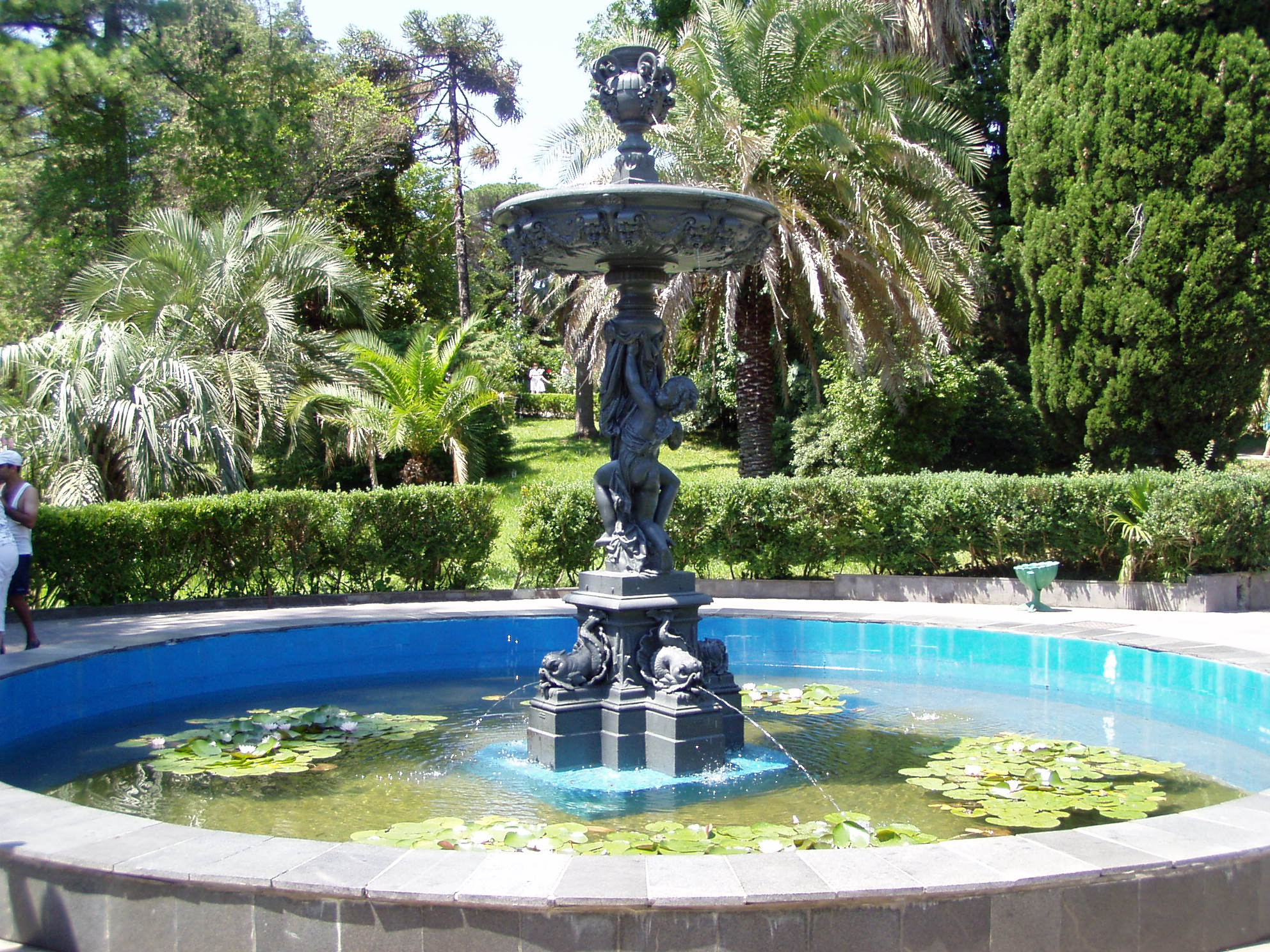
Cupid fountain in Arboretum

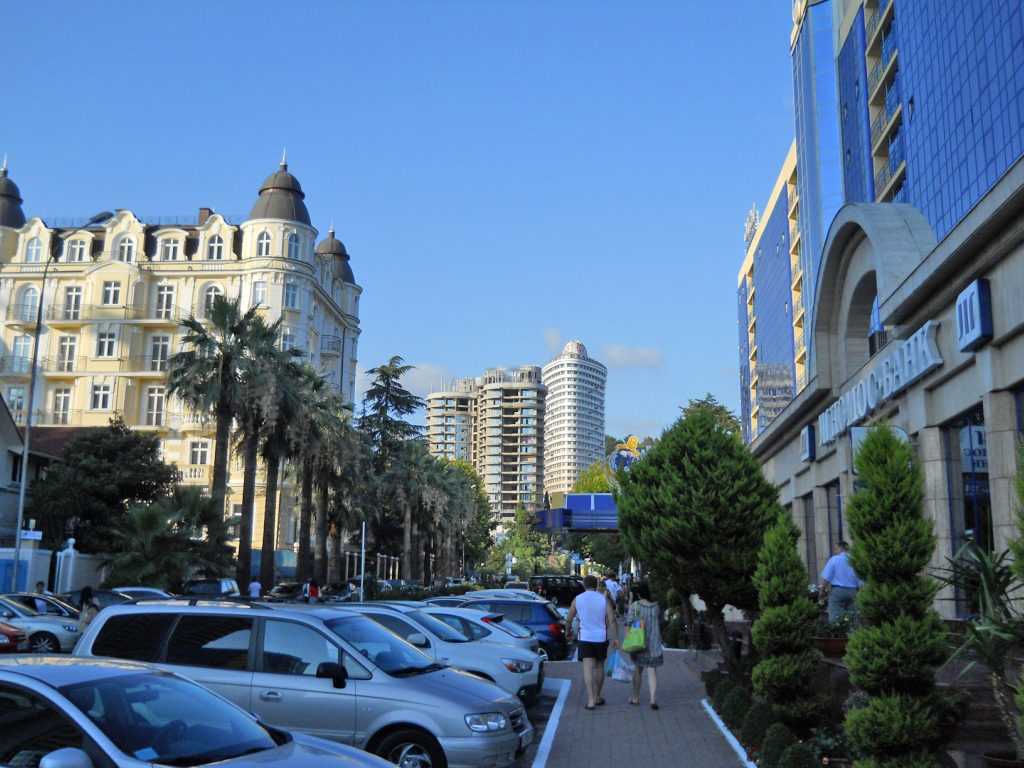
Hotels

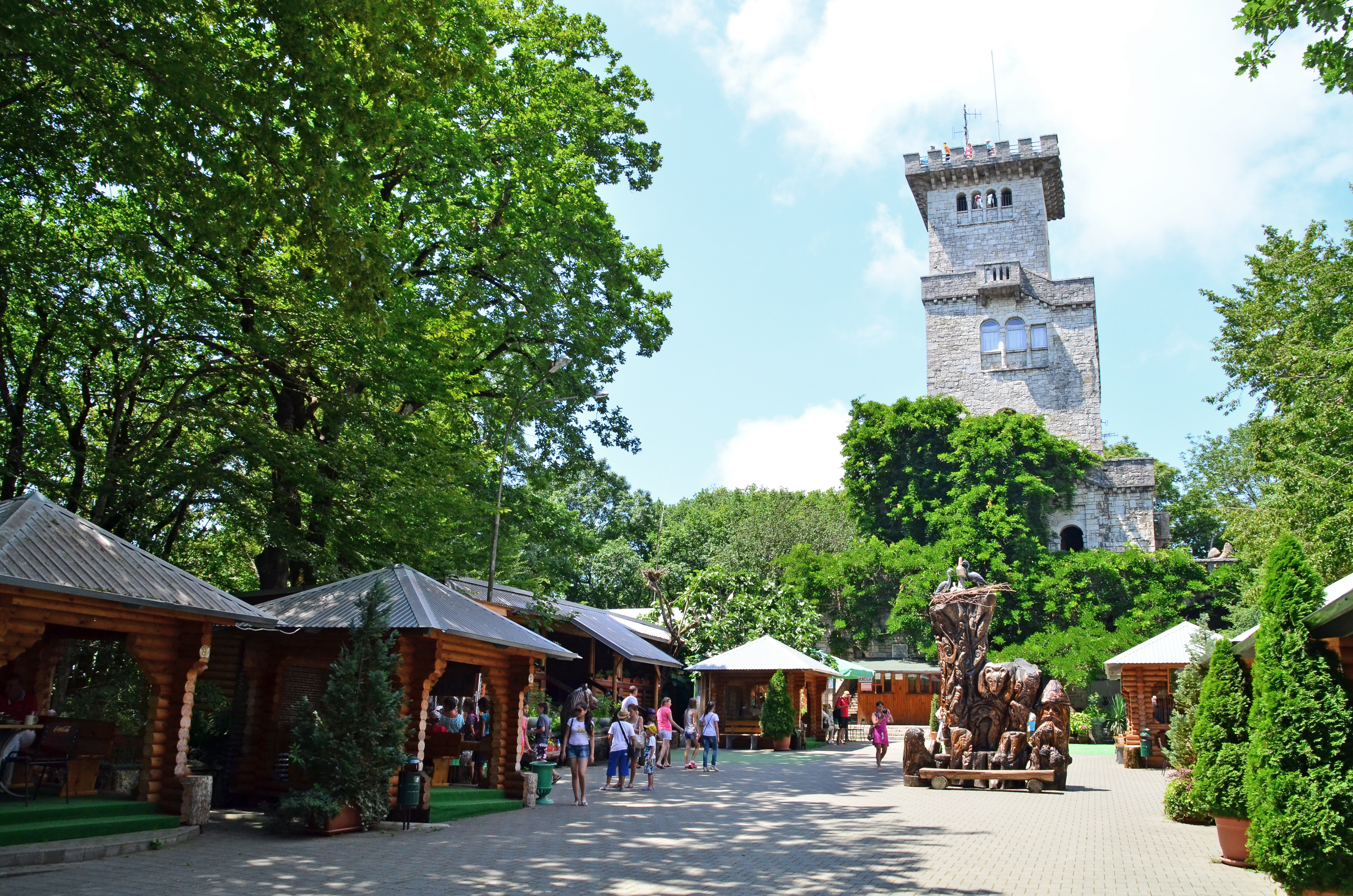
Mount Akhun

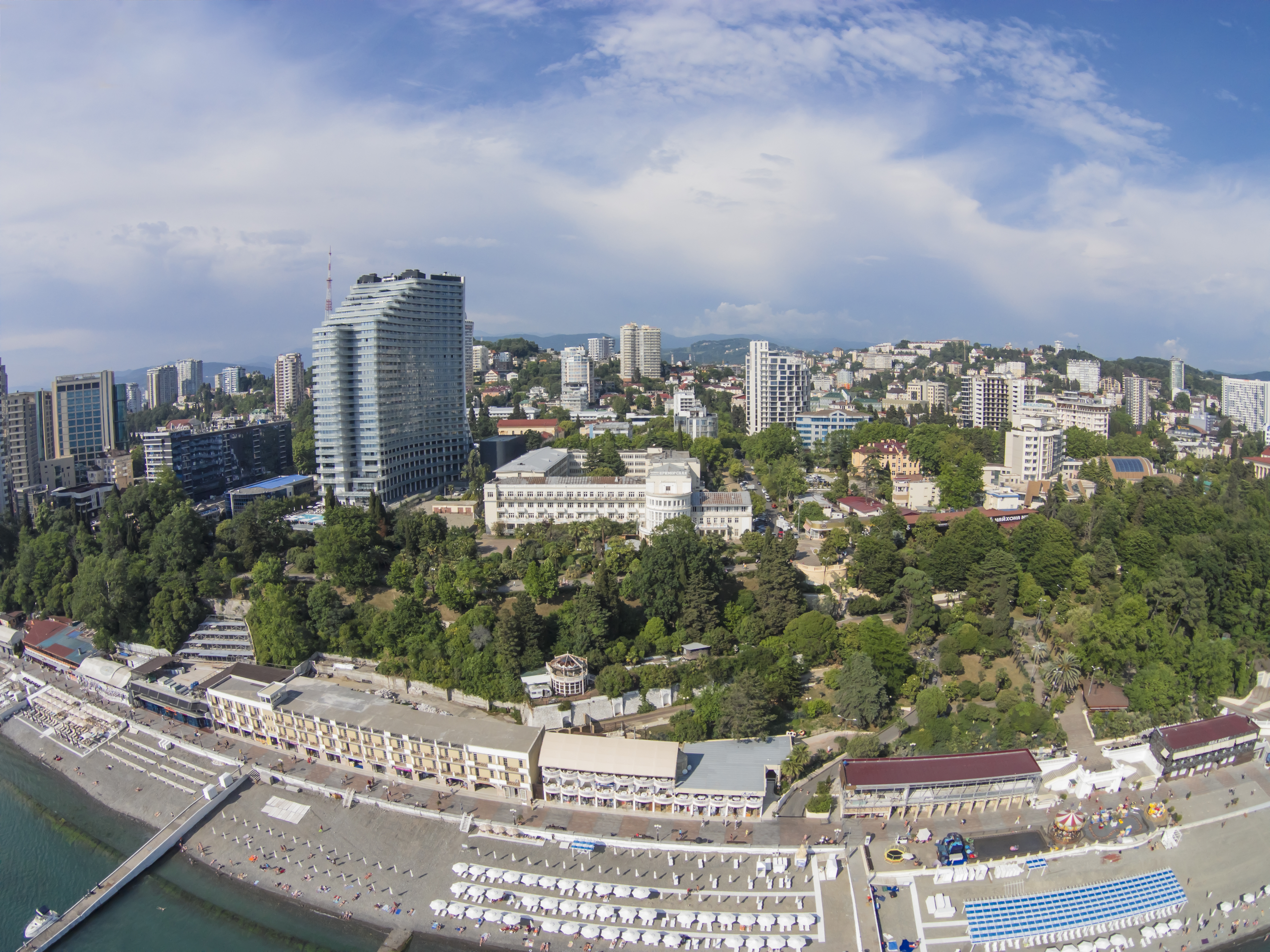
Aerial view of Sochi

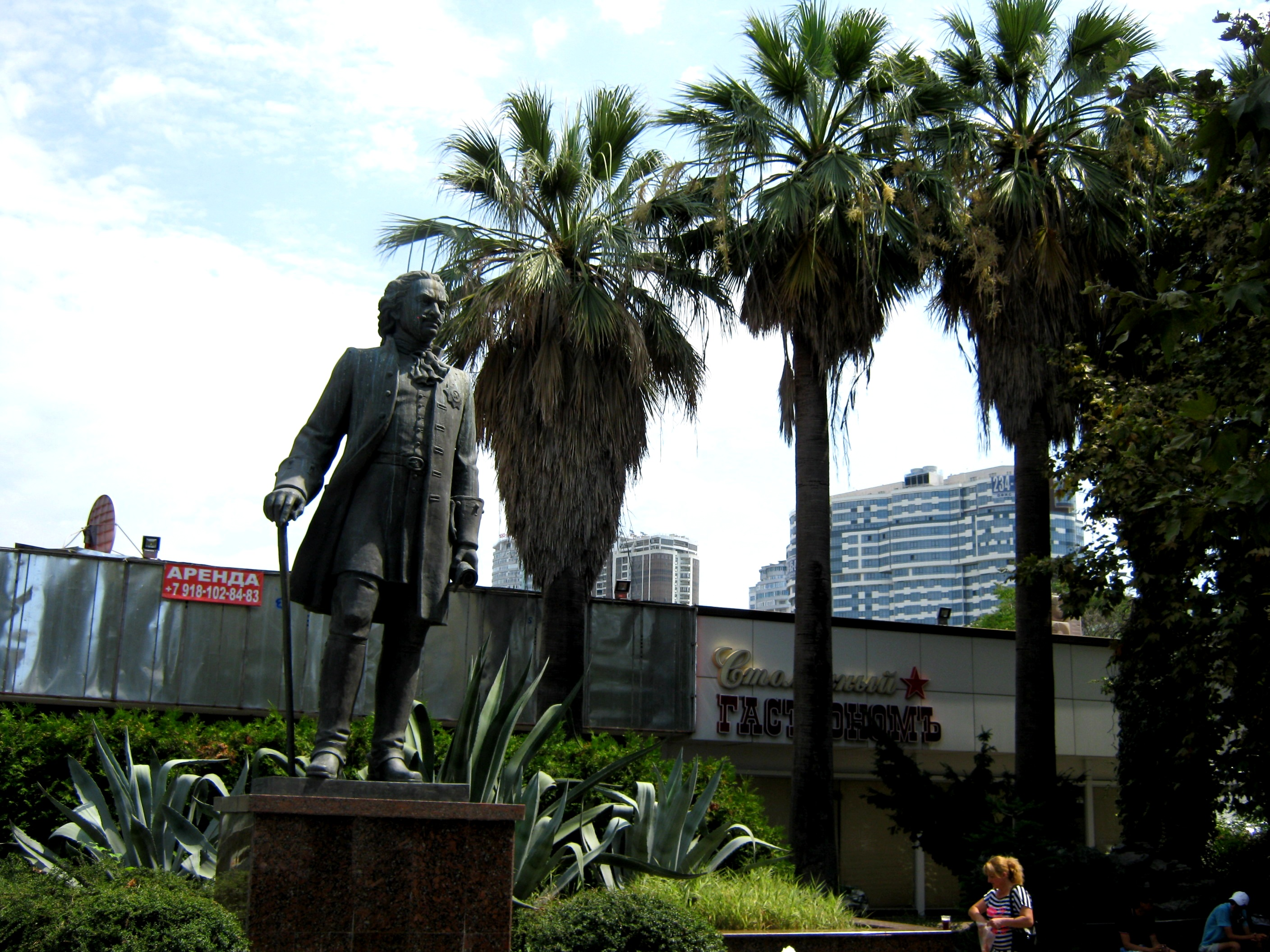
Monument to Peter I in the seaport berth

A UNESCO World Heritage Site, the 2,957 square kilometers (731,000 acres) Caucasus Nature Reserve, lies just north from the city. Sochi also has the region's most northerly tea plantations.

=== Climate ===
Sochi has a humid subtropical climate (Köppen climate classification Cfa),. Its average annual temperature is 18.9 °C (66.0 °F) during the day and 11.5 °C (52.7 °F) at night. In the coldest months—January and February—the average temperature is about 10 °C (50 °F) during the day, above 3 °C (37 °F) at night and the average sea temperature is about 9 °C (48 °F). In the hottest months—July and August—the temperature typically ranges from 25 to 29 °C (77 to 84 °F) during the day, about 20 °C (68 °F) at night and the average sea temperature is about 23–27 °C (73–81 °F).

Yearly sunshine hours are around 2,200. Generally, the summer season lasts three months, from June to September. Two months—April and November—are transitional; sometimes temperatures reach 20 °C (68 °F), with an average temperature of around 16 °C (61 °F) during the day and 9 °C (48 °F) at night. December, January, February and March are the coldest months, with an average temperature (for these four months) of 11 °C (52 °F) during the day and 4 °C (39 °F) at night. Average annual precipitation is about 1,700 millimeters (67 in).

Sochi is situated on the same latitude as Nice but strong cold winds from the north make winters less warm. In fact, temperatures drop below freezing every winter. The highest temperature recorded was 39.4 °C (102.9 °F), on July 30, 2000, and the lowest temperature recorded was −13.4 °C (7.9 °F) on January 25, 1892. Sochi lies at 8b/9a hardiness zone, so the city supports different types of palm trees. Examples of palms that are common in Sochi are the Sabal palmetto, Trachycarpus fortunei, and Phoenix canariensis.

Climate data for Sochi (1991–2020 normals, extremes 1870–present)
Month	Jan	Feb	Mar	Apr	May	Jun	Jul	Aug	Sep	Oct	Nov	Dec	Year
Record high °C (°F)	22.4 (72.3)	23.5 (74.3)	30.0 (86.0)	33.7 (92.7)	34.7 (94.5)	35.2 (95.4)	39.4 (102.9)	38.5 (101.3)	36.0 (96.8)	32.1 (89.8)	29.1 (84.4)	23.5 (74.3)	39.4 (102.9)
Mean daily maximum °C (°F)	9.9 (49.8)	10.4 (50.7)	12.7 (54.9)	17.0 (62.6)	21.2 (70.2)	25.4 (77.7)	27.9 (82.2)	28.6 (83.5)	25.2 (77.4)	20.7 (69.3)	15.6 (60.1)	12.0 (53.6)	18.9 (66.0)
Daily mean °C (°F)	6.3 (43.3)	6.5 (43.7)	8.6 (47.5)	12.3 (54.1)	16.6 (61.9)	20.9 (69.6)	23.7 (74.7)	24.3 (75.7)	20.5 (68.9)	16.2 (61.2)	11.4 (52.5)	8.3 (46.9)	14.6 (58.3)
Mean daily minimum °C (°F)	3.8 (38.8)	3.7 (38.7)	5.6 (42.1)	9.0 (48.2)	13.3 (55.9)	17.4 (63.3)	20.0 (68.0)	20.7 (69.3)	16.9 (62.4)	13.1 (55.6)	8.5 (47.3)	5.7 (42.3)	11.5 (52.7)
Record low °C (°F)	−13.4 (7.9)	−12.6 (9.3)	−7.0 (19.4)	−5.0 (23.0)	3.0 (37.4)	7.1 (44.8)	12.6 (54.7)	10.4 (50.7)	2.7 (36.9)	−3.2 (26.2)	−5.4 (22.3)	−8.3 (17.1)	−13.4 (7.9)
Average precipitation mm (inches)	177 (7.0)	134 (5.3)	133 (5.2)	109 (4.3)	107 (4.2)	95 (3.7)	120 (4.7)	106 (4.2)	140 (5.5)	177 (7.0)	175 (6.9)	178 (7.0)	1,651 (65.0)
Average extreme snow depth cm (inches)	1 (0.4)	1 (0.4)	0 (0)	0 (0)	0 (0)	0 (0)	0 (0)	0 (0)	0 (0)	0 (0)	0 (0)	0 (0)	1 (0.4)
Average rainy days	19	18	18	18	16	14	11	10	13	15	17	20	189
Average snowy days	6	6	3	0.3	0	0	0	0	0	0	1	4	20
Average relative humidity (%)	73	72	72	75	79	79	79	78	76	76	74	72	75
Mean monthly sunshine hours	96	105	145	161	221	258	279	281	226	195	121	86	2,174
Source 1: Pogoda.ru.net
Source 2: NOAA (sun, 1961–1990)

Beach climate data for Sochi
Month	Jan	Feb	Mar	Apr	May	Jun	Jul	Aug	Sep	Oct	Nov	Dec	Year
Average sea temperature °C (°F)	10.6 (51.08)	9.4 (48.92)	9.4 (48.92)	11.5 (52.7)	17.3 (63.14)	22.9 (73.22)	25.6 (78.08)	26.9 (80.42)	24.7 (76.46)	20.5 (68.9)	16.4 (61.52)	12.8 (55.04)	17.3 (63.2)

== Administrative and municipal status and city divisions ==
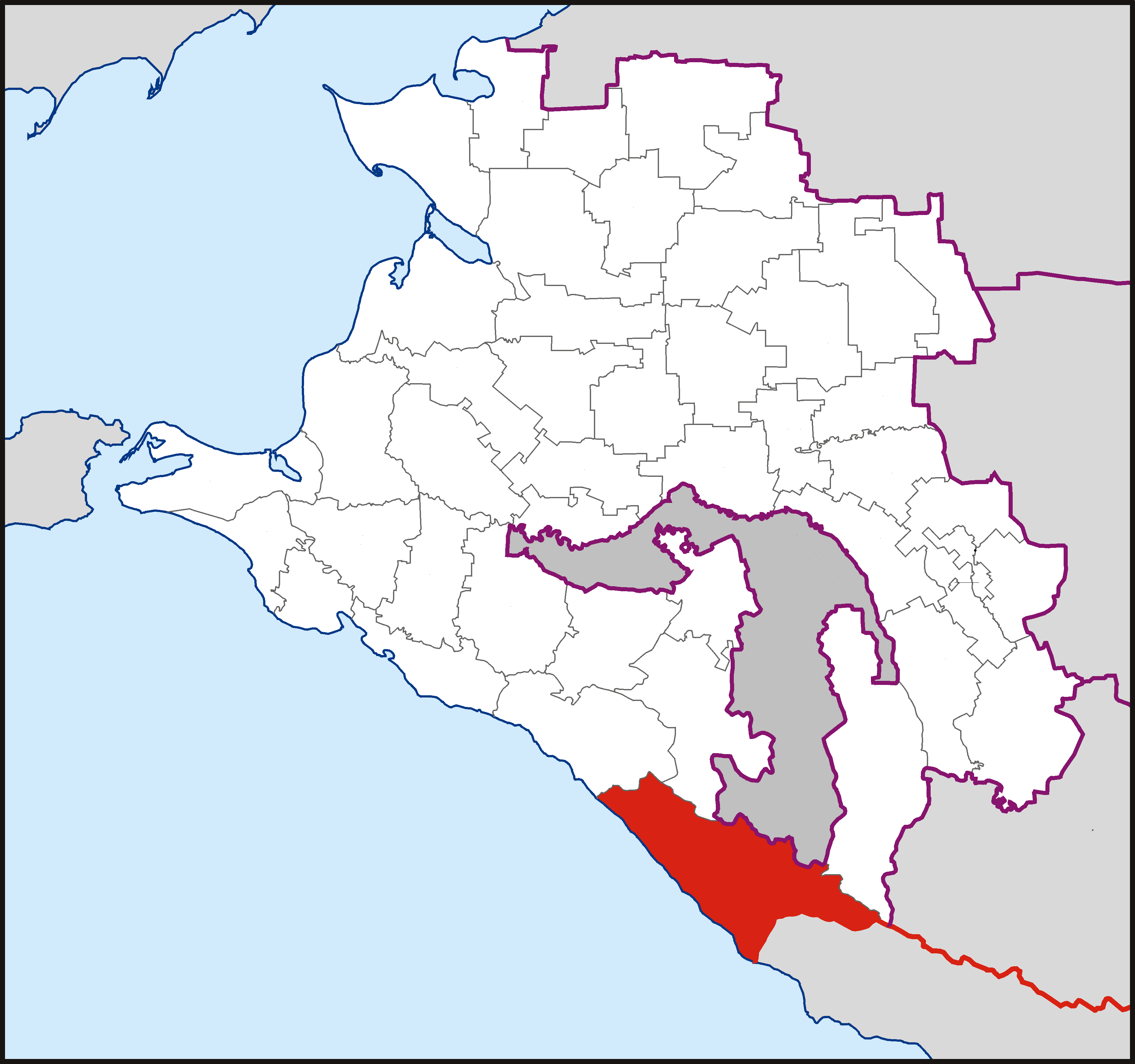
Sochi Urban Okrug on the map of Krasnodar Krai

Within the framework of administrative divisions, it is, together with one urban-type settlement (Krasnaya Polyana) and seventy-nine rural localities, incorporated as the City of Sochi—an administrative unit with the status equal to that of the districts. As a municipal division, the City of Sochi is incorporated as Sochi Urban Okrug.

Sochi is administratively subdivided into four city districts: Tsentralny city district, Lazarevsky city district, Khostinsky city district, and Adlersky city district. Tsentralny city district, comprising the central portion of, is by far the smallest out of four in terms of the area, and the other three have comparable areas, with Lazarevsky city district being the biggest. In terms of the population, Tsentralny city district is approximately twice as big as each of the other three city districts.

city district	Area (km^{2})	Population census 2010	#
Tsentralny	32	137,677	1
Khostinsky	374	65,229	2
Lazarevsky	1,744	63,894	3
Adlersky	1,352	76,534	4

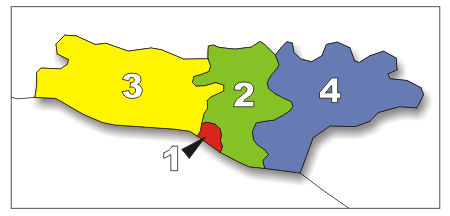
city districts numbered

=== Tsentralny city district ===
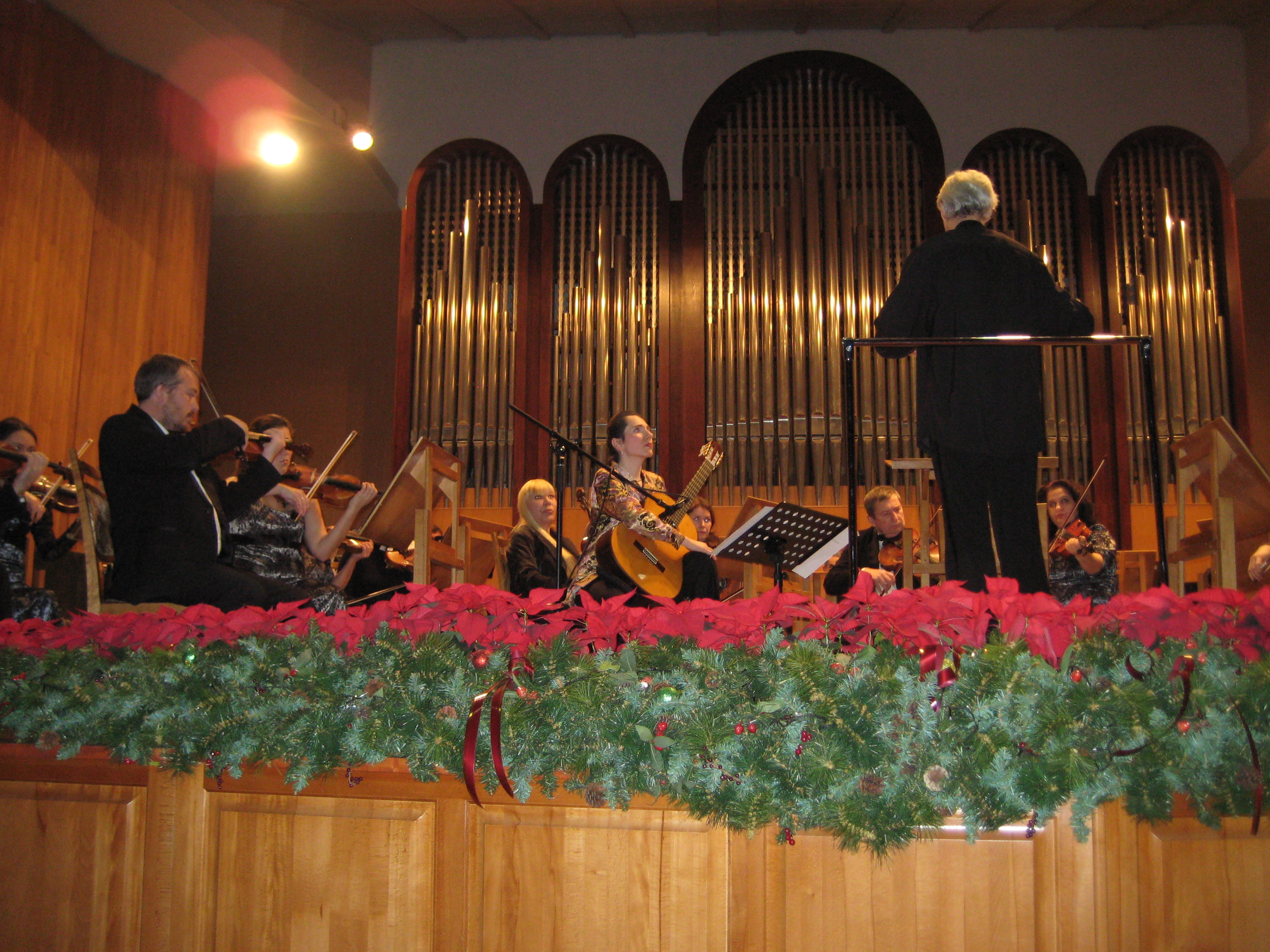
The Sochi Symphony Orchestra conducted by Oleg Soldatov during a concert with the Austrian guitarist Johanna Beisteiner at Organ and Chamber Music Hall in Sochi (December 13, 2013)

Tsentralny city district, or central Sochi, covers an area of 32 square kilometers (12 sq mi) and, as of the 2010 Census, has a population of 137,677. The highlights include:

- Michael Archangel Cathedral, a diminutive church built in 1873–1891 to Kaminsky's designs in order to commemorate the victorious conclusion of the Caucasian War.
- The red-granite Archangel Column, erected in 2006 in memory of the Russian soldiers fallen in Sochi during the Caucasian War. It is capped by a 7-metre bronze statue of Sochi's patron saint, Michael the Archangel.
- Sochi Arboretum, a large botanical garden with tropical trees from many countries, and the Mayors Alleé—a landscape avenue of palm trees planted by mayors from cities around the world.
- The Tree of Friendship, a hybrid citrus tree planted in 1934 in the Subtropical Botanic Garden. Since 1940 numerous citrus cultivars from foreign countries have been grafted onto this tree as a token of friendship and peace. The associated Friendship Tree Garden Museum has a collection of 20,000 commemorative presents from around the world.

=== Lazarevsky city district ===
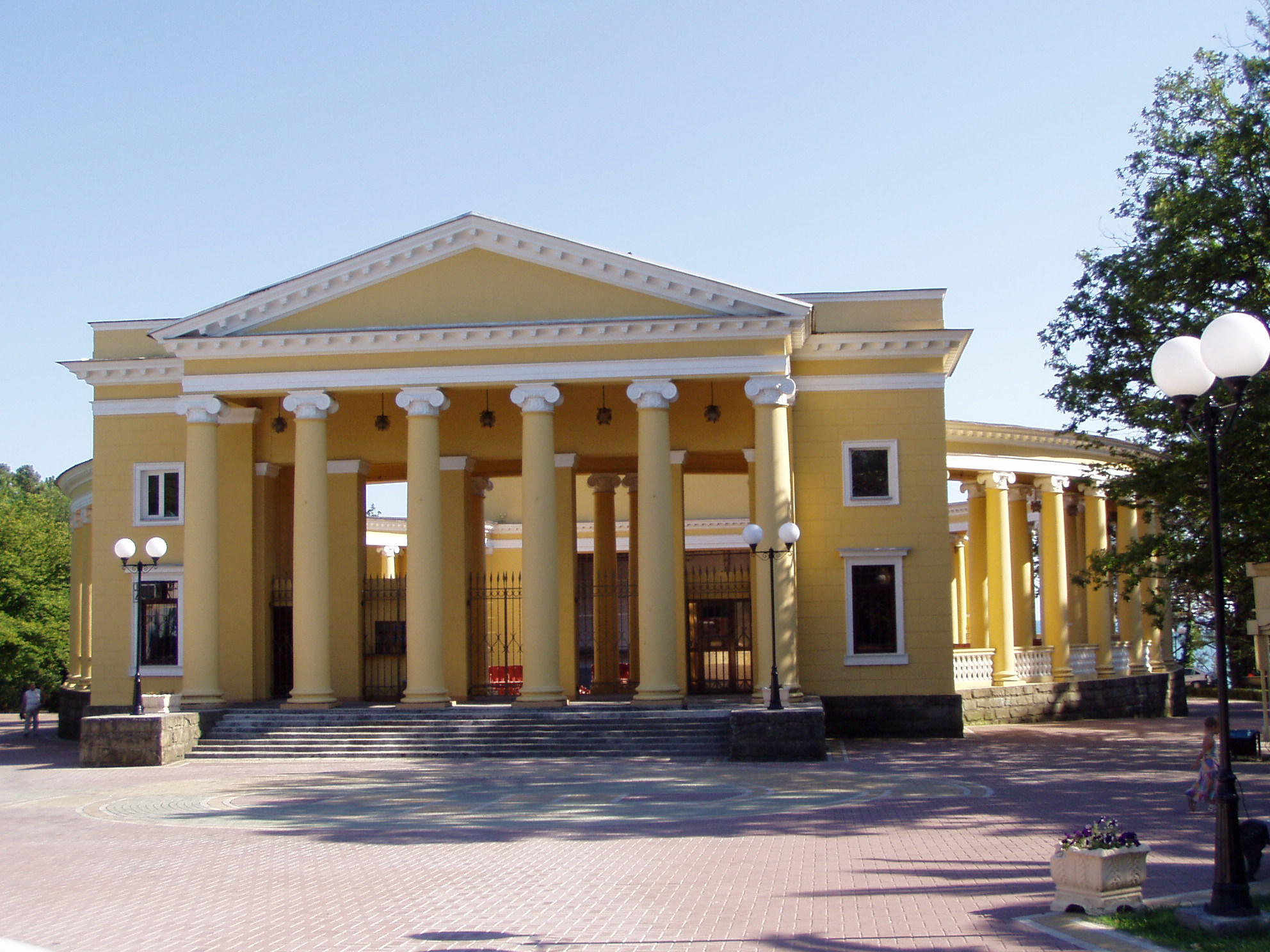
The Summer Theater

Lazarevsky city district lies to the northwest from the city center; the 2010 Census showed the population of 63,894 people. It is the largest city district by area, covering some 1,744 square kilometers (673 sq mi) and comprising several microdistricts:

- Lazarevskoye, 59 km (37 mi) from the city center, contains a delphinarium, an old church (1903), and a new church (1999). The settlement was founded as a Russian military outpost in 1839 and was named after Admiral Mikhail Lazarev.
- Loo, 18 km (11 mi) from the city center, was once owned by Princes Loov, a noble Abkhazian family. The district contains the ruins of a medieval church, founded in the 8th century, rebuilt in the 11th century, and converted into a fortress in the Late Middle Ages.
- Dagomys, 18 km (11 mi) from the city center, has been noted for its botanical garden, established by order of Nicholas II, as well as tea plantations and factories. A sprawling hotel complex was opened there in 1982. Dagomys adjoins Bocharov Ruchey, a dacha built for Kliment Voroshilov in the 1950s, but later upgraded into a country residence of the President of Russia, where he normally spends his vacations and often confers with leaders of other states.
- Golovinka is a historic location at the mouth of the Shakhe River. Formerly marking the border between the Ubykhs and the Shapsugs, the settlement was noted by Italian travelers of the 17th century as Abbasa. On May 3, 1838, it was the site of the Subashi landing of the Russians, who proceeded to construct Fort Golovinsky where many convicted Decembrists used to serve. The fort was intentionally destroyed by Russian forces at the beginning of the Crimean War, so as to avoid its capture by the enemy.
- Fort Godlik, of which little remains, had a turbulent history. It was built at the mouth of the Godlik River in the Byzantine period (5th to 8th centuries), was destroyed by the Khazars and revived by the Genoese in the High Middle Ages.

=== Khostinsky city district ===
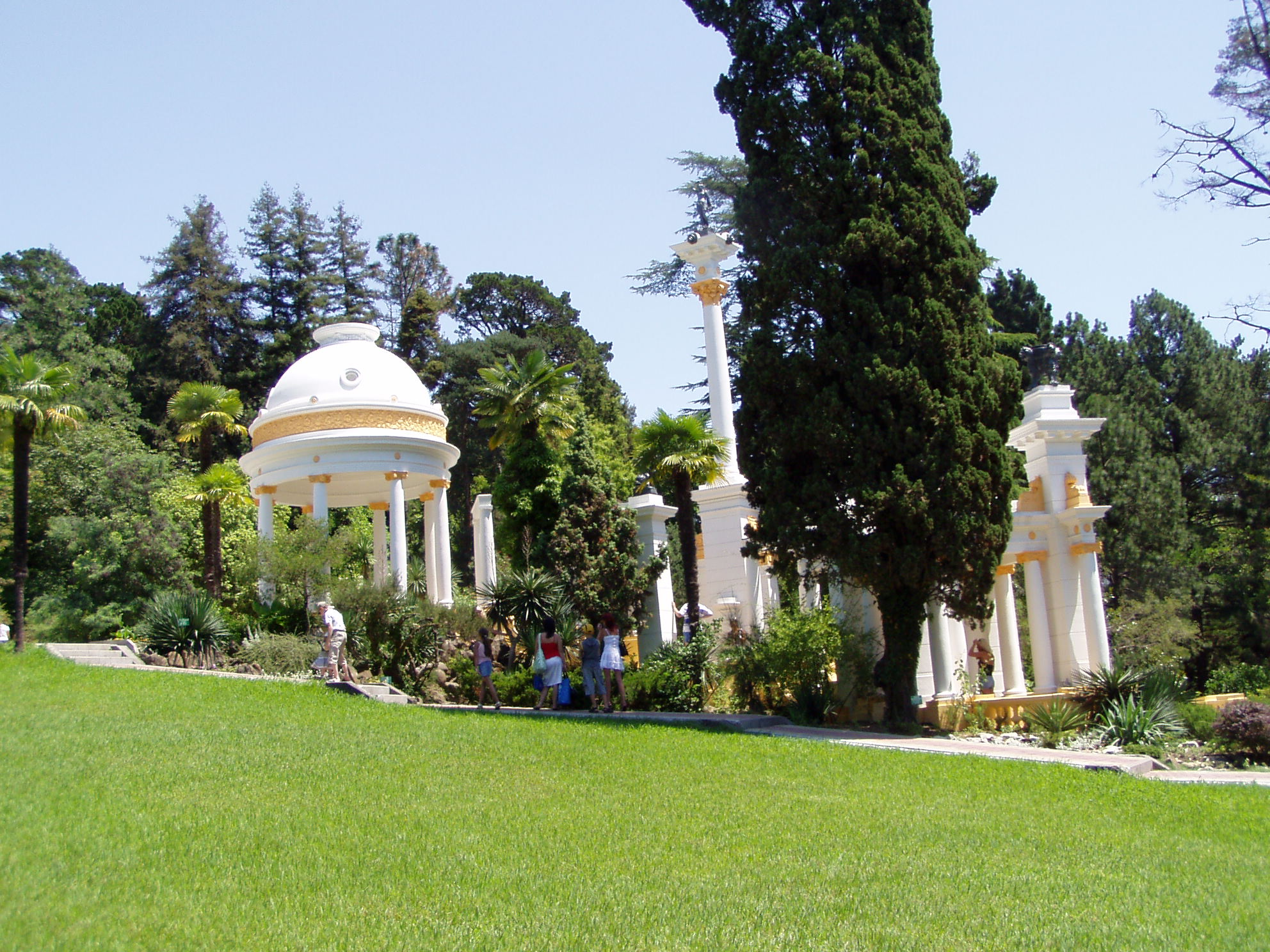
Sochi Arboretum

Khostinsky city district, sprawling to the southeast from the city center, occupies approximately 374 square kilometers (144 sq mi), with a population of 65,229 as of the 2010 Census. The district is traversed by many rivulets which give their names to the microdistricts of Matsesta ("flame-colored river"), Kudepsta, and Khosta ("the river of boars").

=== Adlersky city district ===
Adlersky city district, with an area of 1,352 square kilometers (522 sq mi) and a population of 76,534 people as of the 2010 Census, is the southernmost district of the city, located just north of the border with Abkhazia. Until the establishment of Greater Sochi in 1961, it was administered as a separate town, which had its origin in an ancient Sadz village and a medieval Genoese trading post.

Among the natural wonders of the district is the Akhshtyr Gorge with a 160-meter-long cave that contains traces of human habitation. The upland part of the district includes a network of remote mountain villages (auls), the Estonian colony at Estosadok, and the ski resort of Krasnaya Polyana which hosted the events (Alpine and Nordic) of the 2014 Winter Olympics. Also located here is a trout fishery and a breeding nursery for great apes.

== Demographics ==
Historical population
Year	Pop.	±%
1897	1,352	—
1926	10,433	+671.7%
1939	49,813	+377.5%
1959	81,912	+64.4%
1970	224,031	+173.5%
1979	287,353	+28.3%
1989	336,514	+17.1%
2002	328,809	−2.3%
2010	343,334	+4.4%
2021	466,078	+35.8%
Source: Census data

Sochi has an ethnic Russian majority (~70%). The city is home to a sizable Armenian minority (~20%), which is especially notable in the Adlersky City District where they compose more than half of the total population. Most of Sochi's Armenian community are descendants of Hamshen Armenians from Turkey's northeastern Black Sea coast, who began arriving in the late 19th century. The rest are Armenians from Georgia (particularly from Abkhazia and Samtskhe-Javakheti) and Armenia (especially from Shirak Province due to the 1988 earthquake).

Year	Total population	Urban	Russians	Armenians	Ukrainians	Georgians
1887	98	—N/a				
1891	460	—N/a				
1897	1,352	—N/a	37.9%	6.0%	19.9%	17.1%
1904	8,163	—N/a				
1916	13,254	—N/a				
1926	13,000	—N/a				
1939	72,597	49,813				
1959	127,000	81,912				
1970	245,300	203,100				
1979	292,300	245,600				
1989	385,851	339,814				
1992	369,900	322,400	68.7%	14.2%	5.9%	1.5%
1994	378,300	—N/a				
1997	388,200	—N/a				
2002	397,103	332,778	67.5%	20.2%	3.7%	2.3%
2006	395,012	329,481				
2007	402,043	331,059				
2008	406,800	334,282				
2009	410,987	337,947				
2010	420,589	347,932	69.92%	20.09%	2.29%	2.03%
Source, unless otherwise marked:

=== Religion ===
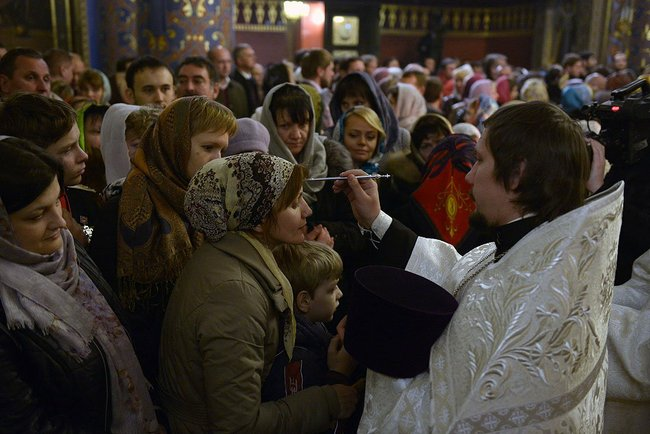
Inside the Church of the Holy Mandylion, Sochi.

The Byzantine Empire brought Christianity to the Sochi region in the Middle Ages.The region was relatively isolated before 1829. In the North, a few hundred Sunni Muslim Shapsugs, a part of the Circassian nation, lived around Tkhagapsh, near Lazarevskoye. The Circassians (also known as Adyghe) converted to Islam from Christianity in the 17th century. In the nineteenth century, Islam spread to the region.

Currently, Sochi is a large predominantly Christian city, though there are thought to be around 20,000 Muslims (5% of inhabitants) living there now (the majority are Adyghe) plus other Eastern Caucasians, Turks, Tatars, and other smaller Muslim groups.

A mosque was built in 2008 by United Arab Emirates in the central area of Bytkha, in addition to the old mosque being around 40 km (25 miles) north of the city center in the Adyghe aul of Tkhagapsh.

There are around thirty Russian Orthodox churches, the largest being St. Michael's, and two monasteries, plus two Catholic churches, one in the center of Sochi and the other in Lazarevskoye. The Armenian community gathers in about ten churches.

== Economy ==
=== Overview ===
Turnover of large and medium-sized enterprises of the city, in billion rubles.
Year	Billion rubles
2014	136
2015	150
2016	170.8
2017	191.3

Sochi is an economic centre of Krasnodar Krai and Russia. According to the economist-geographer Natalia Zubarevich, Sochi, being a "recreational capital", along with the largest industrial centers, acts as a "motor" of development that determines the prospects and directions of the country's development. The economy of Sochi is based on trade, construction, resort and tourism. Its structure for 2015: retail trade (59%), construction (15%), resorts and tourism (11%), industry (10.6%), transport (3.5%) and agriculture (0.9%). Sochi is one of the most popular tourism centres, as well as a prominent financial centre in Russia. Investments in the city's economy over the past 10 years have amounted to more than 1.1 trillion rubles. The turnover of medium and large enterprises in Sochi in 2017 amounted to more than 191.3 billion rubles. The increase in turnover in comparison with the previous year is 12%.

In 2010, Sochi headed the "Rating of Russian cities by quality of life" of the Urbanika Institute, and in 2014 and 2015 it ranked as 4th and 5th city respectively; experts noted the high rate of development of the city, large-scale investments on the eve of the 2014 Winter Olympics, favorable environmental conditions and high safety of residents. In 2012, Sochi topped the rating of "30 best cities for business" in Russia, by Forbes.

=== Tourism ===
Today, 705 classified accommodation facilities operate on its territory, including: 66 sanatoriums, 20 boarding houses and recreation centers and 618 hotels. 183 beach areas have been opened, more than 100 tourist facilities operate, about 70 excursion companies operate.

Over 5.2 million tourists visited Sochi in 2016, 5.9% more than in 2015. The average annual occupancy rate of hotels was at 77%, but varies by season. The importance of tourism for the development of Sochi is also determined by the financial revenues from the industry. According to statistics, in 2015, tourism revenues amounted to about 30 billion rubles. At the same time, throughout the country, revenues from the industry amounted to 161 billion rubles; thus, the tourist industry of the city occupies 18.6% of the total market of the country.

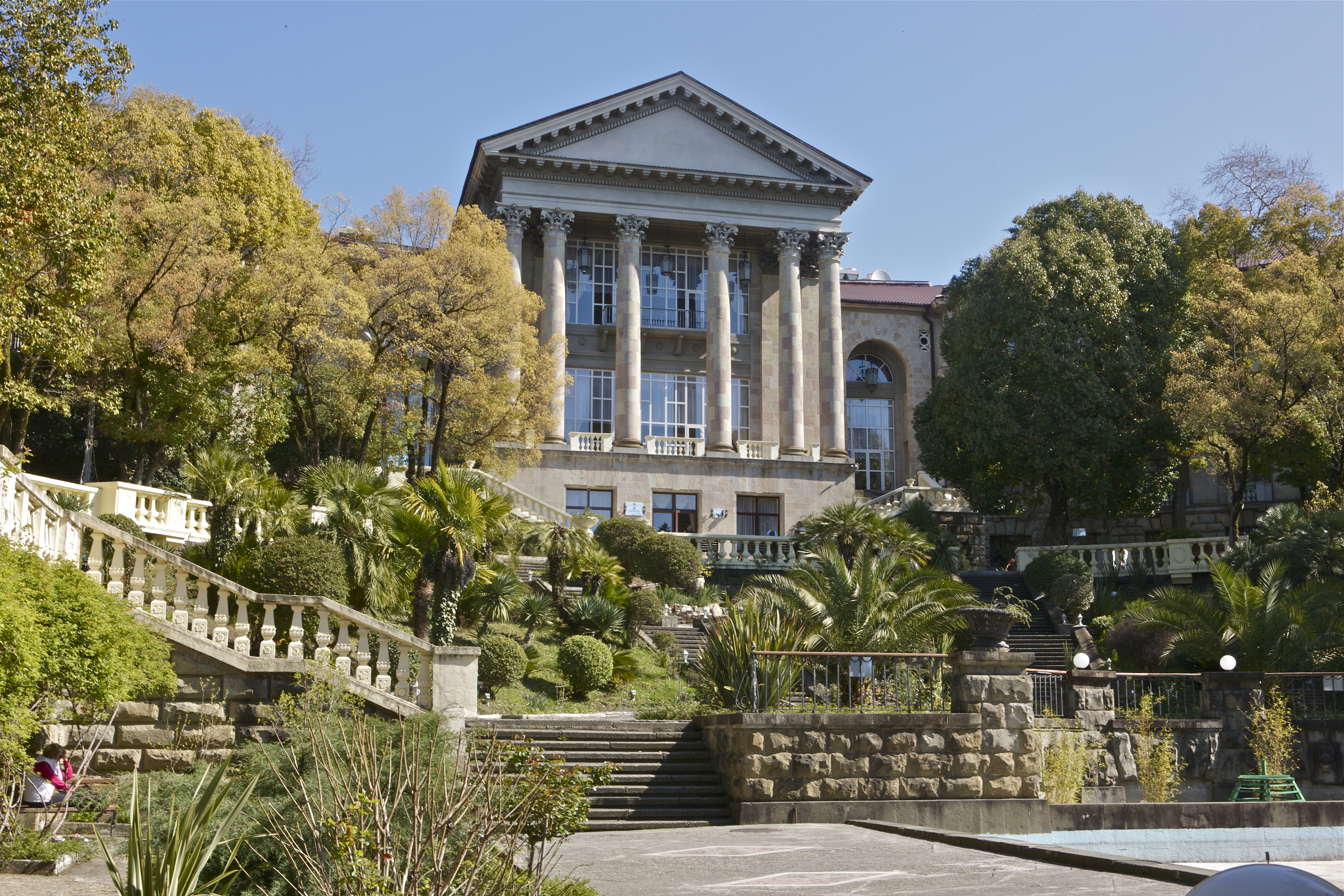
Sanatorium Metallurg

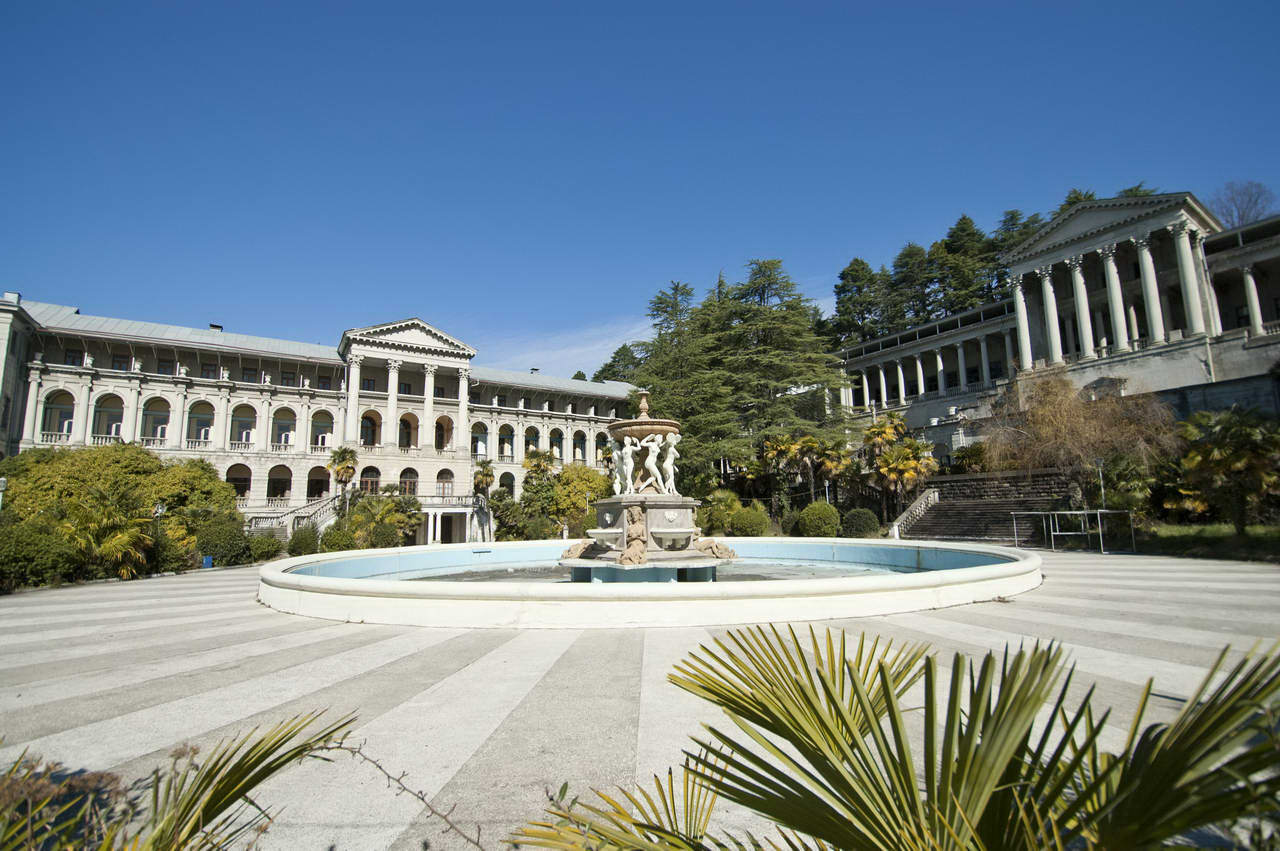
Sanatorium Ordzhonikidze

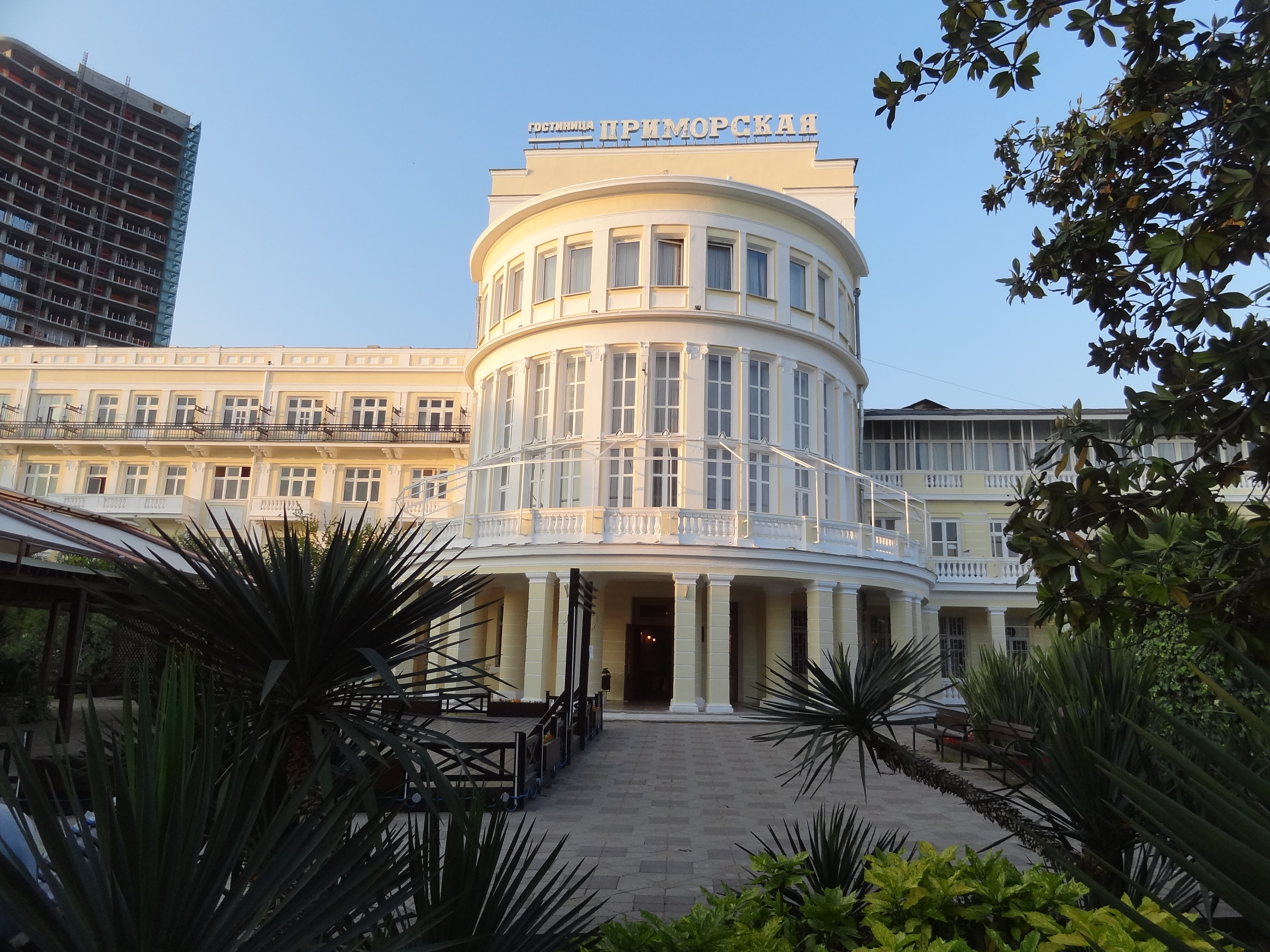
Primorskaya Hotel

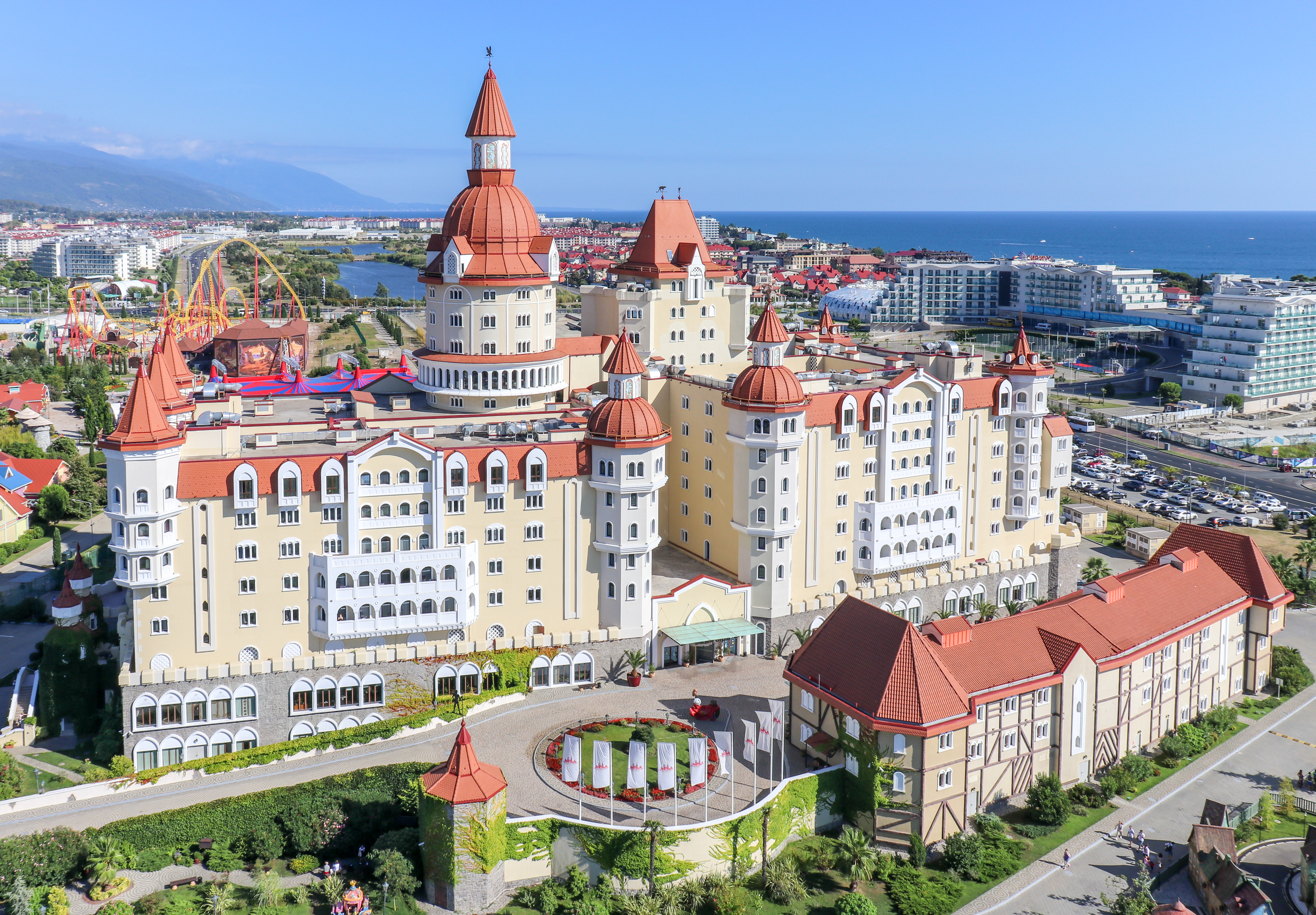
Bogatyr hotel

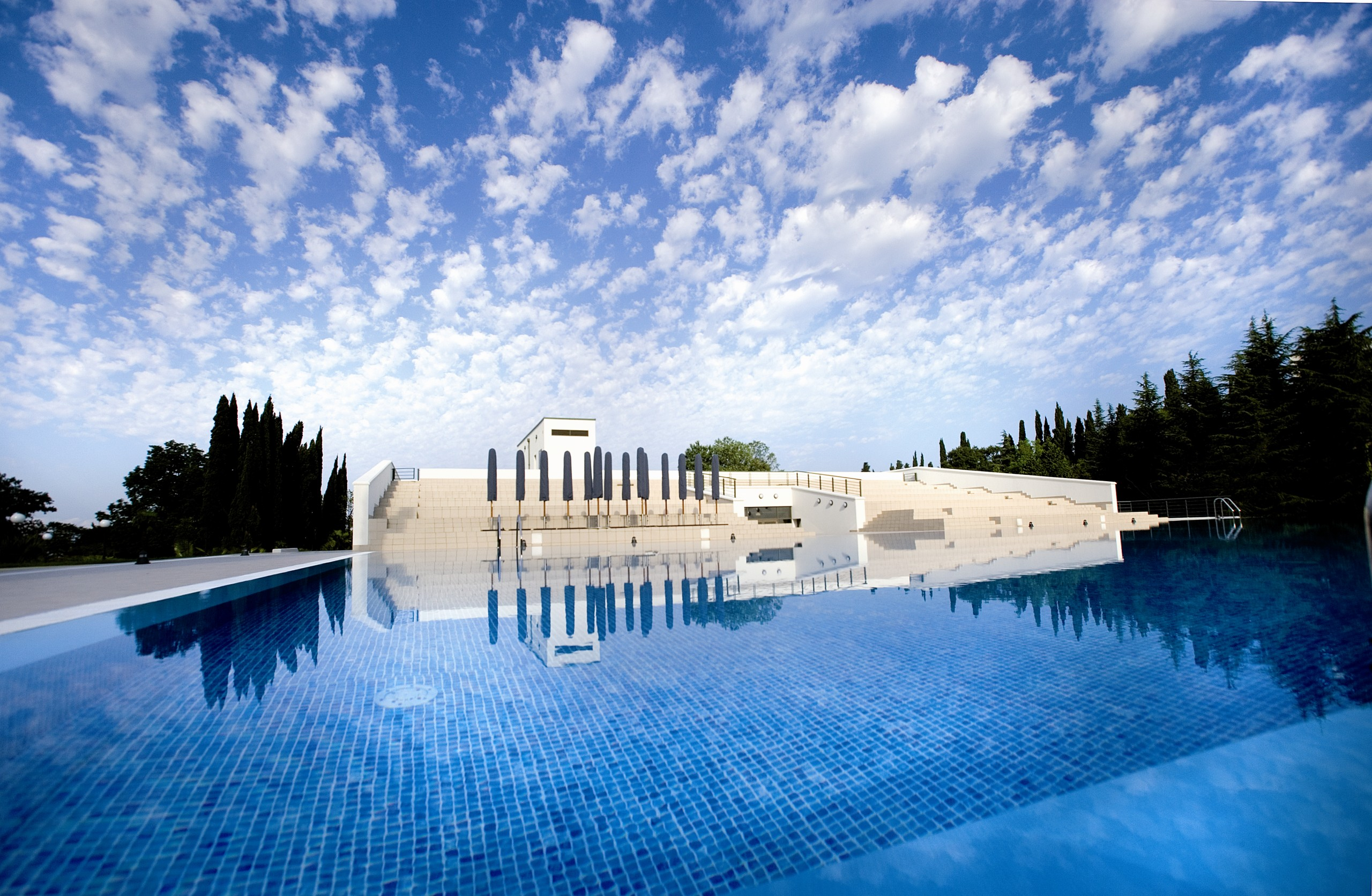
Rodina Grand Hotel pool

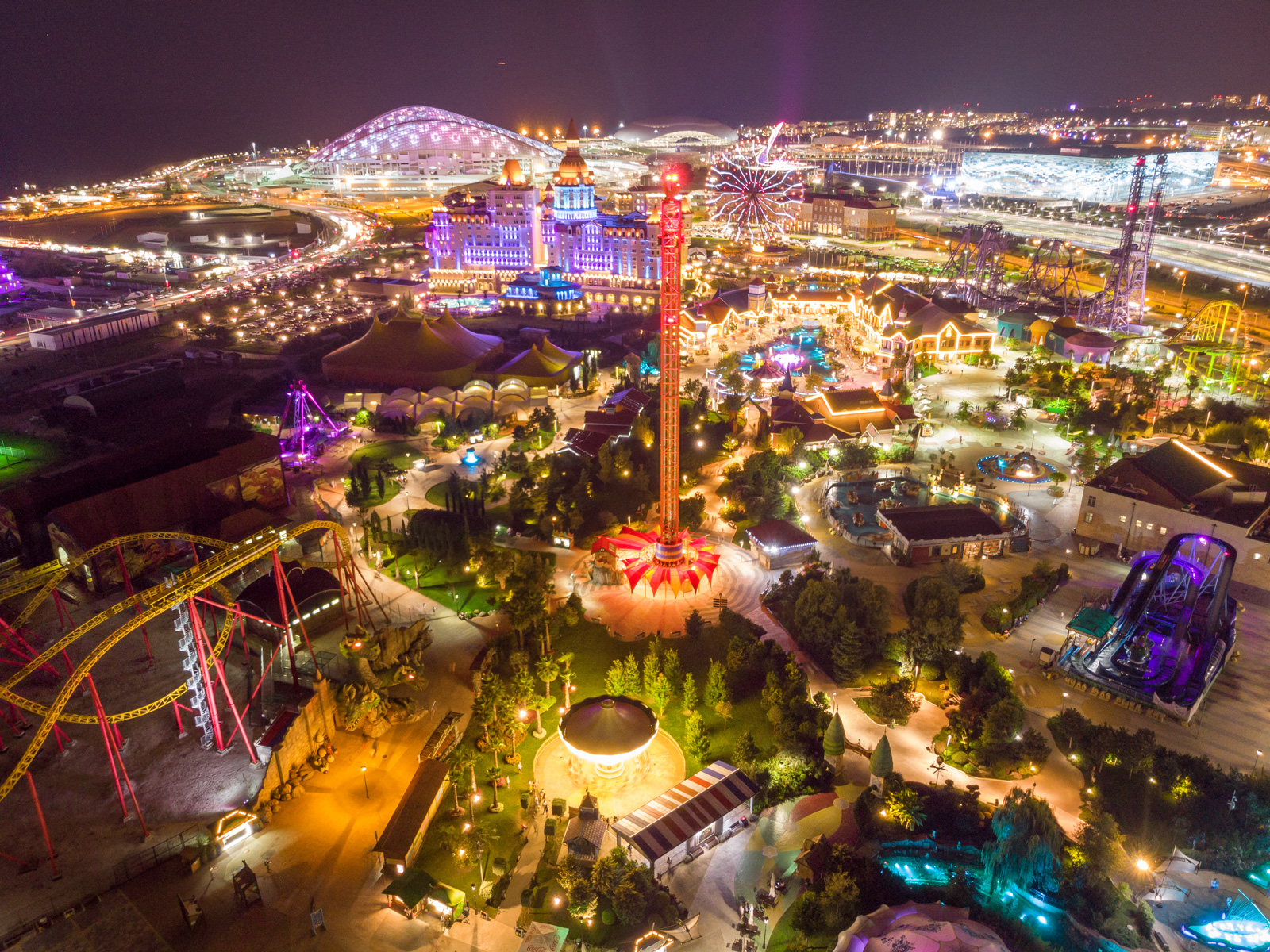
Sochipark in the evening

=== Trade, finance and services ===
The retail trade turnover for medium and large enterprises (accounting for about 30% of the total turnover) in the city in 2016 amounted to 57.2 billion rubles. On the territory of the city there are 8,769 objects of the consumer sphere, of which: 5013 are stationary retail enterprises, 1450 are catering enterprises, 335 are wholesale enterprises, and 1083 are service enterprises. In Sochi, 1807 grocery stores, 2,708 non-food stores, 294 stores of a mixed group of goods, 178 pharmacies, 16 car dealerships, 20 stores at gas stations, 945 pavilions and kiosks have been opened. The provision of the population with retail space is 1,106.7 m^{2} (11,912 sq ft) per 1000 people.

According to 2017 data, the annual trade turnover per capita in Sochi was 1.75 times higher than the average in Russia (373,527 rubles per year per person). At the same time, it exceeds the annual trade turnover per capita in all cities with a population of over one million, including Saint Petersburg and Moscow. A high trade turnover is ensured by both a large flow of tourists and a high average wage in the city. The annual retail turnover generated by permanent residents is about 96.2 billion rubles (52%). Tourists generate about 87.83 billion rubles (48%).

The turnover of public catering in the city in 2016 for medium and large enterprises amounted to 7 billion rubles (about 36% of the total turnover). 1450 public catering establishments were opened in Sochi, with a total of 90473 seats. The market of paid services to the population in 2016 amounted to 34.3 million rubles; the industry employs 3393 people, with a total of 1083 enterprises.

=== Industry and agriculture ===
The volume of goods shipped in 2016 for medium and large industrial enterprises of the city amounted to 19.4 billion rubles. The distribution of energy, gas and water accounted for 11.9 billion rubles, the largest enterprises in the industry are: Adler TPP and Sochinskaya TPP. Processing industries accounted for 3.3 billion rubles. The volume of shipment of minerals amounted to 76 million rubles, the largest enterprise in the industry is Firma Sochinerud.

In the manufacturing industry, the overwhelming share of food production enterprises, which account for 92.3% of the production volume. Large enterprises: Sochi meat-packing plant, Trout-breeding farm, Primorskaya quail farm, Sochi bakery and Lazarevsky bakery.

The volume of shipped agricultural products in 2016 amounted to 49.8 million rubles. Vegetables, citrus fruits, fruits (including heat-loving crops such as feijoa, medlar, kiwi) and flowers are cultivated by large agricultural enterprises: Verlioka, Voskhod and Pobeda. The only producer of poultry meat is the Adler Poultry Factory. Five enterprises are engaged in the cultivation and processing of tea: Dagomyschay, Solokhaul tea, Matsesta tea, Khosta tea, Shapsug tea and a number of farmers.

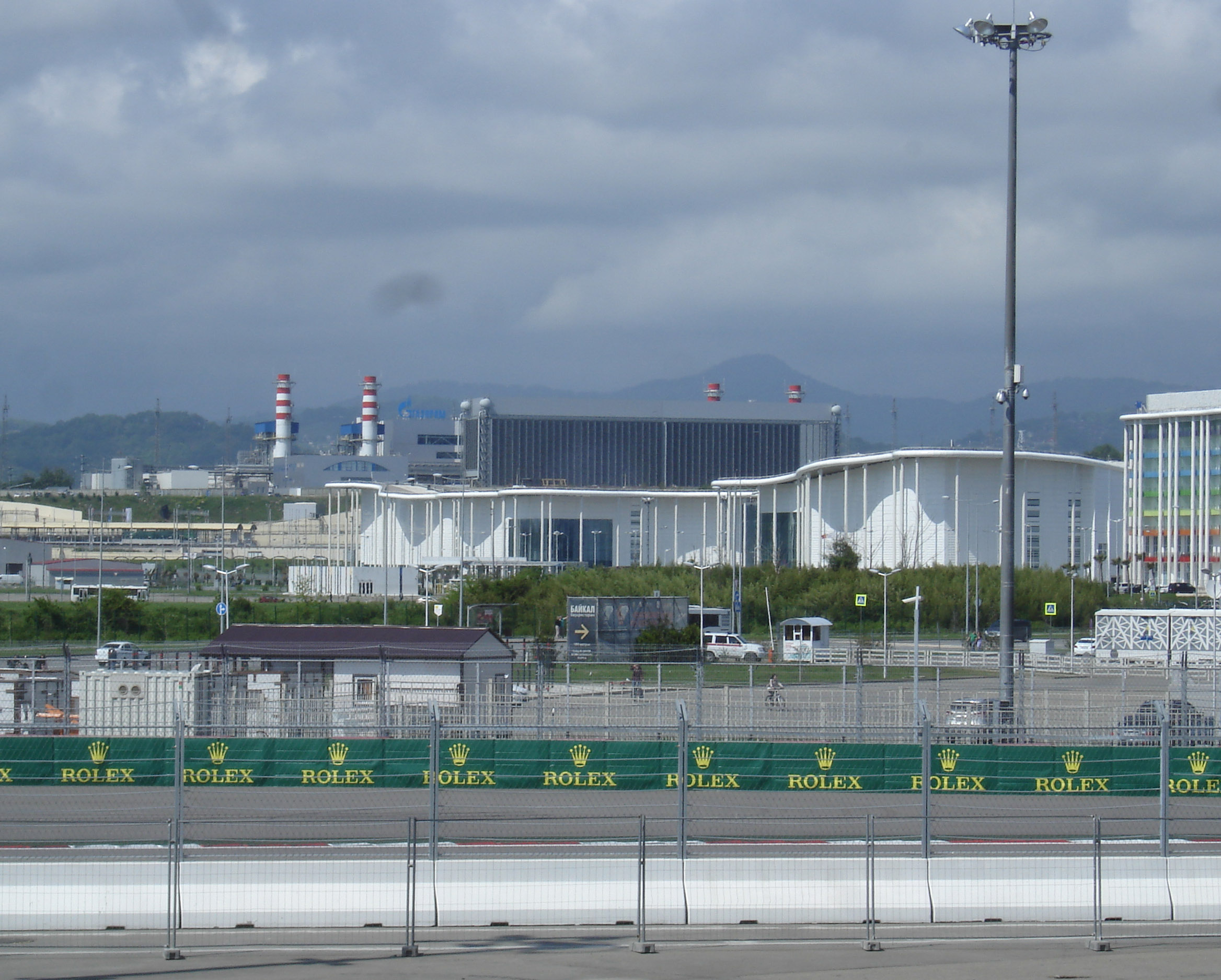
Adler TPP

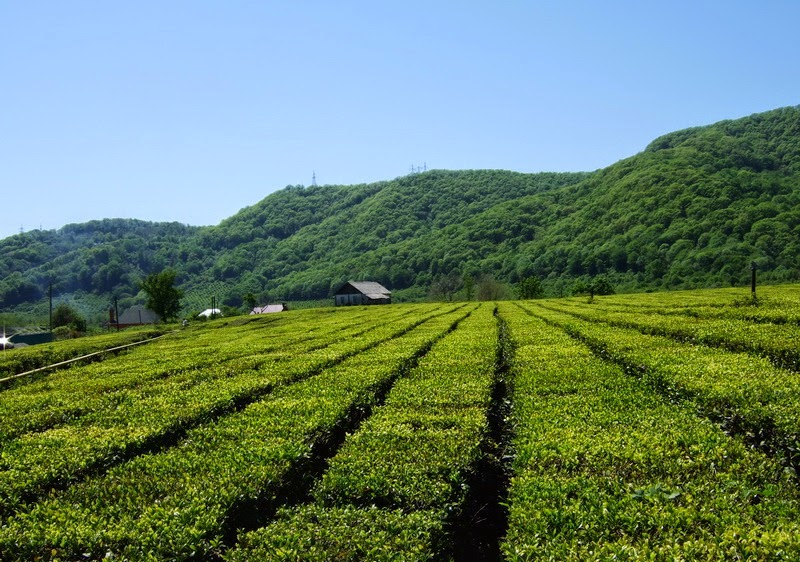
Tea plantations near Akhintam

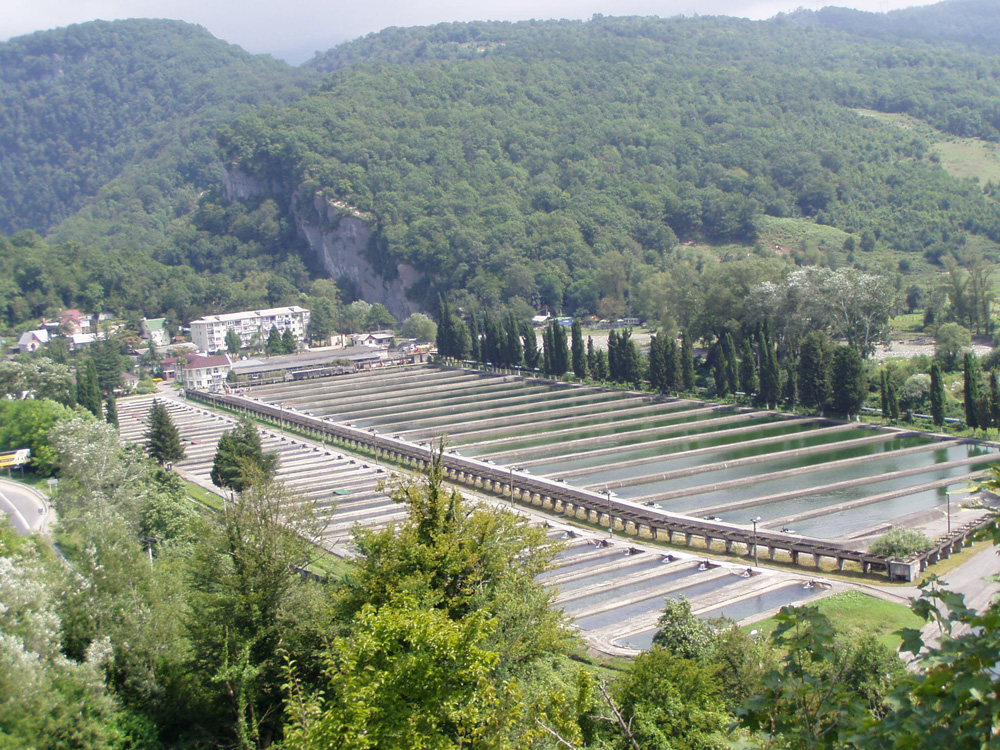
Trout farming near Adler

== Education ==
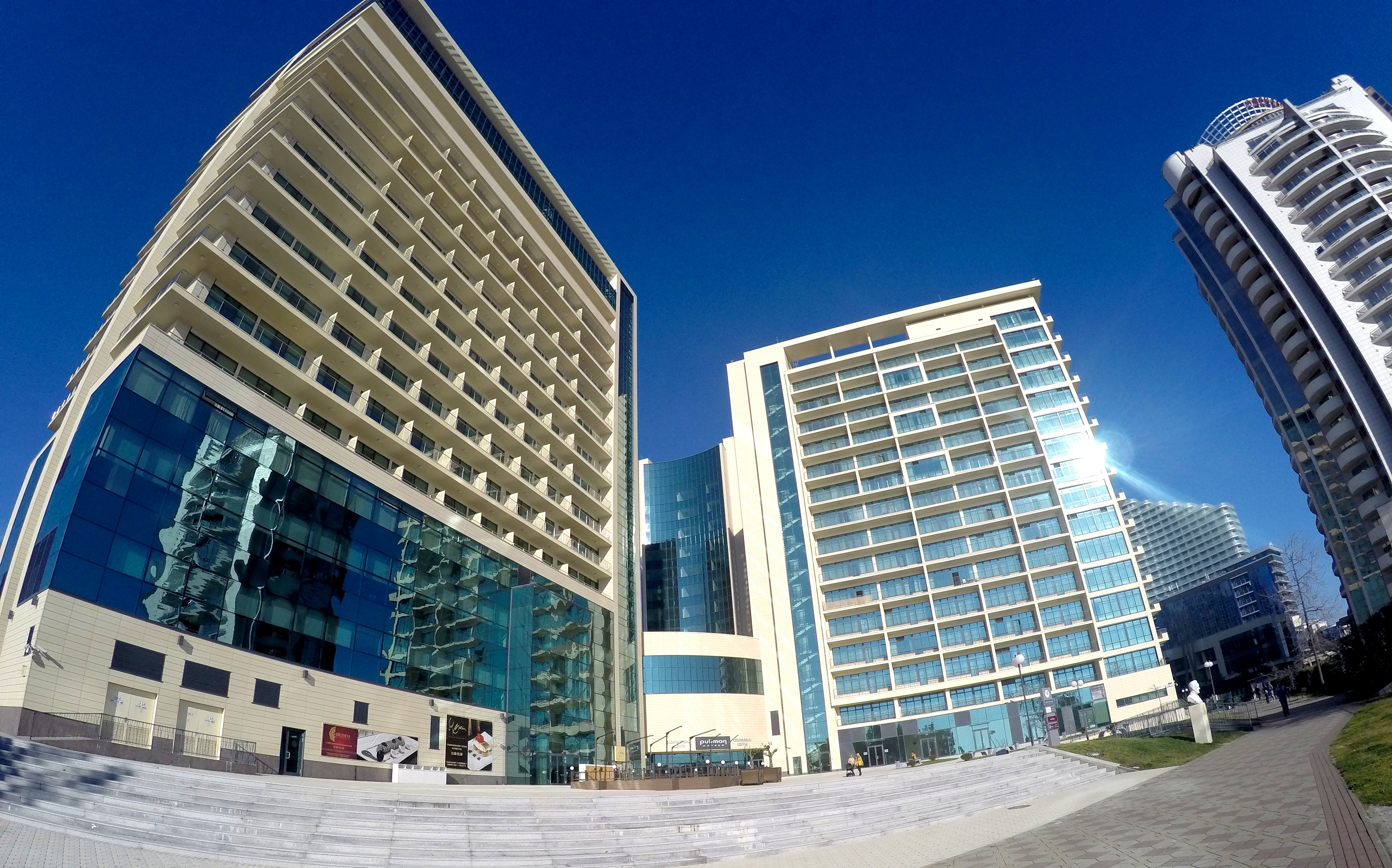
Russian International Olympic University

There are more than 70 secondary schools in Sochi.

In addition to branches of metropolitan universities, Sochi has its own higher educational institutions, which are also of federal importance:

- Sochi State University
- Russian International Olympic University
- Sochi Institute of Peoples' Friendship University of Russia
- International Innovation University
- Sochi Institute of Fashion, Business and Law
- Sochi Maritime Institute
- Sochi Branch of the Russian State Social University
- Sochi Branch of the Russian State University of Justice
- Sochi Branch of the Moscow New Law Institute
- Sochi Branch of the Moscow Automobile and Highway State Technical University
- Sochi Branch of the Adyghe State University

Secondary specialized educational institutions:

- College of Economics and Technology at Sochi State University
- College of Art
- College of Multicultural Education
- Medical College
- Professional Technical School
- Kuban College of Law
- Sochi Financial and Law College
- Sochi College of Humanities and Economics

=== Science ===
Sochi is indispensable for Russian science from a geographical and climatic point of view. The only subtropics in Russia are actively used as a base for scientific research in the field of botany, medicine and coastal construction. In addition to higher education institutions that develop science, Sochi has a number of research institutions of all-Russian importance:

- Sochi Research Center of the Russian Academy of Sciences
- Research Institute of Medical Primatology, Russian Academy of Medical Sciences
- Research Institute of Mountain Forestry and Forest Ecology of the Ministry of Natural Resources of the Russian Federation
- All-Russian Scientific Research Institute of Floriculture and Subtropical Crops of the Russian Academy of Agricultural Sciences
- Sochi Branch of the Russian Geographical Society

== Sports ==
=== Sports facilities ===
A local tennis school spawned the careers of such players as Grand Slam champions Maria Sharapova and Yevgeny Kafelnikov (Kafelnikov spent much of his childhood here, while Sharapova relocated to Florida at the age of seven). In late 2005, the Russian Football Union announced that it was planning to establish a year-round training center for the country's national teams in Sochi. The city's warm climate was cited as one of the main incentives. Sochi is also the home for the football team PFC Sochi which plays in the Russian Premier League and for the ice hockey team HC Sochi which plays in the Kontinental Hockey League.

=== 2014 Winter Olympics and Paralympics ===
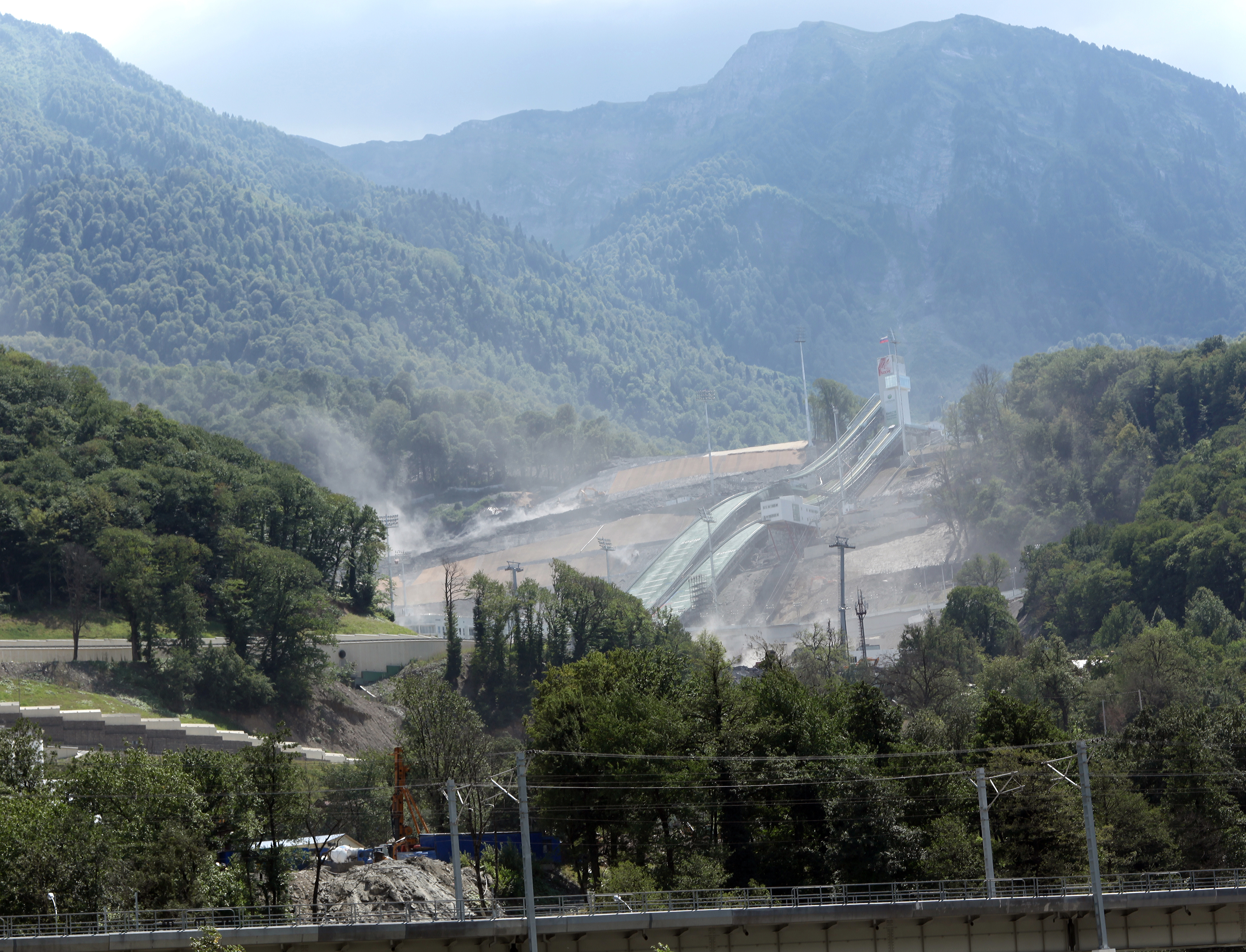
Russki Gorki ski jump arena

The nearby ski resort of Roza Khutor at Krasnaya Polyana was the location of the alpine and Nordic events for the 2014 Winter Olympics.

In June 2006, the International Olympic Committee announced that Sochi had been selected as a finalist city to host the 2014 Winter Olympics and the 2014 Winter Paralympics. On July 4, 2007, Sochi was announced as the host city of the 2014 Winter Games, edging out Pyeongchang, South Korea and Salzburg, Austria.

This was Russia's first time hosting the Winter Olympic Games, and its first time hosting the Paralympic Games. The site of a training centre for aspiring Olympic athletes, in 2008, the city had no world-class level athletic facilities fit for international competition. Severe cost overruns made the 2014 Winter Olympics the most expensive Olympics in history; with Russian politician Boris Nemtsov citing allegations of corruption among government officials, and Allison Stewart of the Saïd Business School at Oxford citing tight relationships between the government and construction firms. While originally budgeted at US$12 billion, various factors caused the budget to expand to US$51 billion, surpassing the estimated $44 billion cost of the 2008 Summer Olympics in Beijing. According to a report by the European Bank for Reconstruction and Development, this cost will not boost Russia's national economy, but may attract business to Sochi and the southern Krasnodar region of Russia in the future as a result of improved services.

The 2014 Winter Olympics in Sochi saw concern and controversy following a new federal law approved in Russia in June 2013 that bans "homosexual propaganda to minors". There were also concerns over Islamist militants.

==== Construction work ====
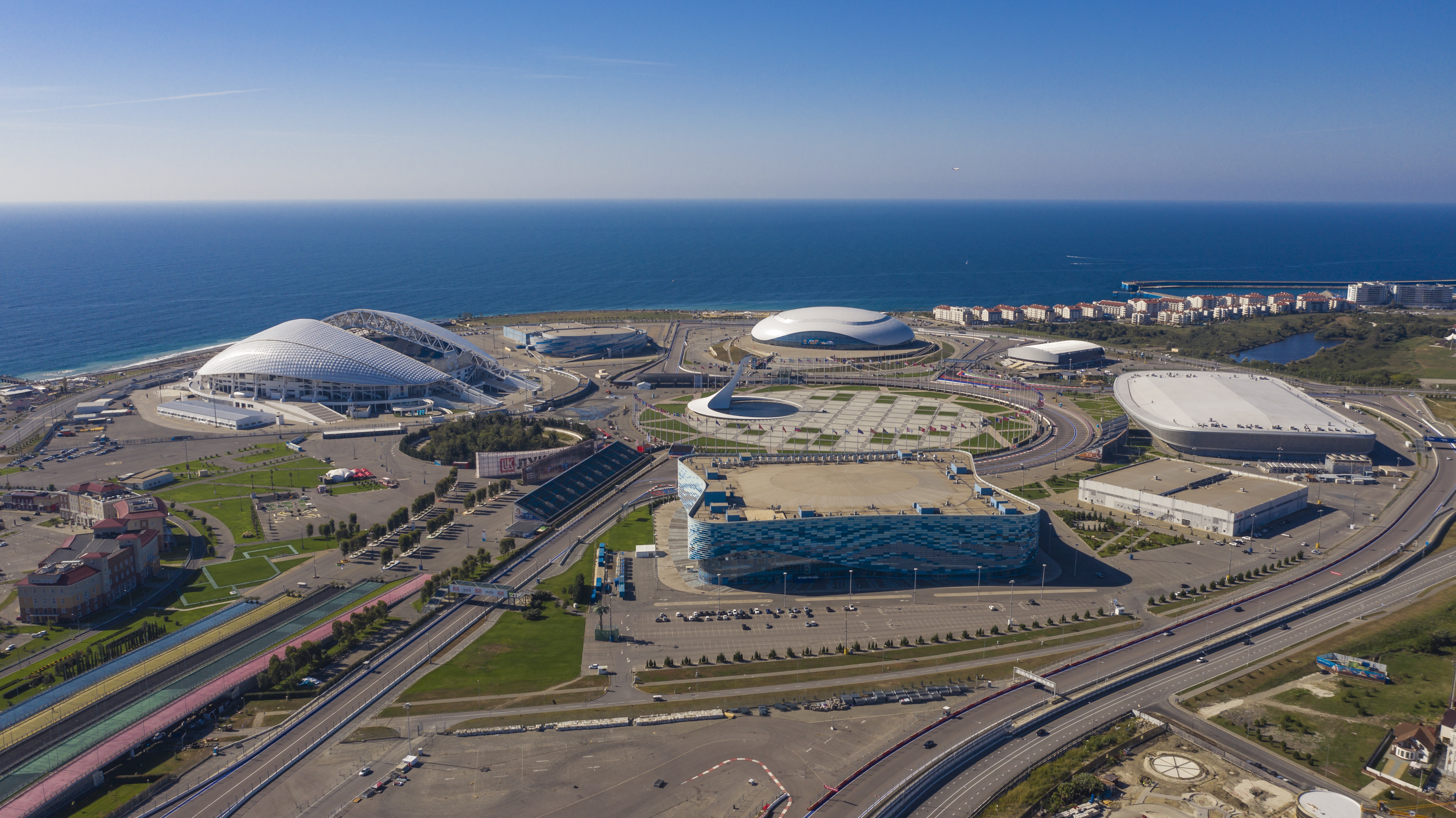
Olympic Park

The state-controlled RAO UES announced in July 2007 that it might spend 30 billion roubles (about US$1.2 billion) on upgrading the electrical power system in the Sochi area by 2014. The power generating companies Inter RAO UES and RusHydro would have to build or modernize four thermal power plants and four hydroelectric plants—and the federal grid company FGC UES has to replace the Central-Shepsi electricity transmission line, which reportedly often fails in bad weather. The new power line would run partly on power towers and partly across the bottom of the Black Sea. By 2011, the power supply of the resort area would increase by 1129 MW—of which 300 MW would be used for Olympic sports facilities. "The cost of the work is estimated at 83.6 billion rubles (about US $3.26 billion), of which 50 billion rubles (about US$2 billion) will go to investments in the electricity grid," the power companies announced. They did not say how much of the bill the state would foot. In February 2007, when UES had planned to spend 48.8 billion rubles (about US$1.9 billion) on the Sochi area, the share the state had been ready to pay 38 billion roubles (about US$1.48 billion) of that.

=== Other sports events ===
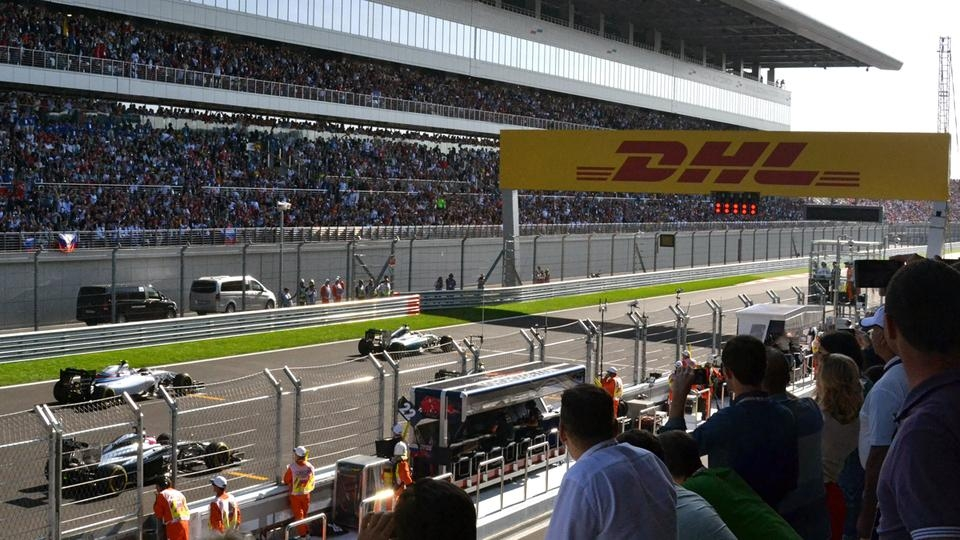
F1 Russian Grand Prix 2014

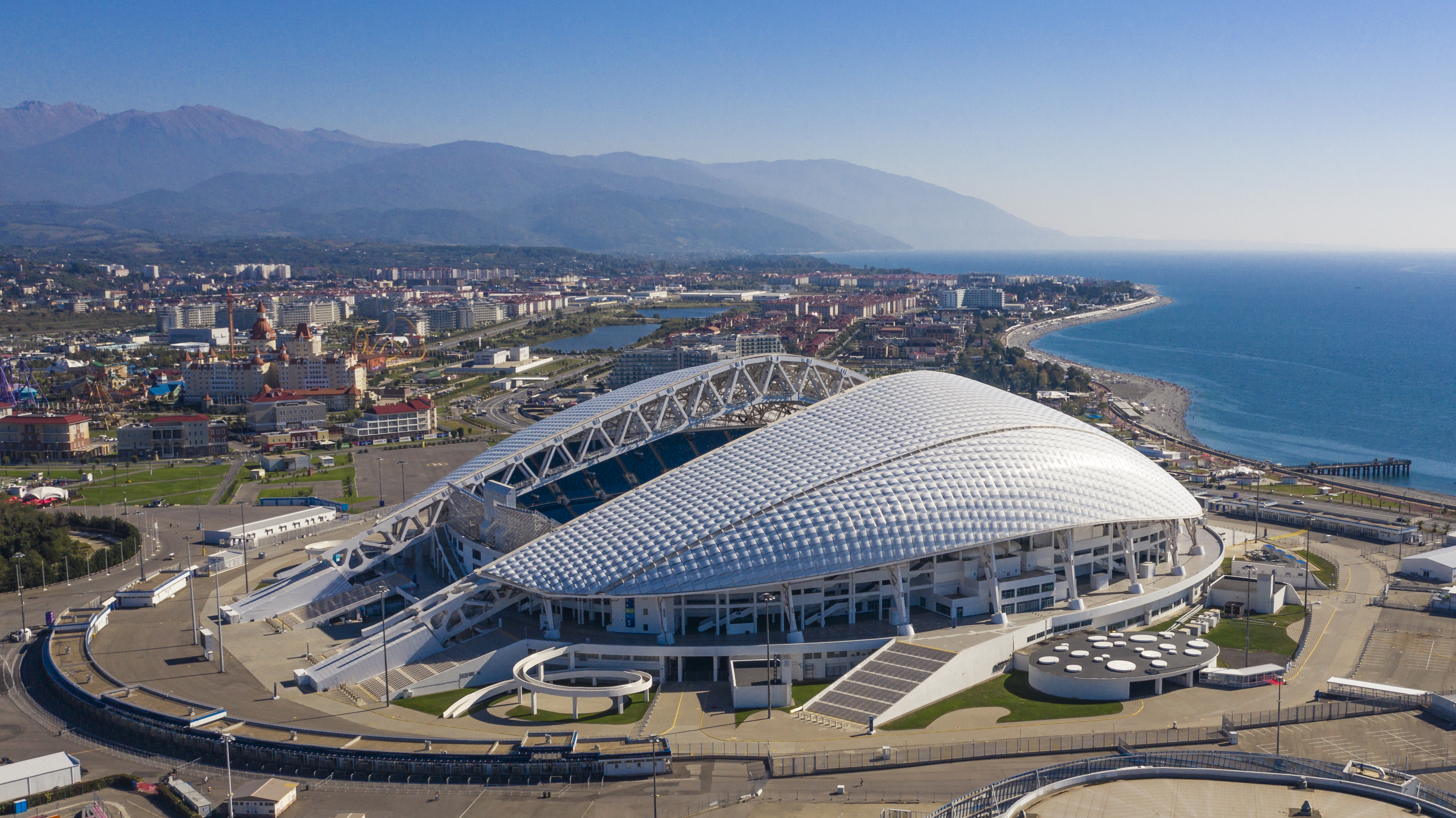
The Fisht Olympic Stadium hosted the 2018 FIFA World Cup games

The Silk Way Rally which is part of Dakar series took place in Sochi in 2010 for the last stage between the capital of the Republic of Adygea Maykop to the city of Sochi through Pseshwap.

President Vladimir Putin had reached a deal with Bernie Ecclestone for the city to host the Formula One Russian Grand Prix from 2014. However, because of the 2022 Russian invasion of Ukraine, Sochi is not allowed to host future races.

The World Robot Olympiad took place in the Adler Arena Skating Center on November 21–23, 2014.

The 2014 World Chess Championship between Viswanathan Anand and Magnus Carlsen was played in Sochi in November 2014, with Carlsen emerging as the winner.

The Fisht Olympic Stadium was also used to host 2018 FIFA World Cup football matches.

Since 2014, the city has hosted HC Sochi, who play at the Bolshoy Ice Dome in the Kontinental Hockey League.

== Transportation ==
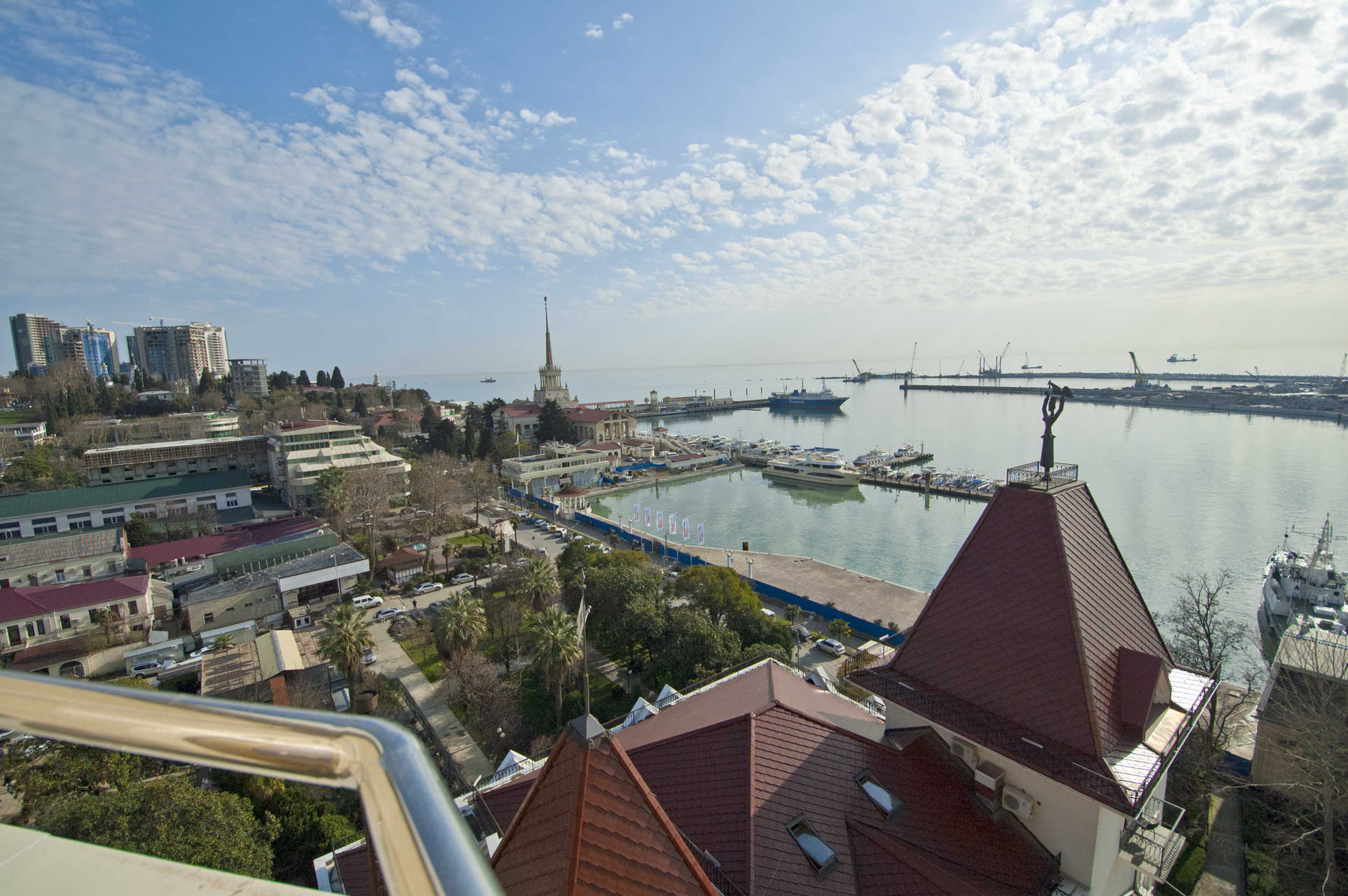
Port of Sochi

Public transport is represented mainly by bus and taxi. Sochi is served by the Adler-Sochi International Airport. Types of non-mass public transport include two funiculars (at the Central military sanatorium and Ordzhonikidze resort) and three cable cars (at arboretum sanatorium "Dawn" and pension "Neva") also has several cableways in Krasnaya Polyana.

The Sochi Port terminal building was built in 1955 by Karo Alabyan and Leonid Karlik in Stalinist architecture. It is topped with a 71-meter steepled tower. Sculptures embodying seasons and cardinal points are set above the tower's three tiers.

Five of the railway stations of Sochi were renovated for the 2014 Winter Olympics. These are Dagomys, Sochi, Matsesta and Khosta railway stations. In Adler city district of Sochi, the original railway station was preserved and new railway station was built near it. Another new railway station was built in Estosadok, close to Krasnaya Polyana.

At some point, plans to construct the light metro network to serve the Olympics were considered; however, the Sochi Light Metro plan was abandoned in favor of the reconstruction of the railway.

== Notable people ==
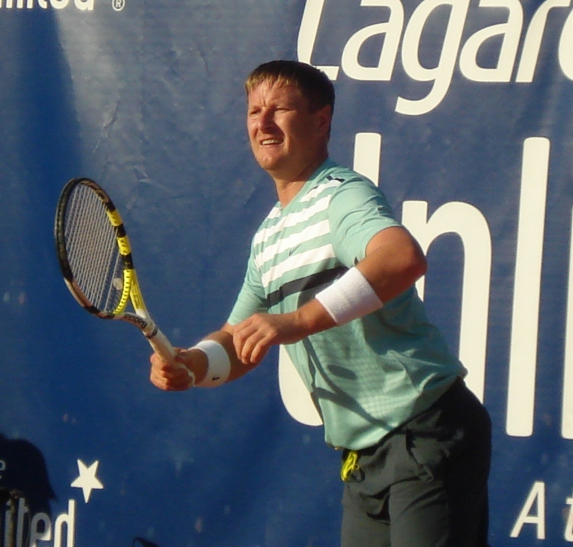
Yevgeny Kafelnikov was born and raised in Sochi

- Yuri Nikolaevich Denisyuk (1927–2006), physicist
- Mikhail Galustyan (born 1979), comedian
- Andre Geim (born 1958), physicist, graphene researcher and 2010 Nobel Prize winner
- Yevgeny Kafelnikov (born 1974), tennis player, former World No. 1 tennis player
- Daria Kondakova (born 1991), rhythmic gymnast
- Grigory Leps (born 1962), singer, songwriter, musician of Georgian origin
- Slava Metreveli (1936–1998), Georgian/Soviet association football player
- Vladimir Nemshilov (born 1948), Olympic swimmer
- Boris Nemtsov (1959–2015), politician
- Mordechai Spiegler (born 1944), Russian-Israeli association football player and manager
- Vladimir Tkachenko (born 1957), basketball player
- Elena Vesnina (born 1986), tennis player
- Kharis Yunichev (1959–2015), the first Soviet male swimmer to win an Olympic medal
- Anna Zak (born 2001), Israeli celebrity

== Twin towns – sister cities ==
Sochi is twinned with:

- Long Beach, United States (1990)
- Menton, France (1966)
- Nagato, Japan (2018)
- Rimini, Italy (1977)
- Trabzon, Turkey (1991)
- Weihai, China (1996)
- Minsk, Belarus (2023)

=== Former twin towns ===
- Cheltenham, United Kingdom (1959) – Suspended due to the ongoing Russian invasion of Ukraine.
- Baden-Baden, Germany (2011) – Suspended due to the ongoing Russian invasion of Ukraine.
- Espoo, Finland (1989–2022)
- Pärnu, Estonia (1994–2022)

== See also ==
- Federation Island
- Sochi Police
