= Tyumen railway station =

Railway station in Tyumen, Russia

Tyumen Тюмень
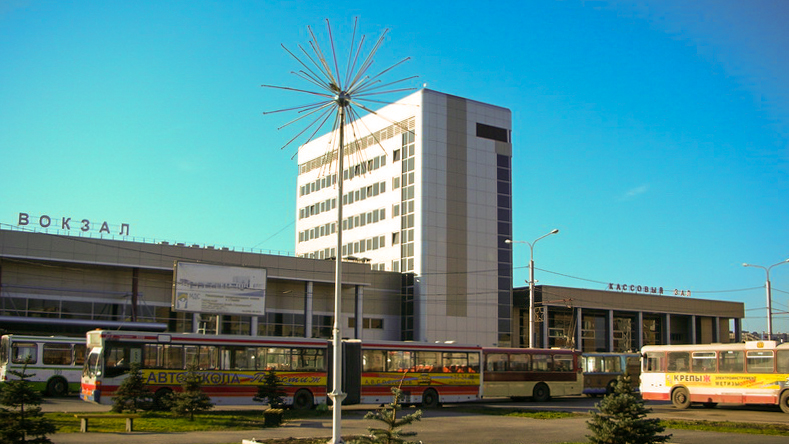
- Tyumen railway station

General information
- Location: Tyumen, Russia
- Coordinates: 57°08′42″N 65°31′21″E
- Owner: Russian Railways
- Platforms: 3
- Tracks: 15

Construction
- Parking: yes

Other information
- Station code: 790003
- Fare zone: 0

History
- Opened: 1885

Services
Preceding station	Sverdlovsk Railway	Following station
Location

Tyumen Railway Station is the primary passenger railway station for the city of Tyumen in Russia, and an important stop along the Trans-Siberian Railway.

== Destinations ==
=== Major Domestic Routes ===
- Moscow — Vladivostok
- Moscow — Tomsk
- Moscow — Barnaul
- Moscow — Khabarovsk
- Saint Petersburg — Tyumen
- Moscow — Ulan Ude
- Adler — Irkutsk
- Adler — Chita

=== International ===
Train number	Train name	Destination	Operated by
001М/002Щ	Rossiya; Россия	(Russia) Moscow (Yaroslavsky) (Russia) Vladivostok (cars: (North Korea) Pyongyang, (North Korea) Tumangang)	(Russia) Russian Railways
003З/004З		(Russia) Moscow (Yaroslavsky) (China) Beijing (Main); Runs through Mongolia	China Railway
005Щ/006Щ		(Russia) Moscow (Yaroslavsky) (Mongolia) Ulaanbaatar (cars: (Mongolia) Erdenet)	(Russia) Russian Railways (Mongolia) Ulaanbataar Railway
019Ч/020Щ	Vostok; Восток	(Russia) Moscow (Yaroslavsky) (China) Beijing (Main)	(Russia) Russian Railways
063Б/064Б		(Belarus) Minsk (cars: (Belarus) Brest) (Russia) Novosibirsk	(Belarus) Belarusian Railways
