= Nikolai Chukmaldin =

Nikolai Martemjanovich Chukmaldin
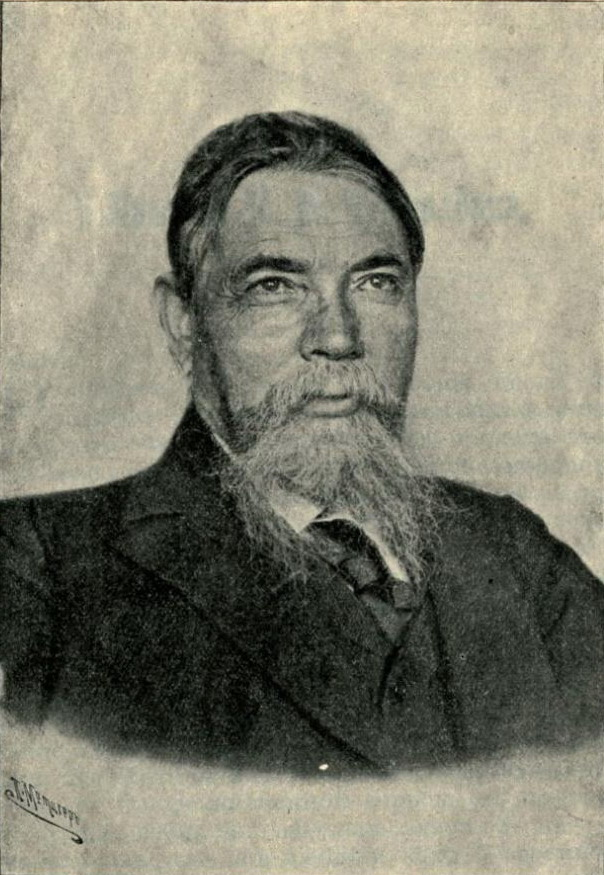
- The last photo of Chukmaldin taken by his daughter Nadezhda
- Born: 1836; Kulakovo, Tyumensky Uyezd, Tobolsk Governorate
- Died: 1901 (aged 64–65); Berlin, Germany
- Occupations: merchant, author, and philanthropist

Nikolai Martemjanovich Chukmaldin (Russian: Никола́й Мартемья́нович Чукма́лдин; 1836–1901) was a Russian merchant, author, enlightener and philanthropist.

== Biography ==
Nikolai Chukmaldin was born in the Kulakovo village near Tyumen (Tobolsk Governorate, now Tyumen Region). He was a son of the Russian Old Believer farmers Martemjan Potapovich and Melanja Egorovna.

Chukmaldin started his career as a counterman for merchants Reshetnikovs. Then he established his own business, he traded wool, tea, leather, grain. Chukmaldin tried unsuccessfully to build a weaving mill in Kulakovo and a match factory in Tyumen. In the early 1860s, he was part of a circle under the leadership of Konstantin Vysotsky (ru).

In the 1870s, Chukmaldin moved to Moscow, where he continued to engage in trade, but remembered Tyumen.

He built a school, a stone church, a bank, a carpet factory, a baker's shop in Kulakovo. Chukmaldin helped to Tyumen cultural institutions, included the Alexander Real School and Aid Society for Students. He supported the artist Ivan Kalganov. He established a museum at the Real School by selling an Ivan Slovtsov's collection.

Chukmaldin wrote many articles for Tyumen, Tobolsk, Yekaterinburg, Saint Petersburg, Moscow printings. He travelled through Russian Empire (Crimea, North Caucasus, Transcaucasia, Grand Duchy of Finland), Germany, Austria, Switzerland, Norway, Palestine, Egypt and wrote books about his travels.

Nikolai Chukmaldin died in Berlin. He was buried in Kulakovo.

== Legacy ==
Tyumen local historians consider Chukmaldin as an "outstanding Siberian enlightener" (выдающийся сибирский просветитель) and an "outstanding representative of the Tyumen intelligentsia" (выдающийся представитель тюмен[ской] интеллигенции).

Since 2010, the Tyumen State University conducts the Chukmaldin's Readings (Чукмалдинские чтения), an academic conference on history and philology. In the same year an unnamed park in Tyumen was named in honor of Chukmaldin. In 2014, a monument to Chukmaldin was erected in the park.

== Bibliography ==
- Bespalova L. G., Bespalova Y. M. Chukmaldin Nikolai Martemjanovich // Bolshaya Tyumenskaya Entsiklopediya. Tyumen, 2004. Vol. 3, p. 401–402. (In Russian)
- Zhirov A. A. Chukmaldin Nikolai Martemjanovich // Kratkaya Entsiklopediya po Istorii Kupechestva i Kommertsii Sibiri. Novosibirsk, 1998. Vol. 4, part 2, p. 123–125. (In Russian)
