= Lovers' Bridge =

Lovers' Bridge Мост Влюблённых
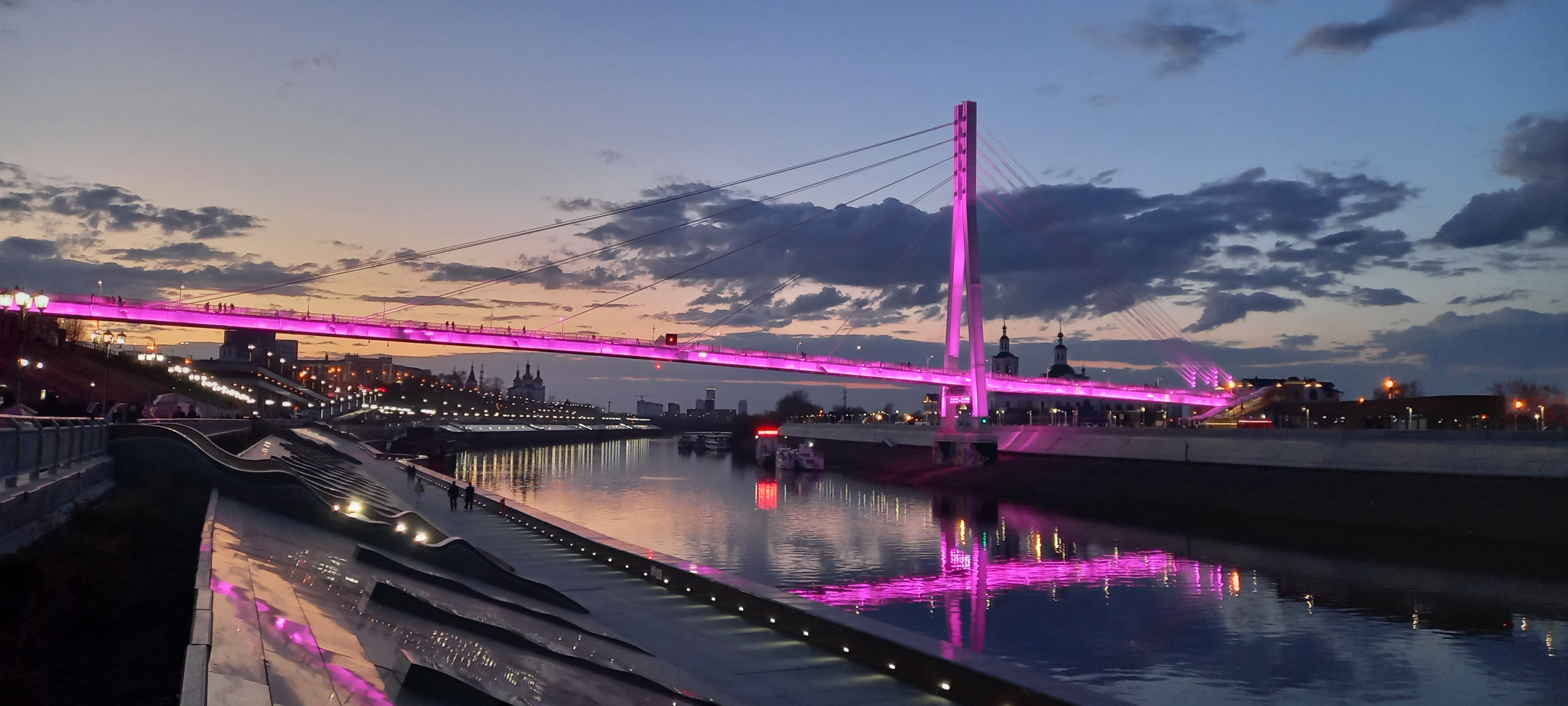
- Coordinates: 57°09′52″N 65°31′20″E
- Carries: Pedestrians
- Locale: Tyumen, Russia
- Official name: Lovers' Bridge (Most Vlyublyonnykh)

Characteristics
- Design: Cable-stayed bridge
- Material: Steel and concrete
- Total length: 247.6 metres (812 ft)
- Width: 6 metres (20 ft)
- No. of spans: 3
- Load limit: 20 tons

History
- Construction start: June 1985
- Construction end: July 1987
- Opened: July 26, 1987

Location
- Interactive map of Lovers' Bridge

Lovers' Bridge (Russian: Мост Влюблённых) is a cable-stayed pedestrian bridge over the Tura River in the Central District of Tyumen, Russia.

== Design and construction ==
The bridge is a three-span cable-stayed bridge with a total length of 247.6 metres (812 ft) and a width of 6 metres (20 ft). The structural scheme consists of spans measuring 36.0, 104.5, and 36.0 meters. The project was developed by the Tyumengiprotruboprovod institute, with R. N. Kudryavtseva serving as the chief project engineer.

The bridge was designed to withstand a static load of up to 20 tons. During the final construction phase in 1987, the structure underwent load testing using 18 KamAZ trucks parked simultaneously on the span. Originally, the design included benches for pedestrians, but they were later removed to reduce the constant static load on the cables.

== History ==
The construction of the bridge began in June 1985, and it was officially opened on July 26, 1987, five years after the collapse of the old wooden bridge. Contrary to popular belief, the new bridge was not built on the site of the former wooden structure. The original wooden bridge was located at Shcherbakova Street, whereas the current pedestrian bridge was constructed at Krasnoarmeyskaya Street. This distinction is evident in historical photographs. The embankment used for the ramp to the wooden bridge and the distinctive road loop on Beregovaya Street remained visible on Yandex Panoramas until 2020.

In 1988, a similar bridge collapsed in Voskresensk, Moscow Oblast. As a precaution, in 1989, engineers inspected the Tyumen bridge and further reinforced the shore support. Originally, the bridge featured benches, but they were later removed as the structure was not designed for such a significant static load.

During the load-testing phase, as many as 18 KamAZ trucks were parked on the bridge simultaneously.

In the late 1990s, an unofficial bungee jumping club operated on the bridge. However, following a fatal accident in September 1999 involving a 16-year-old boy due to faulty equipment, such jumps were strictly prohibited.

In 2003, local DJs Maria Kondratovich and Timur Shkval organized a "Longest Kiss" competition on the bridge. Subsequently, the Mayor of Tyumen, Stepan Kirichuk, was proposed to rename the bridge from "Pedestrian" (Peshekhodny) to "Lovers' Bridge". On July 26, newlyweds and local officials officially inaugurated the new name. Between 2016 and 2017, the bridge underwent a major renovation, including the installation of a modern dynamic lighting system. In May 2017, the bridge underwent a major image change, a process captured in detail by Tyumen photographer Sergey Elesin, highlighting the transition to a more modern architectural look.

== Current status ==
Currently, the bridge serves as a popular meeting spot for couples and is considered a primary landmark of Tyumen. Since 2005, a tradition of hanging love locks on the bridge's railings has emerged. Within just a few years, over a thousand locks were attached, reaching a total weight of 4.5 tons. To prevent excessive structural load, the locks are removed approximately once every two years.

It is a local custom for newlyweds to visit the bridge for wedding photoshoots. A clock is installed at the bridge's entrance to assist couples meeting for dates. The bridge also serves a functional purpose for residents of the Starye Zareki district, providing pedestrian access to the left bank of the river.

The structure features architectural night lighting, and the Russian national flag is displayed on one of its supports. Free Wi-Fi is available on the bridge. Future development plans have included repainting the bridge in bright colors and potentially installing a fountain. On Valentine's Day, residents often create a large heart made of rose petals and photographs on the frozen surface of the Tura River beneath the bridge.

== Suicides ==
Despite its romantic reputation, the bridge is also a frequent site for suicide attempts, ranking first in Tyumen for such incidents. On average, two fatal jumps occur each year. During the navigation season, the river's current often carries bodies far from the site, complicating recovery efforts.

Local emergency services and passersby frequently intervene to prevent individuals from jumping. Evgeny Rodyashin, the chief psychiatrist of the Tyumen region, suggested that the 2017 renovation and the introduction of brighter colors might help reduce the frequency of suicide attempts at the location.
