= Tyumen =

City in Tyumen Oblast, Russia

Tyumen Тюмень
- City
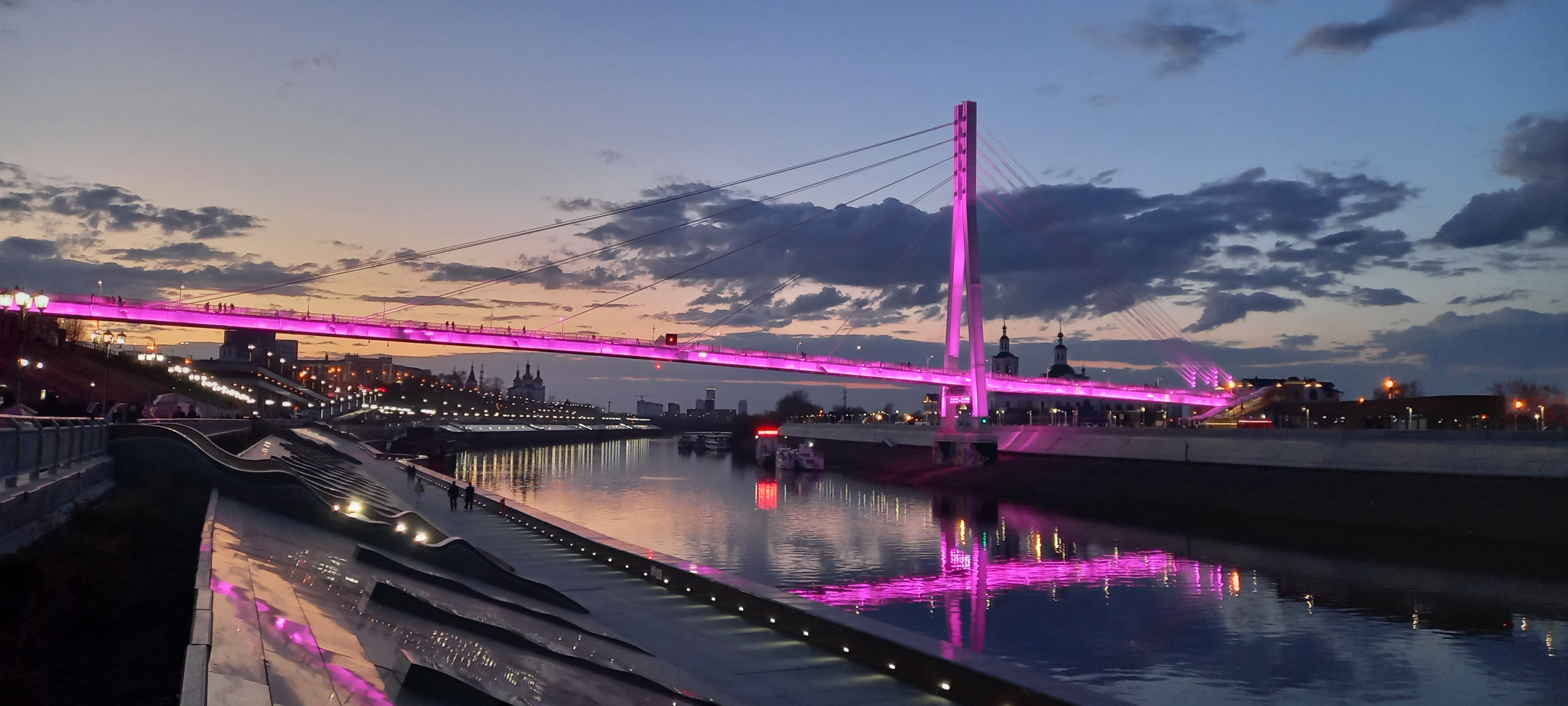
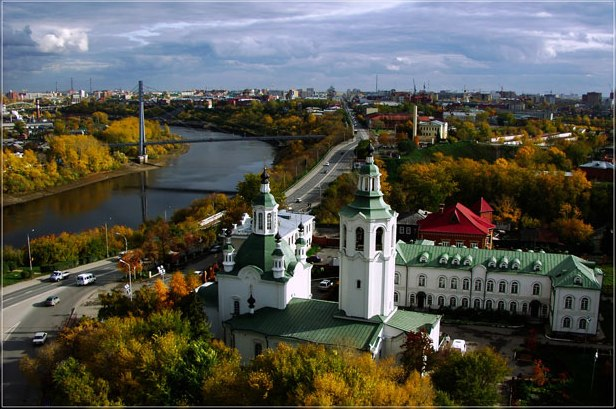
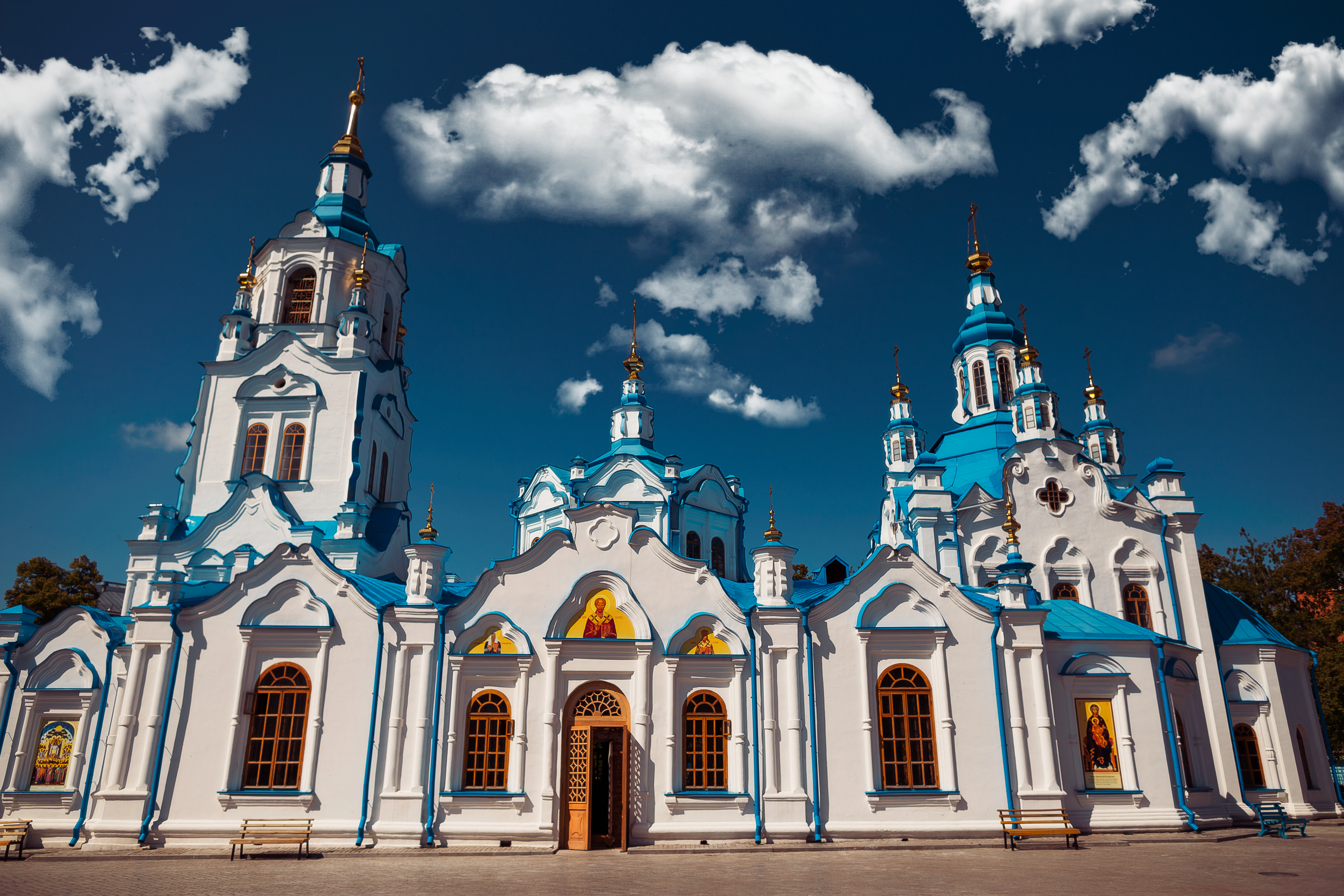
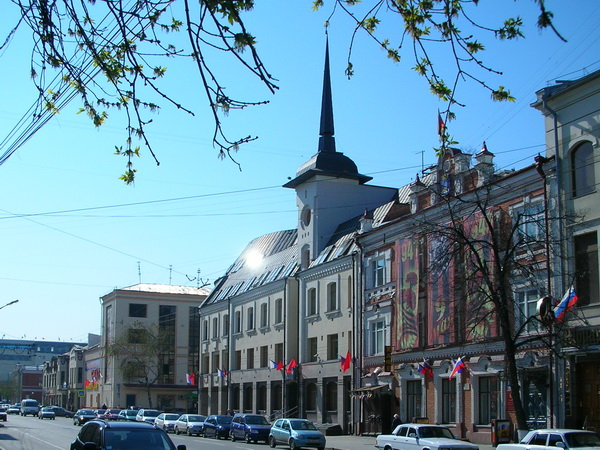
- Tyumen Lovers' Bridge Exaltation of the Holy Cross Church Znamensky Cathedral Noble Assembly House Respubliki Street

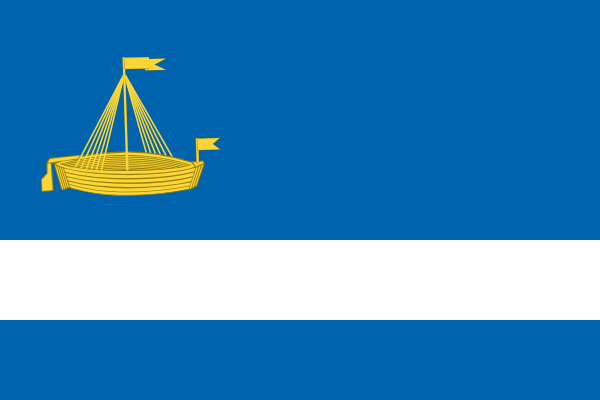
- Flag Coat of arms
- Interactive map of Tyumen
- Location of Tyumen Tyumen (Tyumen Oblast)
- Coordinates: 57°09′N 65°32′E
- Country: Russia
- Federal subject: Tyumen Oblast
- Founded: July 29, 1586

Government
  - Body: City Duma
  - Head: Maxim Afanasyef

Area
  - Total: 698 km^{2} (269 sq mi)
- Elevation: 102 m (335 ft)

Population (2010 Census)
  - Total: 581,907
  - Estimate (2025): 744,554 (+28%)
  - Rank: 25th in 2010
  - Density: 834/km^{2} (2,160/sq mi)

Administrative status
  - Subordinated to: City of Tyumen
  - Capital of: Tyumen Oblast, Tyumensky District

Municipal status
  - Urban okrug: Tyumen Urban Okrug
  - Capital of: Tyumen Urban Okrug, Tyumensky Municipal District
- Time zone: UTC+5 (MSK+2)
- Postal code: 625000
- Dialing code: +7 3452
- OKTMO ID: 71701000001
- City Day: Last Sunday of July
- Website: www.tyumen-city.ru

Tyumen (Note: /tjuːˈmɛn/ tyoo-MEN; Russian: Тюмень, IPA: [tʲʉˈmʲenʲ]) (Siberian Tatar: Цемкетора) is the administrative center and largest city of Tyumen Oblast, Russia. It is situated just east of the Ural Mountains, along the Tura River in North Asia. Fueled by the Russian oil and gas industry, Tyumen has experienced rapid population growth in recent years, rising to a population of 847,488 at the 2021 Census. Tyumen is among the largest cities of the Ural region and the Ural Federal District. Tyumen is often regarded as the first Siberian city, from the western direction.

Tyumen was the first Russian settlement in Siberia. Founded in 1586 to support Russia's eastward expansion, the city has remained one of the most important industrial and economic centers east of the Ural Mountains. Located at the junction of several important trade routes and with easy access to navigable waterways, Tyumen rapidly developed from a small military settlement to a large commercial and industrial city. The central part of Old Tyumen retains many historic buildings from throughout the city's history.

Tyumen is an important business center. It is the transport hub and industrial center of Tyumen Oblast – an oil-rich region bordering Kazakhstan – as well as the home of many companies active in Russia's oil and gas industry.

== Etymology ==
In Turkic and Mongolic languages, "Tümen/Түмэн" (in Siberian Tatar Tömän/Төмән) means a myriad, or ten thousand. Etymologically connected to the Tumen River that delineates sections of the borders between North Korea, Russia, and China.

== History ==
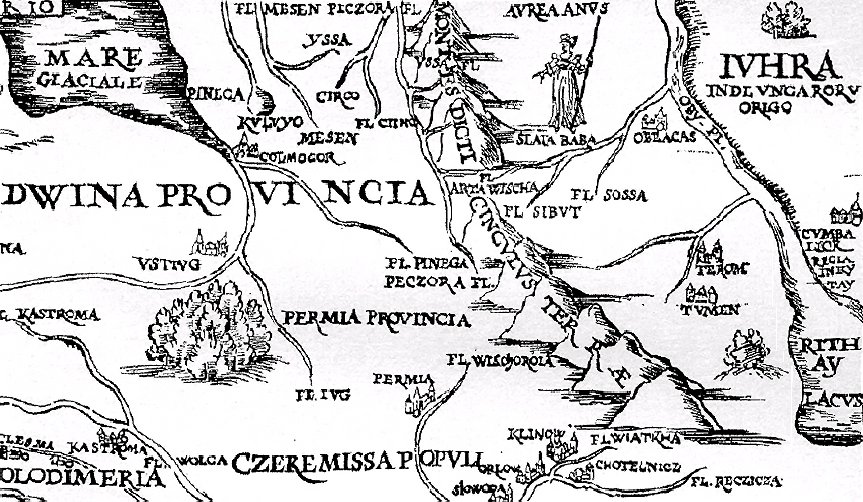
Tumen on Sigismund von Herberstein's map, published in 1549

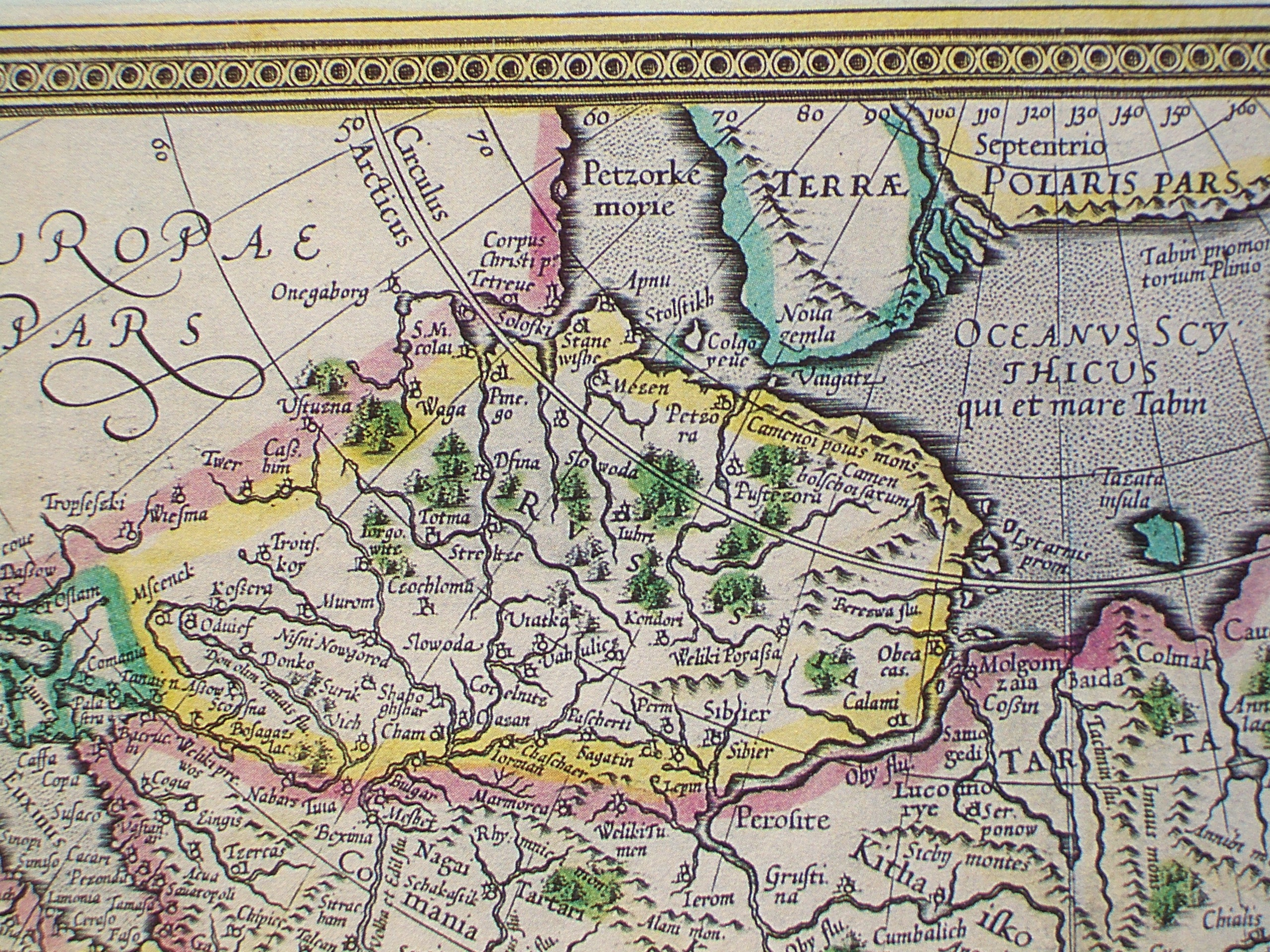
Weliki Tumen (the Great Tyumen) is shown on Gerhard Mercator's map of Asia (published in 1595) as located south of Perm and Sibier

The Cossack ataman Yermak Timofeyevich conquered the Tyumen area, originally part of the Siberian Khanate, for the Tsardom of Russia in 1585. The fighting completely destroyed both capitals of the Siberian Khanate, Sibir/Qashliq and Tyumen/Chimgi-Tura (the capital in the 15th century). Sibir was never rebuilt - though it gave its name to all concurrent and future lands in North Asia annexed by Russia - but Tyumen was later re-founded. On July 29, 1586, Tsar Feodor I ordered two regional commanders, Vasily Sukin and Ivan Myasnoy, to build a fortress (ostrog) on the site of the former Siberian Tatar town of Chingi-Tura ("Great city"), also known as Tyumen, from the Turkic and Mongol word for "ten thousand" – tumen.

Tyumen stood on the "Tyumen Portage", part of the historical trade-route between Central Asia and the Volga region. Various South Siberian nomads had continuously contested control of the portage in the preceding centuries, and Siberian Tatar and Kalmyk raiders often attacked early Russian settlers. The military situation meant that streltsy and Cossack garrisons stationed in the town predominated in the population of Tyumen until the mid-17th century. As the area became less restive, the town began to take on a less military character.

By the beginning of the 18th century, Tyumen had developed into an important center of trade between Siberia and China to the east and Central Russia to the west. A influx of prisoners-of-war from the Swedish army which surrendered after the Battle of Poltava in 1709 arrived in Tyumen - some of them settled permanently. Tyumen became an important industrial center, known for leatherworkers, blacksmiths, and other craftsmen. In 1763, 7,000 people were recorded as living in the town.

In the 19th century, the town's development continued. In 1836, the first steam boat in Siberia was built in Tyumen. In 1862 a telegraph service reached the town, and in 1864 the first water mains were laid. Further prosperity came to Tyumen after the construction, in 1885, of the Trans-Siberian Railway. For some years, Tyumen served as the Russian Empire's easternmost railhead and as the site of transhipment of cargoes between the railway and the cargo boats plying the Tura, Tobol, Irtysh, and Ob Rivers.

By the end of the 19th century, Tyumen's population exceeded 30,000, surpassing that of its northern rival Tobolsk, and beginning a process whereby Tyumen gradually eclipsed the former regional capital. The rise of Tyumen culminated on August 14, 1944 when the city finally became the administrative center of the extensive Tyumen Oblast.

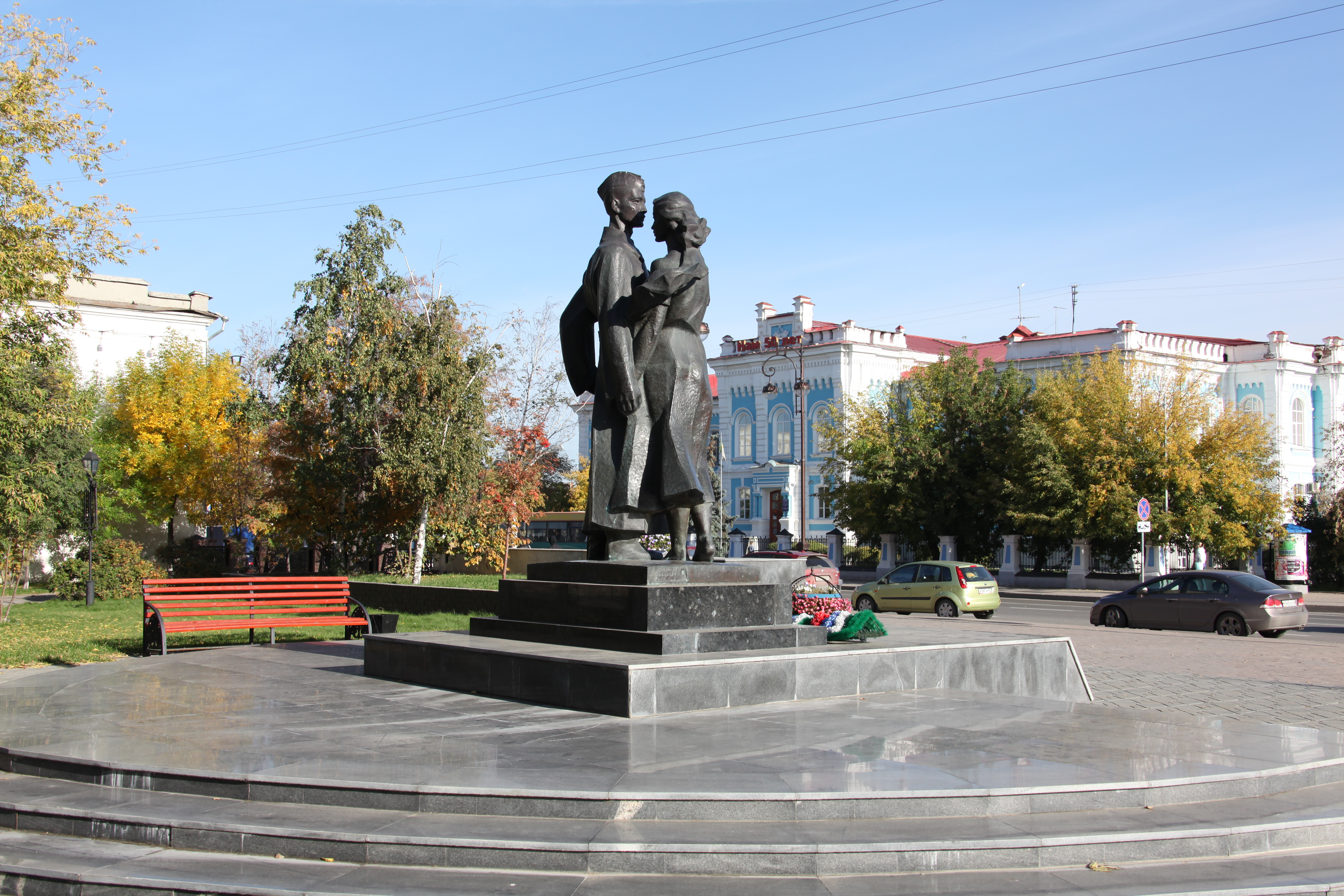
Monument to graduates of Tyumen schools killed in World War II

Early in the Russian Civil War in 1917, forces loyal to Admiral Alexander Kolchak and his Siberian White Army controlled Tyumen. Soviet insurrectionists took control on January 5, 1918; the White Army took over on 20 July 1918; and Red Army troops drove out Kolchak's forces on 8 August 1919.

During the 1930s, Tyumen became a major industrial center of the Soviet Union. By the onset of World War II, the city had several well-established industries, including shipbuilding, furniture manufacture, and the manufacture of fur- and leather-goods. World War II saw rapid growth and development in the city. In the winter of 1941, twenty-two major industrial enterprises evacuated to Tyumen from the European part of the Soviet Union. These enterprises went into operation the following spring. Additionally, war-time Tyumen became a "hospital city", where thousands of wounded soldiers were treated. When it seemed that Moscow might fall to German forces during Operation Barbarossa, in October 1941 Vladimir Lenin's body was secretly moved from his mausoleum in Moscow to a hidden tomb in what is now the Tyumen State Agriculture Academy. Between 1941 and 1945, more than 20,000 Tyumen natives fought at the front, and some 6,000 were killed.

Rich oil- and gas-fields were discovered in the Tyumen Oblast in the 1960s. While most of these lay hundreds of kilometers away, near the towns of Surgut and Nizhnevartovsk, Tyumen was the nearest railway junction and so the city became their supply base while the railway was extended northwards. As the result of this economic and population boom, with tens of thousands of skilled workers arriving from across the Soviet Union between 1963 and 1985, the rapid growth of the city also brought a host of problems. Its social infrastructure was limited and the lack of city-planning has resulted in uneven development, with which Tyumen has continued to struggle.

== Geography ==
Tyumen is located in Western Siberia, 1,700 km (1,100 mi) east of Moscow, 300 km (190 mi) east of Yekaterinburg, and 1,100 km (680 mi) west of Siberia's largest city, Novosibirsk. The city covers an area of 235 square kilometers (91 sq mi). Its primary geographical feature is the Tura River, which crosses the city from northwest to southeast. The river is navigable downstream of the city. The left bank of the Tura is a floodplain surrounded by gently rolling hills. The Tura is a shallow river with extensive marshlands.

The river floods during the snow melting season in the spring. The spring flood usually peaks in the second half of May, when the river becomes 8–10 times wider than during the late-summer low water season. The city is protected from flooding by a dike which can withstand floods up to 8 meters (26 ft) high. The highest ever flood water level in Tyumen was 9.15 meters (30.0 ft), recorded in 1979. More recently, in 2007, a water level of 7.76 was recorded. In spring 2005, a flood higher than the critical 8 meters (26 ft) mark was expected, but did not appear.

=== Climate ===
Tyumen has a strongly humid continental climate (Köppen climate classification Dfb) with warm, somewhat humid summers and long, very cold (though average by Siberian standards) winters. The weather in the region is very changeable, and the temperature in town is always higher than in the surrounding area by a few degrees. The town area also attracts more precipitation. The average temperature in January is −16.7 °C (1.9 °F), with a record low of −50 °C (−58 °F) measured in February 1951. The average temperature in July is +18.6 °C (65.5 °F), with a record high of +38 °C (100 °F).

The average annual precipitation is 457 millimeters (18.0 in). The wettest year on record was 1943, with 581 millimeters (22.9 in), and the driest was 1917, with only 231 millimeters (9.1 in).

Climate data for Tyumen (1991–2020, extremes 1885–present)
Month	Jan	Feb	Mar	Apr	May	Jun	Jul	Aug	Sep	Oct	Nov	Dec	Year
Record high °C (°F)	5.6 (42.1)	7.3 (45.1)	17.1 (62.8)	30.7 (87.3)	34.9 (94.8)	36.8 (98.2)	38.0 (100.4)	37.4 (99.3)	31.2 (88.2)	24.1 (75.4)	12.8 (55.0)	9.0 (48.2)	38.0 (100.4)
Mean daily maximum °C (°F)	−11.0 (12.2)	−7.7 (18.1)	0.4 (32.7)	10.0 (50.0)	18.5 (65.3)	23.1 (73.6)	24.4 (75.9)	21.6 (70.9)	15.2 (59.4)	7.5 (45.5)	−3.2 (26.2)	−9.2 (15.4)	7.5 (45.5)
Daily mean °C (°F)	−15.1 (4.8)	−12.9 (8.8)	−4.9 (23.2)	4.3 (39.7)	12.0 (53.6)	17.0 (62.6)	18.7 (65.7)	16.1 (61.0)	10.0 (50.0)	3.3 (37.9)	−6.6 (20.1)	−12.9 (8.8)	2.4 (36.3)
Mean daily minimum °C (°F)	−19.2 (−2.6)	−17.6 (0.3)	−9.8 (14.4)	−0.8 (30.6)	5.8 (42.4)	11.1 (52.0)	13.4 (56.1)	11.2 (52.2)	5.6 (42.1)	−0.2 (31.6)	−9.9 (14.2)	−16.6 (2.1)	−2.2 (28.0)
Record low °C (°F)	−46.2 (−51.2)	−43.7 (−46.7)	−38.4 (−37.1)	−23.2 (−9.8)	−10.2 (13.6)	−1.9 (28.6)	0.7 (33.3)	−1.0 (30.2)	−8.6 (16.5)	−26.7 (−16.1)	−41.0 (−41.8)	−49.2 (−56.6)	−49.2 (−56.6)
Average precipitation mm (inches)	21 (0.8)	15 (0.6)	22 (0.9)	24 (0.9)	44 (1.7)	61 (2.4)	86 (3.4)	60 (2.4)	45 (1.8)	37 (1.5)	34 (1.3)	25 (1.0)	474 (18.7)
Average extreme snow depth cm (inches)	32 (13)	40 (16)	37 (15)	8 (3.1)	0 (0)	0 (0)	0 (0)	0 (0)	0 (0)	1 (0.4)	9 (3.5)	22 (8.7)	40 (16)
Average rainy days	0.4	0.2	2	9	16	17	17	19	19	13	4	0	117
Average snowy days	24	19	15	8	4	0.2	0	0	2	11	20	23	126
Average relative humidity (%)	80	76	70	62	58	65	72	77	77	77	80	80	73
Mean monthly sunshine hours	68.2	123.2	167.4	243.0	272.8	300.0	328.6	238.7	165.0	102.3	69.0	55.8	2,134
Source 1: Pogoda.ru.net
Source 2: Climatebase (sun, 1933–2011)

=== Cityscape ===
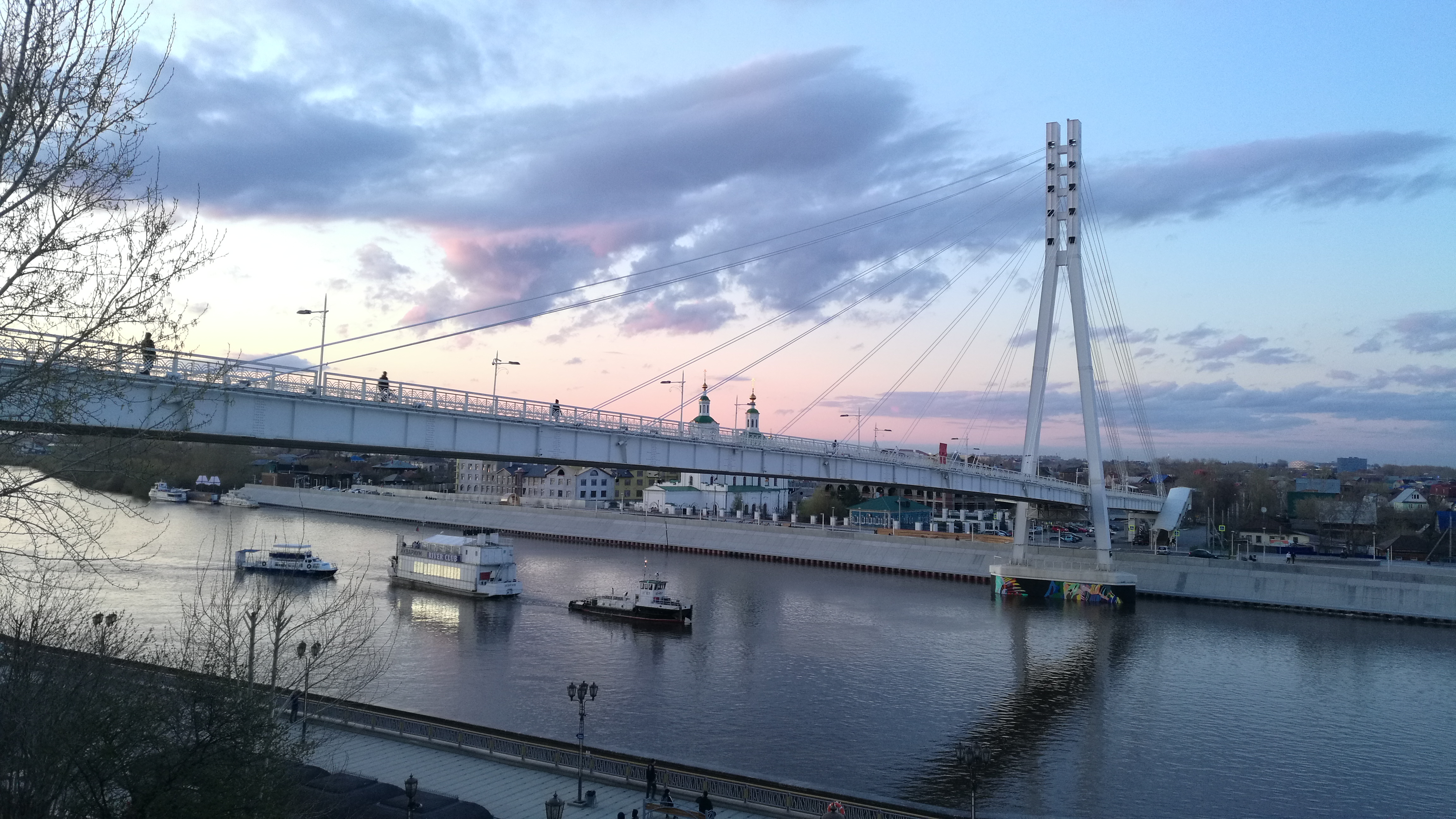
Tyumen Footbridge

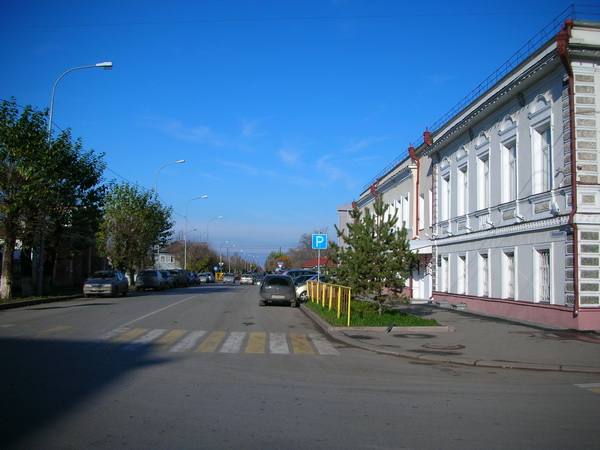
Yamskaya Sloboda

Historically, Tyumen occupied a small area on the high bank of the Tura River around the foundation site of the city. The city consisted of one and two-storey wooden buildings, surrounded by a number of villages. With time, the territory of the city was developed and extended by including the surrounding villages.

When viewed from above, present-day Tyumen appears to be a collection of low-rise towns with occasional clusters of tall buildings. Two areas of the city, Yamskaya Sloboda and Republic Street are noted for their historic character. These areas are dominated by old brick and wooden merchant houses and buildings, with the occasional intrusion of mid-century Soviet low-rise buildings.

Bukharskaya Sloboda is a historic residential area on the low bank of the Tura river. This area is mostly made up of very old one and two-storey wooden buildings. The area is part of the Historical Centre on the city and has a mostly Muslim population. Low bank Dormitories is a cluster of standard 9-storey buildings was built on reclaimed land east of Bukharskaya Sloboda – Zareka and Vatutina.

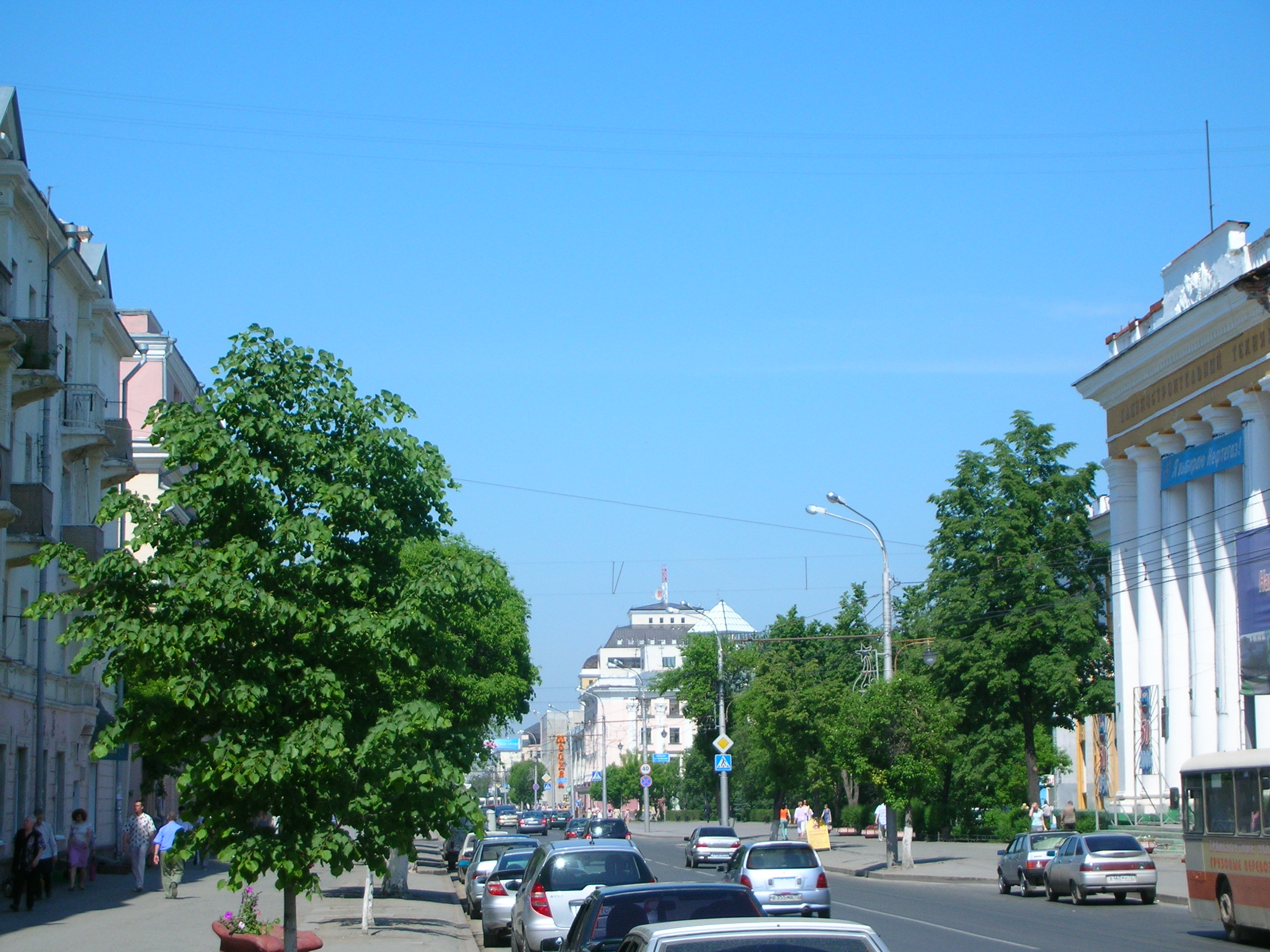
Center Republic St.

The area to the east of the historical town centre built between 1948 and 1978 and is mostly 4 and 5-storey buildings. Earlier buildings in this area have individual designs, but the later buildings have a rectangular style. This area contains most of the political and business activities of the town.

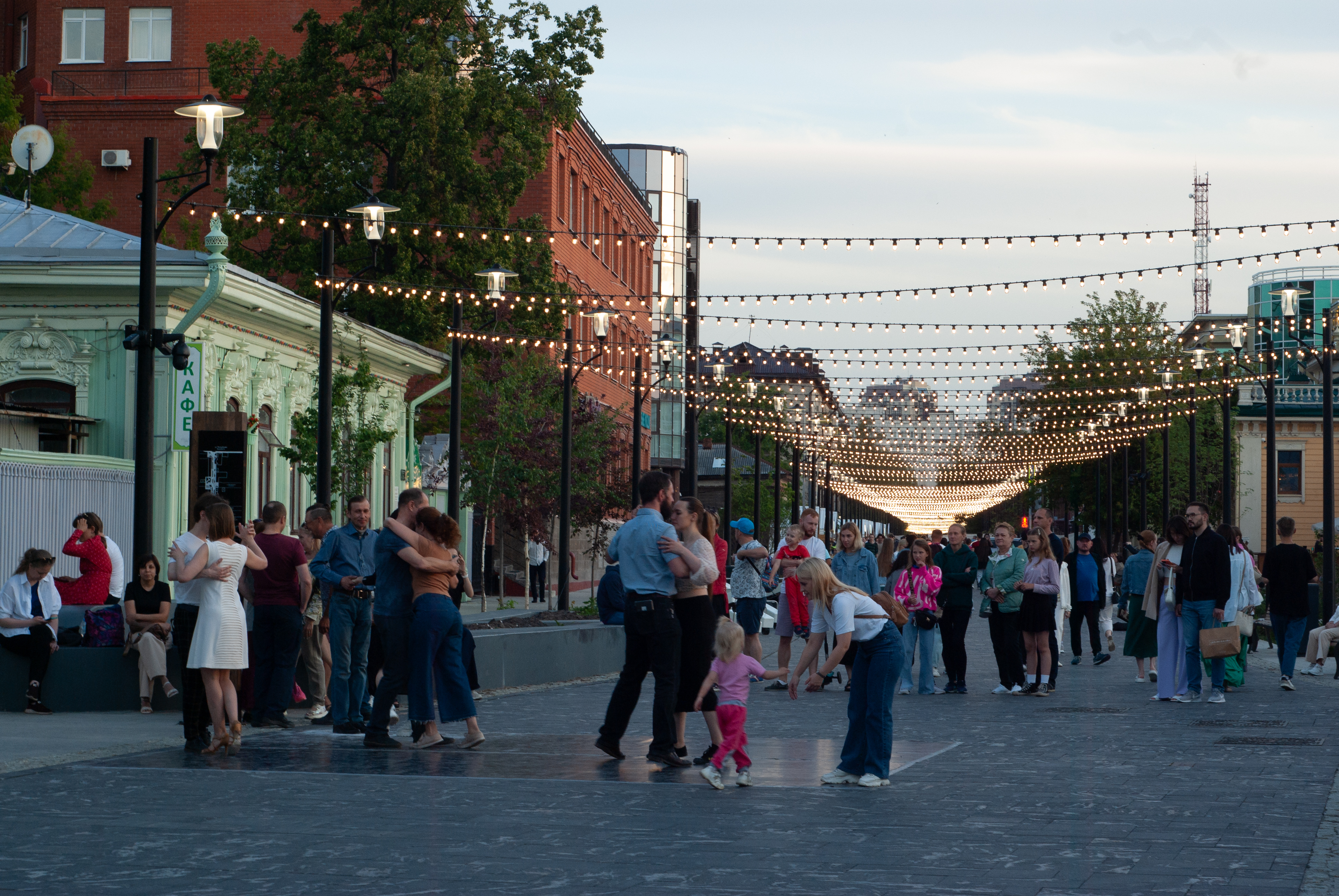
Dzerzhinskogo Street

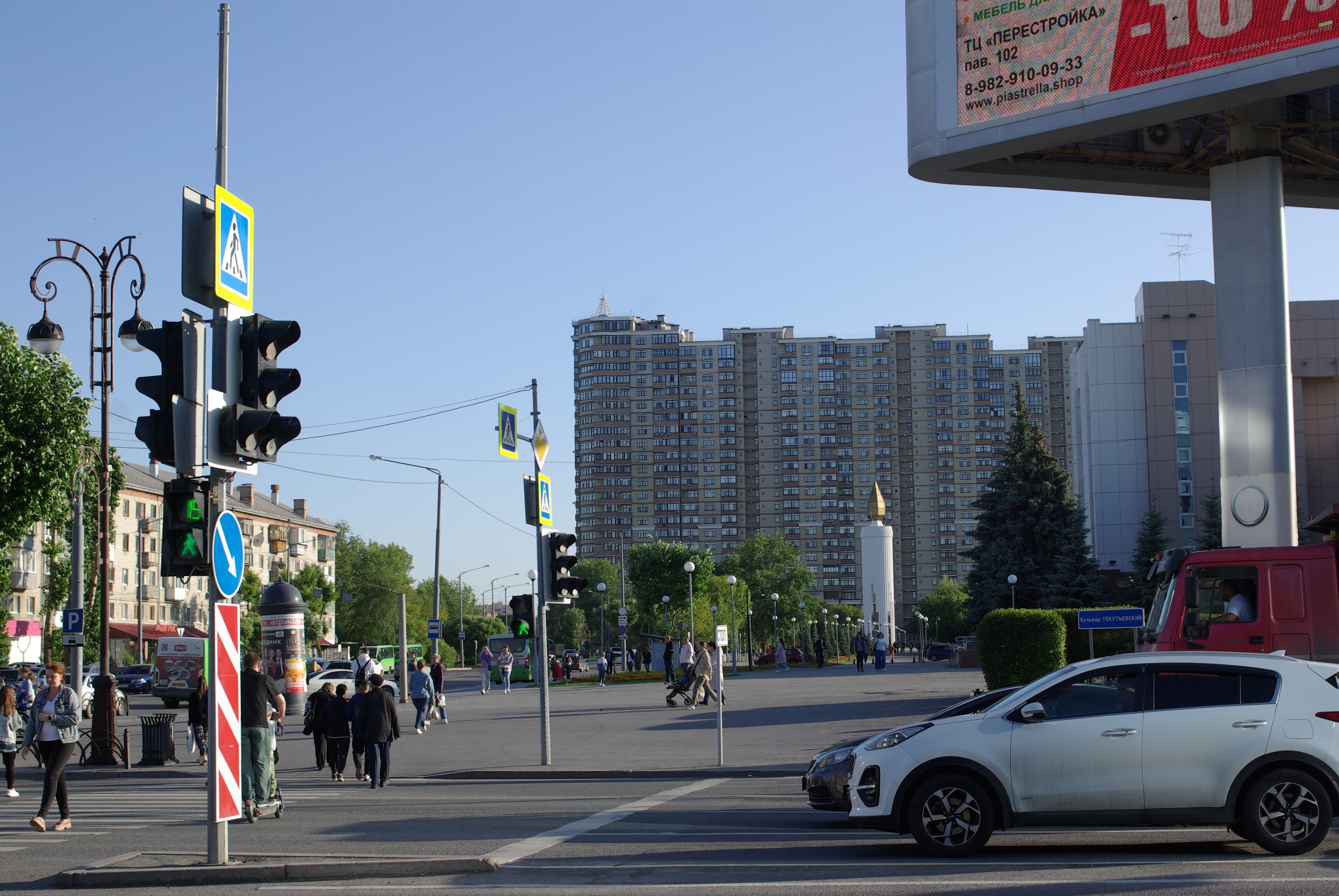
Melnikaitė Street

The Old Dormitories area features standard five-storey blocks of flats constructed in the 1960s and 1970s at the west and east extremities of the city. However, today this area is actually in the town centre. While there are almost no variety in the area's architecture, this area has the most greenery in the city and the best social infrastructure.

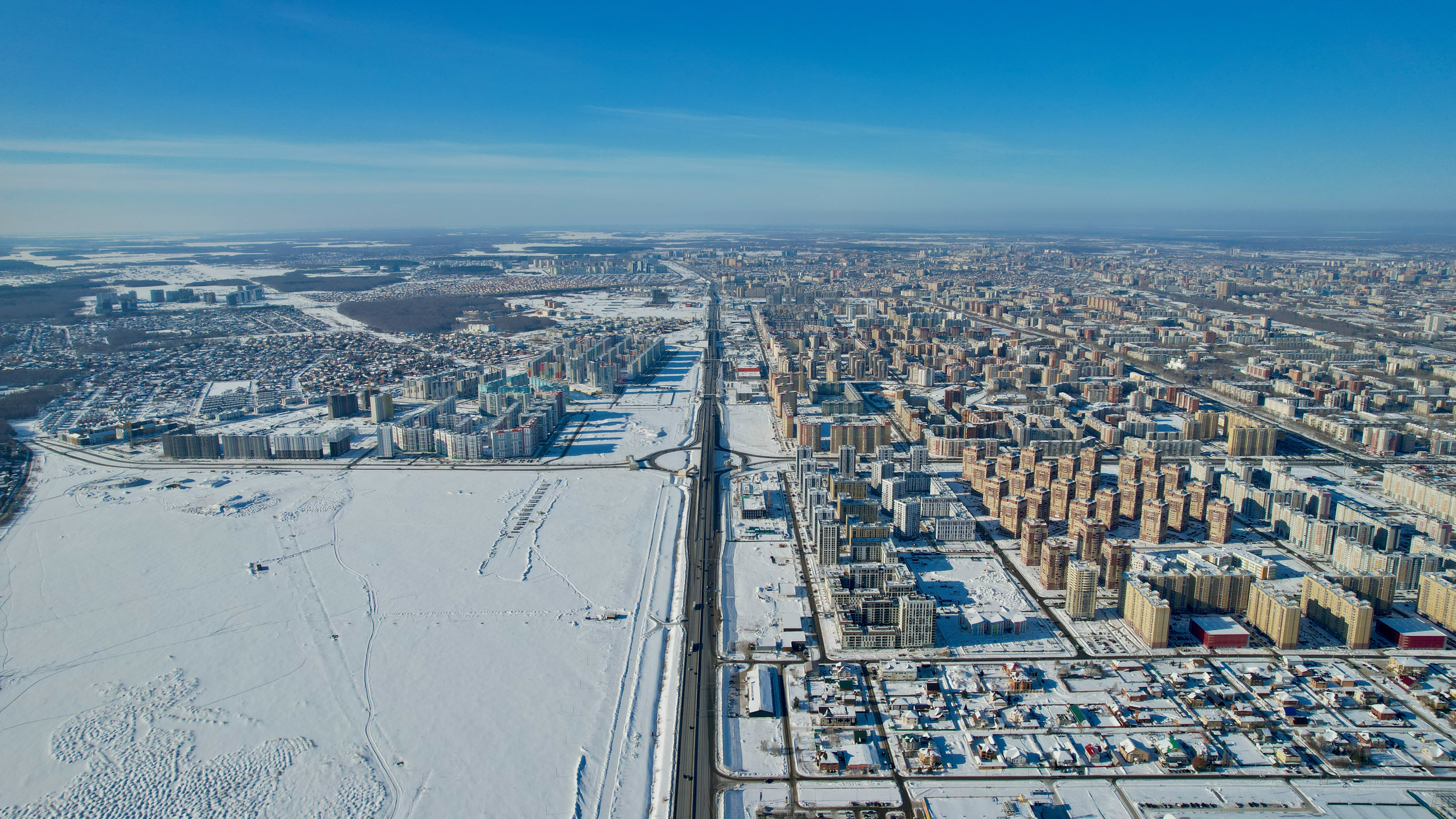
Aerial view of Tyumen

The New Dormitories area features clusters of standard tall buildings constructed after 1980 at the south and south-east edges of Tyumen. This area is considered to be the worst place to live in the city. The area is remote, badly planned, and has very poor social infrastructure.

In 2022, the Ministry of Construction published an updated rating of the new urban digitalization index. Tyumen entered the top three cities with a population of 250 thousand to a million people.

==== Architecture ====
Tyumen is not characterized by any particular architectural style. The town was built without planning for decades and because of that its architecture is an eclectic mix of buildings of different styles and eras.

Tyumen's nickname is the Capital of Villages because most of its territory is built up by lumber houses. Many of the wooden buildings located in the historical part of the city are considered culturally valuable.

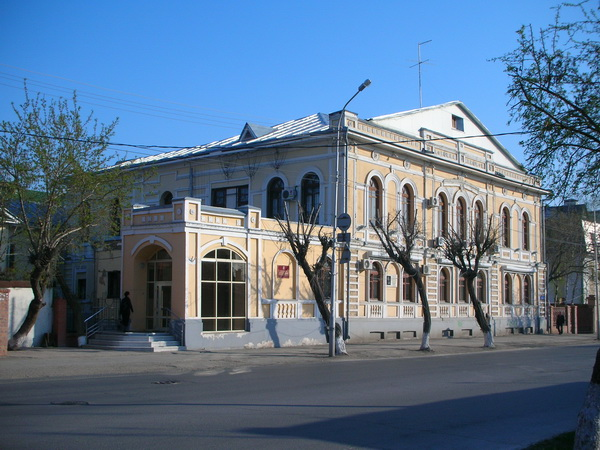

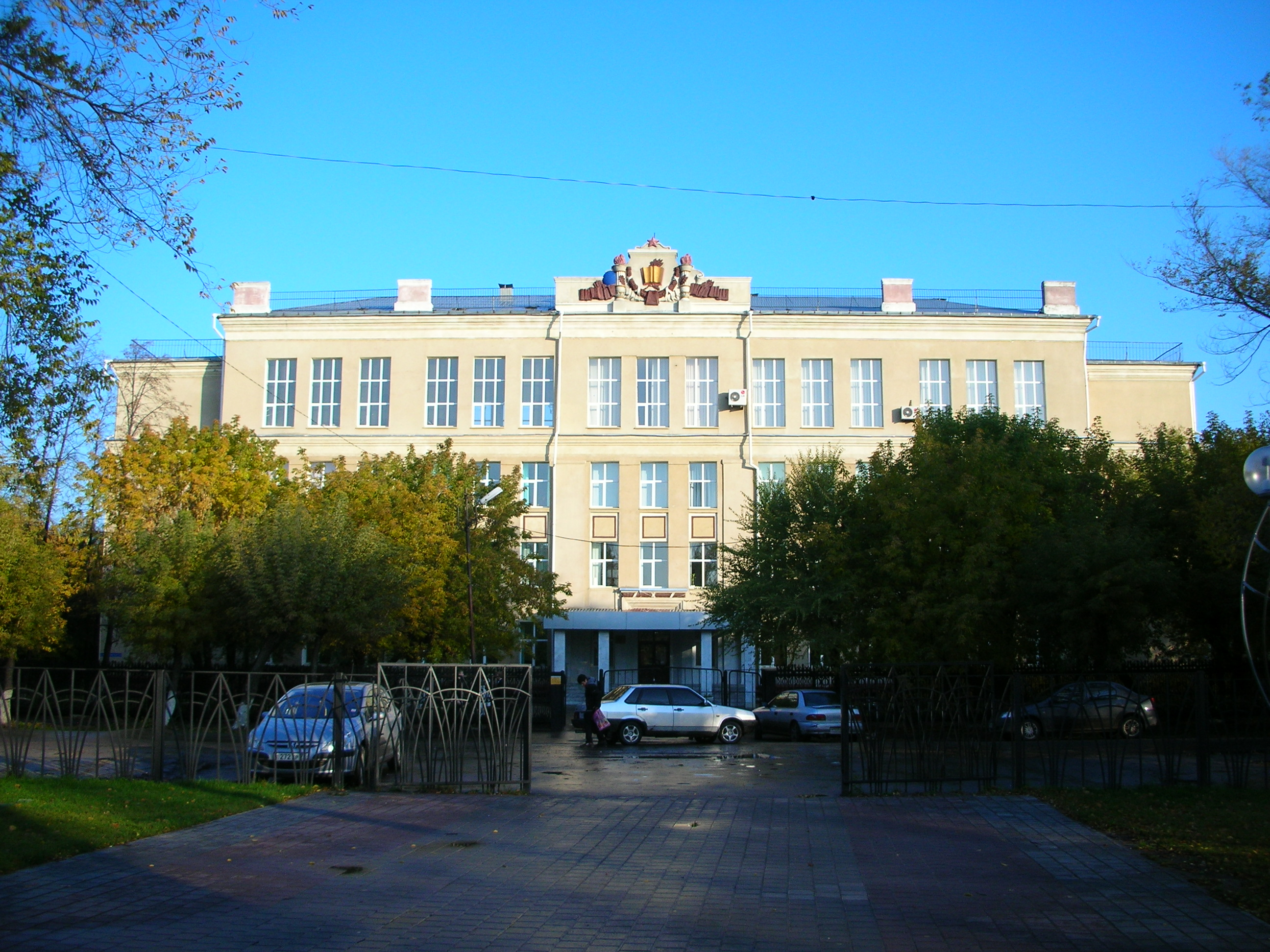

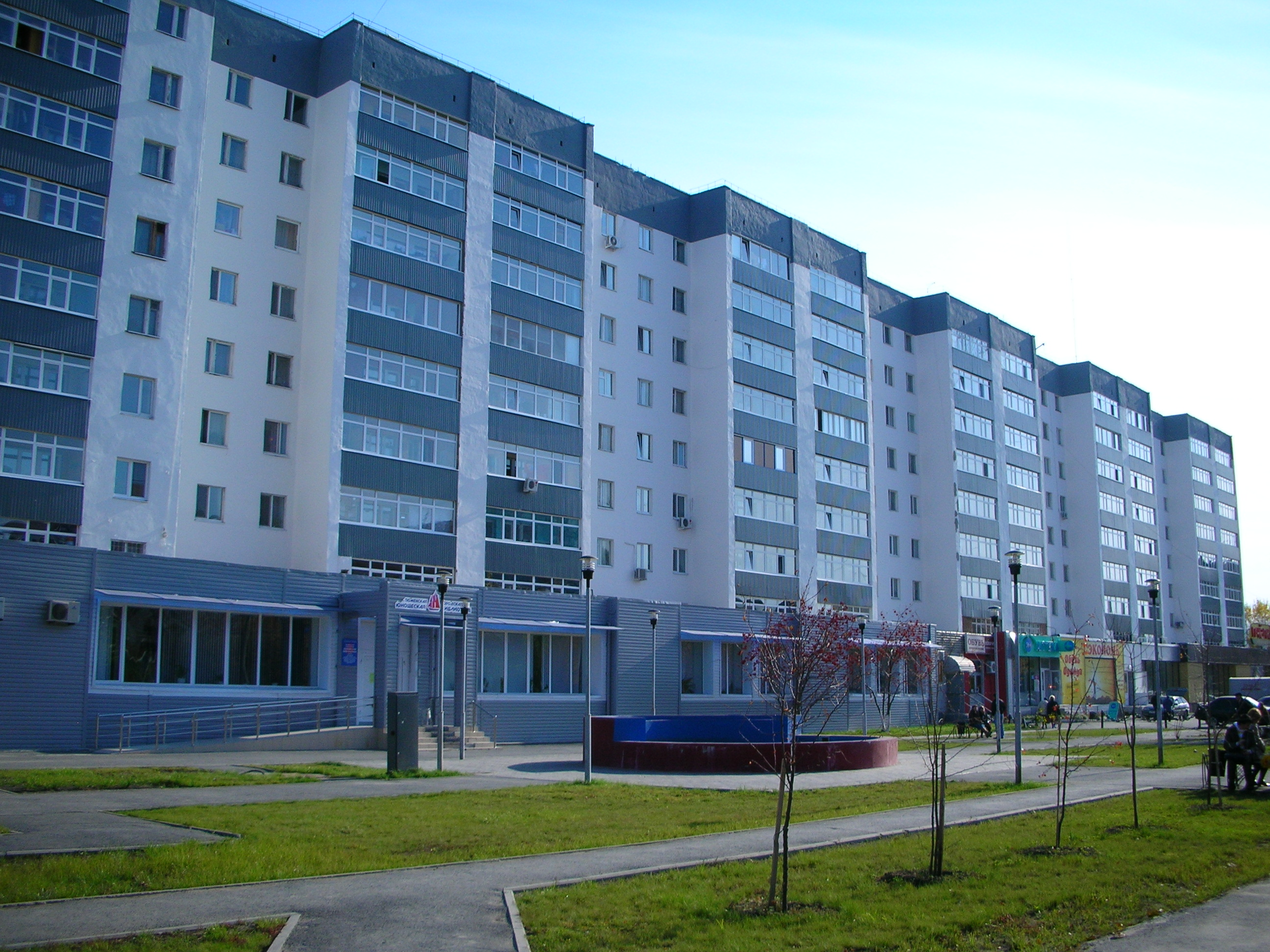

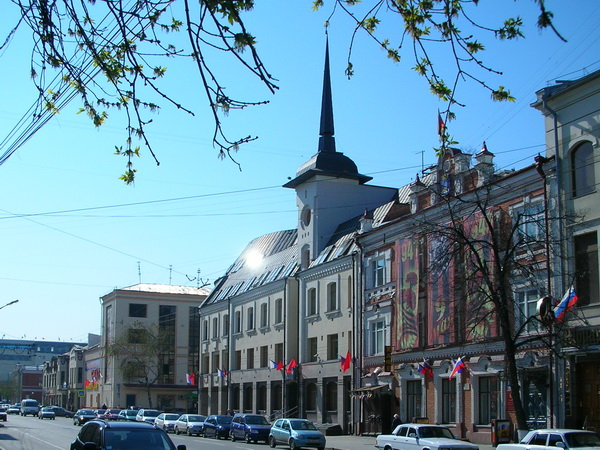

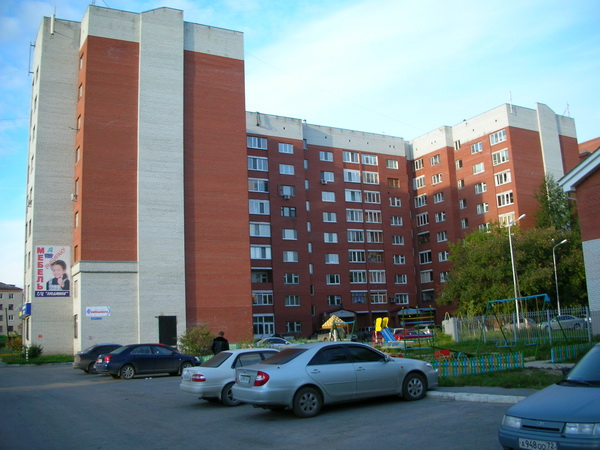

== Administrative and municipal status ==
Tyumen is the administrative center of the oblast and, within the framework of administrative divisions, it also serves as the administrative center of Tyumensky District, even though it is not a part of it. As an administrative division, it is incorporated separately as the City of Tyumen—an administrative unit with the status equal to that of the districts. As a municipal division, the City of Tyumen is incorporated as Tyumen Urban Okrug.

=== City divisions ===
Tyumen is divided into four administrative okrugs: Kalininsky, Leninsky, Tsentralny, and Vostochny.

== Government ==
=== City government ===
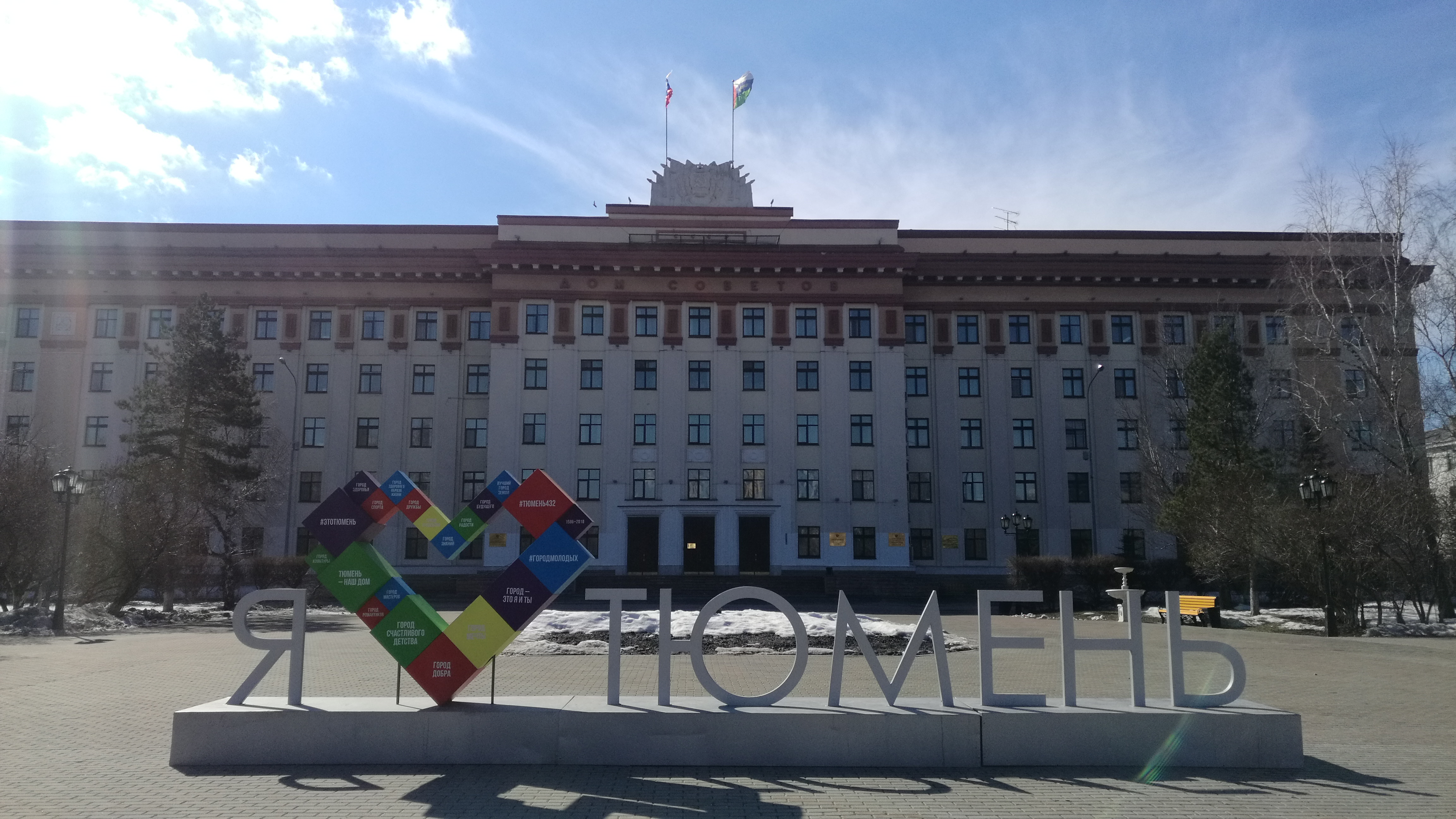
Tyumen Oblast Duma

The legislative authority of Tyumen is the City Duma. In addition to legislative activities, the City Duma appoints the Head of the Tyumen City Administration, who is the chief executive officer of the city.

=== Oblast government ===
Since Tyumen is the administrative center of the oblast, all the governing bodies of the oblast are located in the city. They include the elected Legislative Assembly (Duma) of Tyumen Oblast, which also confirms the appointment of the Governor of Tyumen Oblast, who is nominated by the President of Russia.

== Demographics ==
Historical population
Year	Pop.	±%
1897	29,500	—
1926	50,252	+70.3%
1939	79,205	+57.6%
1959	150,195	+89.6%
1970	268,526	+78.8%
1979	358,992	+33.7%
1989	476,869	+32.8%
2002	510,719	+7.1%
2010	581,907	+13.9%
2021	847,488	+45.6%

Tyumen's population grew steadily from the 16th century through the 19th century. However, when the Trans-Siberian Railway arrived at the end of the 19th century, the town's rate of population growth was greatly boosted. Tyumen rapidly became the largest town in the region, with about 30,000 inhabitants by the beginning of the 20th century. Tyumen again experienced rapid population growth with the coming of World War II. The evacuation of workers from factories in central Russia in 1941 more than doubled Tyumen's population to 150,000.

In the 1960s, the discovery of the rich oil and gas fields in Western Siberia caused the city's population, which had not been forecast to exceed 250,000 inhabitants that decade, to swell to almost half a million. After the growth of the 1960s, a period of population stability lasted until 1988, when economic depression hit the Soviet Union. The city's population in 1989 was 476,869, according to the census of that year. However, within five or six years Tyumen was again a major economic center with a rising population. By 2002, Tyumen's population had risen to 510,719. Further population growth (mainly due to migration and the incorporation of surrounding settlements) meant that by 2021 Tyumen's population increased to 847,488 inhabitants.

=== Ethnic groups ===
While the population of Tyumen includes people from over a hundred different ethnicities, most belong to one of the following ethnicities:

Ethnicity (2010)	Population	Percentage
Russians	448,186	84.4%
Tatars	53,984	6.1%
Ukrainians	9,312	1.7%
Azerbaijanis	6,153	1.1%
Others	36,788	6.7%

=== Religion ===
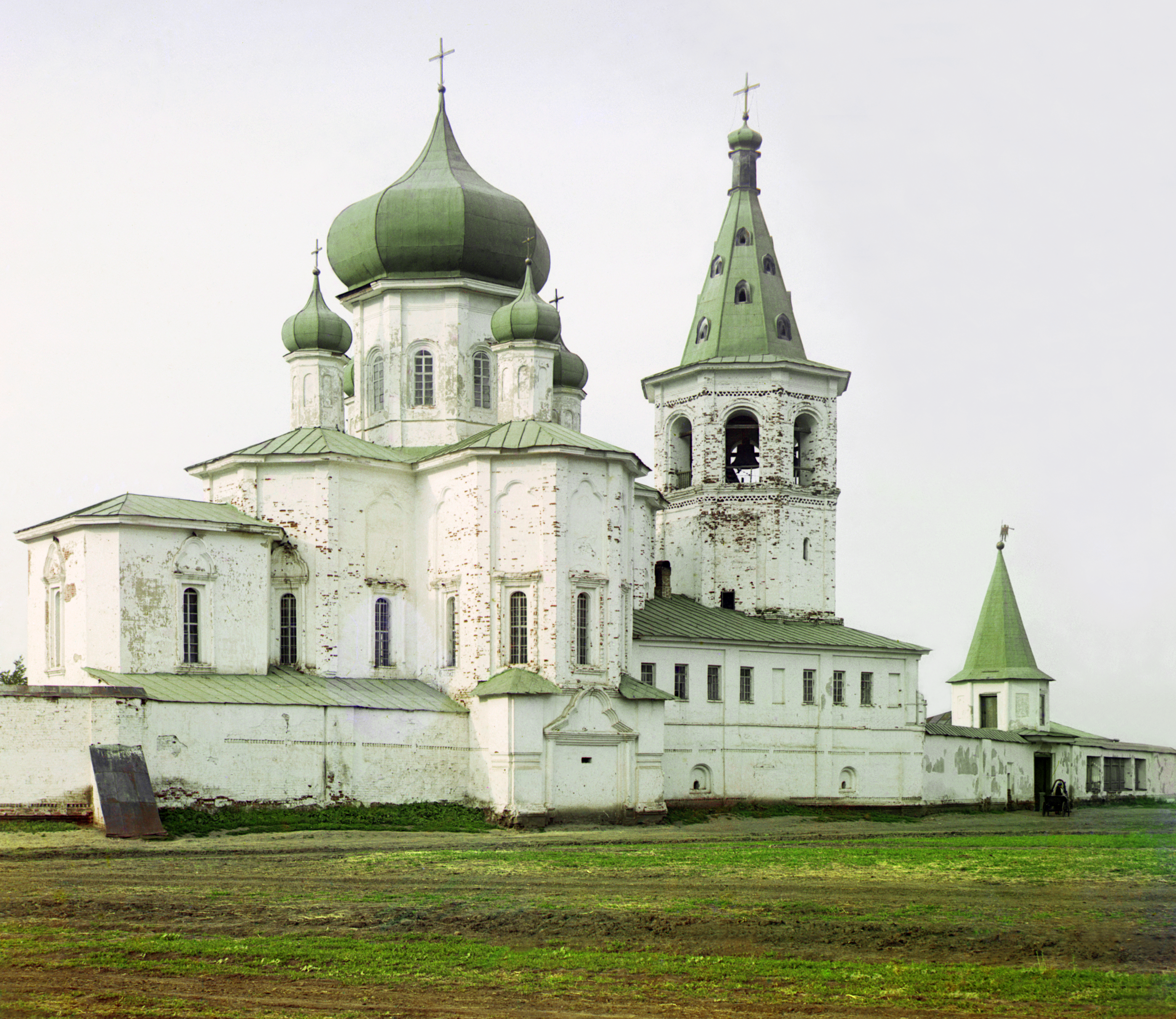
The mid-18th-century Trinity Monastery in Tyumen, as photographed c. 1912 by Sergey Prokudin-Gorsky

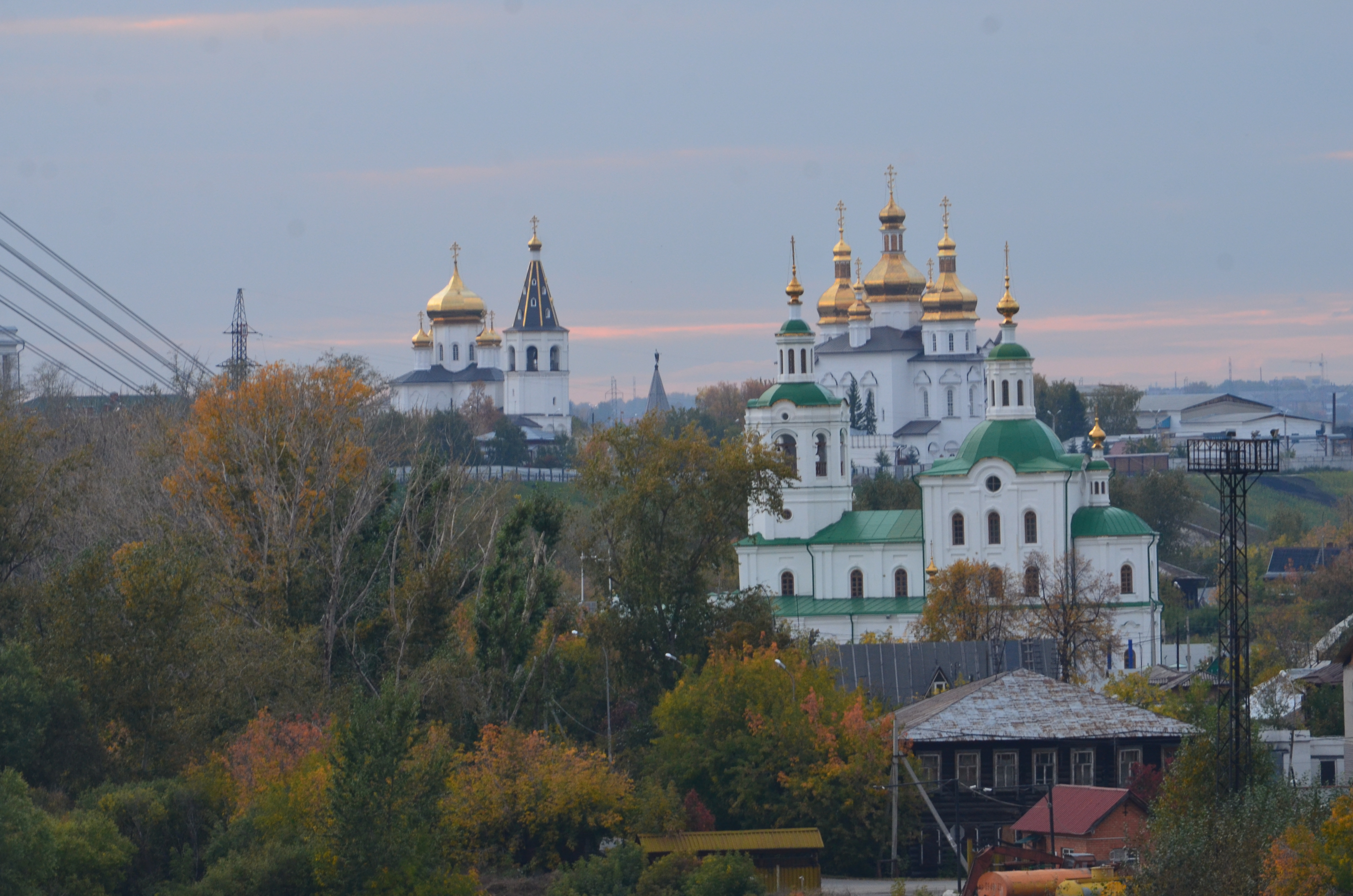
The Trinity Monastery

As of 2009, there are over ten operational Orthodox temples (both newly built and historical), two mosques (both newly built), one synagogue, and one Roman Catholic church in Tyumen (St. Joseph's Church).

==== Orthodox Christianity ====
While the state religion of the Russian Empire was Orthodoxy, this religion historically prevailed in Tyumen. In 1616, Trinity Monastery was established in Tyumen by Nifont of Kazan. In 1709–1711, this monastery was rebuilt in stone by the order of Filofey Leshchinsky, the first Metropolitan of Siberia. In 1761, the Tyumen Religious School was established. Overall, from 1708 to 1885, twelve stone Orthodox churches of different size, and two monasteries were constructed in Tyumen.

During Soviet times, two of the churches were completely destroyed, but the rest remained. As of 2008, most of them are accessible and operating. Some operational churches are also under restoration. Tyumen Religious School was reopened in 1997.

==== Other religions ====
Despite the predominance of Orthodoxy, Catholic churches as well as mosques and synagogues were also built. However, only one Catholic church remains preserved. The Tyumen Mosque was completely destroyed, but its reconstruction on the same site caused controversy. The Tyumen synagogue collapsed in 2000, but was reconstructed on the same site. At the start of the 20th century, there was a strong Old Believers community in Tyumen.

All of the aforementioned religions operate cultural centers in Tyumen. There are also several other religious bodies with a few adherents in Tyumen.

Tyumen Trinity Monastery was built with special permission of Peter the Great. At the time, the construction of stone buildings outside Saint Petersburg was prohibited. The Church of Savior Uncreated was visited by Crown prince Alexandr (later Alexander II) during his Siberian tour.

== Economy ==
Tyumen is an important service center for the gas and oil industries in Russia. Due to its advantageous location at the crossing of the motor, rail, water and air ways and its moderate climate Tyumen was an ideal base town for servicing the oil and gas industry of the West Siberia. As a result, today Tyumen is a center of industry, science, culture, education and medicine. Many large oil and gas companies such as Gazprom, LUKoil, Gazpromneft and Shell have their representative offices in Tyumen.

There are numerous factories, engineering companies, oil industry service companies (KCA DEUTAG and Schlumberger), design institutes, shipyard and other oil servicing companies located in Tyumen.

== Transportation ==
=== Railway ===
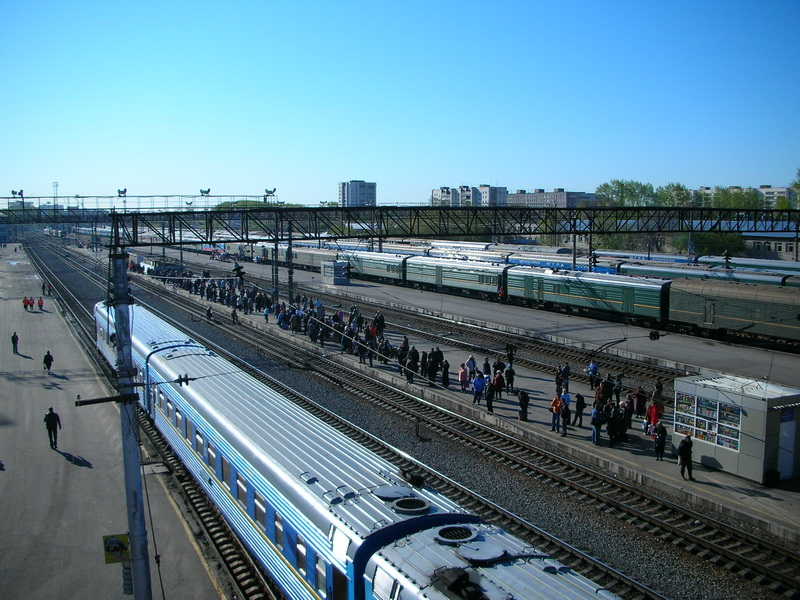
Tyumen railway station Tracks 2008

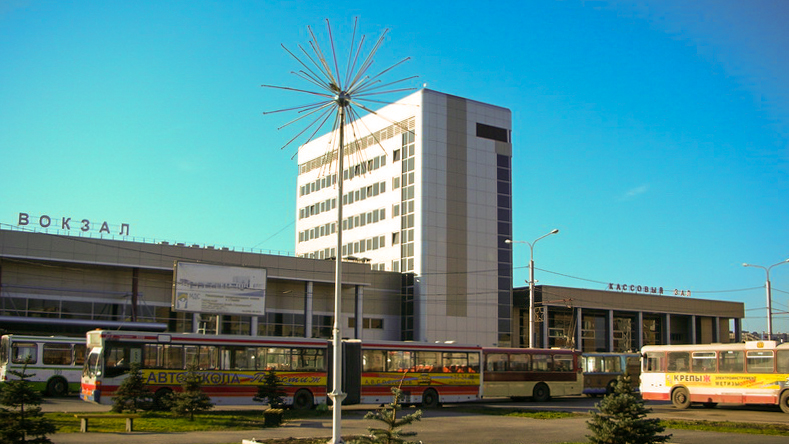
Tyumen Railway Station Terminal 2008

Tyumen railway station was built in 1885. Currently the station administratively belongs to the Tyumen Division of Sverdlovskaya Rail Road. The station is located in the center of the city. At the regional level, the station services three directions to Yekaterinburg, Omsk, and Tobolsk. The railroad to Yekaterinburg has been electrified since 1980. At the international level, the station services passage to (Trans-Siberian Railway): Poland, Germany, China, Mongolia, and Azerbaijan.

Additional stations within the city territory include: Tyumen North, Tyumen yard, Voynovka yard.

=== Public transportation ===
Public transportation in Tyumen is dominated by both municipal bus services and by numerous private operators (marshrutkas), which account for nearly a third of all transport capacity. The city's bus fleet is in process of modernization and expansion, with newly acquired Russian buses replacing the severely aged Soviet models.

Tyumen is a major hub for intercity bus service, centered on the bus terminal, which was constructed in 1972, and greatly expanded between 2006 and 2008.

=== Air transportation ===
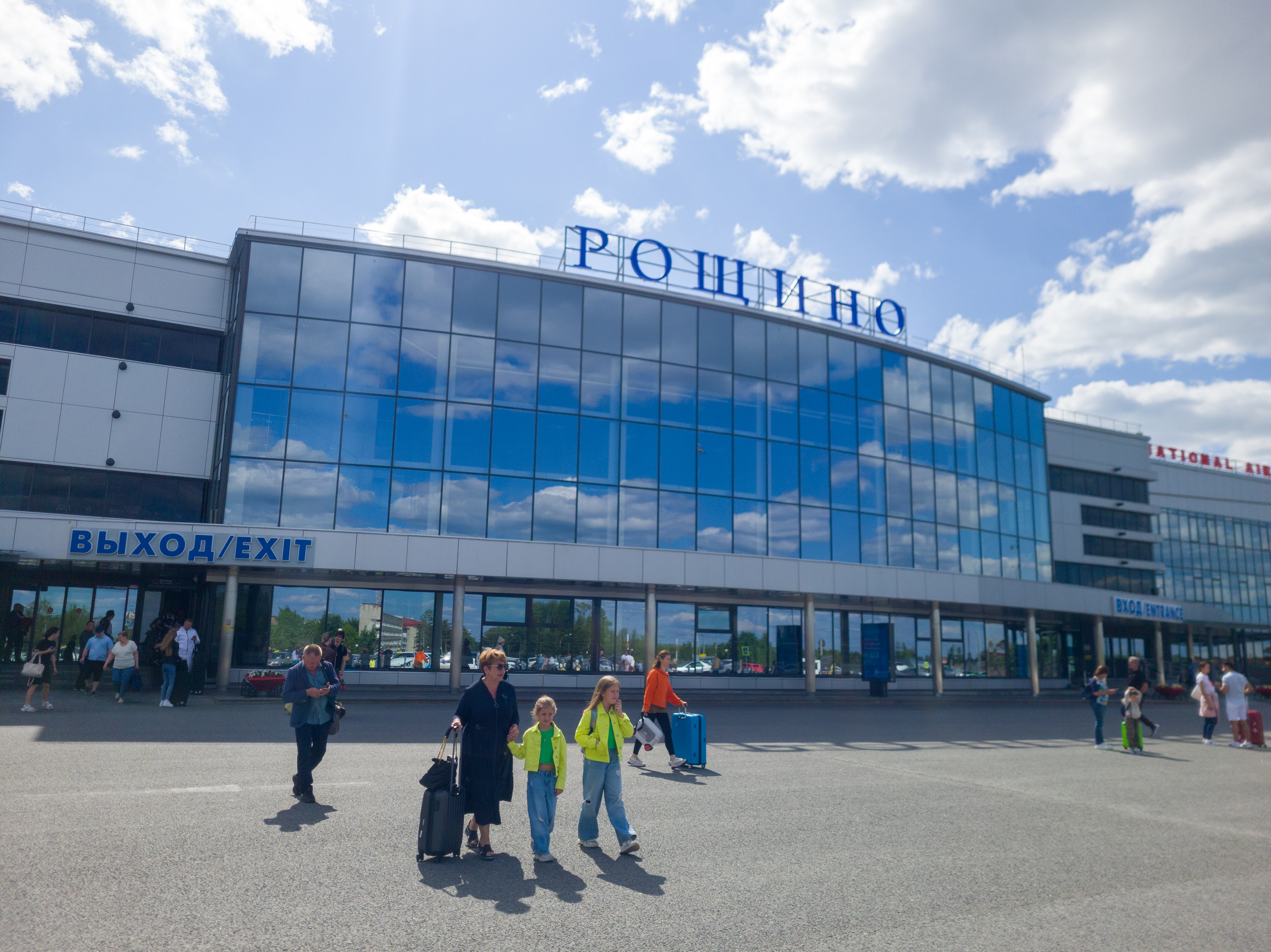
Roschino International Airport of Tyumen in 2023

Tyumen is served by the international Roschino Airport located 13 kilometres (8 miles) west of the city. In addition Plekhanovo Airport is in the area. The Roschino airport has permits to handle the following types of aircraft: Tu-154, Tu-134, An-12, An-24, An-26, Yak-40, Yak-42, IL-18, L-410, B-737, B-767, B-757, IL-86, IL-76, ATR-42, ATR-72, HS-125. The airport also has a permit to handle all types of helicopters. The airstrip is capable of handling large freight aircraft such as the An-22 Antaeus.

The city has a regular service to a large number of Russian towns, including, Moscow (9 flights a day), St. Petersburg, and Samara. There are also weekly or biweekly flights to the following international locations: Baku, Erevan, Khujand, and Tashkent.

=== Roads ===
Tyumen is divided by the Tura River, the Tyumenka River, and the Trans-Siberian Railroad, creating several isolated zones. Ten bridges, one footbridge, seven flyovers, and five foot crossings connect these zones.

In addition, the road network was planned before the fall of the Soviet Union, and in its current state, it can operate normally only in the scheme which includes public transportation only. Compact planning of the city center prevents expansion of main roads; congestion coming from the city periphery moves slower and slower as it approaches the town center. To date, the road network serves about 200% above planned capacity, which leads to numerous traffic jams and high accident rates.

Since 2002, city and regional authorities have undertaken numerous initiatives to improve Tyumen's road network, but due to the continued growth of private automobile ownership rates, these efforts have only had short term positive effects. To date, a complex transport infrastructure reconstruction project is being directed by Regional Administration. In January 2015, a paid parking program and prohibition of vehicle access for non-residents began.

- Total length of the city roads: 925 kilometres (575 miles) (Jan 2009).
- Total number of cars: 380,000 of 1,176,441 total in Tyumen Oblast (as of March 2015), previous count 151,000 (Jan. 2008).

== Society and culture ==
=== Leisure and entertainment ===
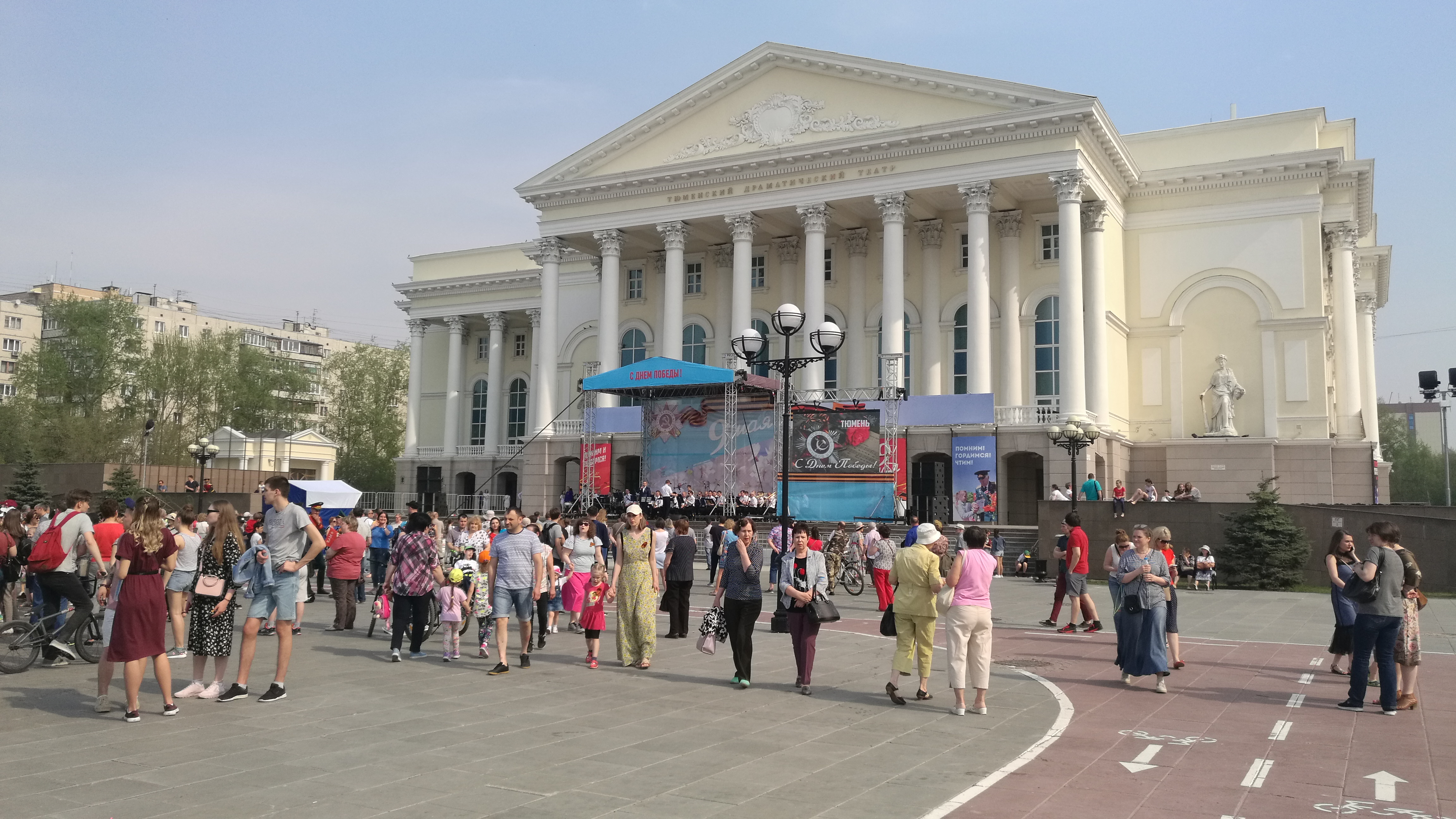
Tyumen Theater of the Drama and the Comedy

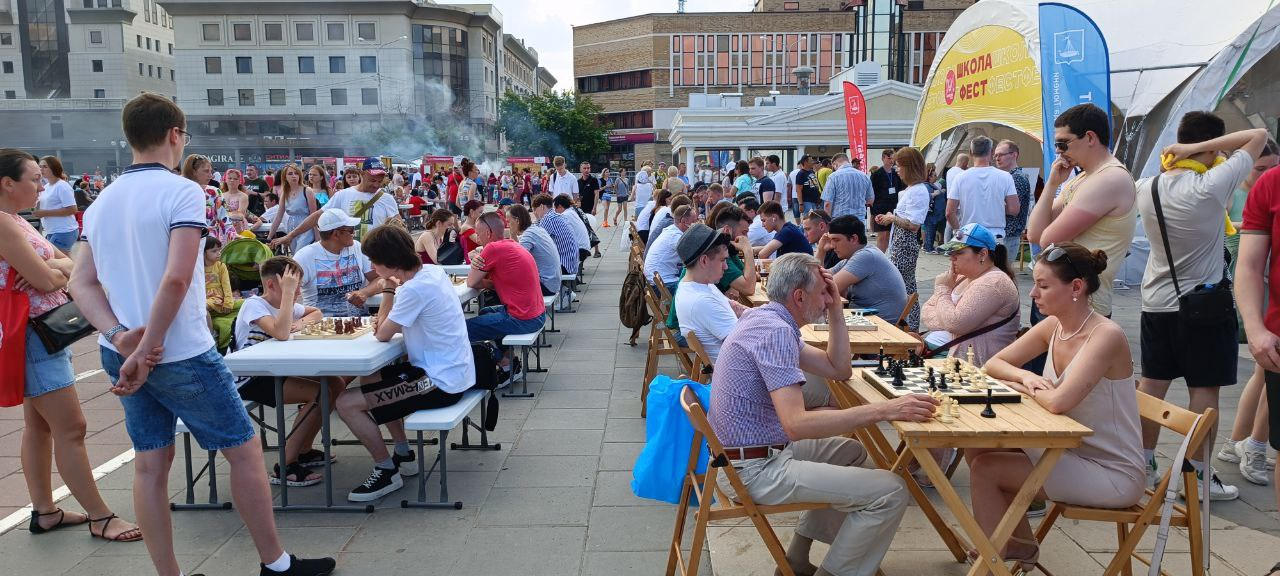
Outdoor chess in Tyumen

Tyumen has many cinemas and clubs.

=== Literature and film ===
A writer closely associated with the city is the children's writer Vladislav Krapivin.

=== Museums and art galleries ===
Museums and art galleries in Tyumen include the Tyumen Museum of Local Lore, the Tyumen Museum of the Fine Arts, Museum of Kolokolnikov estate and the Medical History Museum.

=== Music ===
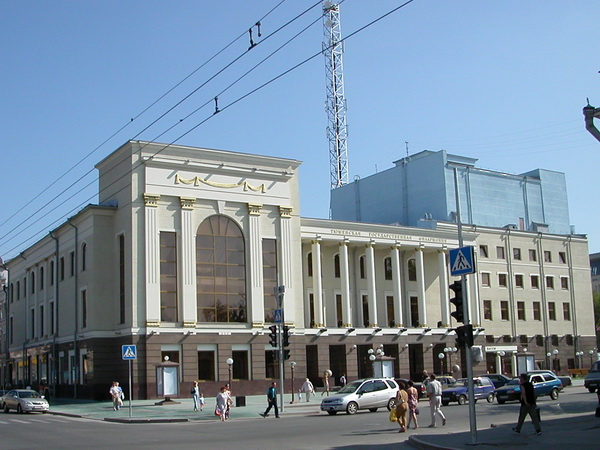
Tyumen philharmonic

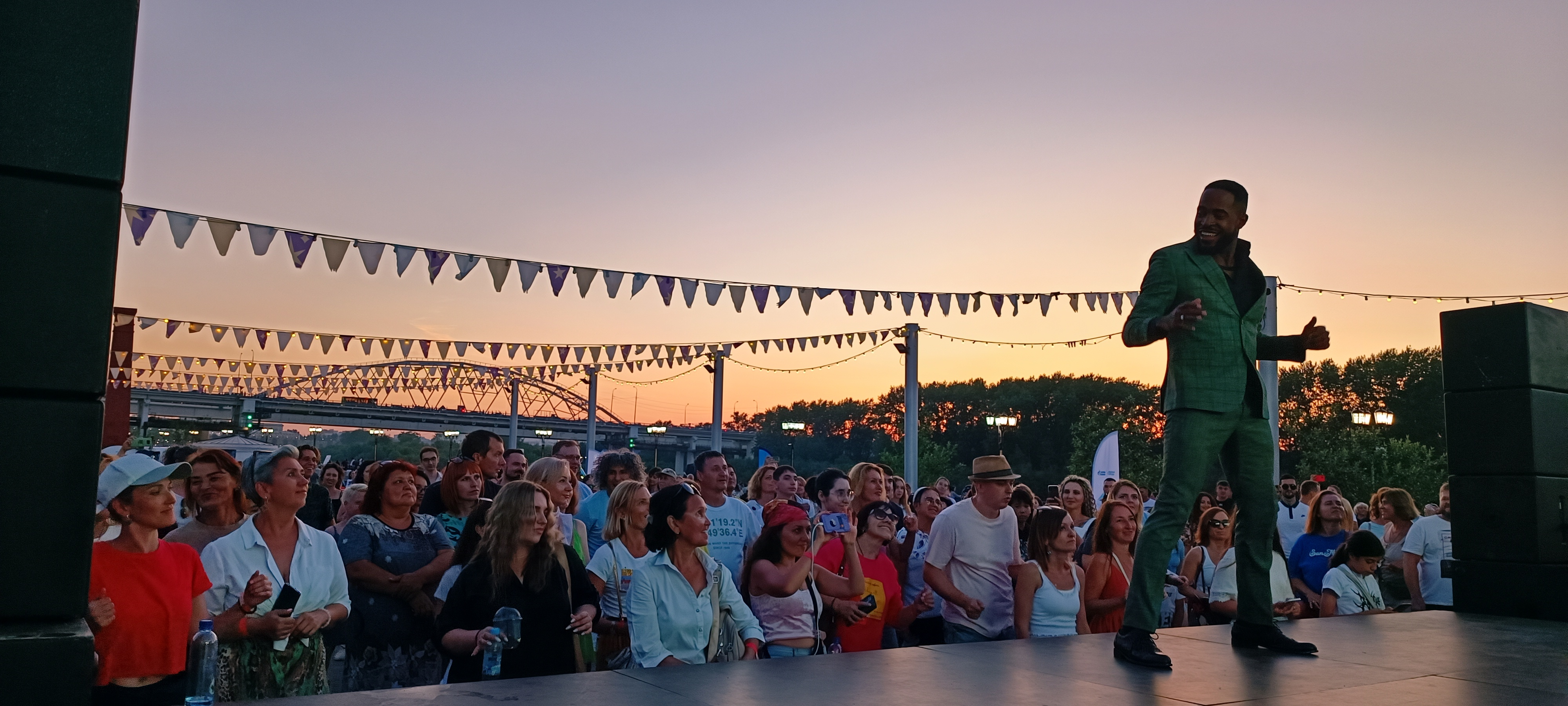
Cuban dance festival in Tyumen

The town has its own philharmonic orchestra and the Tyumen Music hall hosts performances.

=== Sports ===
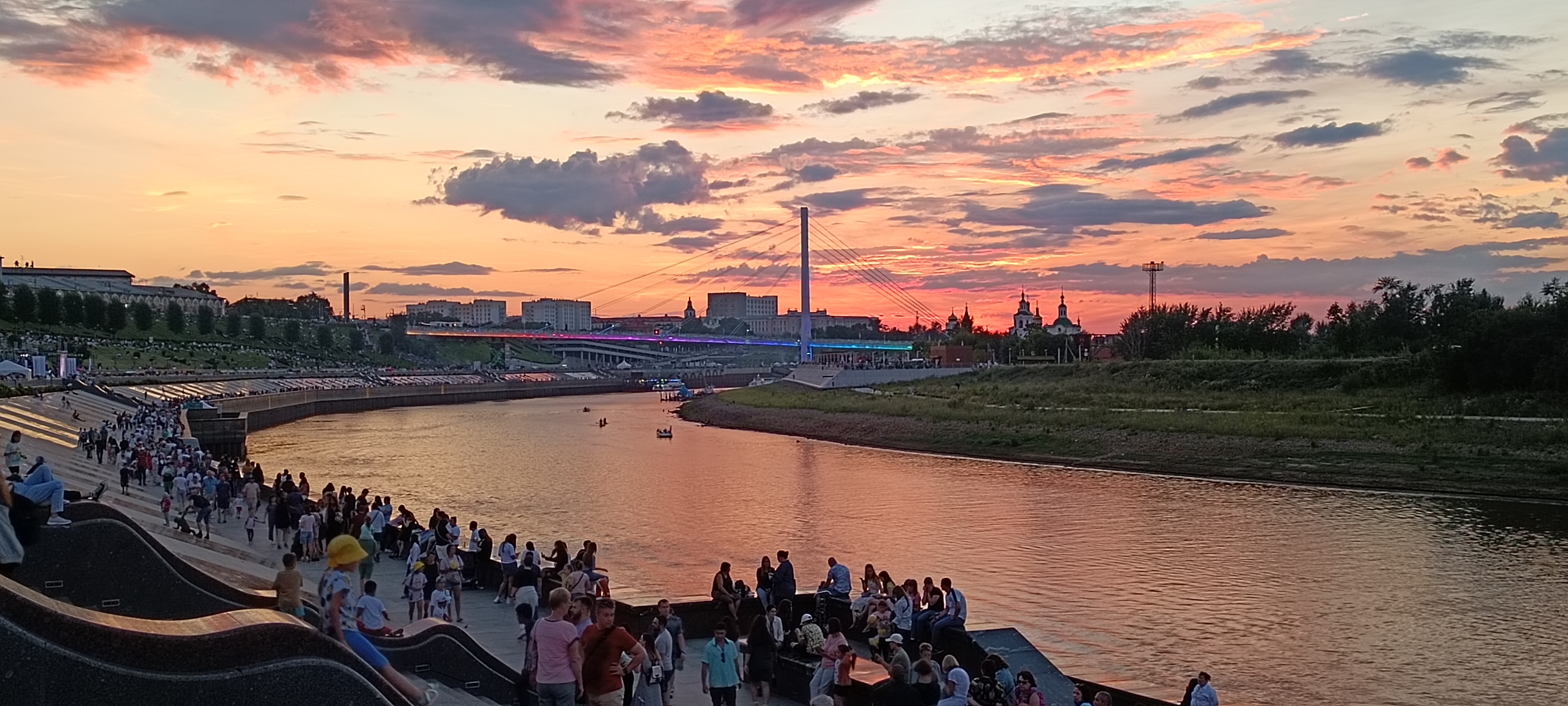
The crowd on the Tura embankment

Many Soviet and Russian sportsmen started their careers in Tyumen youth sport, including Soviet cyclists Sergey Uslamin, Yury Korotkikh, and Oleg Polovnikov

Tyumen has a national level ice hockey team, soccer team and futsal team.

Important ice hockey and soccer teams are:

- Rubin Tyumen
- Tyumensky Legion
- FC Tyumen

== Education ==
=== Higher education ===
In 1964, Tyumen Industrial Institute was founded to supply the oil industry with a qualified local workforce. Most students are not counted in the city population since they are non-residents of the Tyumen city according to Russian law.

=== Libraries ===
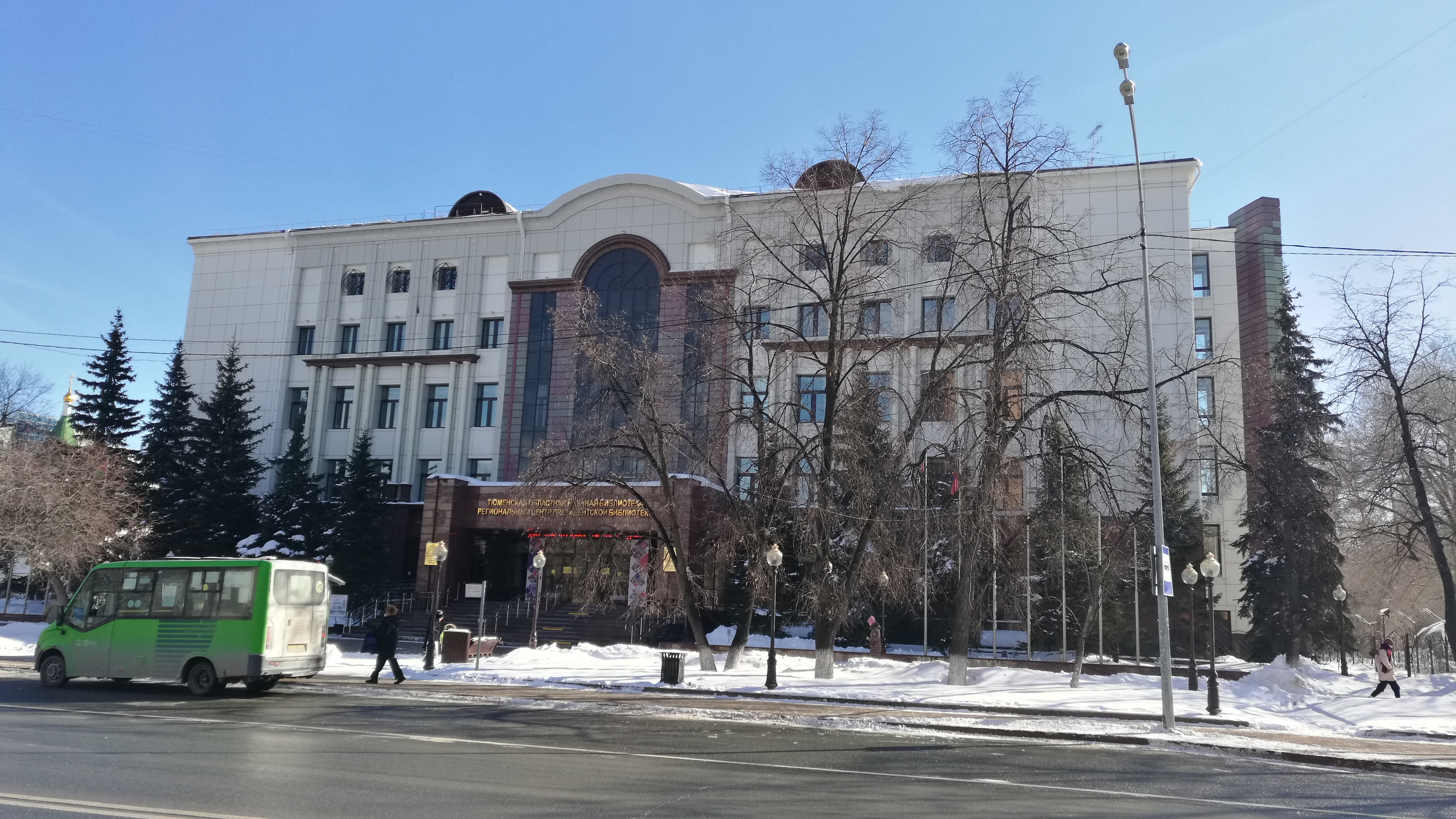
Tyumen Scientific Library

There are about fifty public libraries in Tyumen.

== Twin towns and sister cities ==
Tyumen is twinned with:

- Brest, Belarus (1999)
- Celle, Germany (1994) (resting)
- Daqing, China (1993)
- Houston, United States (1995) (suspended)

== Notable people ==
=== Natives of Tyumen ===
- Yevgeni Bushmanov, association football player and coach
- Yuri Aleksandrovich Gulyayev, opera singer
- Vladislav Krapivin, children's books writer
- Boris Krasin, composer
- Tamara Toumanova, ballerina and actress
- Anastasiya Kuzmina, Olympic biathlete
- Viktor Leonenko, association football player
- Alexander Zhuravlyov, Russian general
- Vladilen Mashkovtsev, writer
- Nikolay Pereverzev, futsal player
- Abraham Walkowitz, painter
- Ksenia Sukhinova, Miss World 2008
- Andrei Vasilevskiy, professional hockey player
- Anton Shipulin, Olympic biathlete
- Alena Shishkova, Russian model

=== Other ===
- Irving Berlin (1888–1989), composer whose family was from Tolochin, born in Tyumen
- Nikolai Chukmaldin (1836–1901), merchant and enlightener
- Georg Wilhelm Steller (1709–1746), German naturalist and explorer

== See also ==
- Chimgi-Tura
