= Sochi Airport railway station =

Railway station in Sochi, Russia

Sochi Airport Аэропорт Сочи
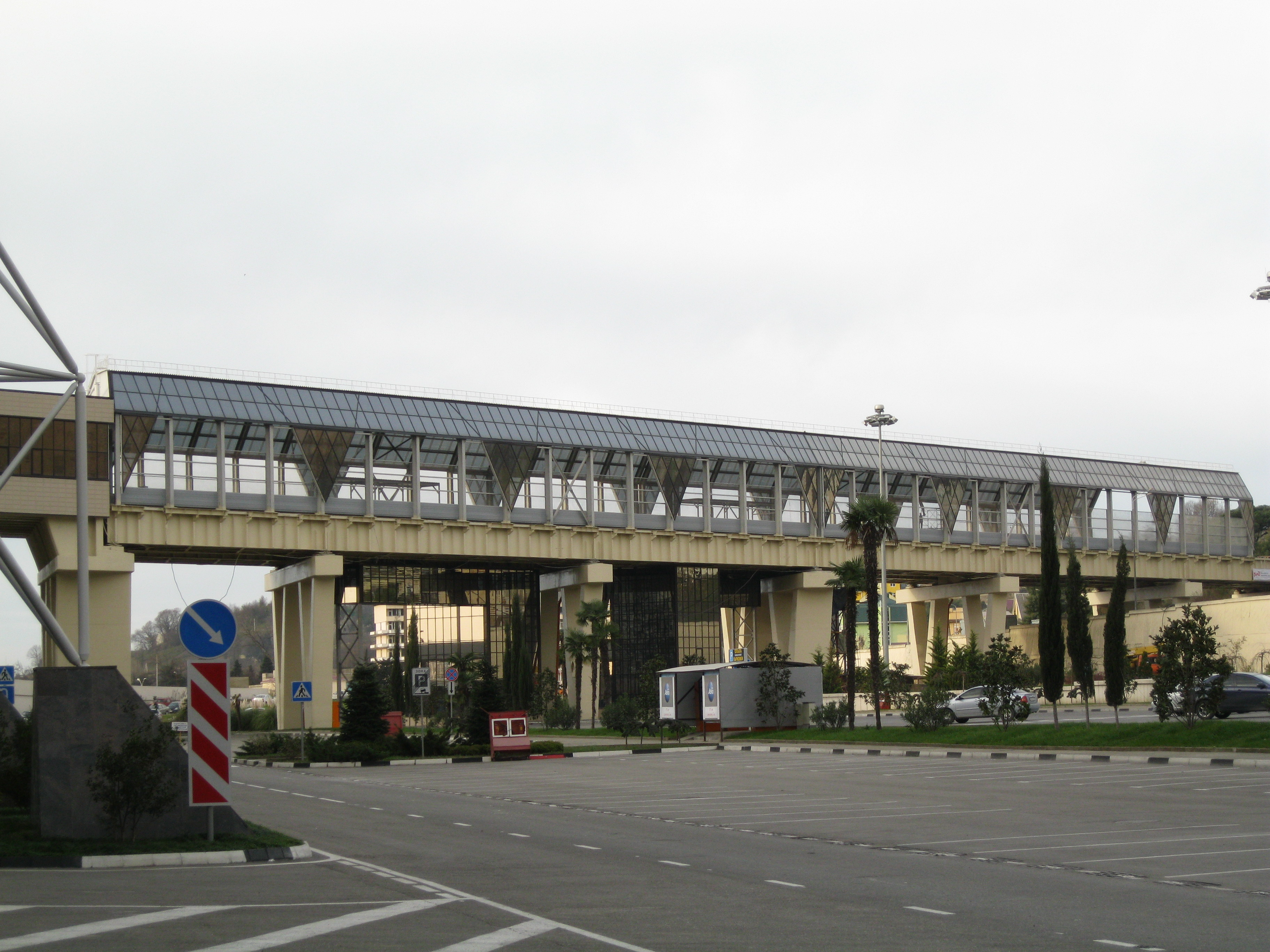
- View to the station from the street.

General information
- Location: Adler District, Sochi; Russia
- Coordinates: 43.448615°N 39.938399°E
- Owner: Russian Railways
- Operator: North Caucasus Railway
- Distance: 2,8 km (to Adler)
- Platforms: 1
- Tracks: 2

Construction
- Structure type: Elevated
- Parking: Yes
- Cycle facilities: Yes

History
- Opened: 27 January 2012; 14 years ago

Services
Preceding station	Russian Railways	Following station
Adler Terminus	Sochi Airport branch	Terminus
Location

Sochi Airport (Russian: Станция Аэропорт Сочи) is a railway station in Sochi, Russia. It is located next to the Sochi International Airport in Adler District of Sochi. There is a direct walking bridge from the platform to the airport building.

== History ==
The construction of the station began in 2009. The station has 3 lifts and escalators.

The grand opening was held on 27 January 2012.

== Trains ==
- Sochi – Airport Sochi (every 15 minutes)
- Tuapse – Airport Sochi (2 trains a day)
