= Adler railway station =

Railway station in Sochi, Russia

Adler Адлер
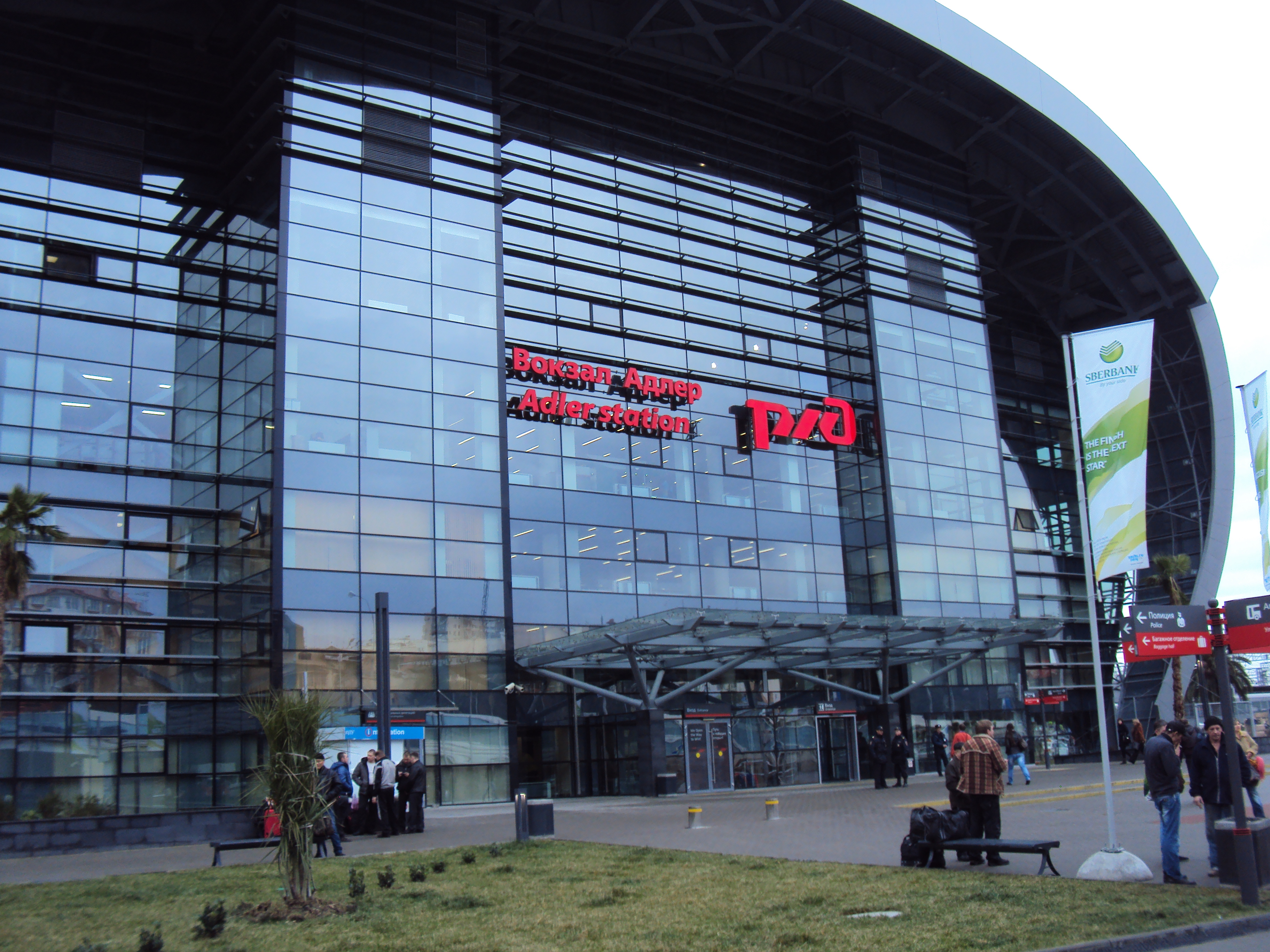
- View of the station from the street.

General information
- Location: Adler District, Sochi; Russia
- Coordinates: 43°26′51″N 39°54′17″E
- Owner: Russian Railways
- Operator: North Caucasus Railway
- Platforms: 5 (4 island platforms)
- Tracks: 16

Construction
- Structure type: At-grade
- Parking: Yes

Other information
- Station code: 532805

History
- Opened: 28 October 2013; 12 years ago

Services
Preceding station	Russian Railways	Following station
Izvestiya towards Krivenkovskaya	Krivenkovskaya–Vesioloye	Olympic Village towards Vesyoloye
Terminus	Adler–Roza Khutor	Olympic Village towards Roza Khutor
Terminus	Sochi Airport branch	Sochi Airport Terminus
Location

Adler railway station (Russian: Адлер) is a railway station in Adler District of Sochi. It is located on the North Caucasus Railway, a regional subsidiary of Russian Railways, and one of the largest rail passenger terminals in Russia.

== History ==
Construction of the new railway station began in November 2010 to replace the existing one, which is located to the west. It is a hall of 150 by 60 m, in two parts, one on the side of the sea, and one on the city side. There is a car park, and the roof features solar collectors, which are used for heating.

The new station has a capacity of 3000 to 5000 passengers per hour in normal operation and up to 20,000 passengers on the opening day of the 2014 Olympic Games. Construction was completed in 2013.

The station was opened on 28 October 2013 in the presence of Russian president Vladimir Putin and Thomas Bach, the chair of the International Olympic Committee.

== Trains ==
- Saratov – Adler
- St.Petersburg – Adler
- Nizhny Novgorod – Adler
- Moscow – Adler
- Krasnoyarsk – Adler
- Novosibirsk – Adler
- Minsk – Adler
- Vorkuta – Adler
- Yekaterinburg – Adler
- Chelyabinsk – Adler
- Perm – Adler
- Kaliningrad – Adler
- Gomel – Adler
- Rostov-on-Don – Adler
- Kislovodsk – Adler
- Vladikavkaz – Adler
- Krasnodar – Adler (Lastochka)
- Maykop – Adler (Lastochka)
- Mineralnye Vody – Adler (Lastochka)

== Gallery ==
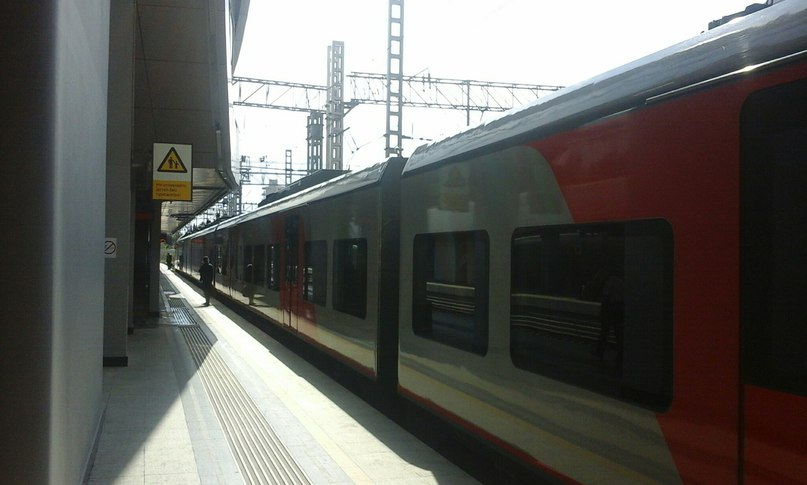
Express train Lastochka on platform 5.

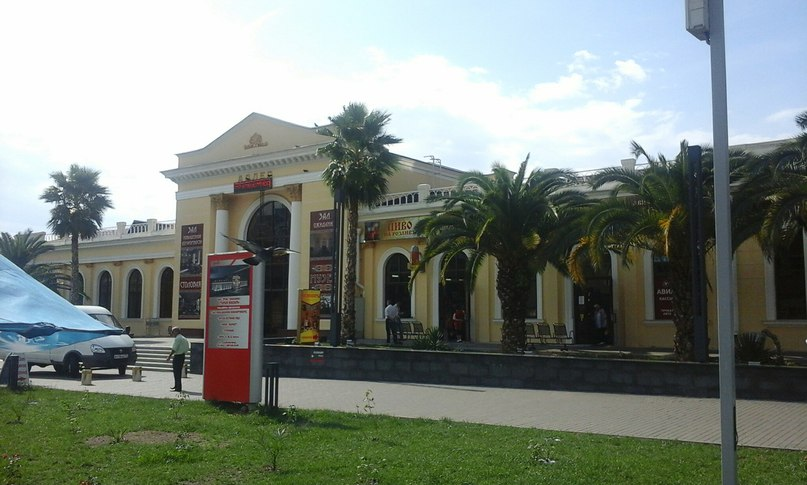
The old station building in October 2015.

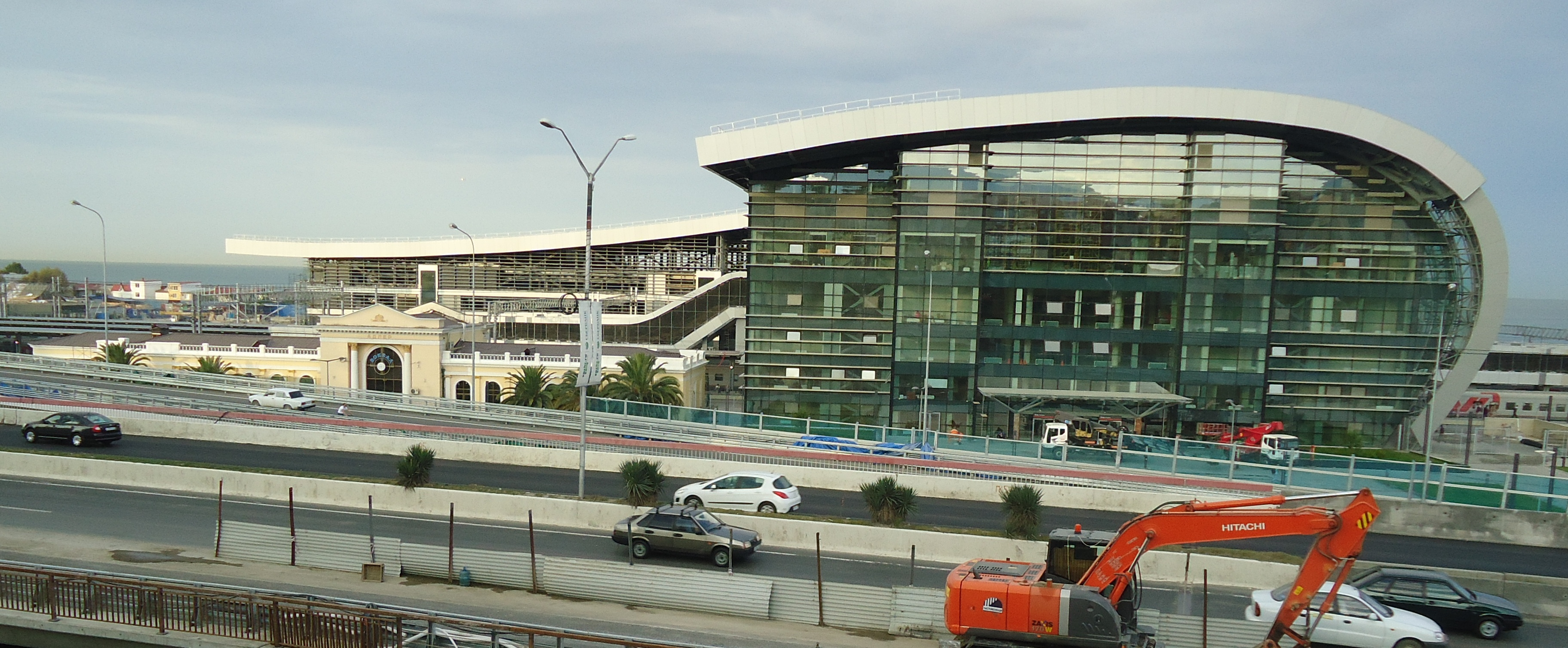
View of the station from the beach.

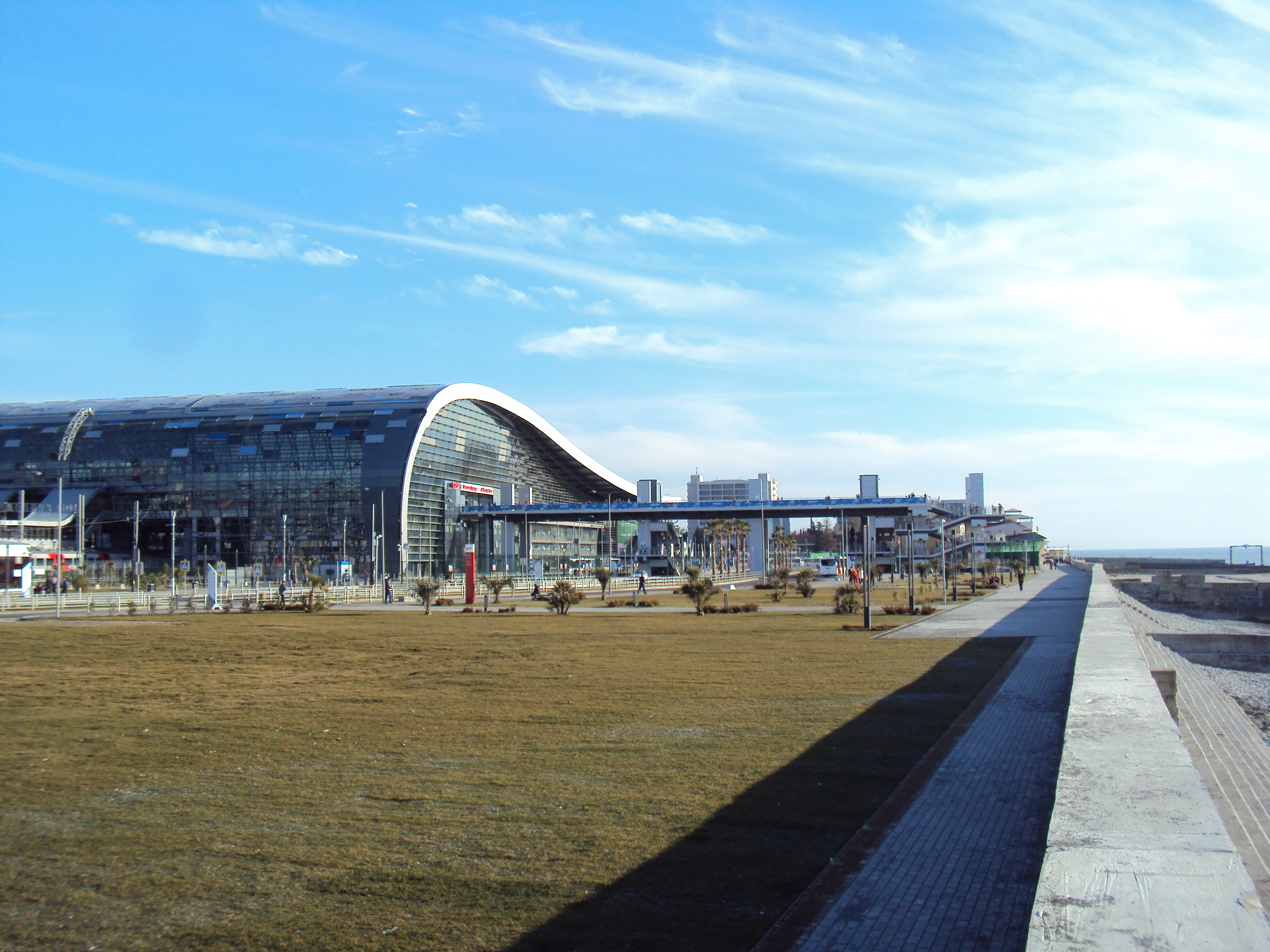
View of the station from the beach.

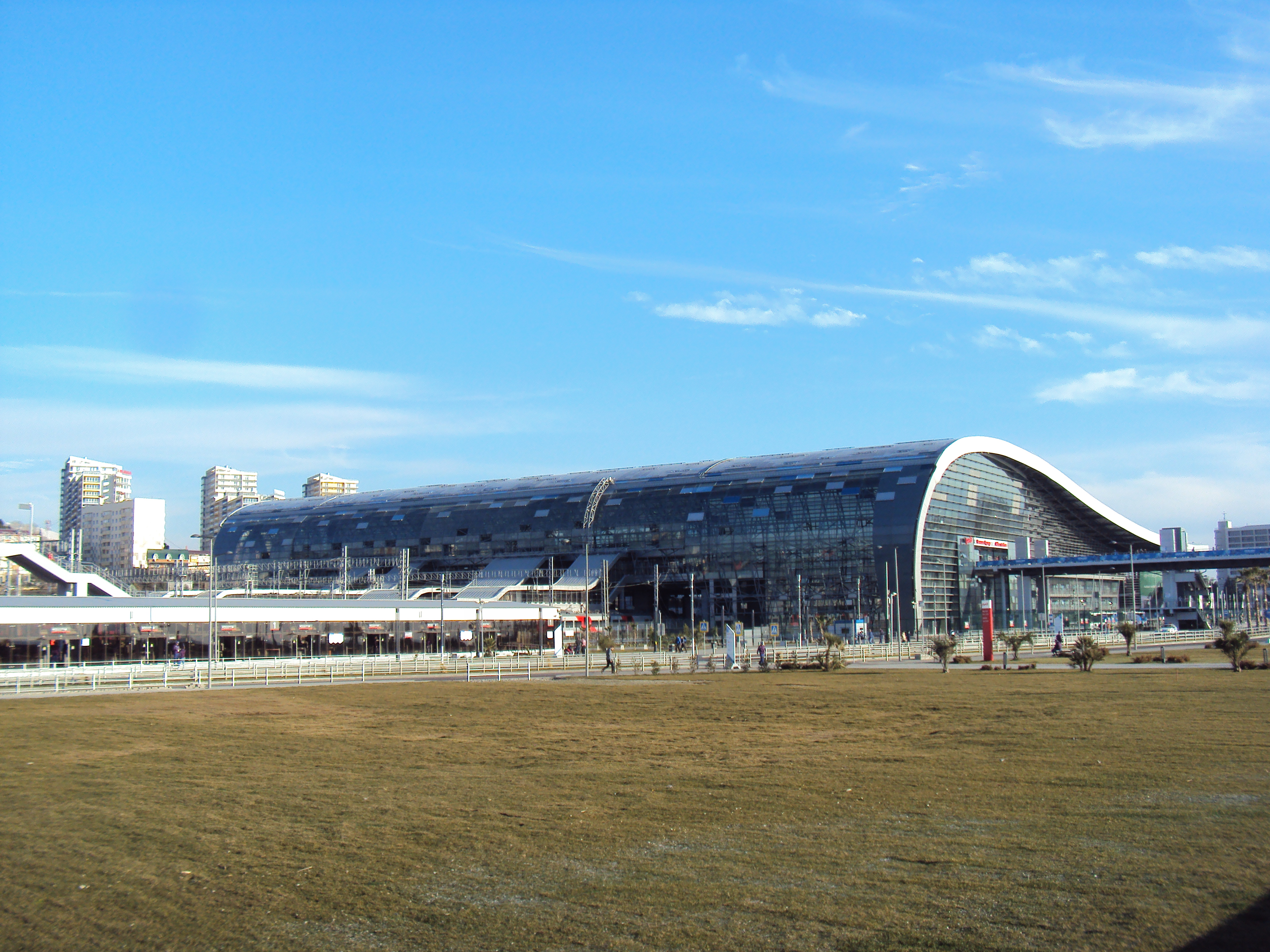
View of the station from the beach.

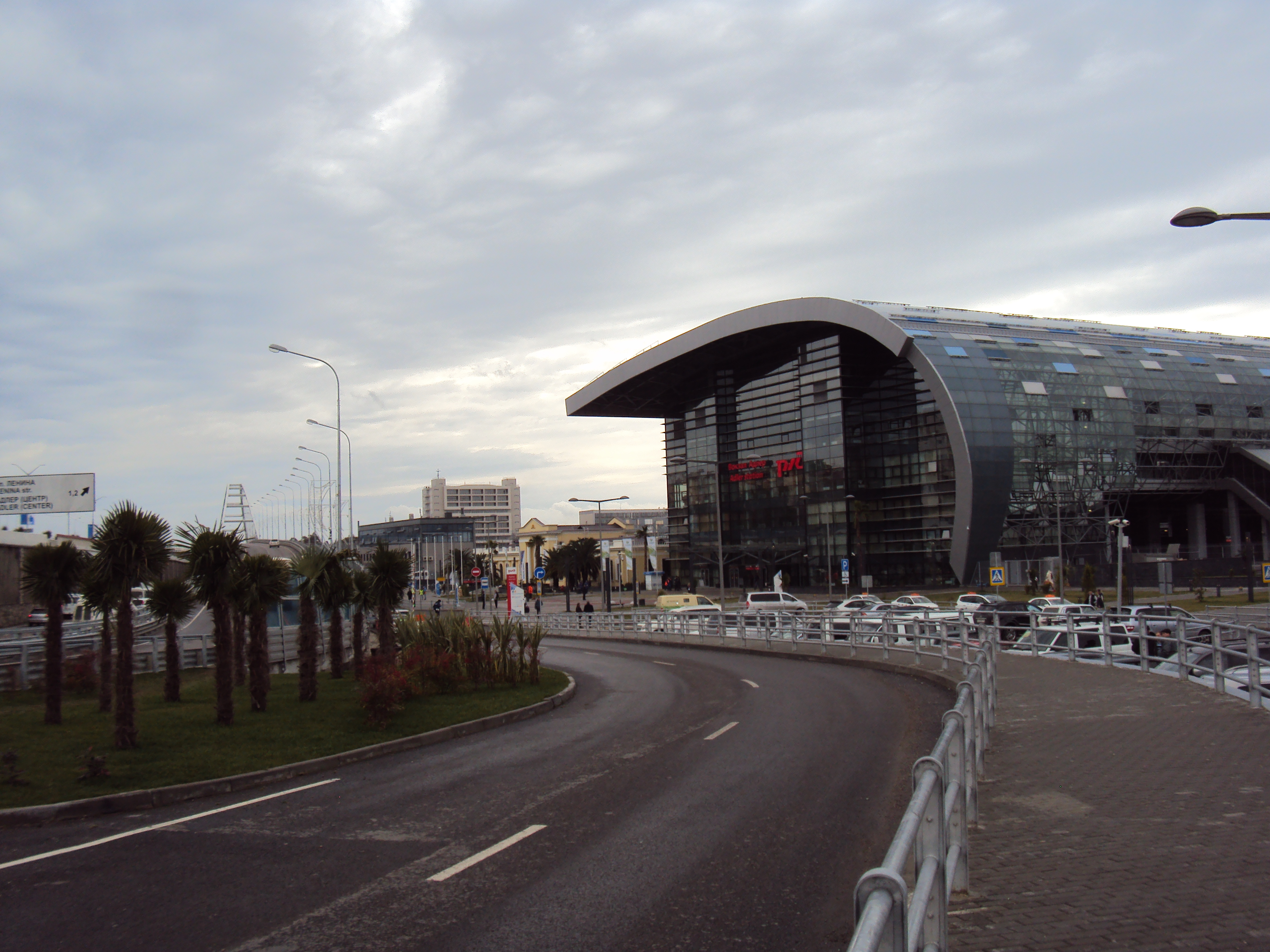
View of the station from Lenina street.
