= Matsesta =

Matsesta may refer to the following objects in Sochi:

- Matsesta Microdistrict
- Matsesta railway station
- Matsesta (river)
