= Adlersky city district =

Adlersky city district Адлерский внутригородской район (Russian)
- District
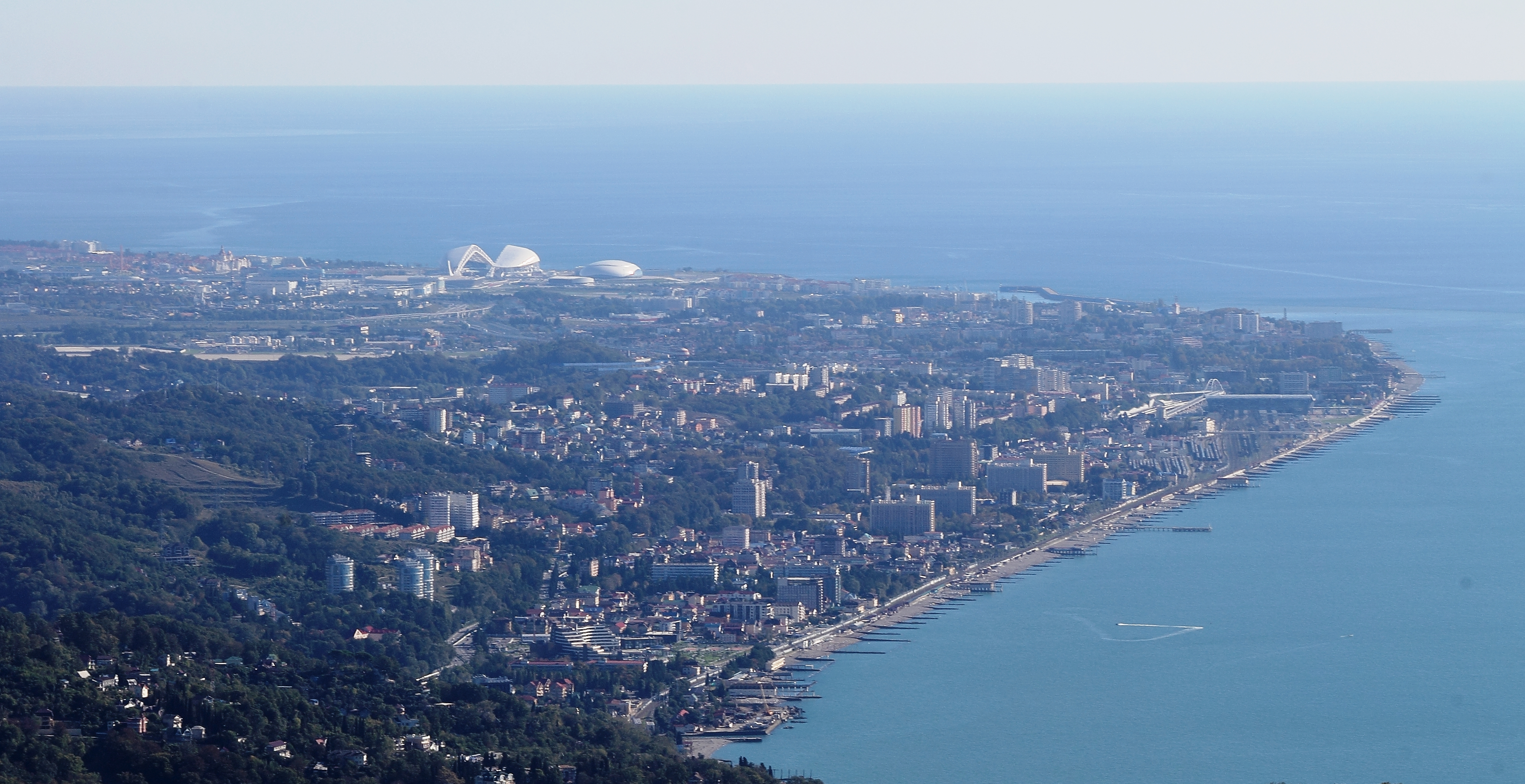
- The coastal resort of Adler as seen from the Mount Akhun, 9 kilometres (5.6 mi) to the northwest

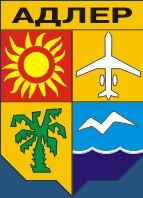
- Coat of arms
- Adlersky city district in Sochi
- Coordinates: 43°26′01″N 39°54′58″E
- Country: Russia
- Federal subject: Krasnodar Krai
- City: Sochi
- Established: 10 February 1961
- Administrative center: Adler Microdistrict

Area
  - Total: 1,352 km^{2} (522 sq mi)

Population (2010 Census)
  - Total: 76,534
  - Density: 56.61/km^{2} (146.6/sq mi)

Administrative structure
  - Administrative divisions: 1 settlement okrugs, 3 rural okrugs
  - Inhabited localities in jurisdiction: 1 urban-type settlements, 29 rural localities

Adlersky city district (Russian: Адлерский район) is the southernmost of four city districts of the city of Sochi in Krasnodar Krai, Russia, lying along the Black Sea coast near the southern Russian border with Georgia. The city district borders Maykopsky District of Adygea in the north, Mostovsky District of Krasnodar Krai in the east, Abkhazia in the south, and Khostinsky city district in the northwest. In the southwest, it is bordered by the Black Sea. Population: 76,534 (2010 census); 69,120 (2002 census); 68,827 (1989 Soviet census). Adlersky District was chosen to host the 2014 Winter Olympics. The historical center of the district is Adler (Адлер) – formerly classified as a town, but today a residential district of Adlersky city district.

== History ==
In 2019, an area in Imereti Lowlands was cut out from Adlersky city district and incorporated separately as the urban-type settlement of Sirius. It was later designated as a federal territory.

== Transportation ==
Adler is home to the Sochi International Airport, which serves the whole Greater Sochi area.

Adler railway station is also the effective southern terminus of the Russian section of the North Caucasus Railway, which has ceased to carry international traffic to Georgia since hostilities between Russia and Georgia closed the cross-border line in 1992. The summer months see direct train services bringing visitors to Adler from as far away as Berlin in the west (a journey of 3,714 km), Vorkuta in the north (4,286 km away, beyond the Arctic Circle), and Khabarovsk in the Russian Far East, with the 9,816 km of the latter journey taking eight days to complete. Passenger service to Sukhumi starts and stops from time to time.

For the 2014 Winter Olympics, new suburban network was put in operation. There is infrequent suburban service to Sochi, with most of the trains stopping also in Khosta and Matsesta, both in Khostinsky city district. The service continues in the direction of Abkhazian border, where trains stop at Olympiyskaya Derevnya railway platform. The service terminates at Olympiysky Park train station. Both the station and the platform were constructed for the Olympics. Furthermore, a connection to the airport is open, with service to Sochi through Adler railway station. Finally, a new line was constructed between Adler and Krasnaya Polyana, where some of the Olympic competitions were held, with two railway stations, Esto-Sadok and Roza Khutor. Kudepsta railway platform has been disused. Vesyoloye railway station is only in operation when there is passenger traffic to Abkhazia; at this station, customs and border controls take place.

Buses connect Adler with other localities of the city of Sochi.

== Landmarks ==
The district covers an area of 1,352 square kilometers (522 sq mi) and has under its jurisdiction a network of mountain auls, the Estonian colony at Estosadok, and the ski resort of Krasnaya Polyana which hosted the snow events (alpine and Nordic) of the 2014 Winter Olympics and 2014 Winter Paralympics. The Fisht Olympic Stadium and associated facilities are located closer to the shore.

The landmarks of the former town of Adler include two Russian Orthodox churches, dedicated to the Holy Trinity and the Holy Ghost, as well as the Armenian Saint Sarkis Cathedral. Apart from a pebbly and narrow beach backed by the railway line, the district also has a municipal historical museum and a dolphinarium. It is also possible to visit a trout farm (founded in 1964) and a breeding nursery for great apes. It has a 70-metre-high Polikarya waterfall and the Akhshtyr Gorge with a 160-meter-long cave which contains traces of human habitation.
