= Khostinsky city district =

Khostinsky city district Хостинский внутригородской район (Russian)
- District
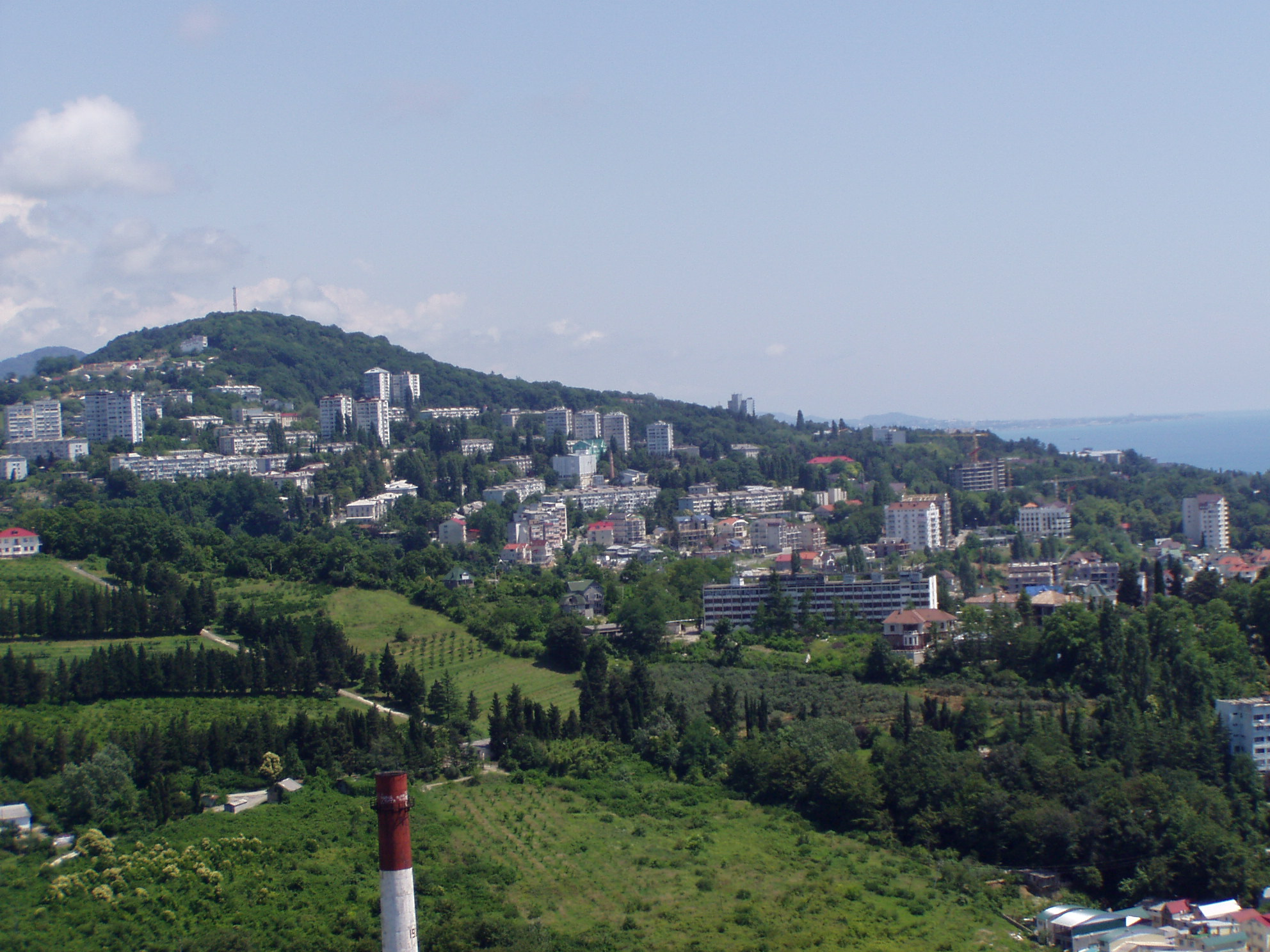
- Panorama of Bytkha
- Khostinsky city district in Sochi
- Coordinates: 43°36′N 39°48′E
- Country: Russia
- Federal subject: Krasnodar Krai
- City: Sochi
- Established: April 18, 1951

Population (2010 Census)
  - Total: 65,229

Administrative structure
  - Administrative divisions: 2 Rural okrugs
  - Inhabited localities in jurisdiction: 11 rural localities

Khostinsky city district (Russian: Хостинский райо́н) is one of four city districts of the city of Sochi in Krasnodar Krai, Russia. The city district borders Maykopsky District of the Republic of Adygea in the northeast, Adlersky city district in the southeast, Tsentralny city district in the west, and Lazarevsky city district in the northwest. In the southwest, it is bordered by the Black Sea. Population: 65,229 (2010 census); 62,515 (2002 census); 65,713 (1989 Soviet census).

== Geography ==
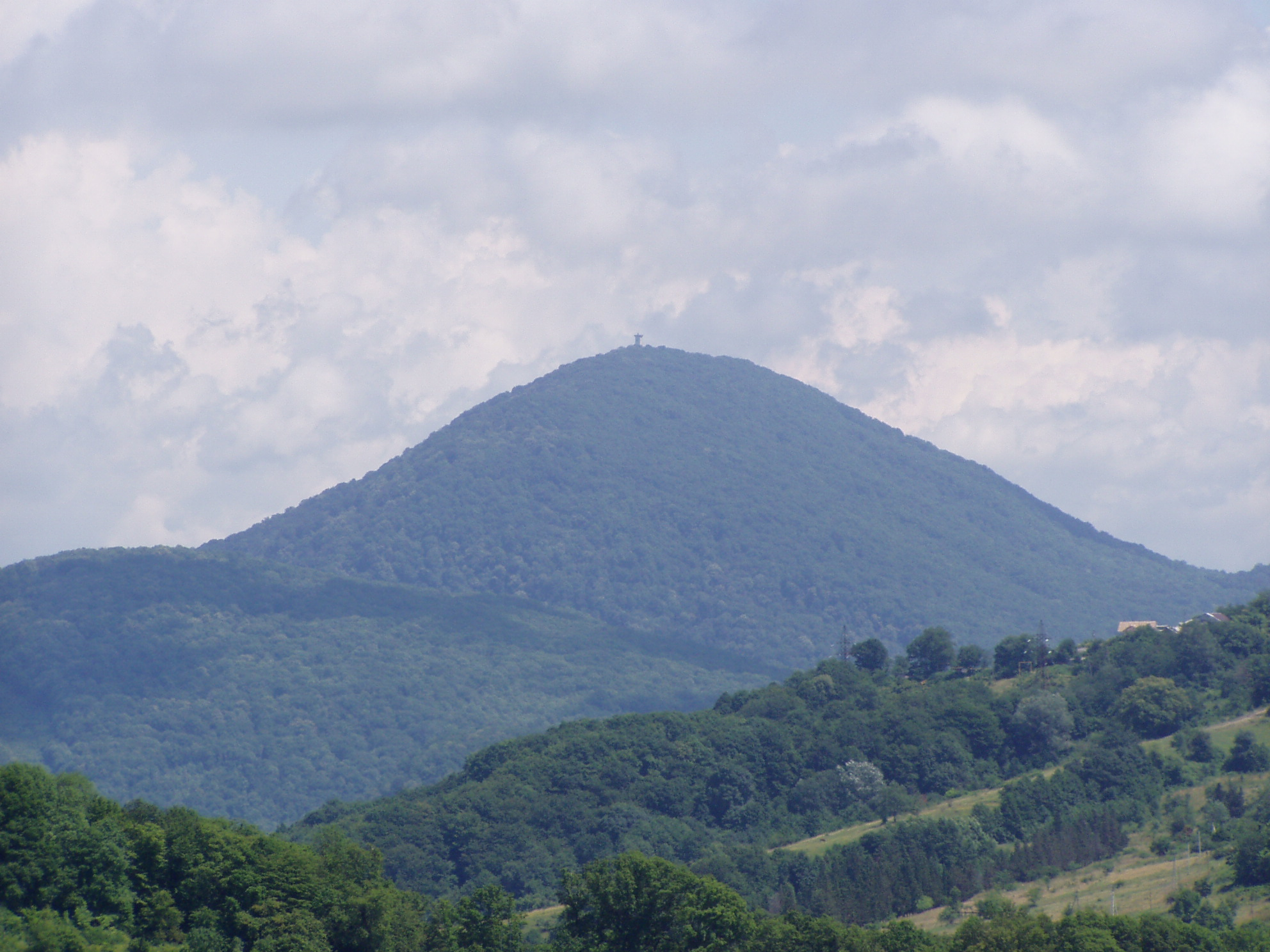
The Akhun Mountain

The district is located on the slopes of the Western Caucasus, which descend to the Black Sea. The coast within the district runs from northwest to southeast. The majority of the population in the districts lives at or close to the seashore, in former settlements later turned microdistricts. The biggest of them are (northwest to southeast) Svetlana, Bytha, Iskra, Matsesta, Maly Akhun, Khosta, and Kudepsta. Svetlana is essentially a suburb of the center of Sochi, and Kudepsta is separated from Adlersky city district by the Kudepsta River. Further inland, there are mountains, separated by river valleys. The biggest rivers in the district are the Shakhe River, the Sochi River, the Khosta River, and the Matsesta River. The northeastern part of the district belongs to the Caucasus Zapovednik, a protected area spanning parts of Krasnodar Krai and Adygea. Much of the remaining area of the district, except for the coastal area, belongs to Sochi National Park. It includes the Orekhovsky waterfall.

The city district includes two rural okrugs, Baranovsky rural okrug with the center in the selo of Baranovka, and Razdolsky rural okrug, with the center in Razdolnoye.

== History ==
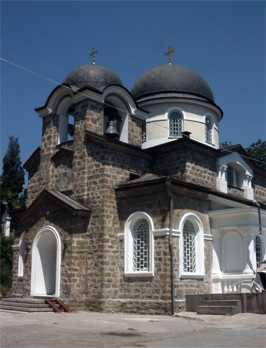
The Transfiguration Church in Khosta

The eastern shore of the Black Sea was populated from the antiquity, often changing allegiance. In the Middle Ages, the Republic of Genoa established a colony (Costa) at the location of modern Khosta. Eventually the area was taken by the Ottoman Empire, and after the Russo-Turkish War of 1828–29 was occupied by the Russian Empire. The native population, the Ubykh, were forcibly resettled in the 1860s. The area remained underdeveloped, and only in 1866 Black Sea okrug with the administrative center in Novorossiysk was established to administer the area. Since 1870, it was subdivided into three parts, one of which was administered from Dakhovsky, currently the center of Sochi. In 1888, Black Sea okrug was merged into Kuban Oblast. In 1896, it was transformed into Black Sea Governorate with the center in Novorossiysk. The area was a part of Sochi okrug.

Soviet Power was declared in Sochi in February 1918, followed by the advance of the army of the Democratic Republic of Georgia, which in July 1918 occupied the whole coast up to Tuapse. In February 1919, they were driven back by the Volunteer Army under command of Anton Denikin. Between January and May 1920, the Red Army recaptured the area.

In March 1918, Black Sea Governorate was abolished, an after the end of the Civil War ended up as Black Sea okrug of Kuban-Black Sea Oblast. On June 30, 1920, the okrug was split into divisions, and the area was included into Tuapse Division. On May 18, 1922 the divisions were abolished, and on January 26, 1923 the okrug was subdivided into five districts. The area was included into Sochinsky District with the administrative center in Sochi. On June 2, 1924 Kuban-Black Sea Oblast was abolished, and Black Sea okrug was included into South-Eastern Oblast. That was abolished on October 16, 1924, and the district was transferred to newly established North Caucasus Krai. In July 1930, okrugs were abolished, and Sochinsky District was directly subordinated to the krai.

What is now the area of the district developed in the 19th century as a collection of independent settlements. Khosta was granted a town status in 1899 and by 1914 had a population of 1,500 inhabitants, a brick factory, and a wine production plant. Matsesta developed as a sulphur bath resort. In particular, Joseph Stalin had a house in Matsesta, which currently functions as a museum. In 1933, it was decided to totally reconstruct the coastal area and to create a large number of spa resorts. To this end, in October 1934 the center of Sochinsky District was transferred to Adler, and Sochinsky District was renamed Adlersky. Khosta, Matsesta, and the large part of the current area of the district were subordinated to the city of Sochi.

On January 10, 1934 Azov-Black Sea Krai split off North Caucasus Krai. On September 13, 1937 it was abolished and split into Krasnodar Krai and Rostov Oblast. Sochi was transferred to Krasnodar Krai. On August 27, 1948 Sochi was made a city of krai significance. In the 1950s intensive construction works were carried out in Khosta. On April 18, 1951, Khostinsky city district was established. In 1961, the area of the district expanded.

== Economy ==
The district, likewise other parts of Sochi, mostly serves as holiday destination. Matsesta has sulphur baths known to Europeans since the middle of the 19th century, and functioned as a resort since 1902. Khostinsky city district hosts the major part of the couple of dozens resorts in the limits of the city of Sochi.

=== Transportation ===
The railway which connects Adler and Sochi follows the coast. There are two stations within the district, Khosta and Matsesta, both served by suburban trains from Sochi and from Krasnaya Polyana. Long-distance trains do not stop within the district. Akhun railway platform is disused.

The M27 Highway connecting Novorossiysk with Adler crosses the district. The highway serves as the bypass road for the center of Sochi, and it joins the coast next to Matsesta. South of Matsesta, it follows the coast. There are roads up to the valleys of most of the rivers including the Khosta and the Matsesta, but there are no roads crossing from valley to valley, or across the ridge to Adygea. The western part of the district is a part of the road network of the center of Sochi.

== Culture and recreation ==
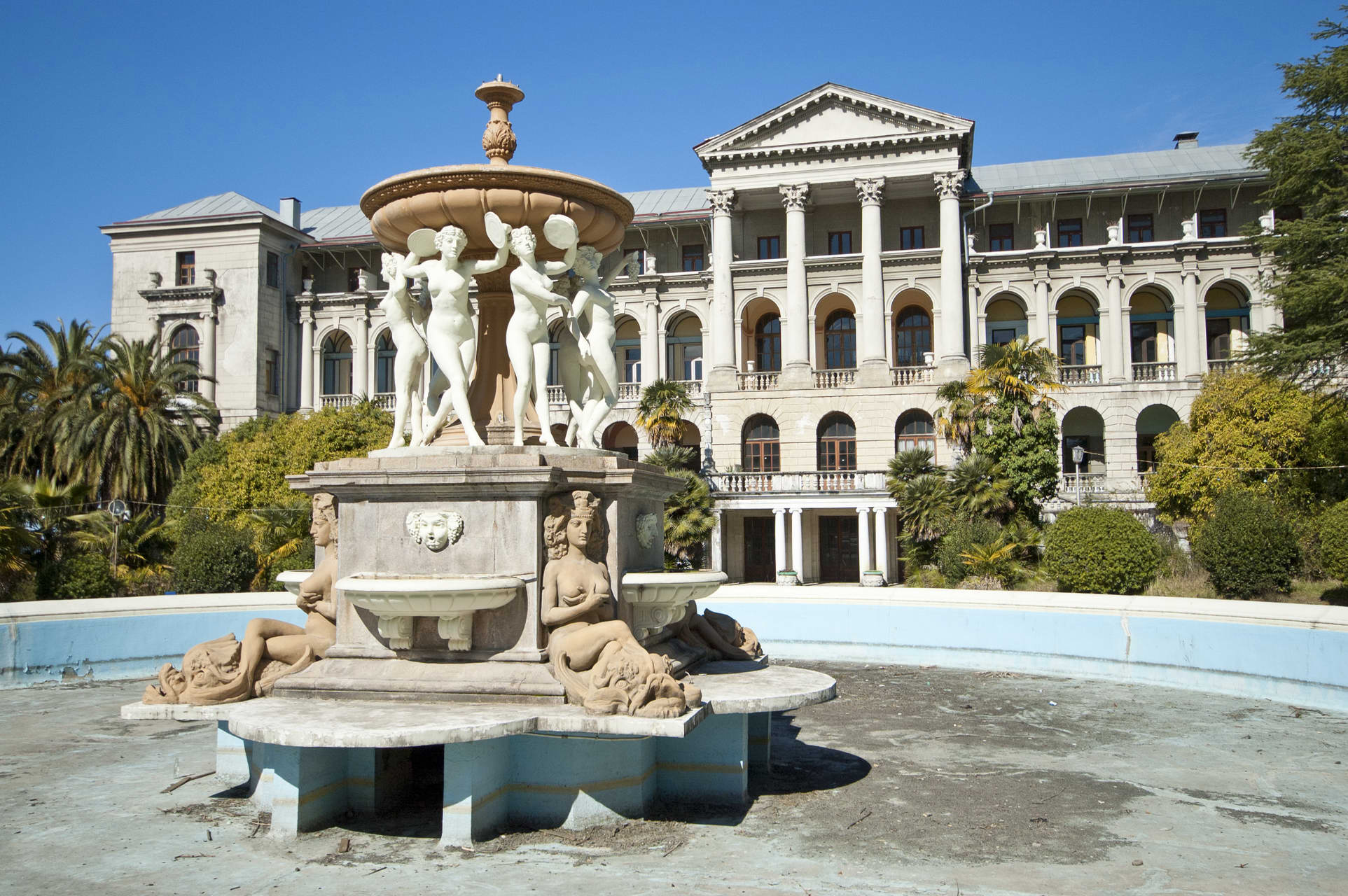
Ordzhonikidze Sanatorium in Bytha

- The Sochi Arboretum, which goes back to 1889, is located in Svetlana and possesses the most comprehensive collection of subtropical flora in Russia, including 76 species of pine, 80 species of oak, and 24 species of palm.
- Matsesta has been a spa since 1902. A 1,316-meter (4,318 ft) long tunnel, constructed between 1996 and 2000, connects it to Kurortny Avenue, a street running along the coast between Khosta and Sochi proper. The area does not retain many marks of antiquity, although the eponymous river was noted as Masaitica as early as 137 CE, in a letter from Arrian to Emperor Hadrian.
- Khosta is an old village, attested in medieval documents as Casto and Khamysh. It contains the ruins of a medieval church, and the comparatively modern Transfiguration Church, consecrated in 1914. Khosta has an array of tourist attractions:
  - Khosta Fortress, or rather the ruins thereof, perched on the top of a cliff within six kilometers (3.7 miles) from the sea coast.
  - The fortress stands on the grounds of an ancient grove of yews and boxwood. The grove covers an area of 301 ha and has been affiliated with the Caucasus Zapovednik since 1931 and is the World Heritage Site as a part of the Zapovednik.
  - The Akhun massif comprises Greater Akhun Mtn. (663 m), Lesser Akhun Mtn. (501 m), and Eagle Bluff (380 m). Greater Akhun is crowned by a Neo-Romanesque limestone tower (1936). There is also a chain of karst caves in the massif.
- Kudepsta, at the border with Adler, is another seashore resort, notable for the Vorontsov Caves, stretching for some 4 kilometers (2.5 mi) away from the shore.

== See also ==
- City districts of Sochi
