= Akhtsu Tunnel =

Tunnel in Sochi, Russia

- Interactive map of Akhtsu Tunnel

Overview
- Location: Sochi, Russia
- Coordinates: 43.6009°N 40.0386°E
- Status: open
- Start: Adler
- End: Krasnaya Polyana

Operation
- Work began: 1999
- Opened: 19 August 2005

Technical
- Length: 2,625.7 m (1.6315 mi)
- No. of lanes: 2
- Tunnel clearance: 5 m (16 ft)
- Width: 7 m (23 ft)

Akhtsu Tunnel (Russian: Тонне́ль Ахцу́) is a tunnel on the road between Adler and Krasnaya Polyana (motorway A148) in the Adlersky City District of Sochi, Russia. It goes through the mountain massive on the left bank of the Mzymta River, in the Akhtsu Gorge.

The length of the tunnel is 2625.7 m. The width is 7 m.

The tunnel was built between 1999 and 2005. It was opened on 19 August 2005 by Russian president Vladimir Putin.
