= Khosta =

Khosta may refer to the following objects in Sochi:

- Khosta Microdistrict
- Khosta railway station
- Khosta River
- 2S34 Khosta, a variant of the 2S1 Gvozdika
