= Matsesta Microdistrict =

Coordinates: 43°32′49.398″N 39°47′35.3502″E

Matsesta (Russian: Мацеста) is a microdistrict in Khostinsky City District in Sochi, Krasnodar Krai, Russia, primarily known as a spa and resort on the Black Sea coast. Matsesta is located in the mouth of the Matsesta River, halfway between the center of Sochi and Adler. Matsesta is located in the Matsesta River valley and consists of four parts. Novaya Matsesta (New Matsesta) is located at the coast, Srednyaya Matsesta (Middle Matsesta) is upstream the river, and Staraya Matsesta (Old Matsesta) is even further from the sea. Verkhnyaya Matsesta (Upper Matsesta) is located uphill from Srednyaya Matsesta.

== History ==
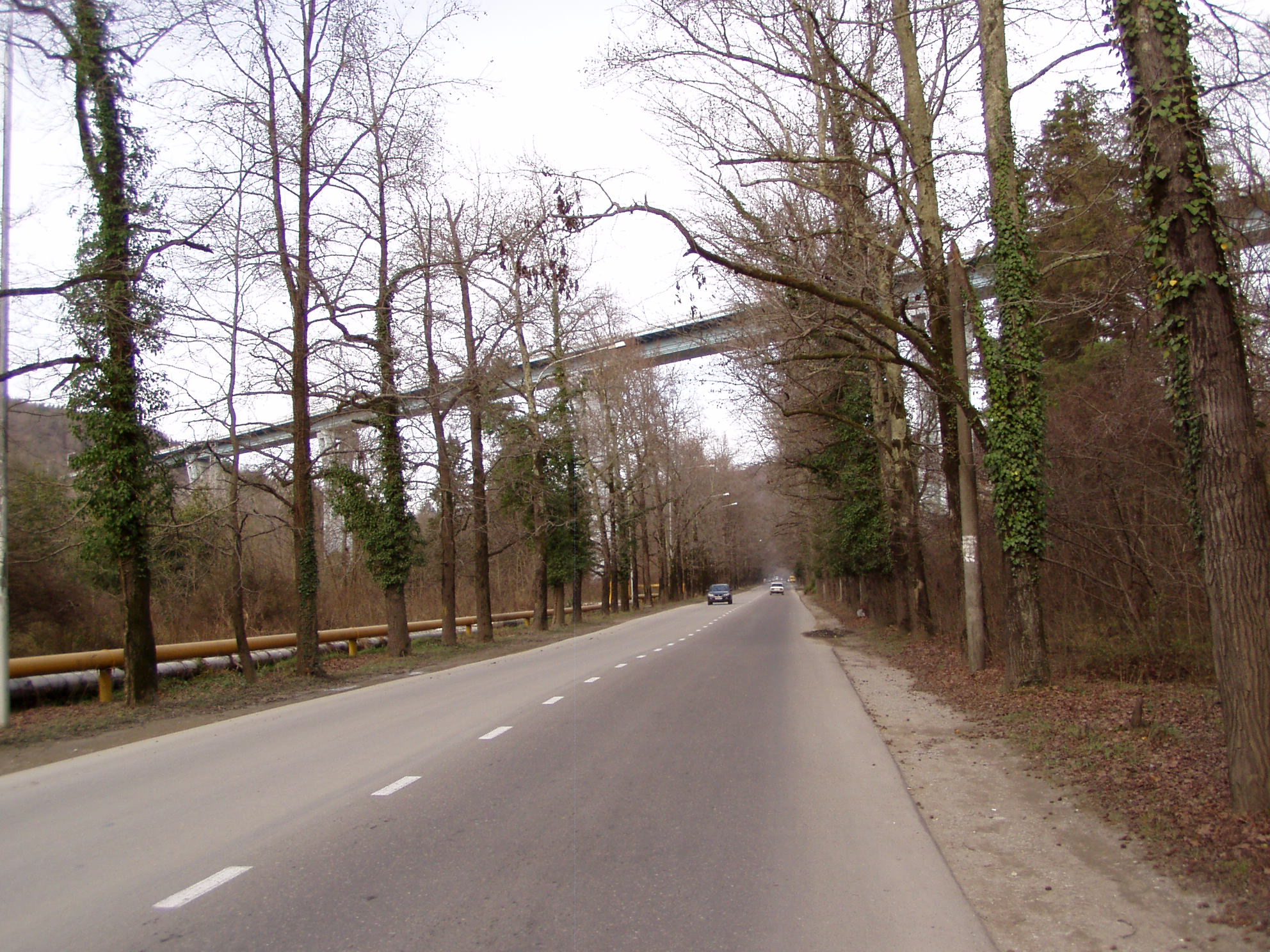
Cheltenham Alley, Matsesta

The sulphur springs in Matsesta were first mentioned in literature in 1841. It was repeatedly proposed to found a spa here, until in 1901 the decision was taken by the authorities. The spa was opened on September 15, 1902, and Matsesta developed as a settlement serving the sulfur baths. It developed as a resort in the 1900s. At the time, Matsesta belonged to Black Sea Governorate with the center in Novorossiysk.

Soviet Power was declared in Matsesta in February 1918, followed by the advance of the army of the Democratic Republic of Georgia, which in July 1918 occupied the whole coast up to Tuapse. In February 1919, they were driven back by the Volunteer Army under command of Anton Denikin. Between January and May 1920, the Red Army recaptured the area.

In 1933, it was decided to reconstruct the coastal area and to create a number of spa resorts. To this end, in October 1934 Matsesta was subordinated to the city of Sochi. Khostinsky City District was established in 1951. Joseph Stalin had a summer house (datcha) in Matsesta, where he typically spent summers.

== Economy ==
The economy of Matsesta is based on holiday tourism and on balneotherapy.

=== Transportation ===
The area is served by the Matsesta railway station. There is suburban service between Sochi railway station and Adler railway station.

The M27 Highway connecting Novorossiysk with Adler passes through Matsesta. The highway serves as the bypass road for the center of Sochi, and it joins the coast next to Matsesta. South of Matsesta, it follows the coast. There is also a road up the Matsesta River valley.

=== Culture and recreation ===
Matsesta hosts a part of all resorts in Sochi. Some of those have been built in the 1930s.

There is an aquarium in Novaya Matsesta.
