= Battle of Khosta =

1840 engagement in the Russo-Circassian War

- Part of Russo-Circassian War
Date	1840
Location	Khosta, Western Caucasus, near present-day Sochi, Russia
Result	Circassian victory

Belligerents
(Circassia) Circassian tribes	(Russia) Russian Empire

Commanders and leaders
Unknown (led by local tribal leaders)	Unknown

Strength
Unknown	3,000 soldiers

Casualties and losses
Unknown, but lower than Russian losses	2,000 killed

The Battle of Khosta (1840) was a major engagement in the Russo-Circassian War (1763–1864), fought between the Russian Empire and Circassian tribes near Khosta in the Western Caucasus. Despite being outnumbered, Circassian fighters ambushed a Russian force of approximately 3,000 troops, inflicting around 2,000 casualties. This victory highlighted the effectiveness of Circassian guerrilla tactics and temporarily stalled Russian expansion in the region, boosting local resistance efforts.

== Background ==
The Battle of Khosta occurred during the Russo-Circassian War (1763–1864), a protracted conflict between the Russian Empire and the indigenous Circassian population of the Caucasus. By the early 1840s, Russian forces intensified their campaigns to secure control over the Black Sea coastline and subjugate the Circassian tribes resisting Russian expansion. The Circassians, employing guerrilla tactics, leveraged the mountainous terrain to challenge the Russian advance.

== Battle ==
In 1840, Russian forces marched toward Khosta with approximately 3,000 troops, intending to establish control over the region and secure supply routes along the coast. The Circassians, who had become adept at using the challenging terrain to their advantage, launched a surprise ambush against the Russian columns near Khosta. The Circassians inflicted heavy losses on the Russians, who were unprepared for the intensity of the resistance and the strategic disadvantages posed by the mountainous landscape.

Russian casualties were reportedly around 2,000 killed, a considerable portion of their initial force. Circassian losses were not recorded in detail, but it is generally assumed they were significantly lower due to the Circassians’ familiarity with the terrain and their use of ambush tactics.

== Aftermath ==
The battle was a significant morale booster for the Circassians, demonstrating their capability to repel a larger and better-equipped Russian force. Although the Circassians faced an increasingly formidable Russian military machine, the Battle of Khosta underscored the difficulty Russia faced in subduing the region. The battle slowed Russian expansion temporarily and highlighted the effectiveness of Circassian guerrilla tactics, which would remain central to their resistance throughout the war.
