= Vorontsovka Caves =

Cave system in Krasnodar Krai, Russia

Vorontsovskaya Cave System
- Воронцовская система пещер
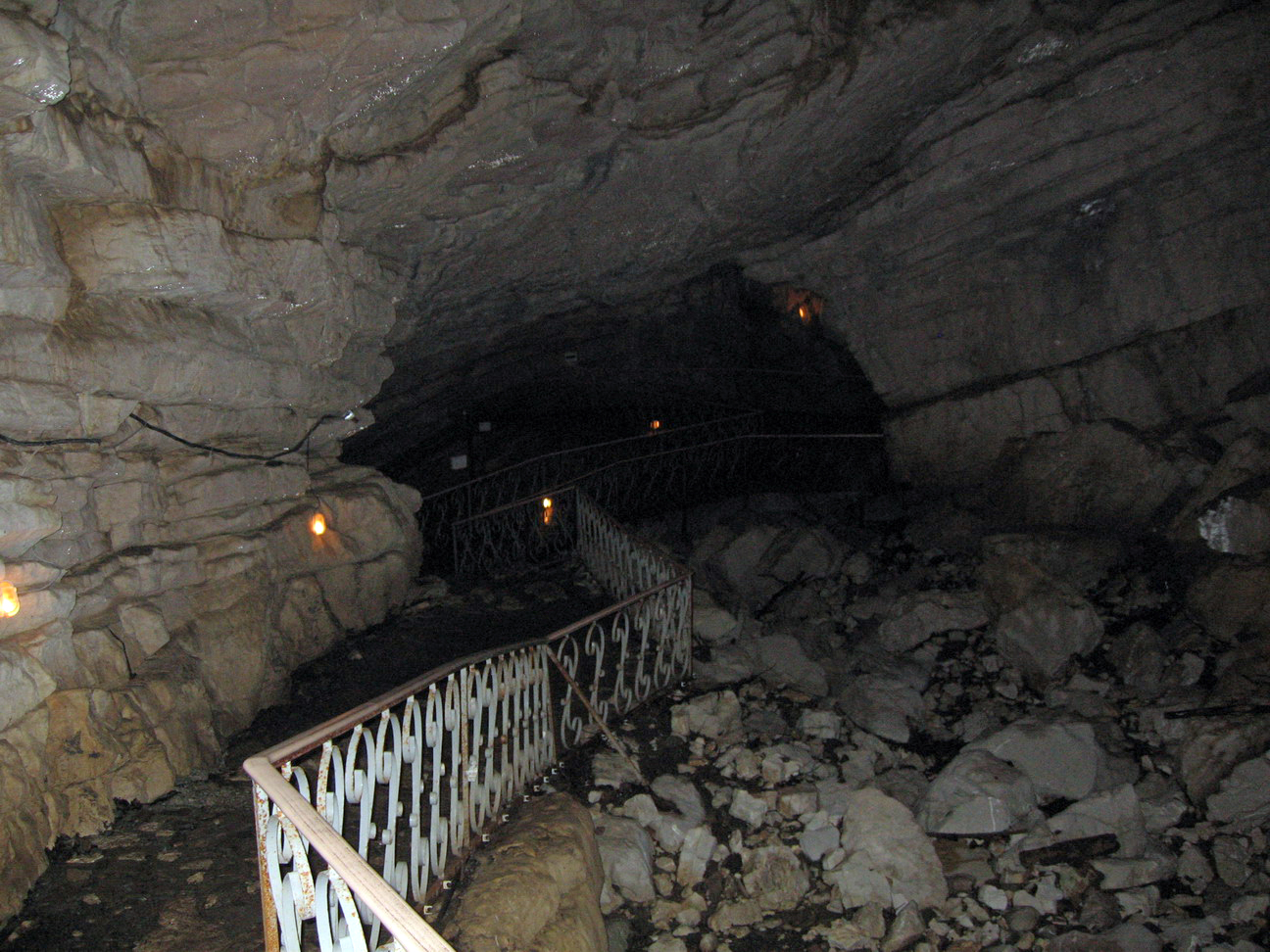
- One of the entrances to the Vorontsovskaya cave

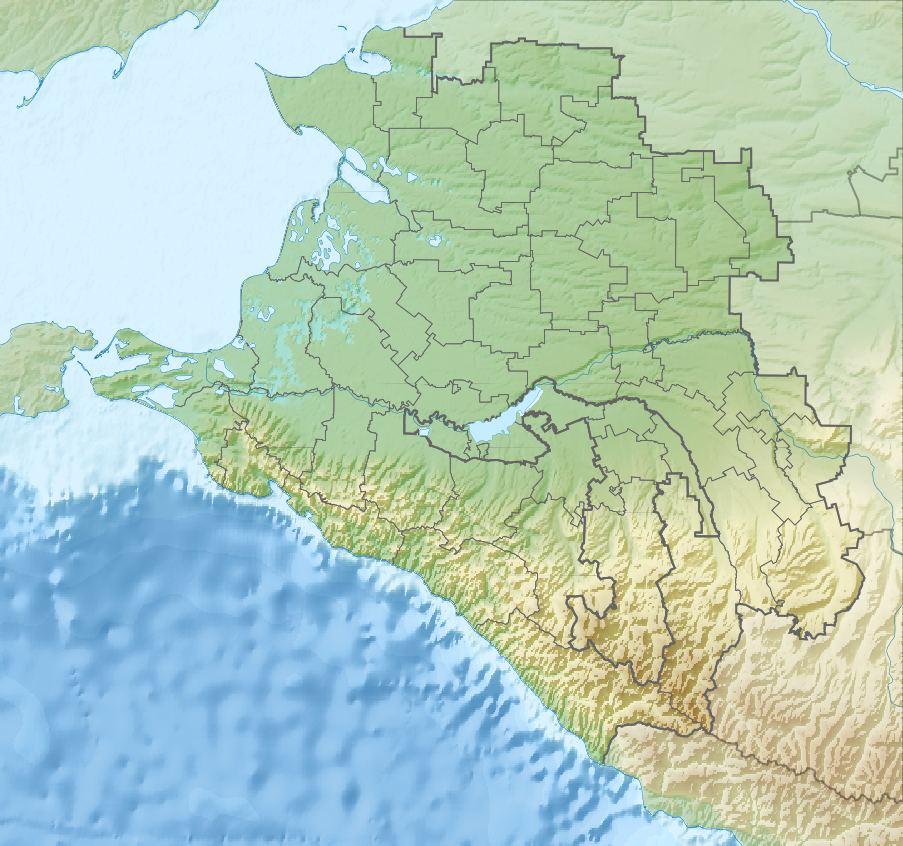
- Location within Krasnodar Krai Location within Russia
- Location: Khosta and Adler, Sochi, Russia
- Coordinates: 43.5197°N 39.977397°E
- Length: 120 m
- Geology: Mesozoic limestone, corrosion-erosion

The Vorontsovskaya Cave System (Воронцовская система пещер) is a long chain of caves in the Khosta and Adler districts of Sochi, Russia. It is part of a range of Mesozoic limestones that runs parallel to the Black Sea coast for 400 km.

The Vorontsovskaya Cave (Воронцовская пещера) was the first cave to be surveyed. It may be accessed through a dozen entrances dotting the slopes of the Kudepsta River valley, at heights ranging from 419 to 720 meters above sea level. The Prometheus Grotto, with a length of over 120 meters, is developed as a tourist destination. The cave takes its name from the nearest settlement, Vorontsovka. It is known to contain bones of cave bears and early humans.

In the late 20th century, it was discovered that the Vorontsovskaya Cave is connected to the Labyrinth Cave, the Kabany Proval, and the Dolgaya Cave by a network of sumps, or siphons. Some cave chambers lie 240 meters higher than the others. This cave system has been mapped to about 12 kilometers. It is ranked as the longest in Krasnodar Krai and the 6th longest in the Russian Federation.

== Gallery ==
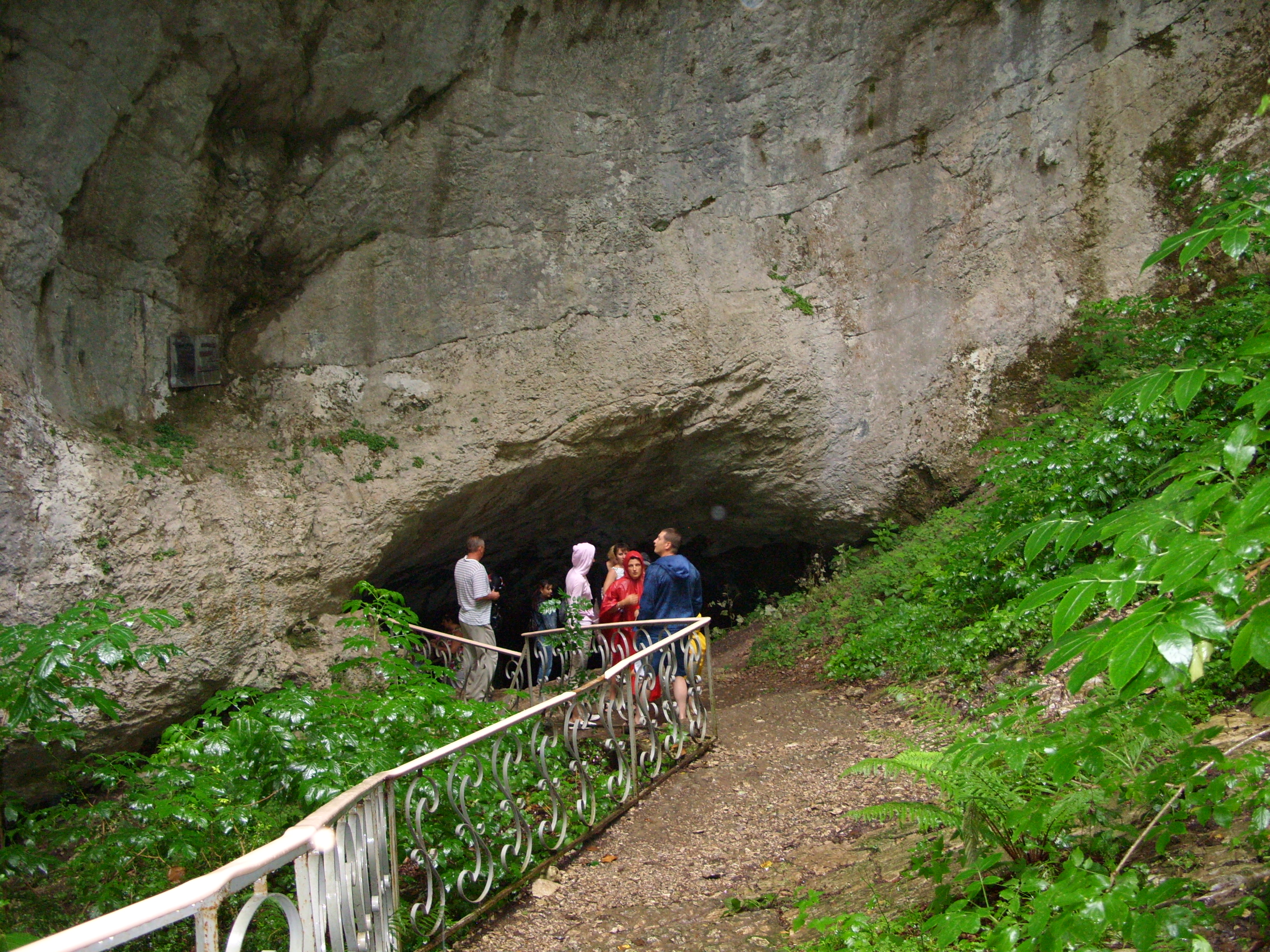

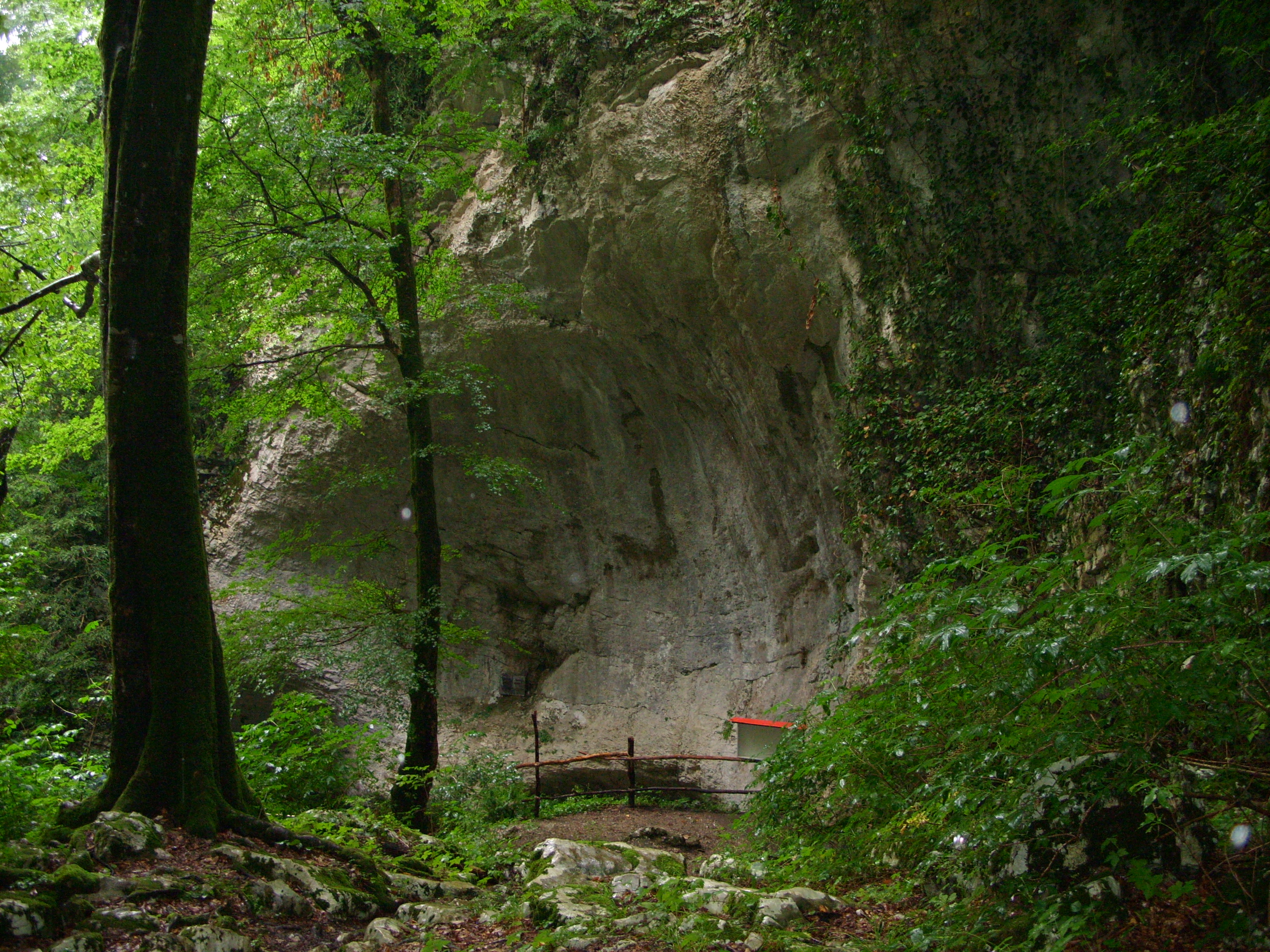

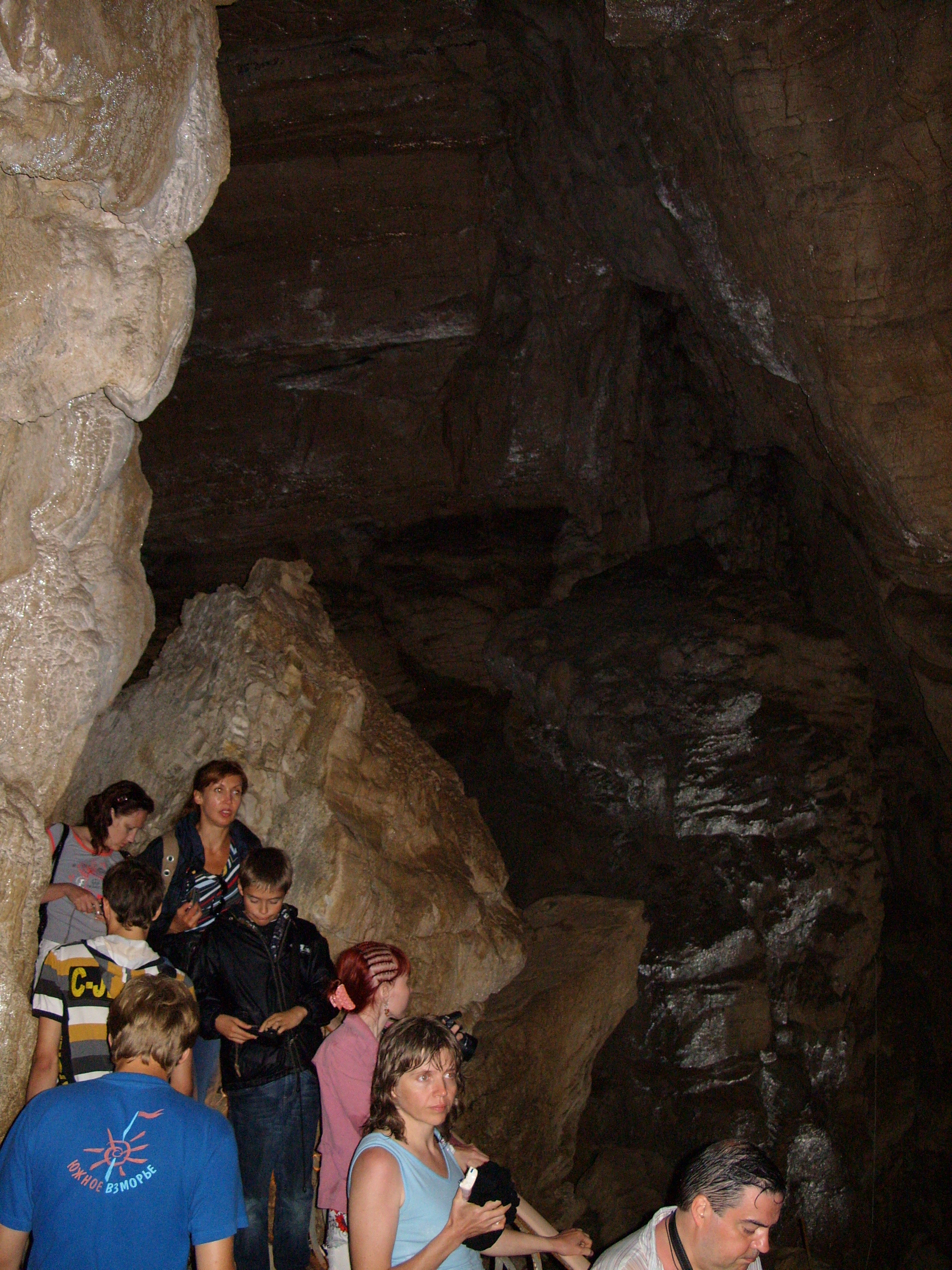

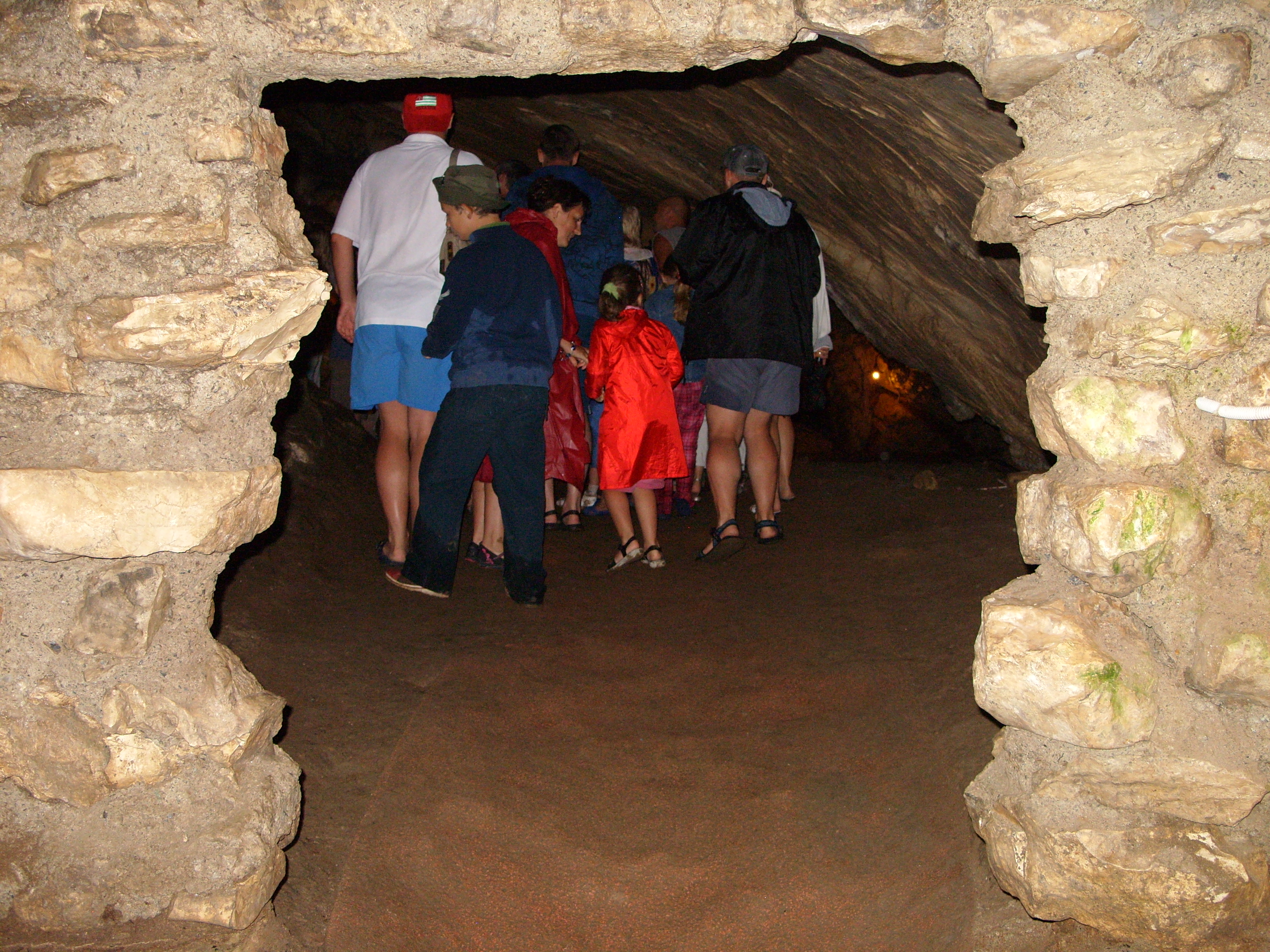
