= Khosta Microdistrict =

Coordinates: 43°30′41.48″N 39°52′5.1″E

Khosta (Russian: Хоста) is a microdistrict in Khostinsky City District in Sochi, Krasnodar Krai, Russia, primarily known as a spa and a resort on the Black Sea coast. Khosta is located in the mouth of the Khosta River, between the center of Sochi and Adler. The area is served by the Khosta railway station.

== History ==
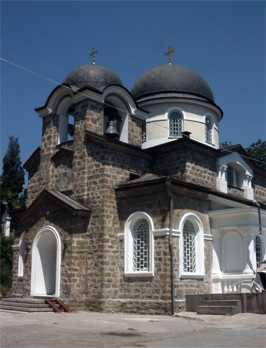
The Transfiguration Church in Khosta

In the Middle Ages, Republic of Genoa established a colony (Costa) at the location of modern Khosta. Eventually the area was taken by the Ottoman Empire, and the settlement was known as Khamysh. After the Russo-Turkish War of 1828–29 it was occupied by the Russian Empire, and the whole population was eventually resettled to Turkey. In 1891—92 the coastal road between Novorossiysk and Batumi was constructed, and first settlers appeared in Khosta. On May 15, 1899, Khosta was granted town status. At the time, it belonged to Black Sea Governorate with the center in Novorossiysk. By 1914, Khosta had a population of 1,500 inhabitants, a brick factory, and a wine production plant.

Soviet Power was declared in Khosta in February 1918, followed by the advance of the army of the Democratic Republic of Georgia, which in July 1918 occupied the whole coast up to Tuapse. In February 1919, they were driven back by the Volunteer Army under command of Anton Denikin. Between January and May 1920, the Red Army recaptured the area.

In 1933, it was decided to totally reconstruct the coastal area and to create a large number of spa resorts. To this end, in October 1934 Khosta was subordinated to the city of Sochi. In the 1950s and the 1960s there was large-scale construction in Khosta.

=== Transportation ===
The railway that connects Adler and Sochi by following the coast has a station in Khosta. Suburban trains from Sochi and from Krasnaya Polyana stop there.

The M27 Highway connecting Novorossiysk with Adler crosses Khosta. The microdistrict is served by the bus system of the city of Sochi.

== Culture and recreation ==
Even though the history of Khosta goes back to the 19th century, there are very few pre-1930 buildings. Those that survived include the Transfiguration Church and a number of pre-1917 dachas (summer houses).

Near surroundings of Khosta are holiday destinations.

- Khosta Fortress, or rather the ruins thereof, perched on the top of a 100-meter high cliff within six kilometers (3.7 miles) from the sea coast.
- The fortress stands on the grounds of an ancient grove of yews and boxwood. The grove covers an area of 301 ha and has been affiliated with the Caucasus Zapovednik since 1931 and is the World Heritage Site as a part of the Zapovednik.
- The Akhun massif comprises Greater Akhun Mtn. (663 m), Lesser Akhun Mtn. (501 m), and Eagle Bluff (380 m). Greater Akhun is crowned by a Neo-Romanesque limestone tower (1936).

== Eponyms ==
- Khostalestes kochetkovi, a slug species discovered in the mountains north of Khosta, is named after Khosta.
