= Mzymta =

Mzymta River
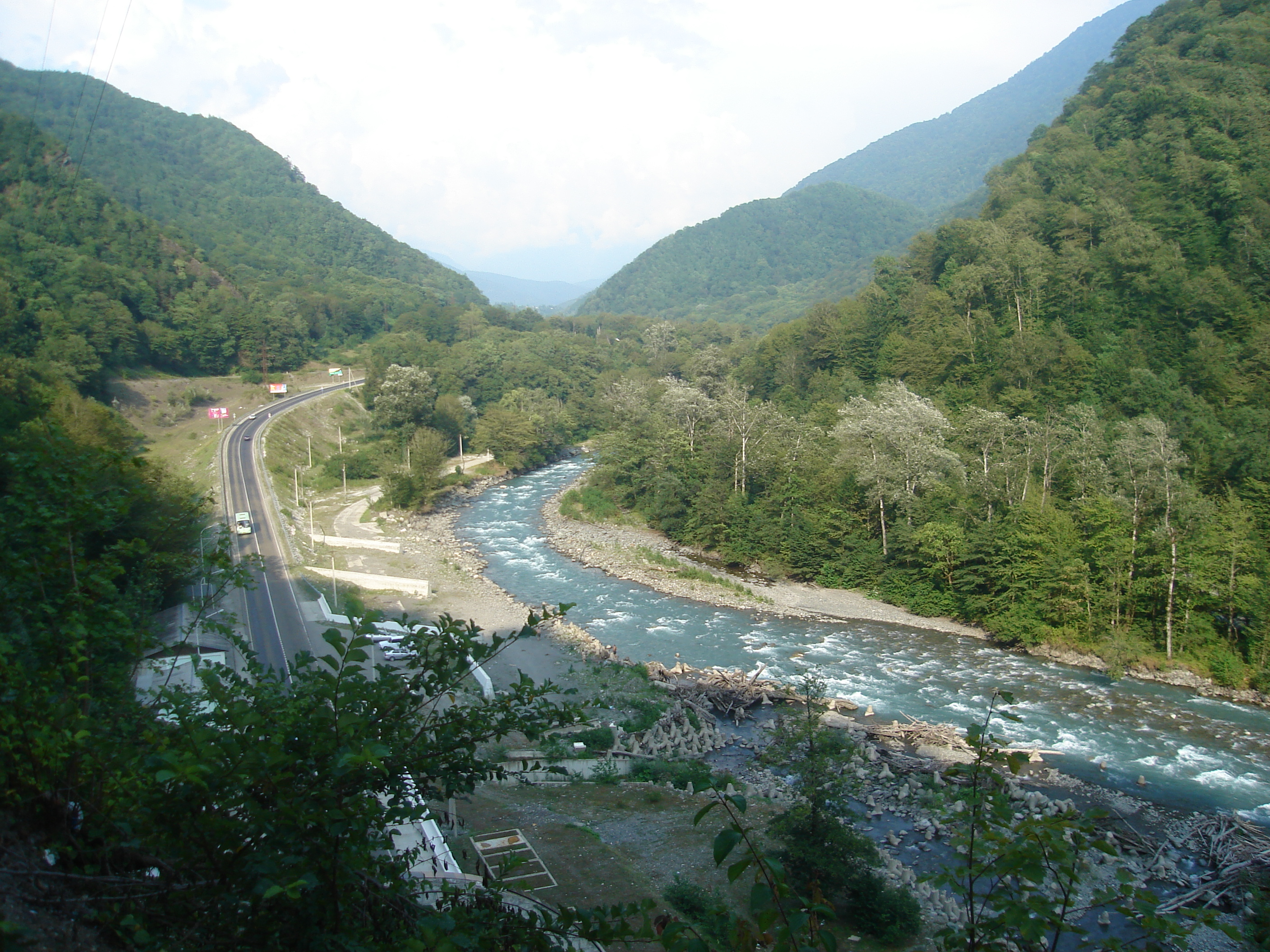
- Mzymta from Maidens' Eyewater waterfall

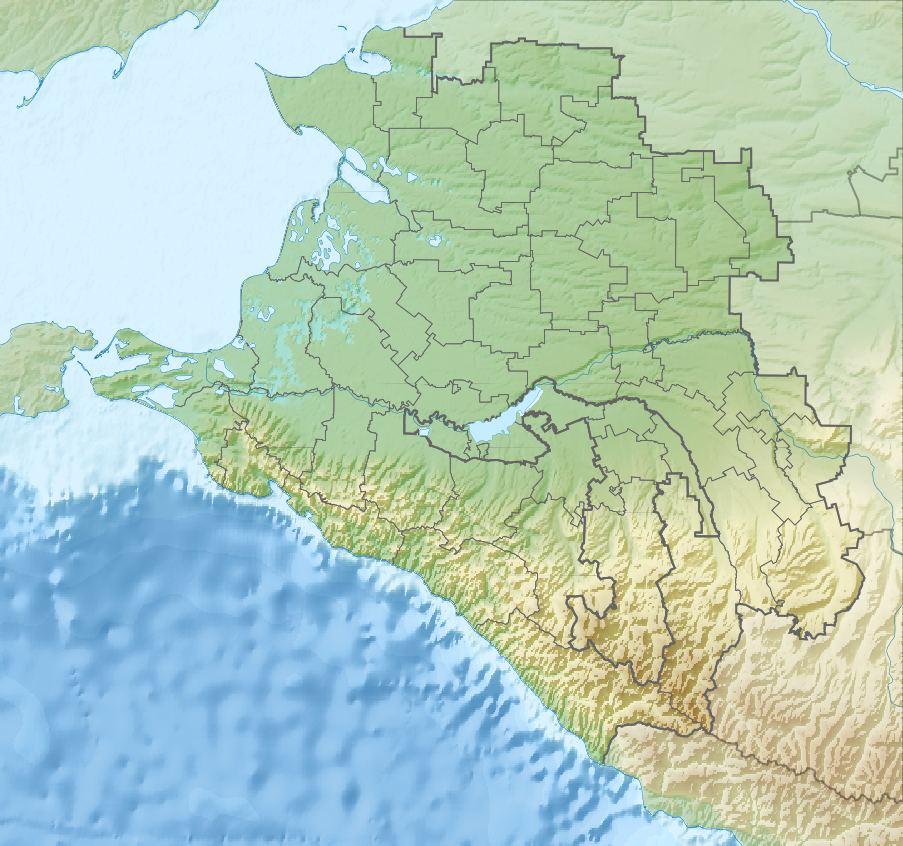

Location
- Country: Russia
- Federal subject: Krasnodar Krai: Adlersky City District of Sochi

Physical characteristics
- Source
  - location: Greater Caucasus
  - elevation: 2,980 m (9,780 ft)
- Mouth
  - location: Black Sea
  - coordinates: 43°24′57″N 39°55′25″E
  - elevation: 0 m (0 ft)
- Length: 89 km (55 mi)
- Basin size: 885 km^{2} (342 sq mi)
- Discharge
  - average: 45.6 m^{3}/s (1,610 cu ft/s) (near mouth)

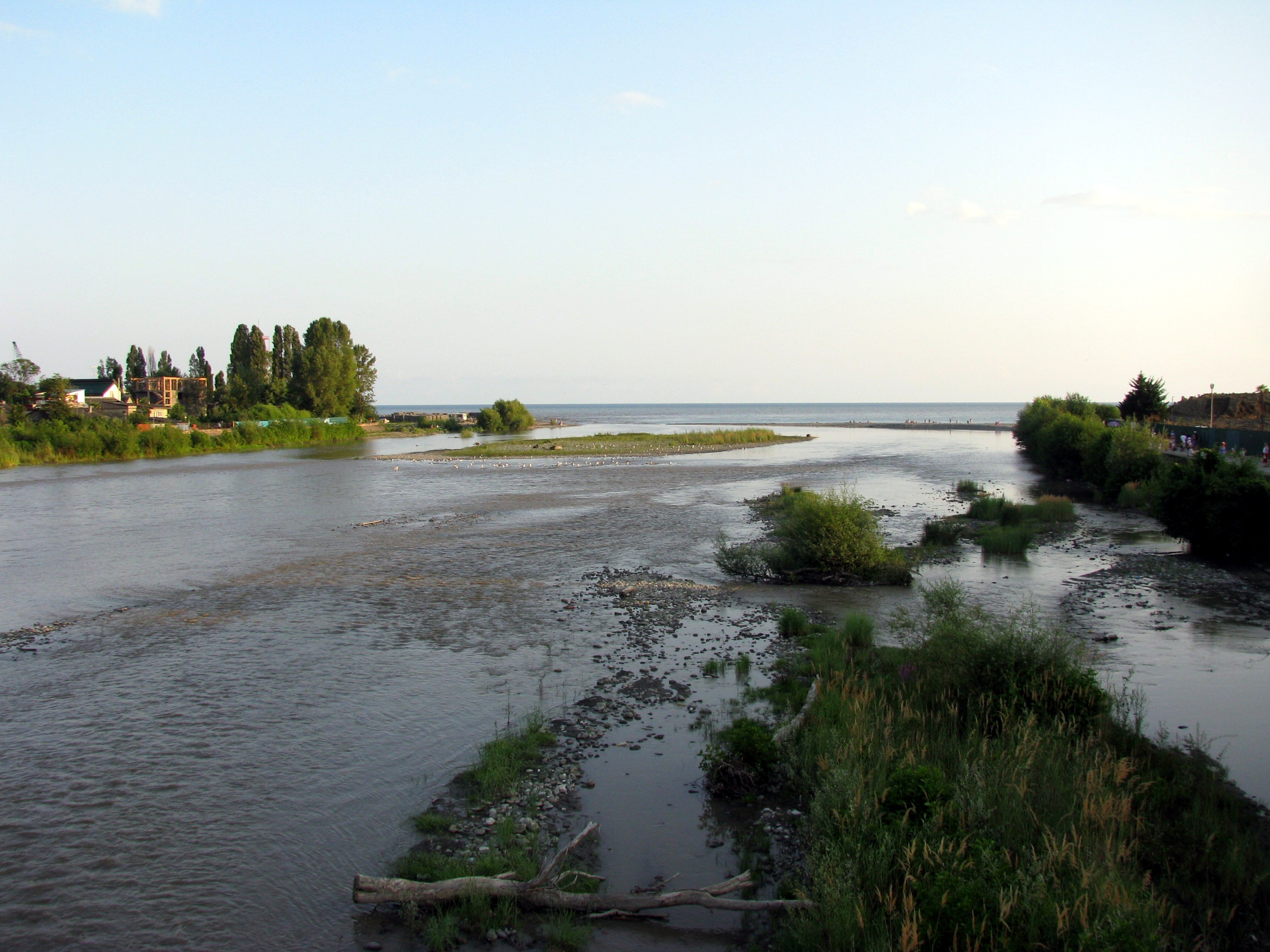
Mzymta emptying into the Black Sea

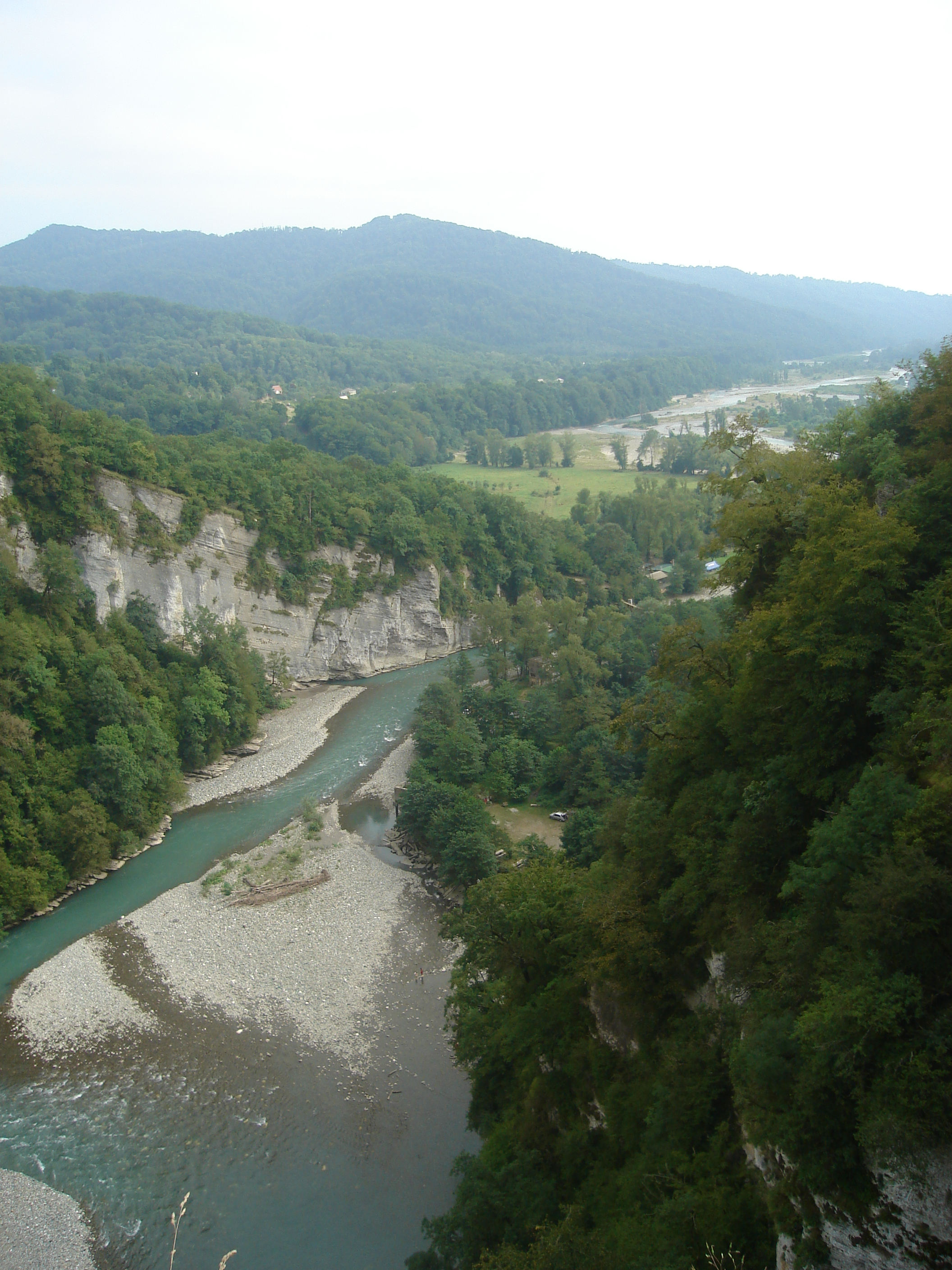
Mzymta from the Akhshtyrskaya cave

The Mzymta (Russian: Мзы́мта; Abkhaz: Мӡы́мҭа; Adyghe: Мэзмытӏэ, Mezmytha) is a river in Northwestern Caucasus, flowing through Mostovsky District and the city of Sochi (Adlersky city district) of Krasnodar Krai, Russia. The Mzymta is the largest river in Russia emptying into the Black Sea. It is 89 kilometres (55 mi) long with a watershed of 885 square kilometres (342 sq mi). All the venues of the 2014 Winter Olympics were in the Mzymta Valley.

== Geography ==
The source of the Mzymta is Lake Verkhny Kardyvach in Western Caucasus, at a height of 2,980 metres (9,780 ft). The upper course of the river is located within the Caucasus Nature Reserve. The Mzymta flows in a narrow valley through Lake Kardyvach and forms several waterfalls, the biggest of which is the Izumrudny (Emerald) waterfall, 15 metres (49 ft). Downstream of Lake Kardyvach, the river flows west and enters Sochi National Park. The banks are covered with beech forests and chestnuts, and also ancient Ubykh gardens with wild pear, walnut and chestnut. In Esto-Sadok and Krasnaya Polyana, the Mzymta flows through its first urban area, where some of the events of the 2014 Winter Olympics took place. Downstream it turns south. The Mzymta comes through the Akhshtyr and Dzykhra gorges, which are popular tourist attractions. The Mzymta enters the Black Sea in Adler, where the rest of the Winter Olympics took place. At the mouth, there is a big talus train, dividing into branches across the floodplains. Mzymta carries large amounts of silt out to sea. Mineral springs are also found in the catchment basin. The river is fed by spring tides and rain freshets.

The Mzymta is a floatable river, and a popular attraction is rafting. Krasnopolyanskaya hydroelectric power station has a reservoir with a daily streamflow regulation.

== Average intensity of flow ==
- Krasnaya Polyana: 33.2 cubic metres per second (1,170 cu ft/s)
- Kepsh: 45.6 cubic metres per second (1,610 cu ft/s) (max 764 cubic metres per second (27,000 cu ft/s))

== Major inflows ==
- Pslukh
- Pudziko
- Chvizhepse

== Inhabited localities ==
- Estosadok
- Krasnaya Polyana
- Chvizhepse
- Kepsha
- Monastyr
- Galitsyno
- Kazachy Brod
- Vysokoye
- Moldovka
- Adler
