= Estosadok =

Estonian village in Russia

Coordinates: 43°41′N 40°16′E

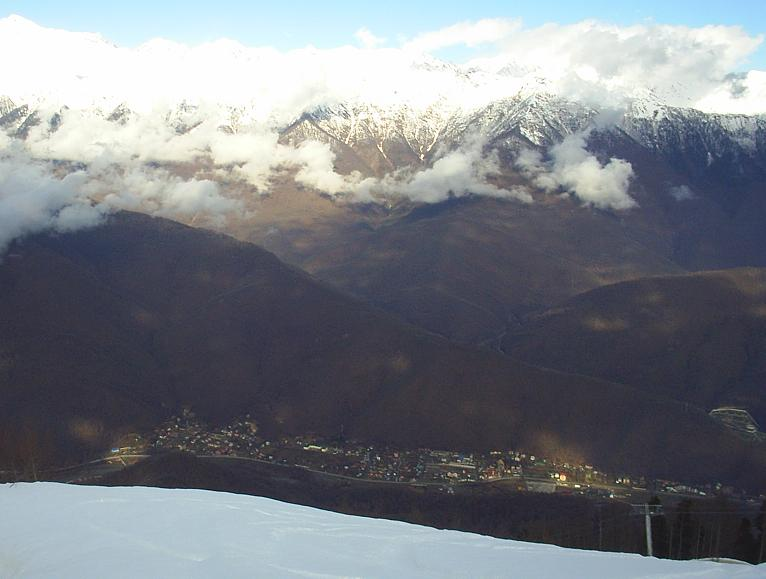
View on Estosadok from Aibga Mountain

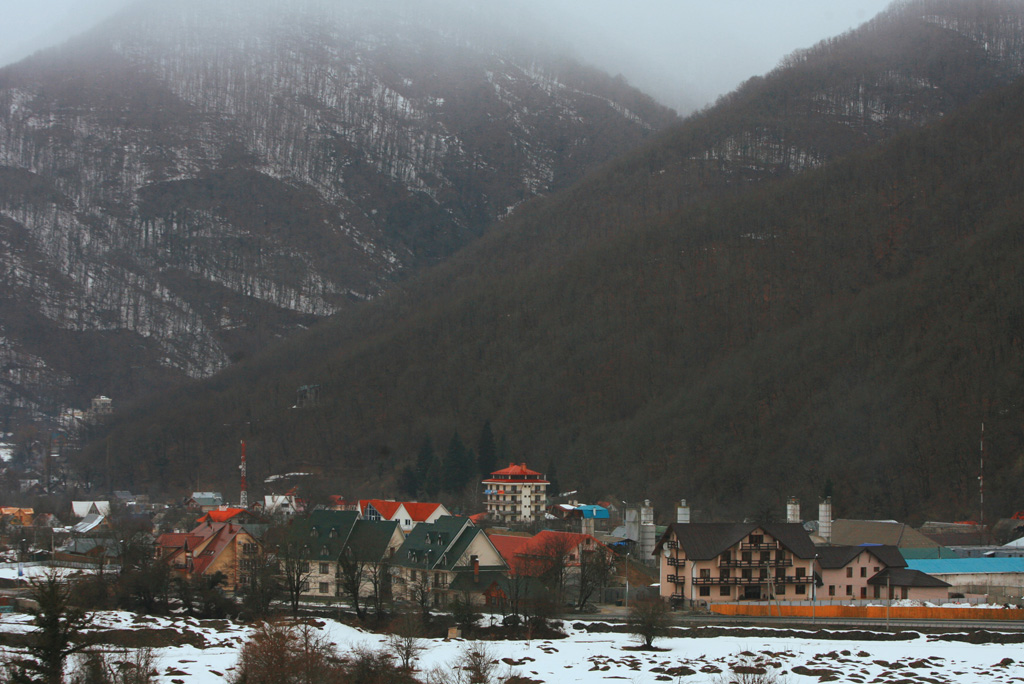

Estosadok, sometimes spelled Esto-Sadok or Estosadoc (Russian: Э́стосадо́к or Э́сто-Садо́к; Estonian: Eesti Aiake, lit. Little Estonian Garden) is a rural locality (a selo) under the administrative jurisdiction of Adlersky City District of the City of Sochi in Krasnodar Krai, Russia, located in the Caucasus Mountains on the Mzymta, 4 kilometers (2.5 mi) upstream from Krasnaya Polyana. Estosadok is adjacent to Caucasus Nature Reserve.

The locality was founded in 1886 by Estonian settlers, after the territory was depopulated as a consequence of the Circassian genocide. It was originally called Estonka, and in 1903 renamed Estosadok.

It is the location of the alpine ski resort Alpika-Service. The economy of Estosadok mostly serves the ski resort.

The sights in Estosadok include the ruins of Achipse fortress as well as the museum of Estonian writer Anton Tammsaare in the house where he lived in the beginning of the 20th century to cure tuberculosis.

Esto-Sadok railway station, opened in 2014, connects this area with Adler railway station, with further connections to Sochi International Airport, Sochi Olympic Village, and central Sochi, as well as with Roza Khutor railway station and the eastern end of Krasnaya Polyana.
