= Roza Khutor railway station =

Railway station in Sochi, Russia

Coordinates: 43°40′36.6″N 40°16′46″E

Roza Khutor Роза Хутор
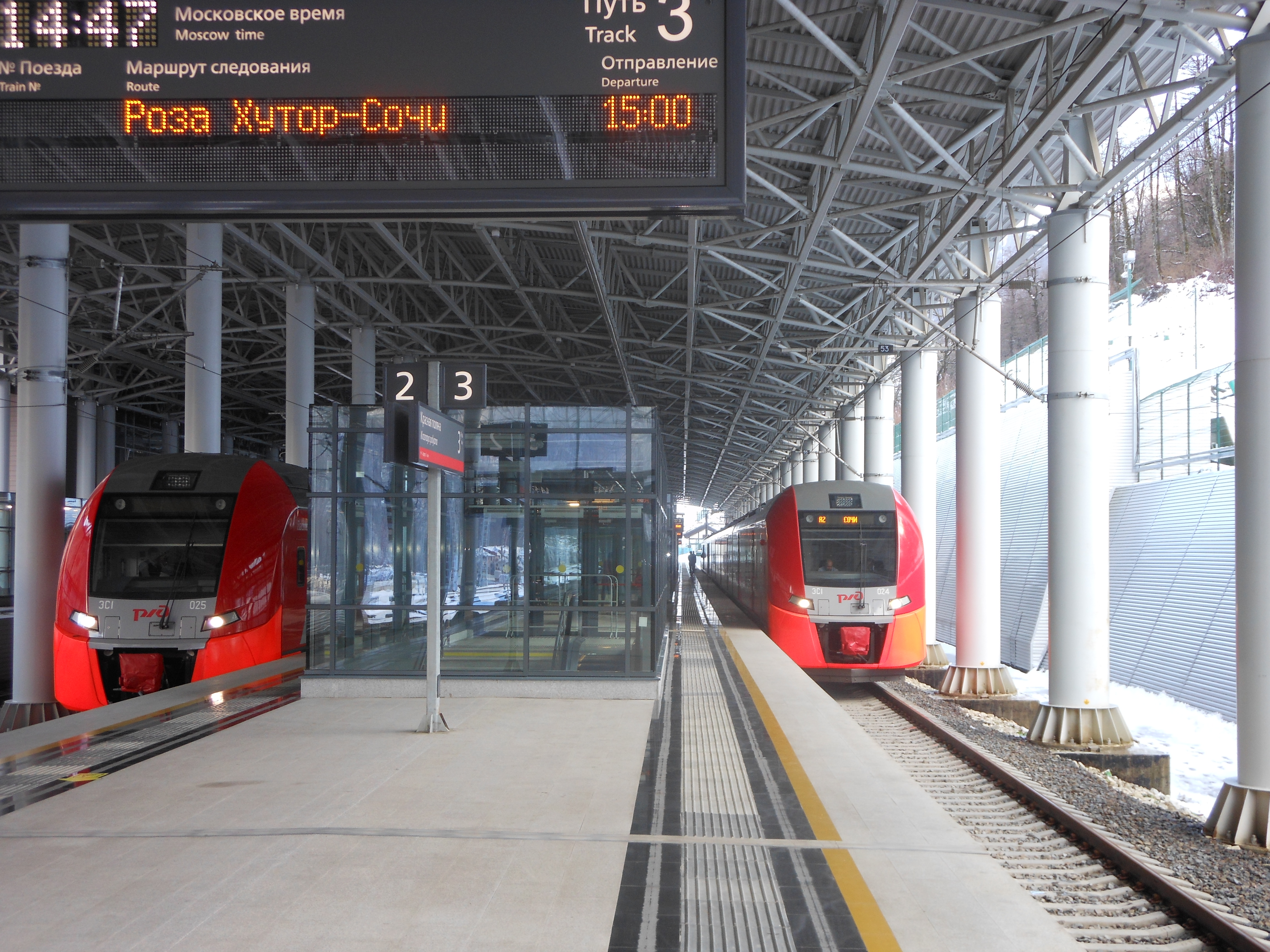
- Platform of the station and 2 Lastochka trains

General information
- Location: Estosadok, Krasnaya Polyana, Sochi; Krasnodar Krai; Russia
- Owner: Russian Railways
- Operator: North Caucasus Railway
- Platforms: 2
- Tracks: 3

Construction
- Structure type: At-grade

History
- Opened: 2013
- Former names: Krasnaya Polyana

Services
Preceding station	Russian Railways	Following station
Olympic Village towards Adler	Adler–Roza Khutor	Terminus
Location

Roza Khutor, formerly Krasnaya Polyana (Russian: Роза Хутор) is a railway station in Estosadok, Krasnaya Polyana, Sochi, Krasnodar Krai, Russia. This is the terminal station of the railway line which branches off at Adler railway station and was constructed to accommodate the visitors for the 2014 Winter Olympics. The construction started in spring 2010 by NGO Mostovik. The station was open in 2013 as Krasnaya Polyana. In late 2014, it was renamed to Roza Khutor.
