= Mount Akhun =

Mountain in Sochi, Russia

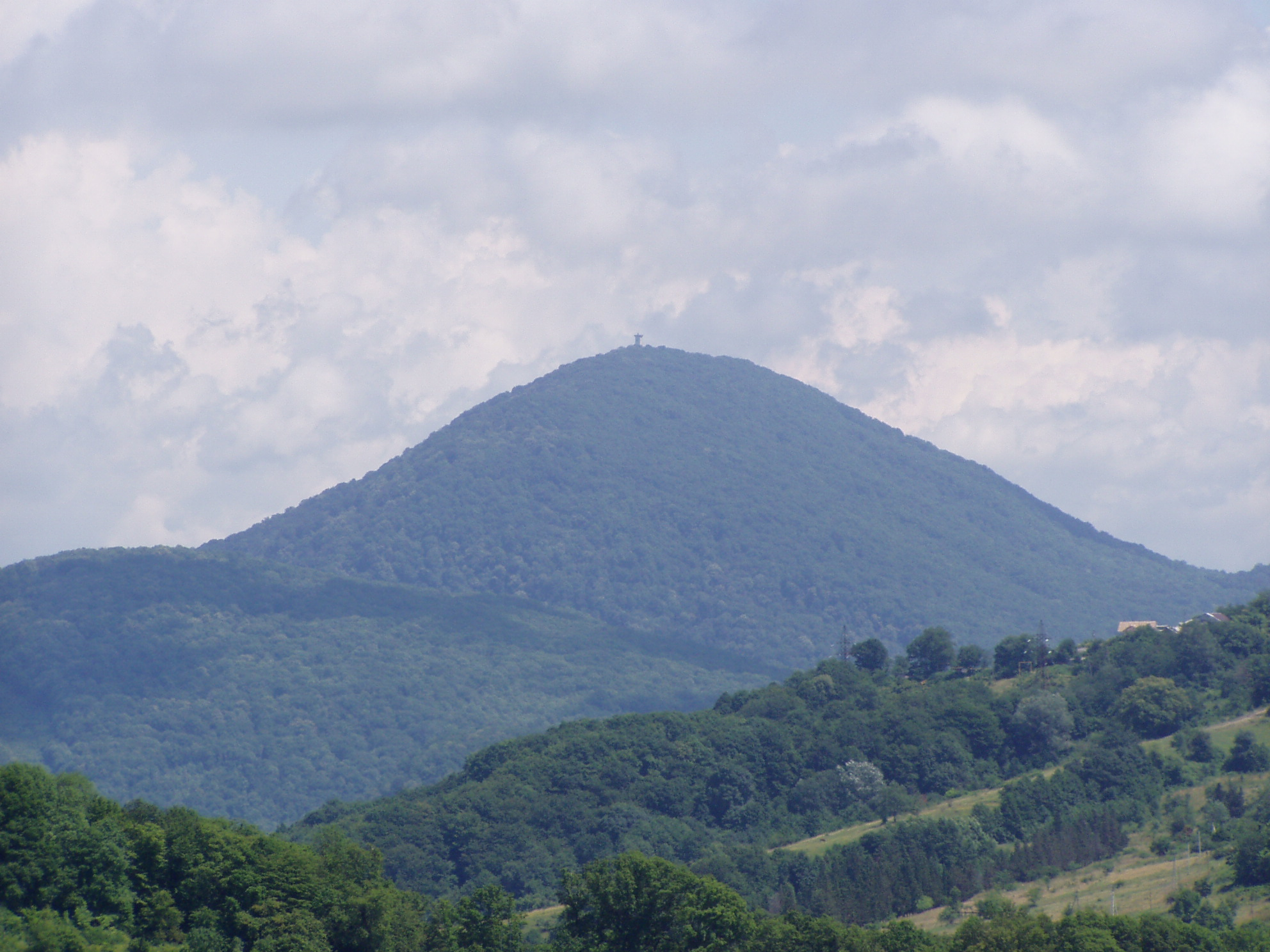
- Mount Akhun

Highest point
- Elevation: 663 m (2,175 ft)
- Coordinates: 43°33′02″N 39°50′36″E

Geography
- Location within Russia
- Location: Khostinsky City District, Sochi, Russia

Mount Akhun (Ахун) is a stand-alone mountain in the Khostinsky City District of Sochi, Russia. Wedged between the Matsesta and Khosta rivers, this karst massif is the highest point of the Sochi littoral.

The peak of Greater Akhun is 663 metres (2,175 ft) above sea level. Its summit is marked by a 100-foot-tall Romanesque tower. It was built in 1936 from limestone ashlar. The tower offers panoramic views of the Western Caucasus as far south as Gagra and Pitsunda. An 11-km-long serpentine road leads to the tower from the Sputnik Hotel.

Lesser Akhun rises to an elevation of 501 m (1,644 ft). Nearby are the ruins of a medieval Christian church. The entire massif contains about 20 caves. The forests support 200 species of higher plants. The scenic Eagles' Rocks stretch along the right bank of the Agura River toward the Agura Falls.

The mount was apparently sacred for the local Ubykh community. Its name translates from the Ubykh dialect as "the mountain giant".

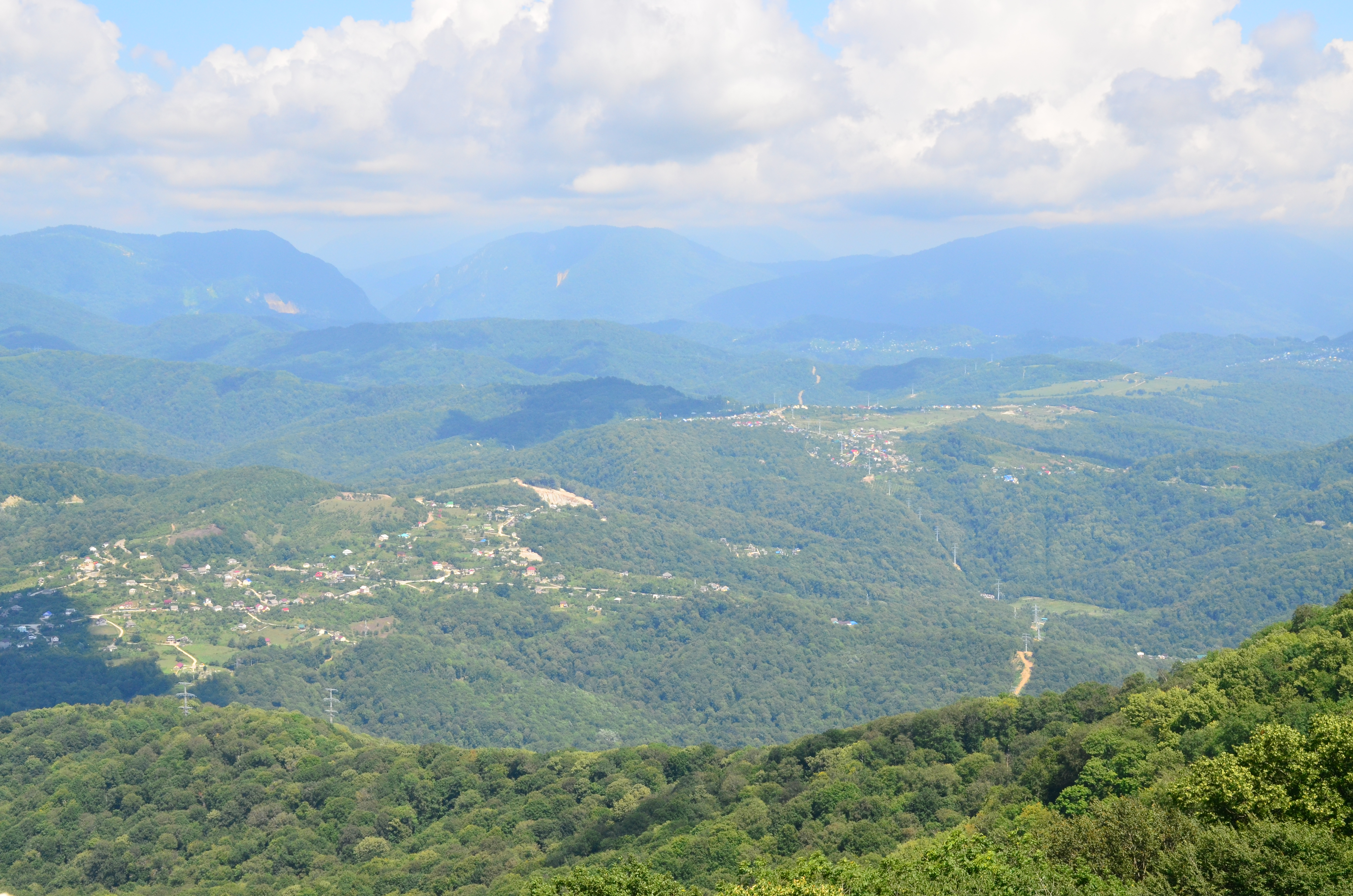
View from the top

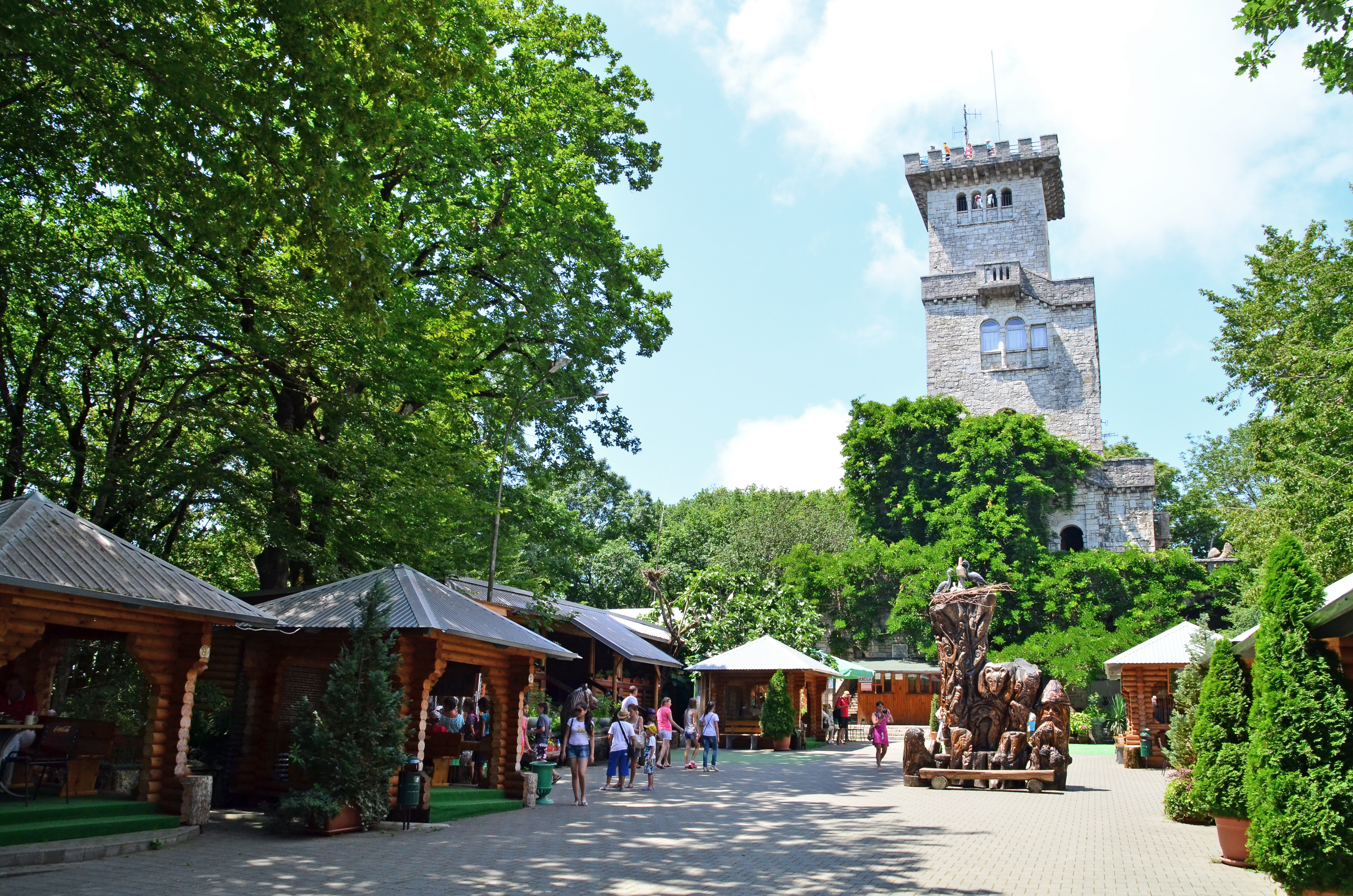
The Akhun Tower
