= Adler, Russia =

Russian Black Sea resort in Sochi

Coordinates: 43°26′N 39°55′E

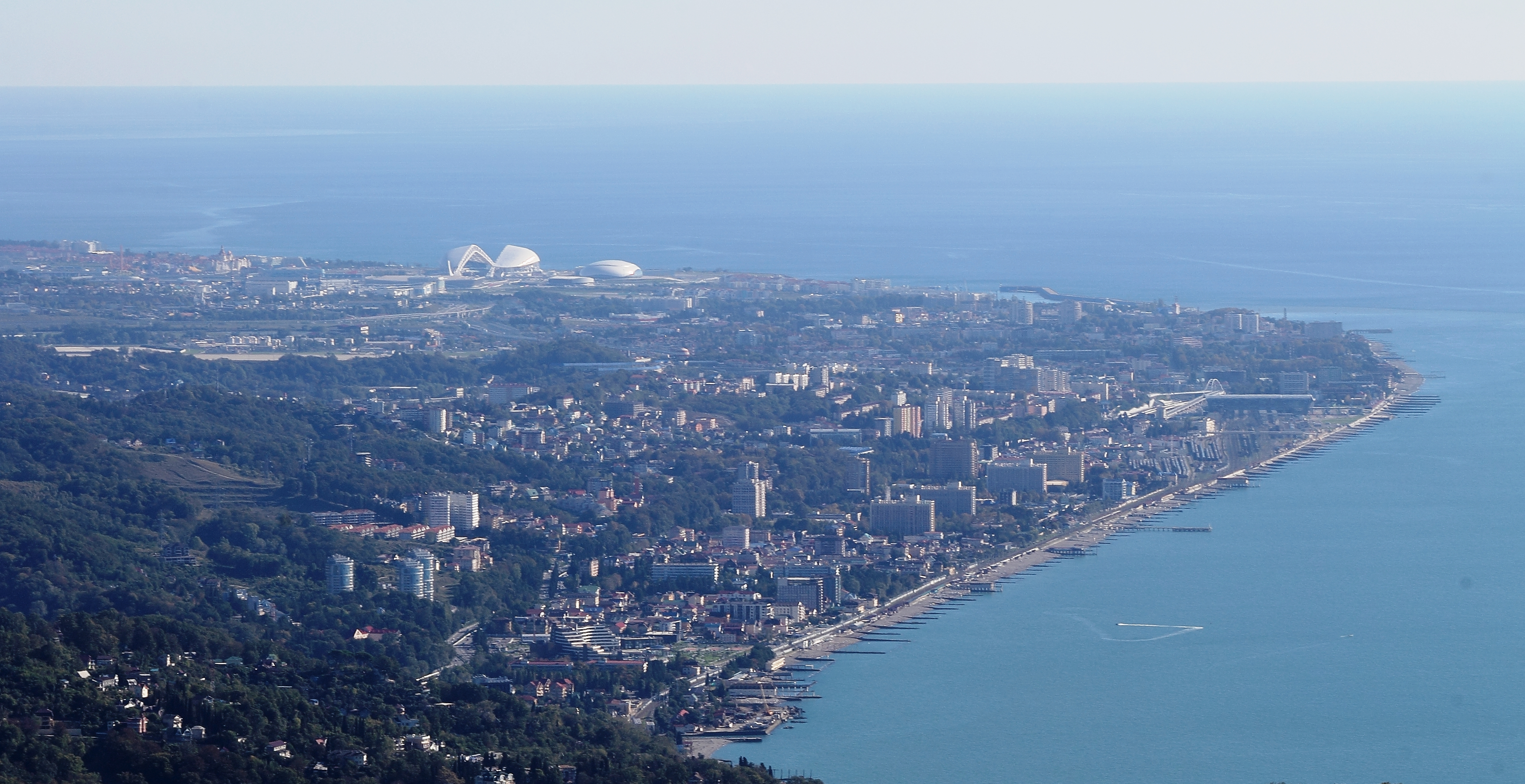
Adler from mount Akhun

Adler (Russian: Адлер; Georgian: ადლერი; Armenian: Ադլեր; Ukrainian: Адлер) is a resort on the Black Sea coast located in a river valley by the mouth of the Mzymta River. Formerly a resort settlement, now it is a residential district of Sochi, Krasnodar Krai, Russia, an administrative center of its Adlersky city district.

== History ==
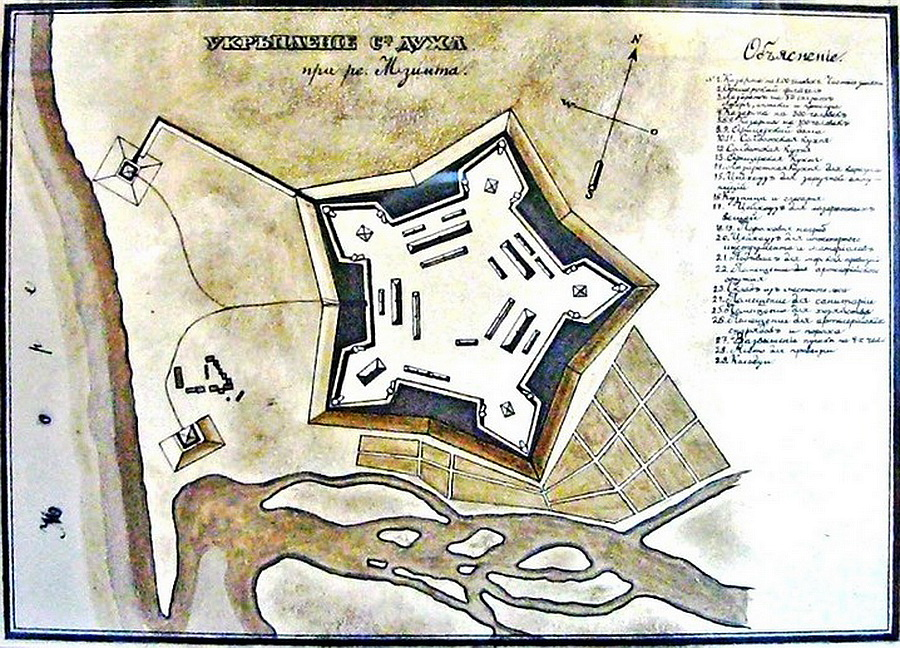
Holy Spirit fort

The Holy Spirit fortress was founded here by Russians in 1837. However, the region was inhabited before the Russian arrival. Since ancient times, a Sadz Abkhazian village, named Liesh, had been located there. In the 12th century, the Genoese founded a factory here, known as Layso. During that time this land belonged to the Sadz princes of Aredba, which had one of their main settlements there.

Turks called this place Artlar or Artı. Russians mispronounced it as Adler (from German Adler, meaning "eagle"). However, another theory postulates that the name comes from the brig Adler.

According to the 1926 census, the settlement had a population of 2,215, by ethnicity: 29.5% Russian, 22.7% Ukrainian, 11.2% Greek, 10.9% Georgian, and 6.8% Armenian.

The area used to be swampy and a source of malaria. By 1956 the land was irrigated and malaria was conquered with the help of Gambusia fish. In 1961 the whole Adlersky district, (together with the Lazarevsky district) was incorporated into Sochi.

The coastal cluster in Adler of the Olympic park, 2014 Winter Olympics in Sochi

== Geography ==
Adler has a pebbly and narrow beach, backed by the railway in some places. There are Russian Orthodox churches of the Trinity and the Holy Spirit, as well as the Armenian Saint Sarkis Cathedral.

There are also the Adlersky District History Museum and the South Cultures park in Adler.
