= Matsesta railway station =

Railway station in Sochi, Russia

Coordinates: 43°32′40.4″N 39°47′19.6″E

Khosta Станция Хоста
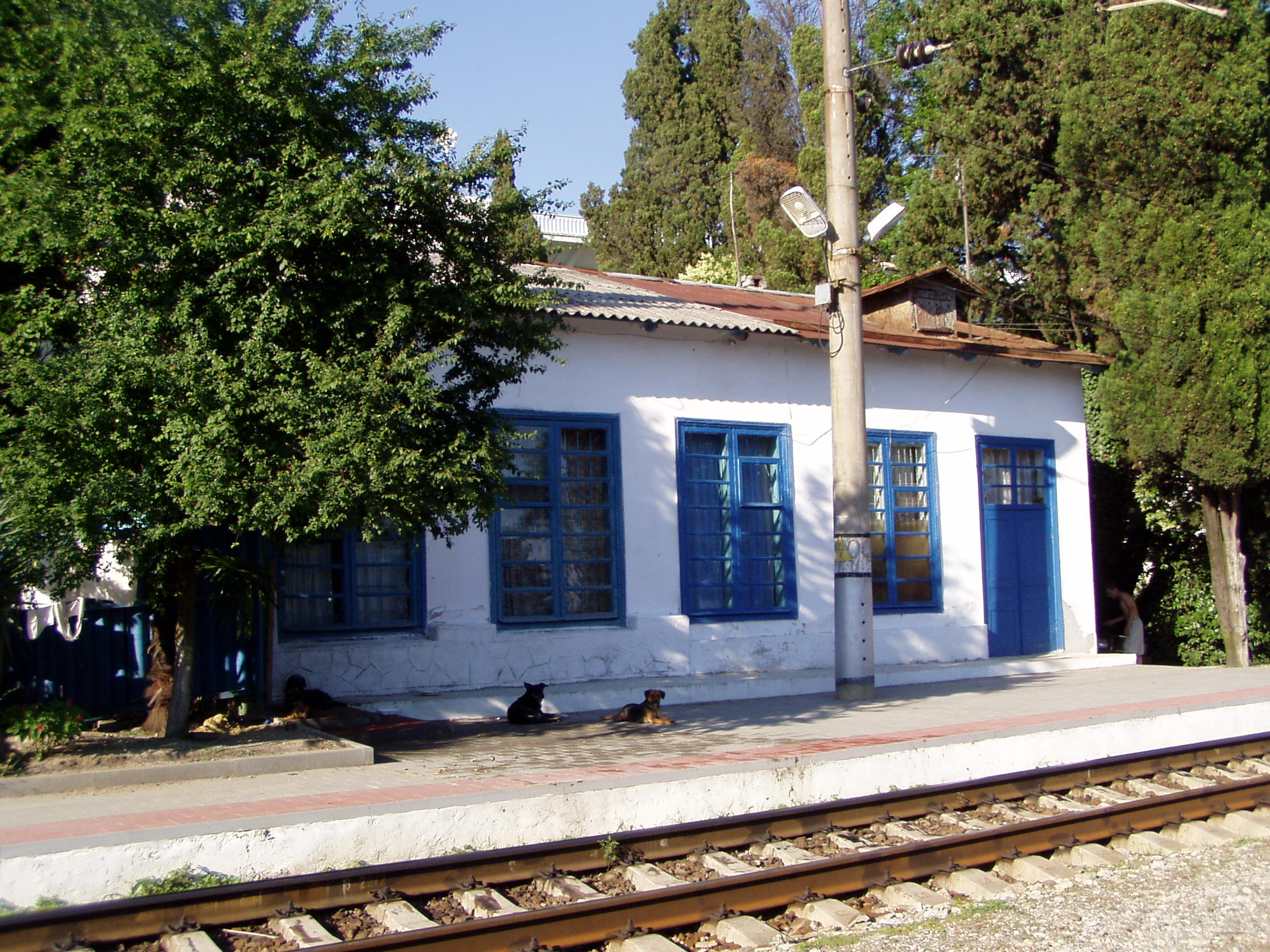
- Matsesta station in 2007

General information
- Location: Matsesta Microdistrict, Khostinsky city district, Sochi; Krasnodar Krai; Russia
- Owner: Russian Railways
- Operator: North Caucasus Railway
- Platforms: 1
- Tracks: 3

Construction
- Structure type: At-grade

History
- Opened: 1929

Services
Preceding station	Russian Railways	Following station
Sochi towards Krivenkovskaya	Krivenkovskaya–Vesioloye	Khosta towards Vesyoloye
Location

Matsesta railway station (Russian: станция Мацеста) is a railway station in the Matsesta Microdistrict, Khostinsky City District, Sochi, Russia. The station was opened in 1929.

In Soviet times, the station had also been used hitherto preserved Matsestinskaya branch from the station to the Old Matsesta Matsesty built as the main highway in 1925. It was built for passenger and freight traffic, was subsequently used only for freight traffic for delivery to the bathrooms resort building Matsesta oil and removal from mineral sources of hydrogen sulfide water resort for its delivery in Clinics Greater Sochi.
