= Khosta railway station =

Railway station in Russia

Coordinates: 43°30′41″N 39°51′51″E

Khosta Станция Хоста
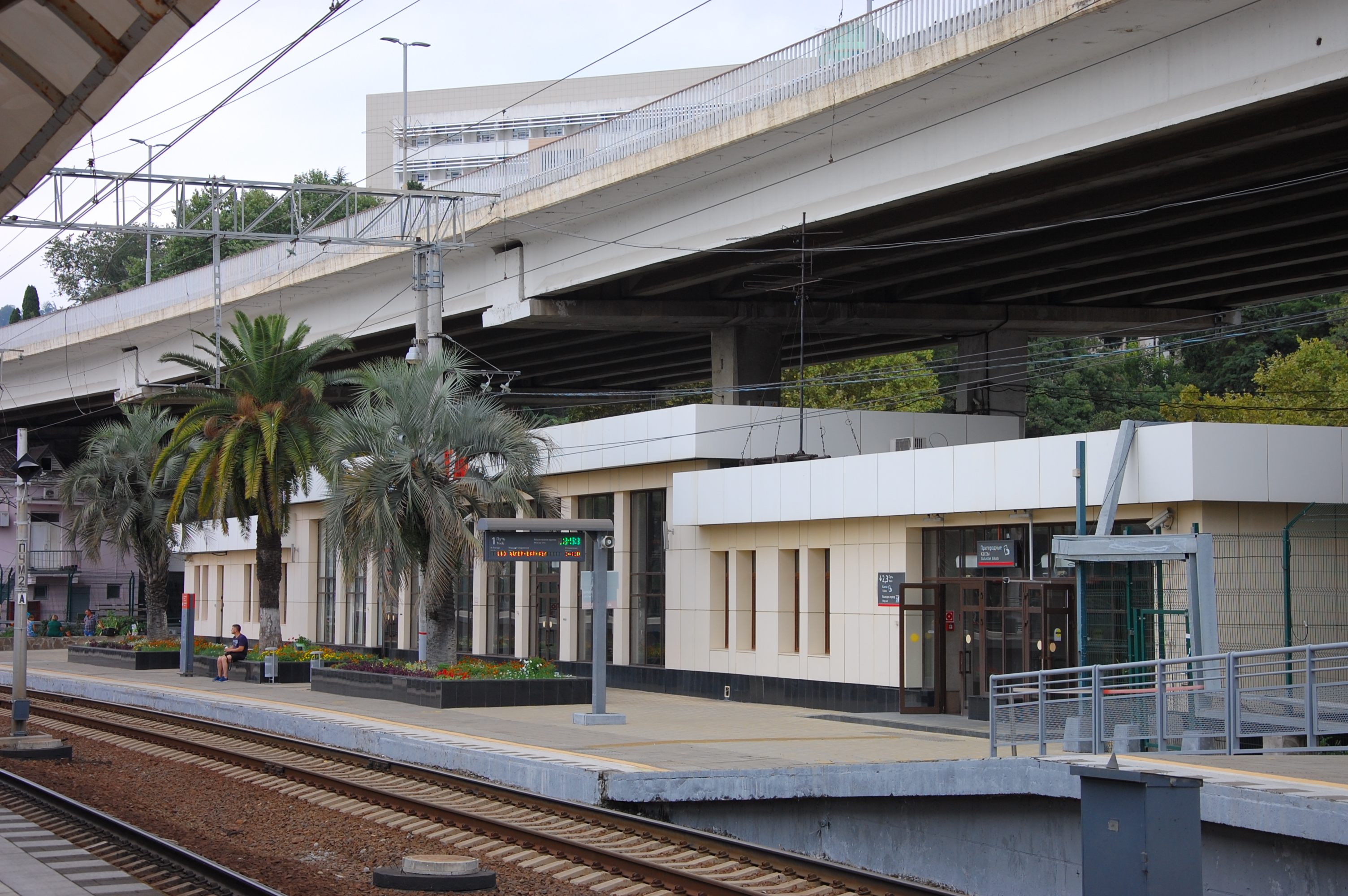
- Khosta railway station in 2019

General information
- Location: Khosta, Khostinsky city district, Sochi; Krasnodar Krai; Russia
- Owner: Russian Railways
- Operator: North Caucasus Railway
- Platforms: 2
- Tracks: 3

Construction
- Structure type: At-grade
- Parking: Yes

History
- Opened: 1963

Services
Preceding station	Russian Railways	Following station
Matsesta towards Krivenkovskaya	Krivenkovskaya–Vesioloye	Izvestiya towards Vesyoloye
Location

Khosta railway station (Russian: Станция Хоста) is a railway station of the North Caucasus Railway, a subsidiary of Russian Railways, located in Khosta, Khostinsky City District of Sochi, Krasnodar Krai, Russia.

The station was built between 1961 and 1963 and sits on the Sochi–Adler section of the Tuapse–Sukhum railway. The station has three tracks, all of which can serve electric locomotives. There are three platforms connected by a pedestrian subway tunnel. In 2012 the station was renovated and now has carriage-level platforms and mobility access.

The station is situated next to the beach and partially under the coastal highway.
