= Sochi railway station =

Railway station in Sochi, Russia

Sochi Сочи
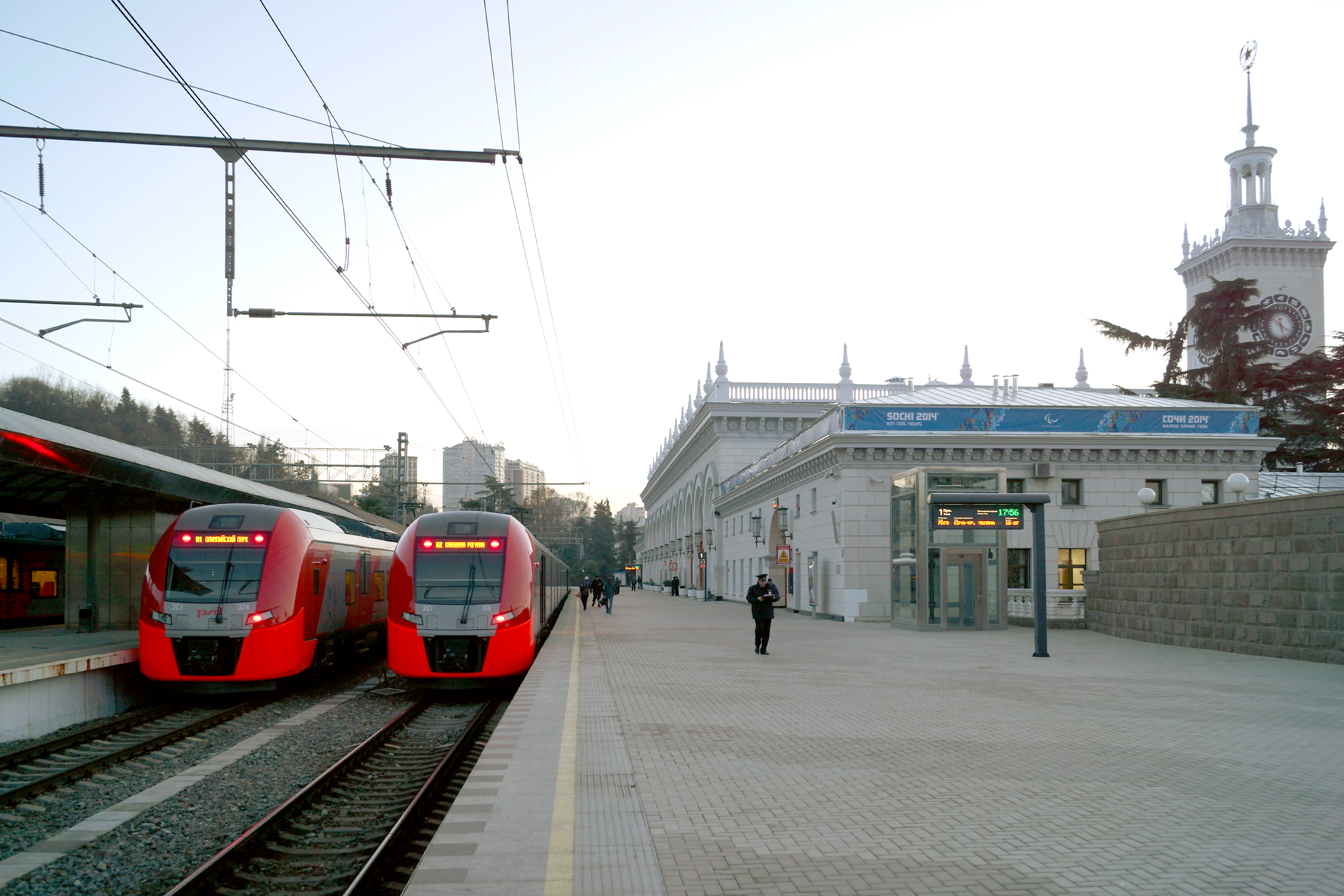
- View to Sochi station building from platform 2.

General information
- Location: Gorky Str. 56, Tsentralny city district, Sochi; Krasnodar Krai; Russia
- Coordinates: 43°35′29″N 39°43′42″E
- Owner: Russian Railways
- Operator: North Caucasus Railway
- Line: Krasnodar–Sukhumi
- Distance: 135 km (83.9 mi) to Sukhumi
- Platforms: 3
- Tracks: 10

Construction
- Structure type: At-grade
- Parking: Yes
- Cycle facilities: Yes

Other information
- Station code: 532909

History
- Opened: 1916
- Rebuilt: 1923, 1952
- Electrified: 1956

Services
Preceding station	Russian Railways	Following station
Mamayka towards Krivenkovskaya	Krivenkovskaya–Vesioloye	Matsesta towards Vesyoloye
Location

Sochi railway station (Russian: Сочи) is the largest of the four railway stations in Sochi, Russia, and one of the largest railway stations in Krasnodar Krai. It is part of North Caucasus Railway and located in the Tsentralny city district of Sochi.

It was renovated for the 2014 Winter Olympics, alongside Sochi's three other railway stations: Dagomys, Matsesta and Khosta.

== History ==
The place for the construction of the railway terminal was defined in 1913, at the fairgrounds (now the Railway Station Square) in front of the city cemetery (now Zavokzalny memorial complex).

The present, much larger building of the railway station was designed by Alexey Dushkin. Its construction was started on 13 September 1950 and completed on 10 September 1952, and the luggage section was added in 1956. In the 1950s Sochi played an important role in the Soviet Unions, being a major transit point from Russia to Georgia and the most popular health resort for a large number of ordinary citizens and Communist Party leaders, including Joseph Stalin. Consequently, the station construction was curated by an unusually large number of ministries, and by Stalin himself. While Dushkin's design was considered elegant by many curators, including Stalin, it was criticised by others for excessive costs. Dushkin built a twin version of the Sochi station in Simferopol in 1951. In 1975, the Sochi station was included to the Russian list of architectural monuments of federal importance.

== Layout ==
The building is 145 m long, 30–50 m wide and 55 m tall from the earth level to the star on the clock tower. The tower is separated from the main building and features a clock of 5 m diameter. The clock's dial is encircled by the zodiac signs; their sequence is unusual, and Dushkin did not leave a clue to his arrangement.

The building has three inner yards with a sculpture and fountains. The sculpture Girl with a jug is one of the city symbols. It is a copy of the original preserved at the city museum.

== Gallery ==
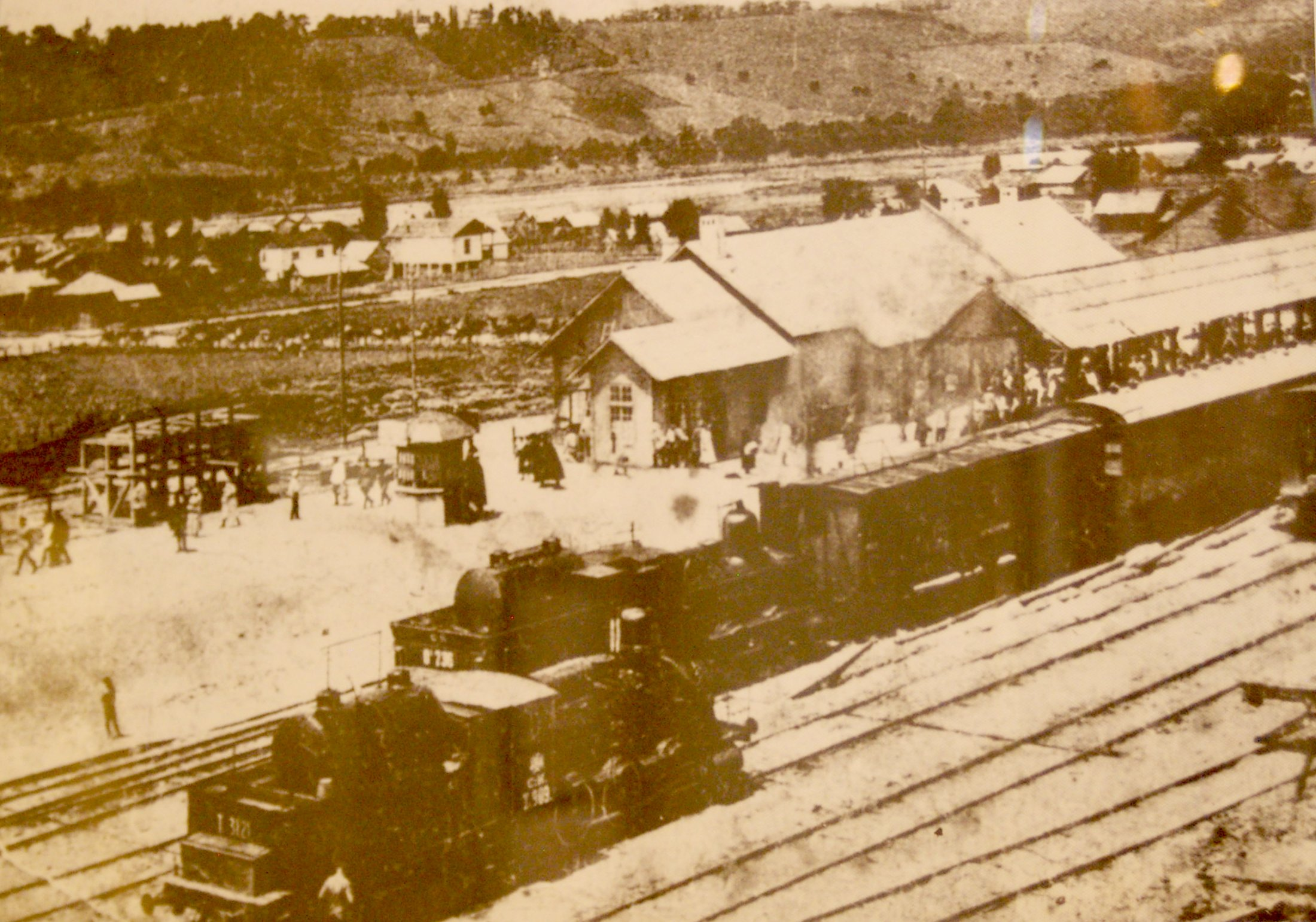
1916

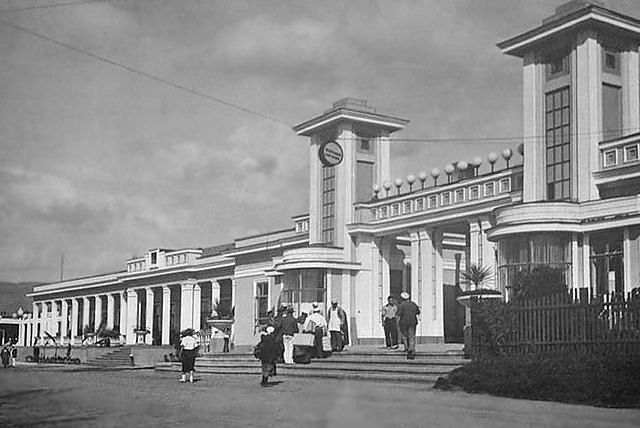
1939

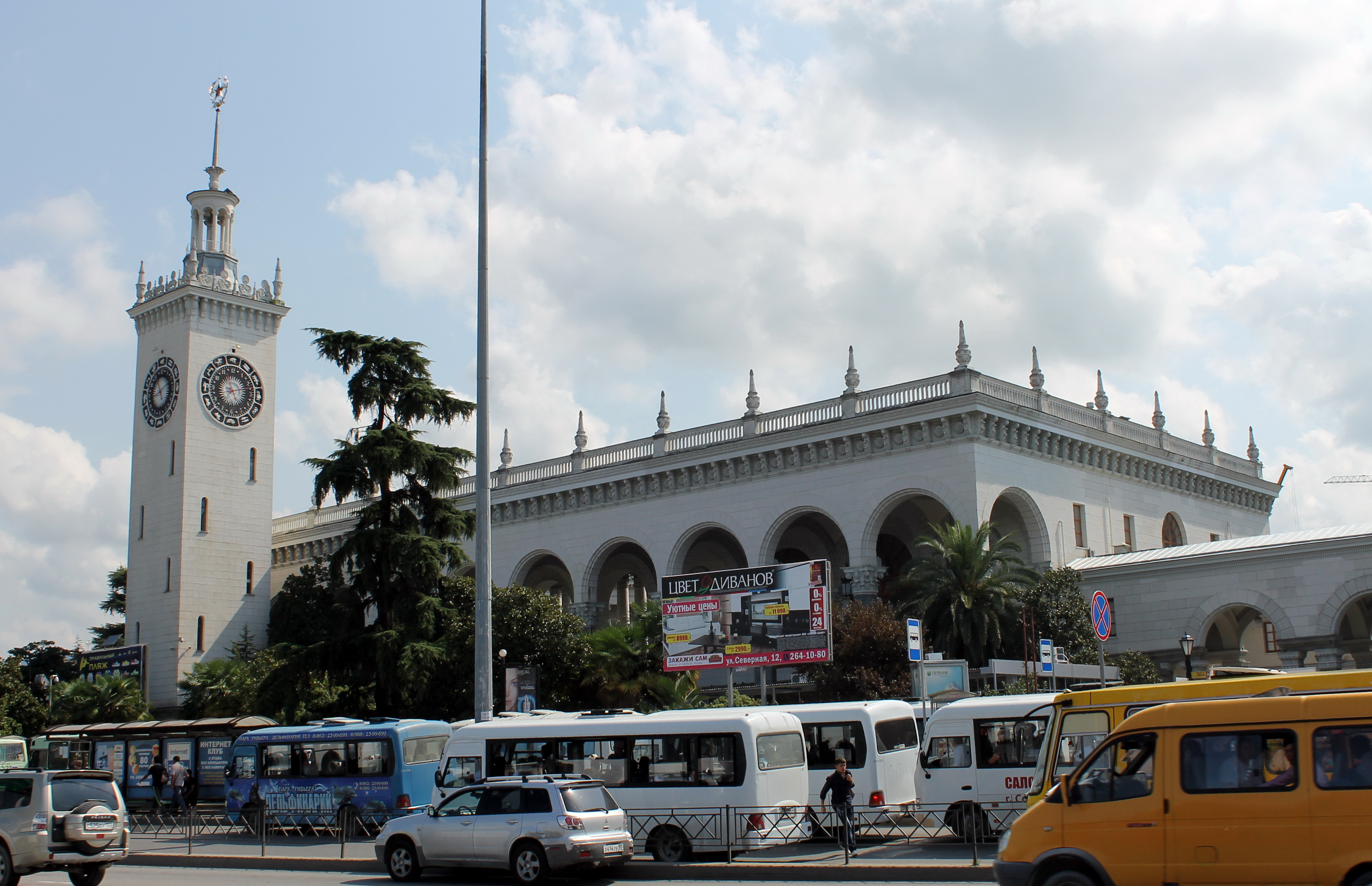
2012

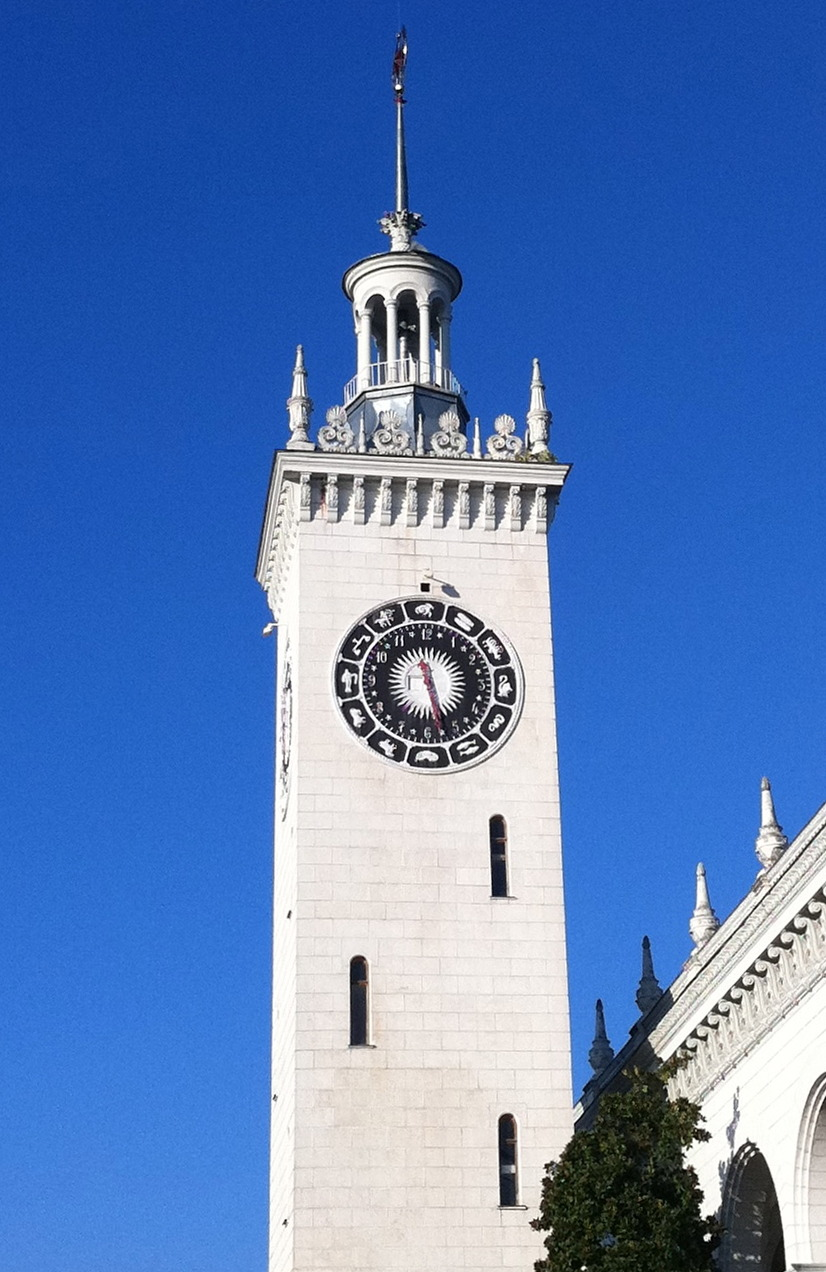
Clock tower
