= Shakhe =

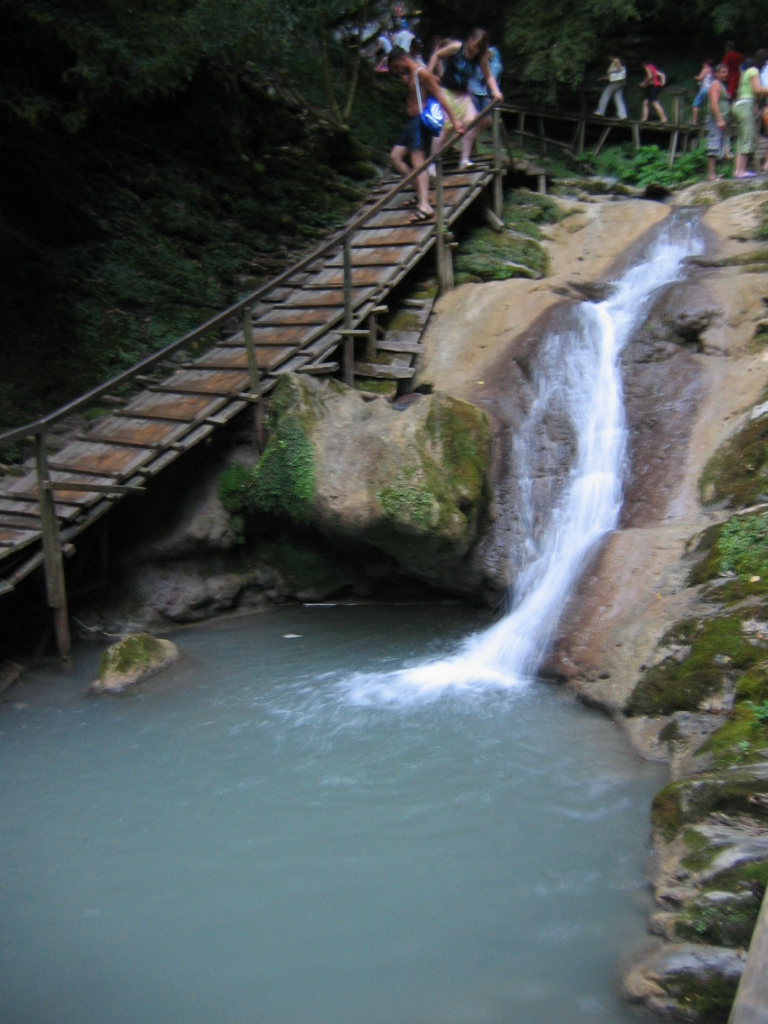

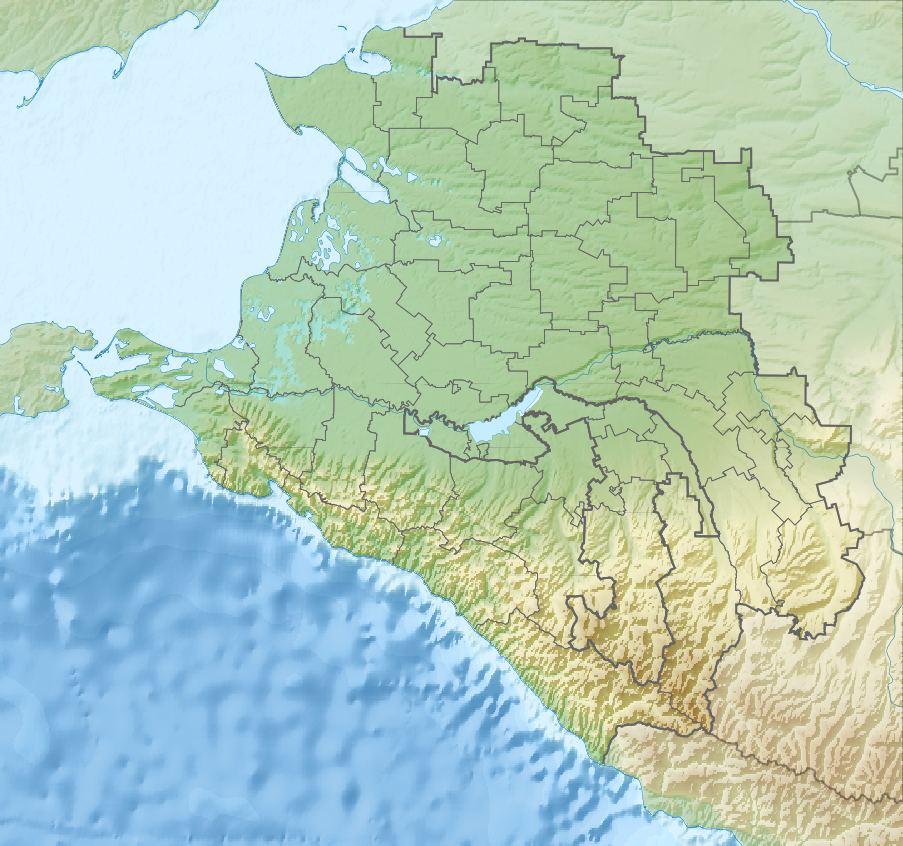
- Native name: Шахе (Russian)

Location
- Country: Russia

Physical characteristics
- Source
  - location: Greater Caucasus
- Mouth
  - location: Black Sea
  - coordinates: 43°47′19″N 39°27′50″E
  - elevation: 0 m (0 ft)
- Length: 59 km (37 mi)
- Basin size: 553 km^{2} (214 sq mi)

The Shakhe (Russian: Шахе; Adyghe: Шэхэ, Šèhè), also known as the Golovinka (Russian: Головинка) is a river in Khostinsky and Lazarevsky City Districts of the city of Sochi, Krasnodar Krai in Russia. It flows down the slopes of the Western Caucasus to the Black Sea. It is 59 kilometres (37 mi) long, and the area of its basin 553 square kilometres (214 sq mi). Its main tributary is the Bzych (left). The Shakhe is the second longest river of Sochi, next to the Mzymta.

Almost the whole course of the Shakhe, with the exception of its proximity to the sea, lies within Sochi National Park. The source of the river is in the mountains northwest of Krasnaya Polyana. The Shakhe flows northwest in a narrow valley, the first settlement downstream is Babuk-Aul where the river turns west. Downstream of Babuk-Aul it accepts the Azhu from the right and turns south. In the village of Bzogu it accepts the Bzych from the left and turns west. In the settlement of Bolshoy Kichmay the Shakhe turns southwest. The mouth of the river is in the settlement of Golovinka.

The drainage basin of the Shakhe is confined between the drainage basins of the Sochi (south) and the Psezuapse (north). A tiny part of the drainage basin belongs to the Caucasus Zapovednik.
