= Sochi (disambiguation) =

Sochi is a city in Krasnodar Krai, Russia.

Sochi may also refer to:

- Sochi River, a river in Krasnodar Krai, Russia
- Sochi International Airport, an airport in Sochi, Russia
- Sochi railway station, a railway station in Krasnodar Krai, Russia
- Port of Sochi, a Russian sea port on the Black Sea
- FC Sochi-04, former association football club based in Sochi, Russia
- PFC Sochi, a professional football club based in Sochi, Russia, former FC Dynamo Saint Petersburg
- HC Sochi, an ice hockey team based in Sochi, Russia

== See also ==
- Sochi Central Stadium, a multi-purpose stadium in Sochi, Russia
- 2014 Winter Olympics, XXII edition of the Winter Olympics held in Sochi, Russia
- 2014 Winter Paralympics, XI edition of the Winter Paralympics held in Sochi, Russia
- Sochi bid for the 2014 Winter Olympics
- Soshi (disambiguation)
