= Orekhovsky =

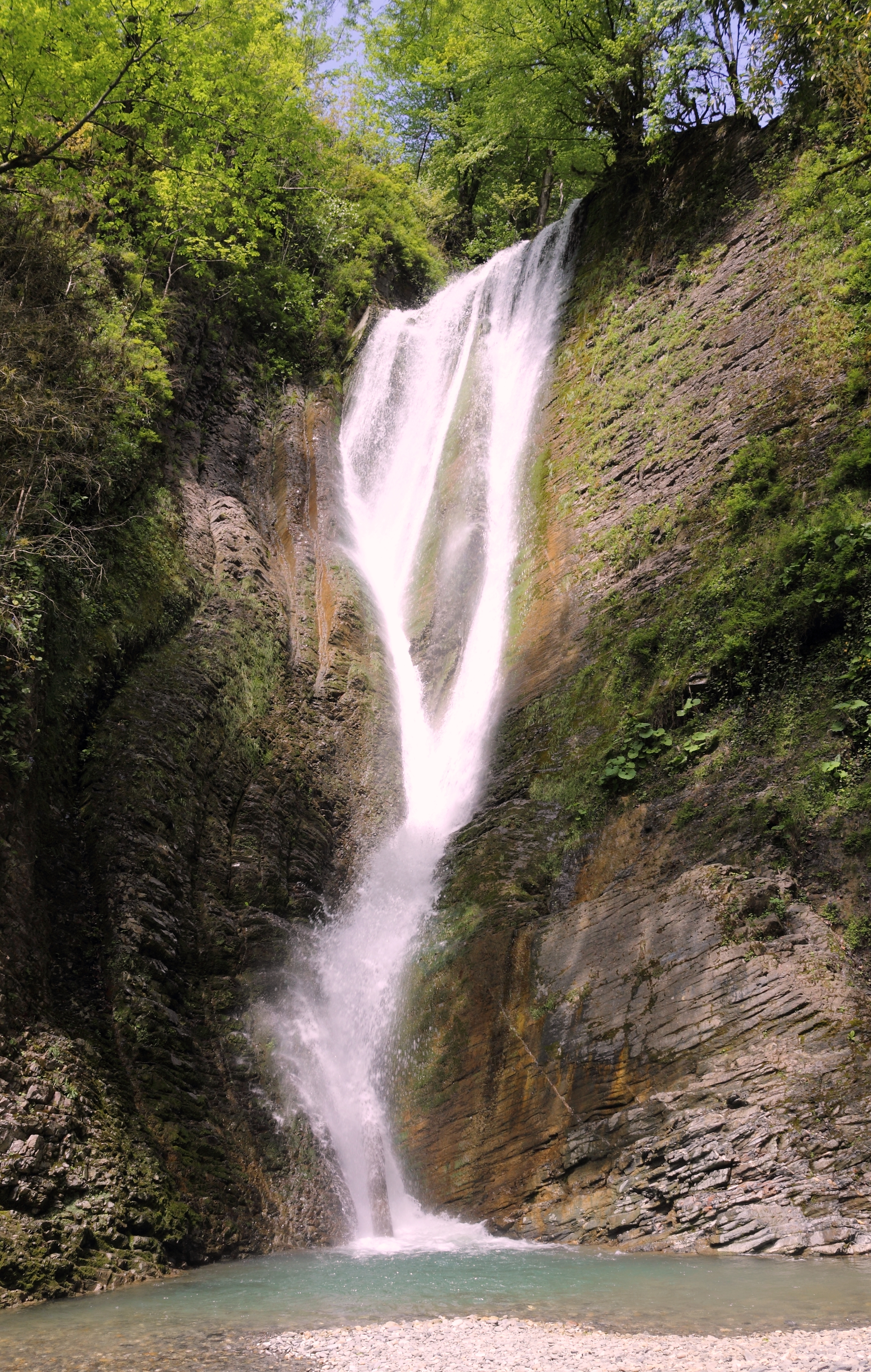

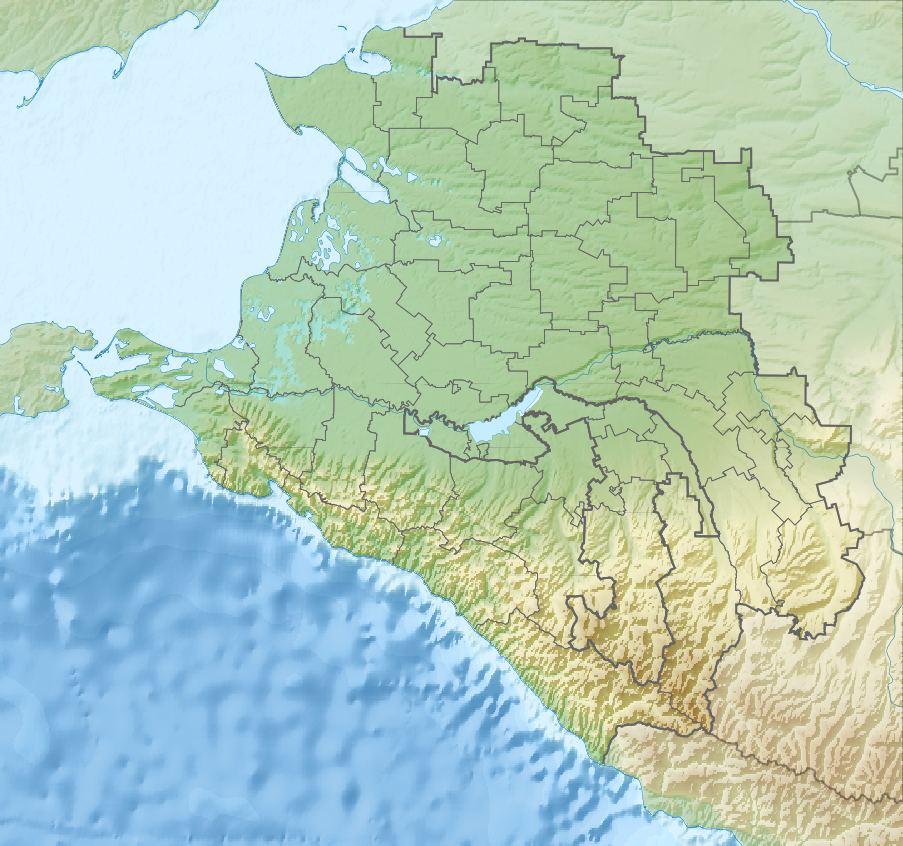
- Location within Krasnodar Krai Location within Caucasus Mountains Location within Russia
- Coordinates: 43°42′26″N 39°46′27″E

The Orekhovsky (Ореховский (Russian)) is a waterfall in the Sochi National Park. It takes its name from Orekhovka, a settlement in the Khosta District of Sochi. It is located on the Bezumenka stream at its confluence with the Sochi River. Orekhovsky is the second highest waterfall in the city, with a height of 27.5 meters. In the early 20th century, it was known as Melnichny ("the miller's fall"). Nearby is a grove of walnuts and rhododendron.

== Other Sochi waterfalls ==
- Ivanovsky
- Polikarya

== See also ==
- List of waterfalls
