= Soshi =

Soshi may refer to:

- Soshi Tanaka (born 1982), Japanese figure skater
- Okita Sōji (1842 or 1844–1868), also referred to as Okita Soshi, swordsman of the Shinsengumi
- Girls' Generation, or SoShi, a South Korean girl group

== See also ==
- Omoro Sōshi, a compilation of ancient poems and songs from Okinawa and the Amami Islands
- Sochi (disambiguation)
