= Sochi (river) =

Coordinates: 43°35′00″N 39°42′53″E

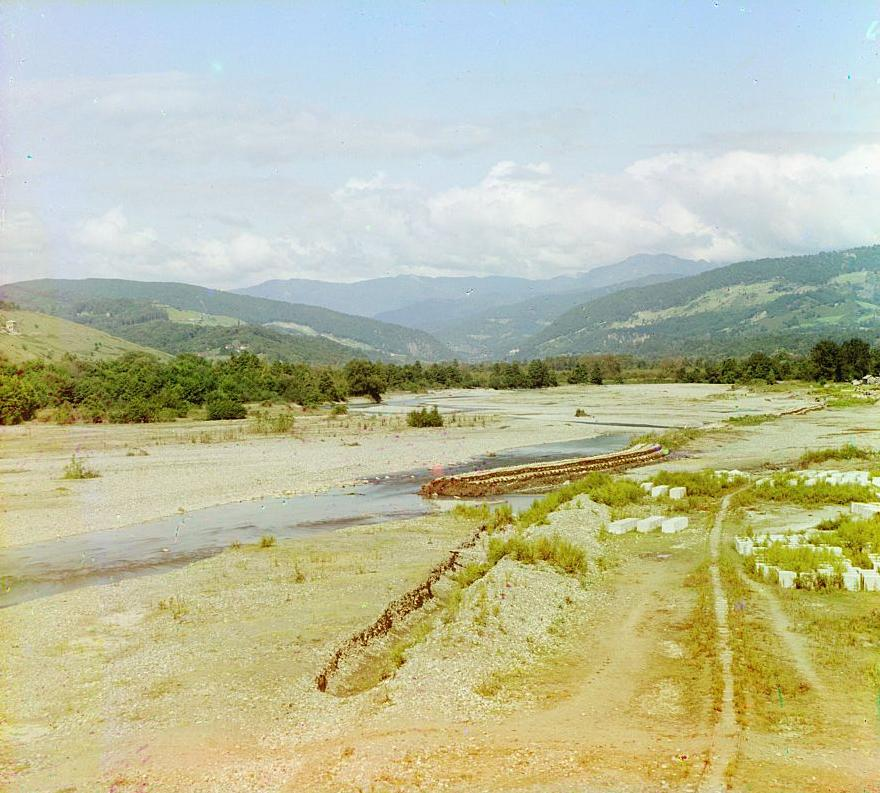
- Photograph of the Sochi River circa 1905-1915 by Sergey Prokudin-Gorsky

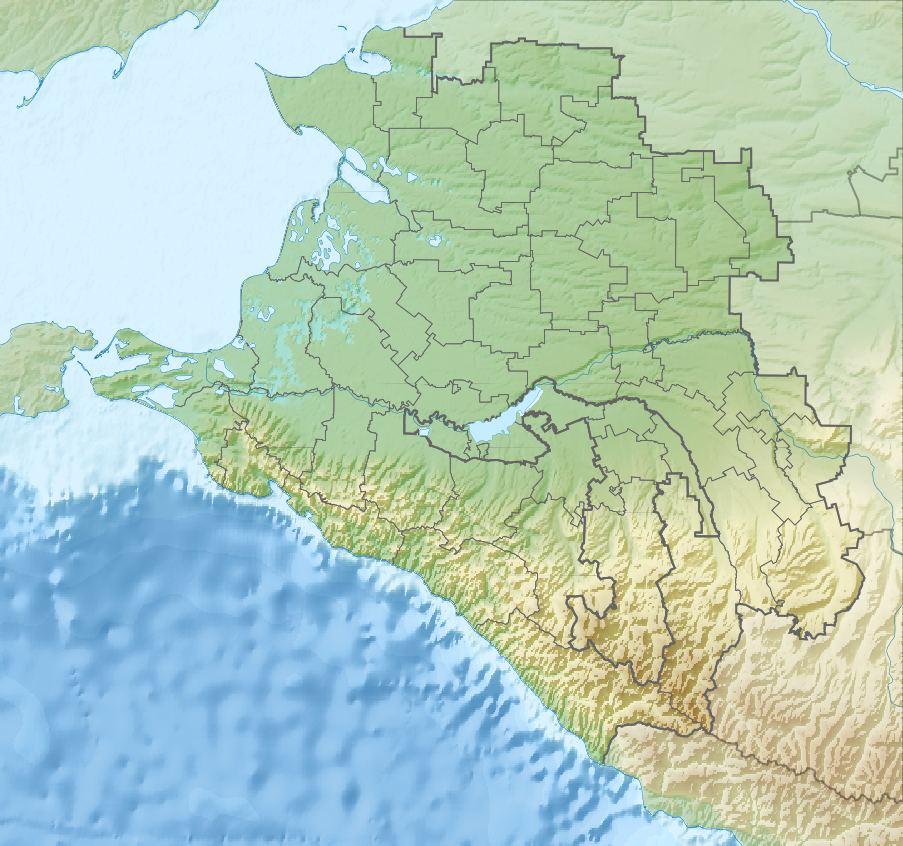
- Native name: Сочи (Russian)

Location
- Country: Russia

Physical characteristics
- Mouth
  - location: Black Sea
- Length: 45 km (28 mi)
- Basin size: 296 square kilometres (114 mi^{2})

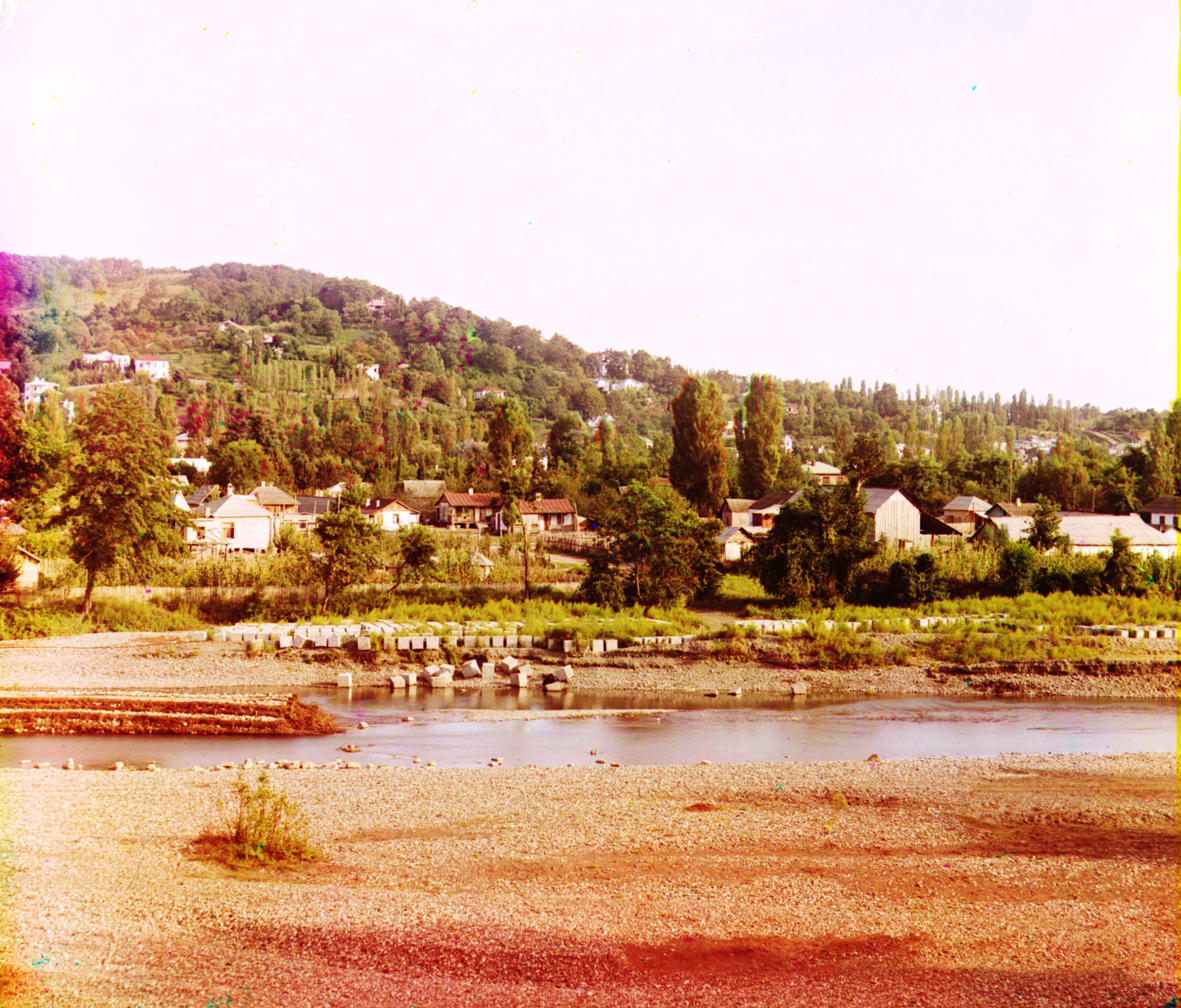
View of the Sochi River and Sochi from the west. Photograph by Sergey Prokudin-Gorsky circa 1905–1915

The Sochi (Russian: Сочи, from Ubykh: Шъуача, lit. seaside) is a river in the city of Sochi in Krasnodar Krai, Russia. It is 45 kilometres (28 mi) long, and the area of its basin is 296 square kilometres (114 sq mi).

Originating at Bolshaya Shura Mountain in the Greater Caucasus Mountains, it flows southwest and enters the Black Sea at Sochi, itself named for the river and the site of the 2014 Winter Olympic Games. It is the third longest river in Sochi after the Mzymta and the Shakhe. Administratively, the valley of the river belongs to the Khostinsky city district of the city of Sochi, except for the lowest part, which belongs to the Tsentralny city district. The upper course of the Sochi lies within the Caucasus Nature Reserve, a World Heritage Site, whereas the middle course, down to Plastunka, lies within Sochi National Park.

The Sochi River begins on the southern slopes of the 2,250-metre (7,380 ft) Bolshaya Shura Mountain and flows toward the west-southwest through mountainous terrain and is joined by tributaries such as the Ushkho and the Ats along the way. About 15 kilometres (9 mi) before its end at Sochi proper, the Sochi River is joined by its main tributary, the Agva. Just beyond is the site of the scenic Orekhovka Falls, where the Bezumenka River flows into the Sochi River at Nizhnaya-Orekhovka.

The Sochi River then turns southward and flows through the suburbs of Plastunka, Baranovka, and Navaginka before reaching the city centre of Sochi, where it is contained by concrete embankments before it enters the Black Sea.
