= Western Caucasus =

Western region of the Caucasus in Southern Russia

UNESCO World Heritage Site
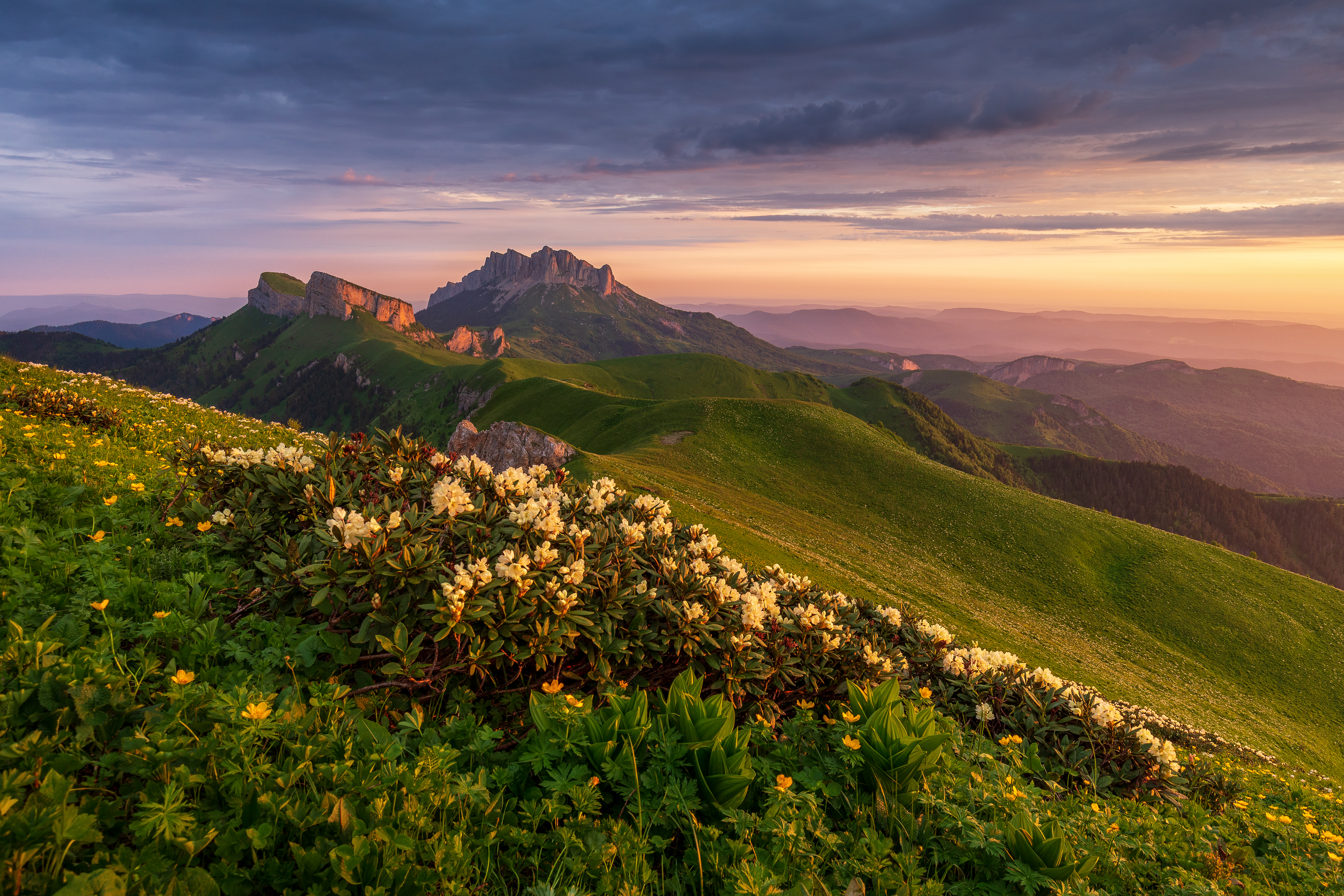

- Location within Krasnodar Krai Location within European Russia
- Location: Krasnodar Region, Russia
- Criteria: Natural: (ix), (x)
- Reference: 900
- Inscription: 1999 (23rd Session)
- Area: 298,903 ha (738,610 acres)
- Coordinates: 44°N 40°E

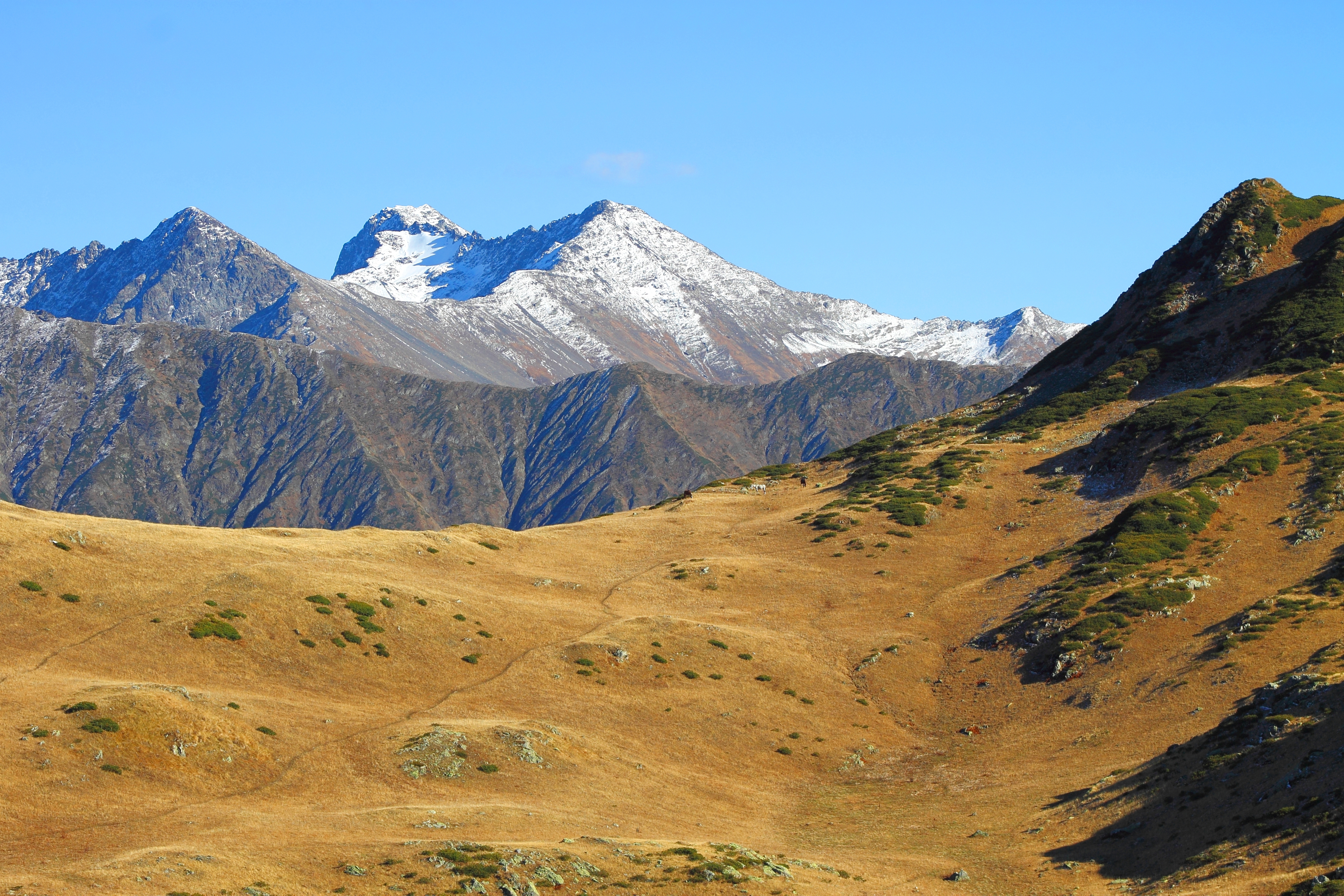
The Western Caucasus as seen from peak Tabunnaya near Krasnaya Polyana

The Western Caucasus is a western region of the North Caucasus in Southern Russia, extending from the Black Sea to Mount Elbrus.

== World Heritage Site ==
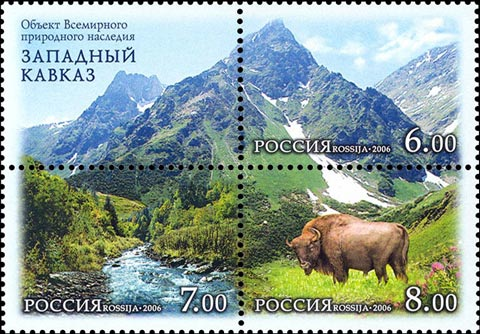
Western Caucasus on se-tenant postage stamps of Russia, 2006

The Western Caucasus includes a natural UNESCO World Heritage Site (named Western Caucasus), comprising the extreme western edge of the Caucasus Mountains. UNESCO specialists say that it is the only large mountain area in Europe that has not experienced significant human impact and has large areas of undisturbed mountain forest. Its habitats are exceptionally varied for such a small area, ranging from lowlands to glaciers. It is situated 50 km north of the resort of Sochi. The site includes the whole Caucasus Nature Reserve with the exception of the Khosta Yew-Box Grove and including the whole Lago-Naki plateau.

== Biosphere Reserve ==
The Western Caucasus also contains the Caucasus Nature Reserve (IUCN management category Ia) set up by the Soviet government in Krasnodar Krai, Adygea and Karachay–Cherkessia in 1924 to preserve some 85 m-high specimens of the Nordmann fir (Abies nordmanniana), thought to be the tallest trees in Europe, and a unique forest formed by English yew (Taxus baccata) and European box (Buxus sempervirens) within the city of Sochi.

About a third of its high mountain species of plants are recognized as endemic. The area also includes the Sochi National Park (IUCN management category II) with a Persian leopard reintroduction centre.

The Western Caucasus is also the place of origin and of reintroduction of the Caucasian wisent. The last wild wisent in the world was killed by poachers here in 1927. Wisents partly interbred with American bison were reintroduced several decades later.

== Gallery ==
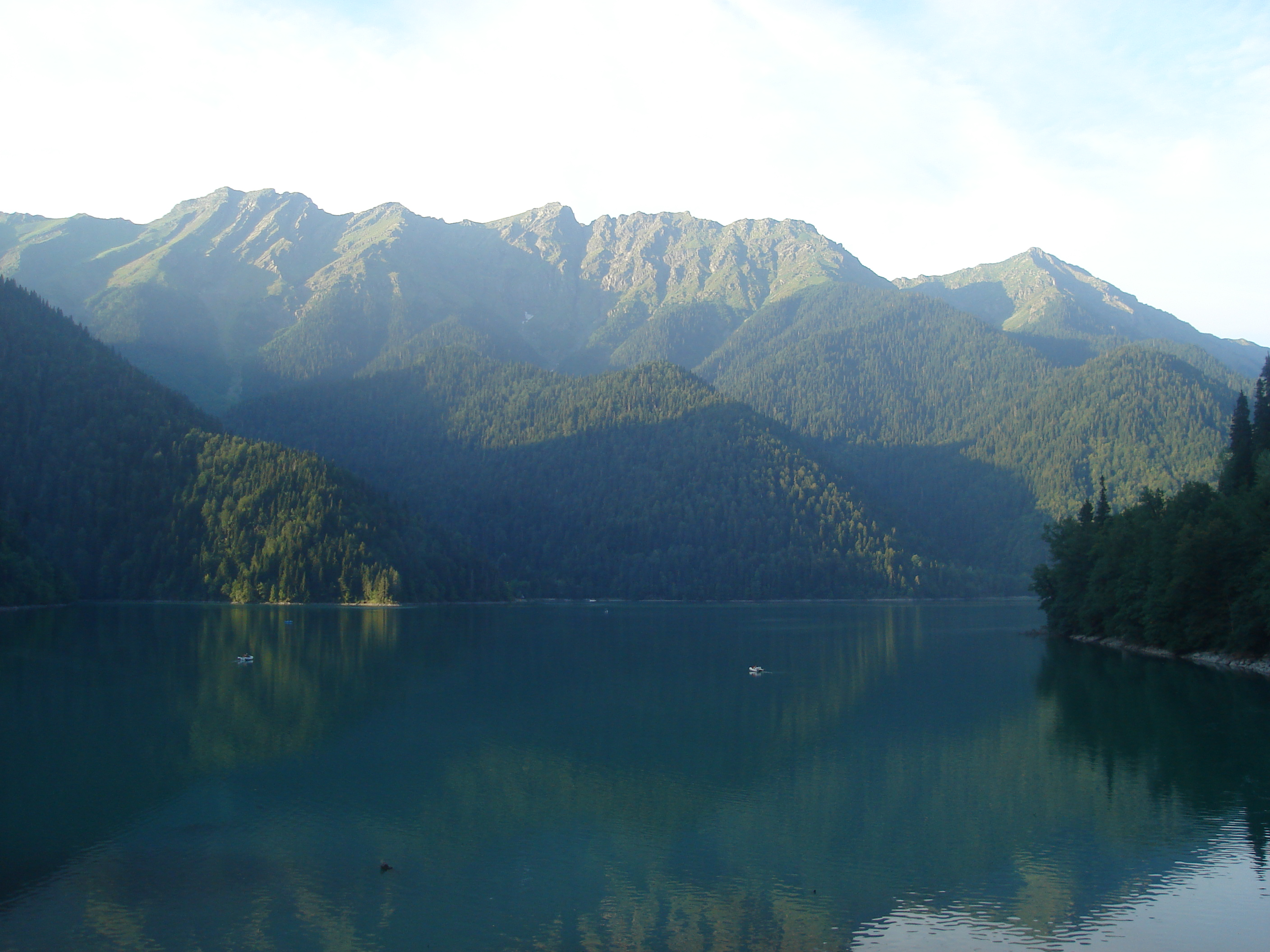
Lake Ritsa.

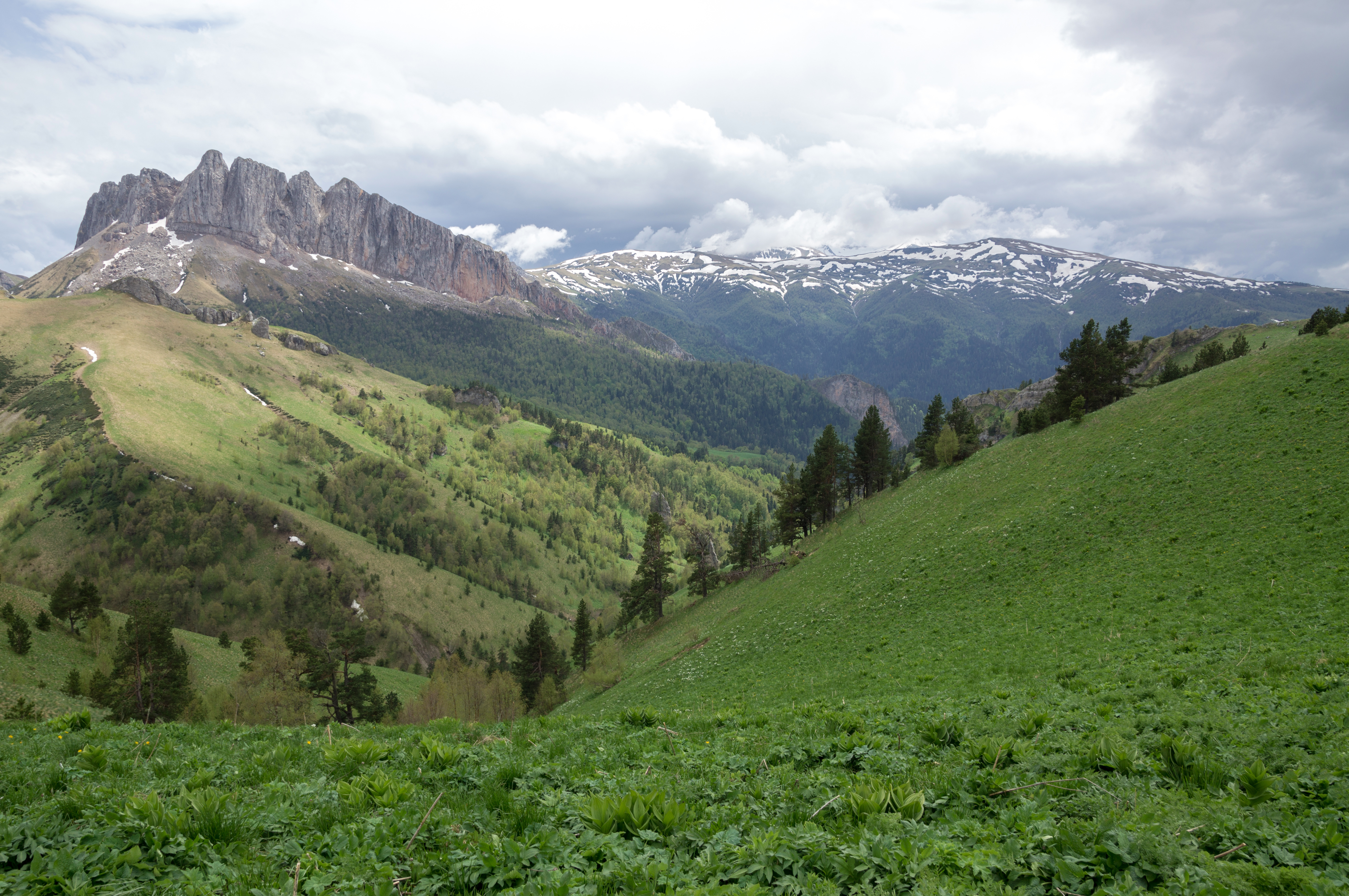
Acheshbok massif.

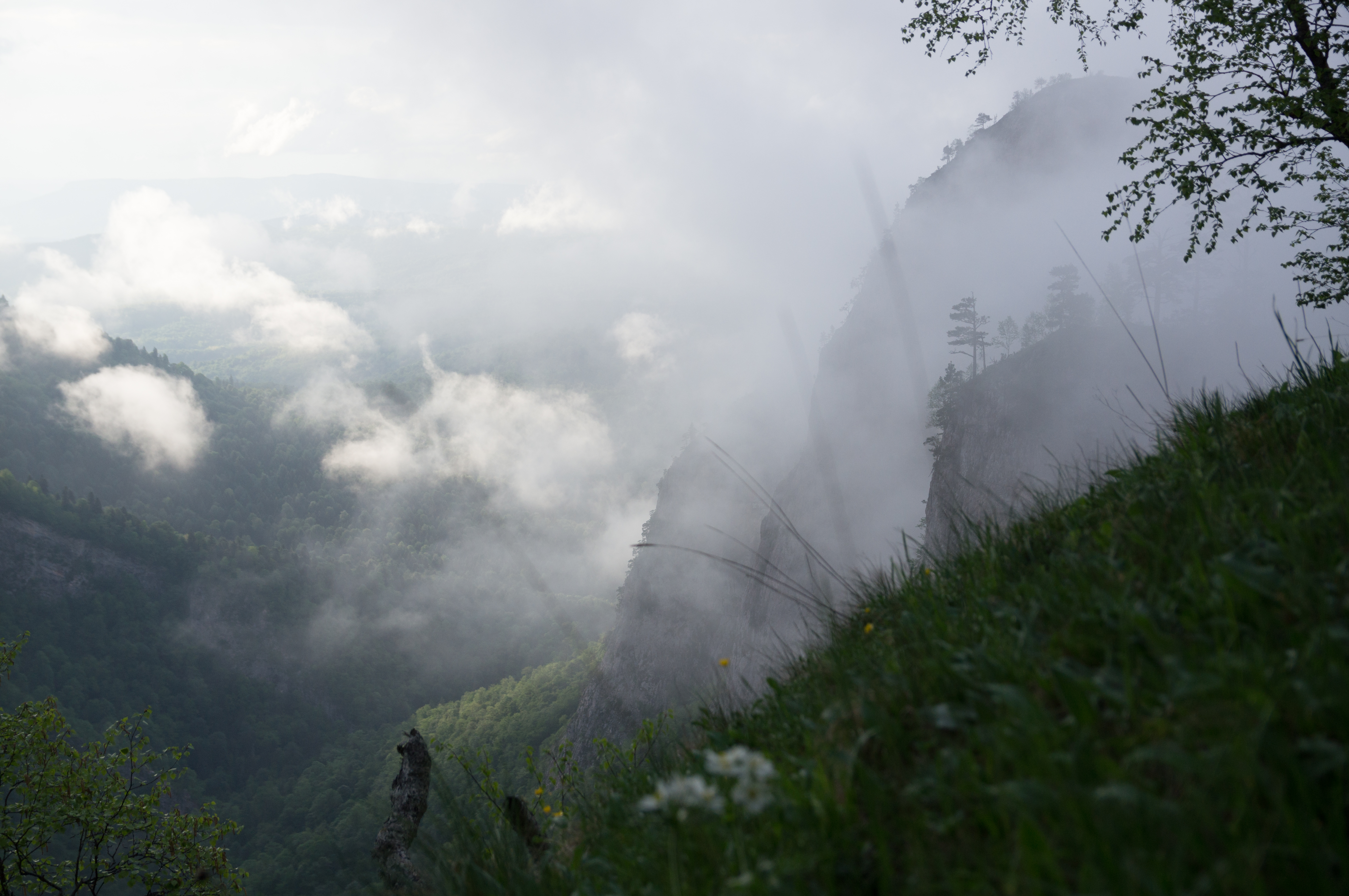
Khodz river headwaters.

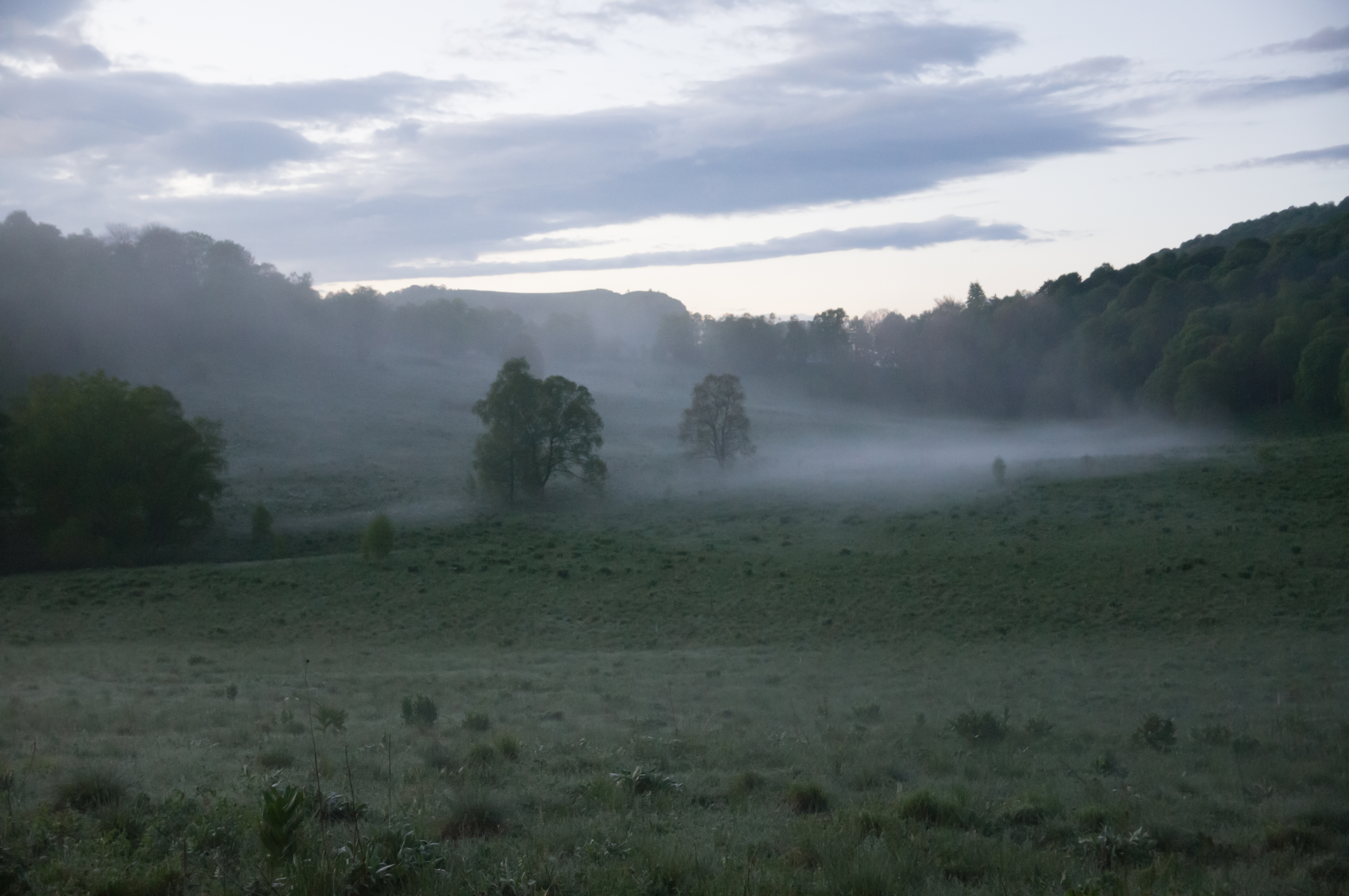
Early dawn in Khodz river canyon.

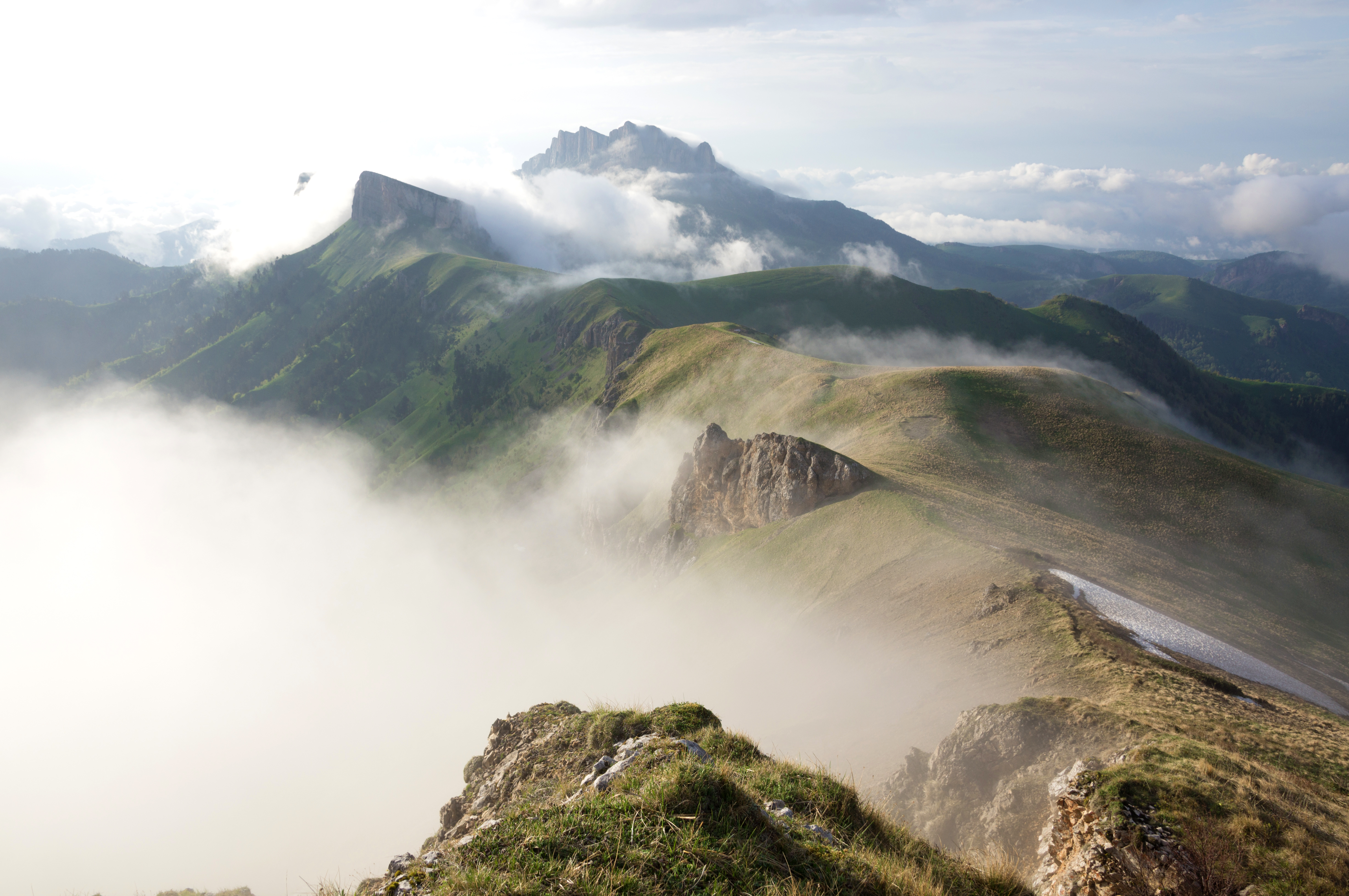
Tkhach mountain in clouds.

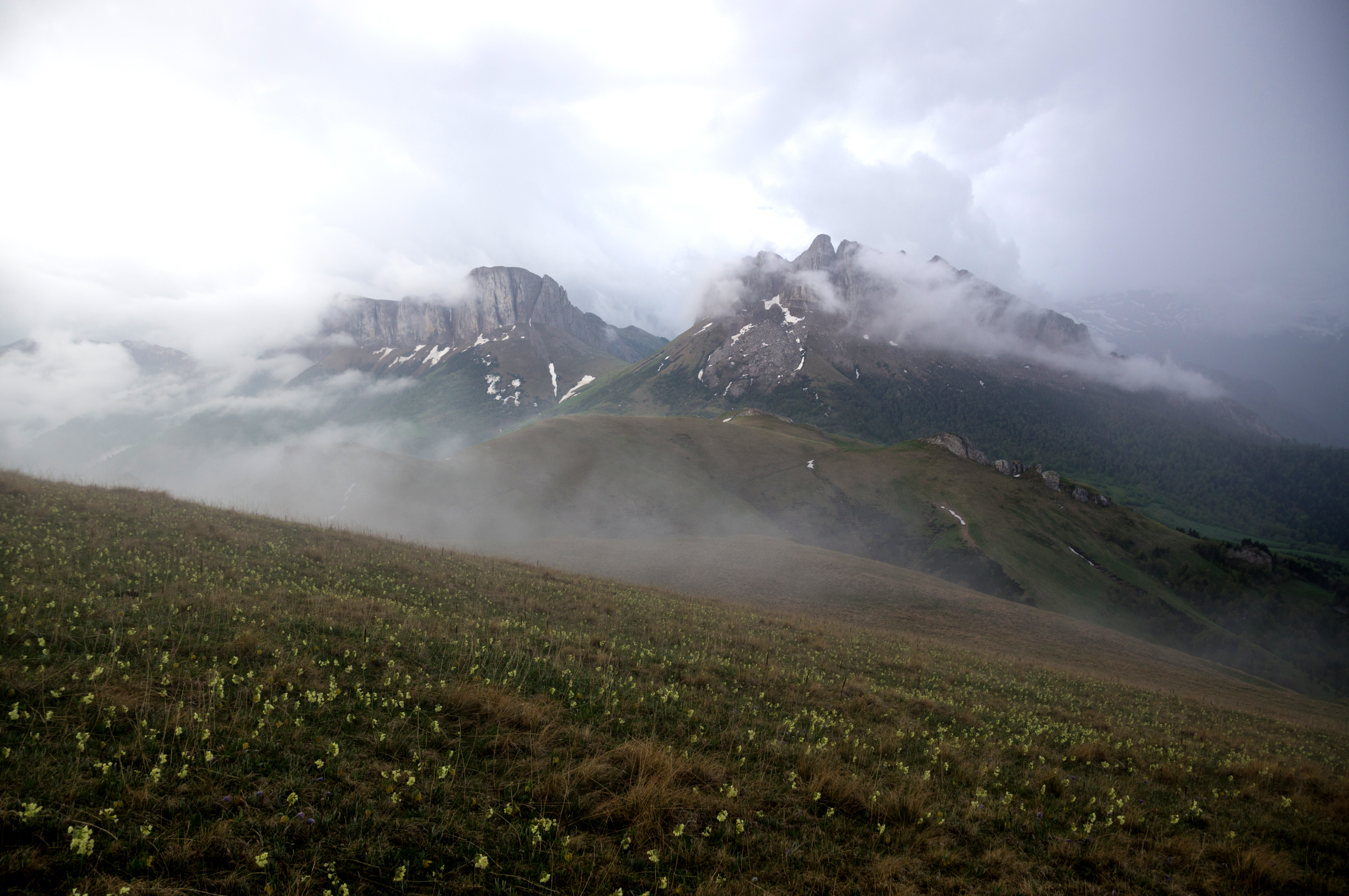
Acheshbok mountain in clouds.

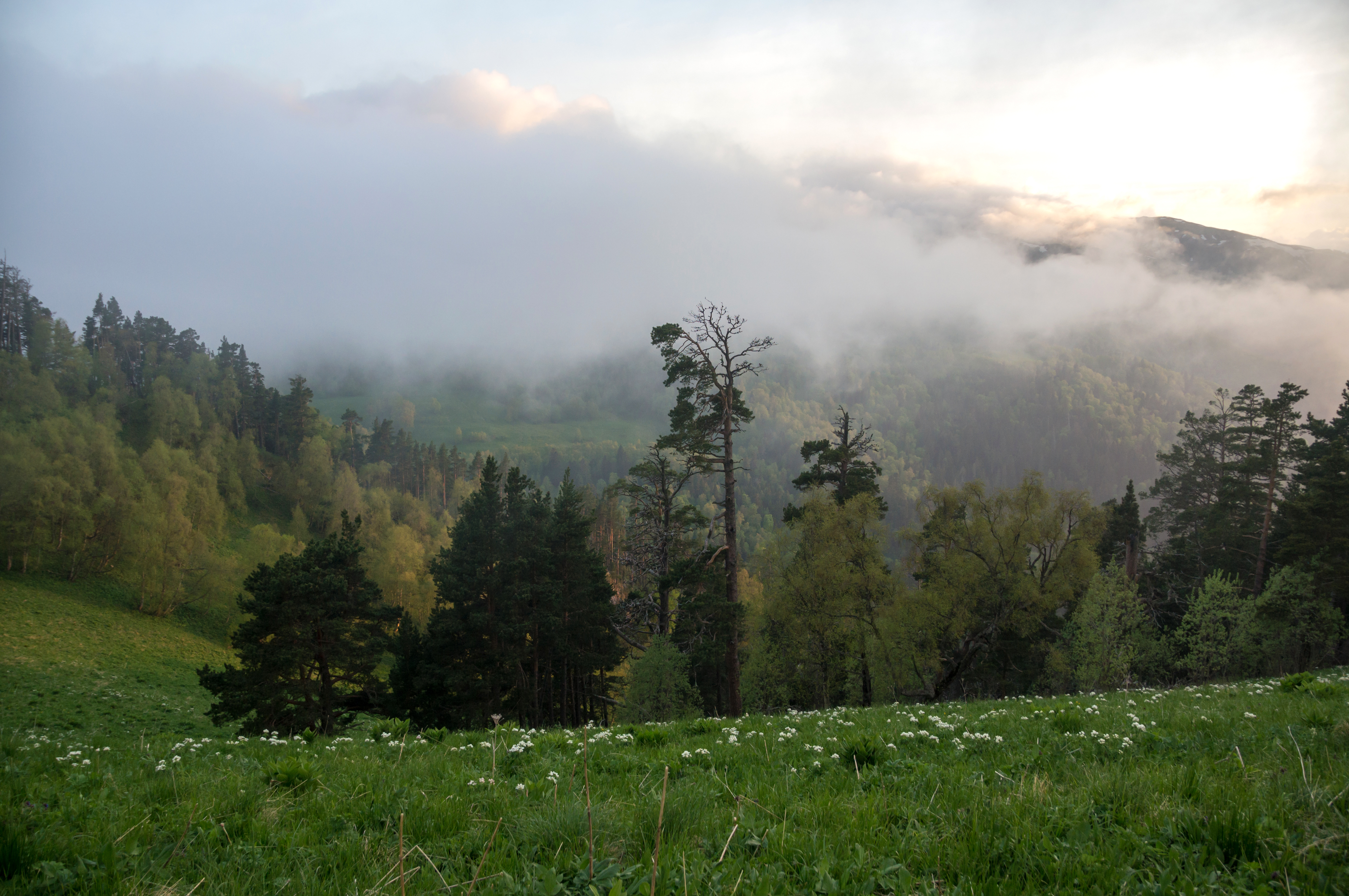
Southern slopes of Acheshbok.

== See also ==
- Caucasus mixed forests
- Kuban
