= Polikarya =

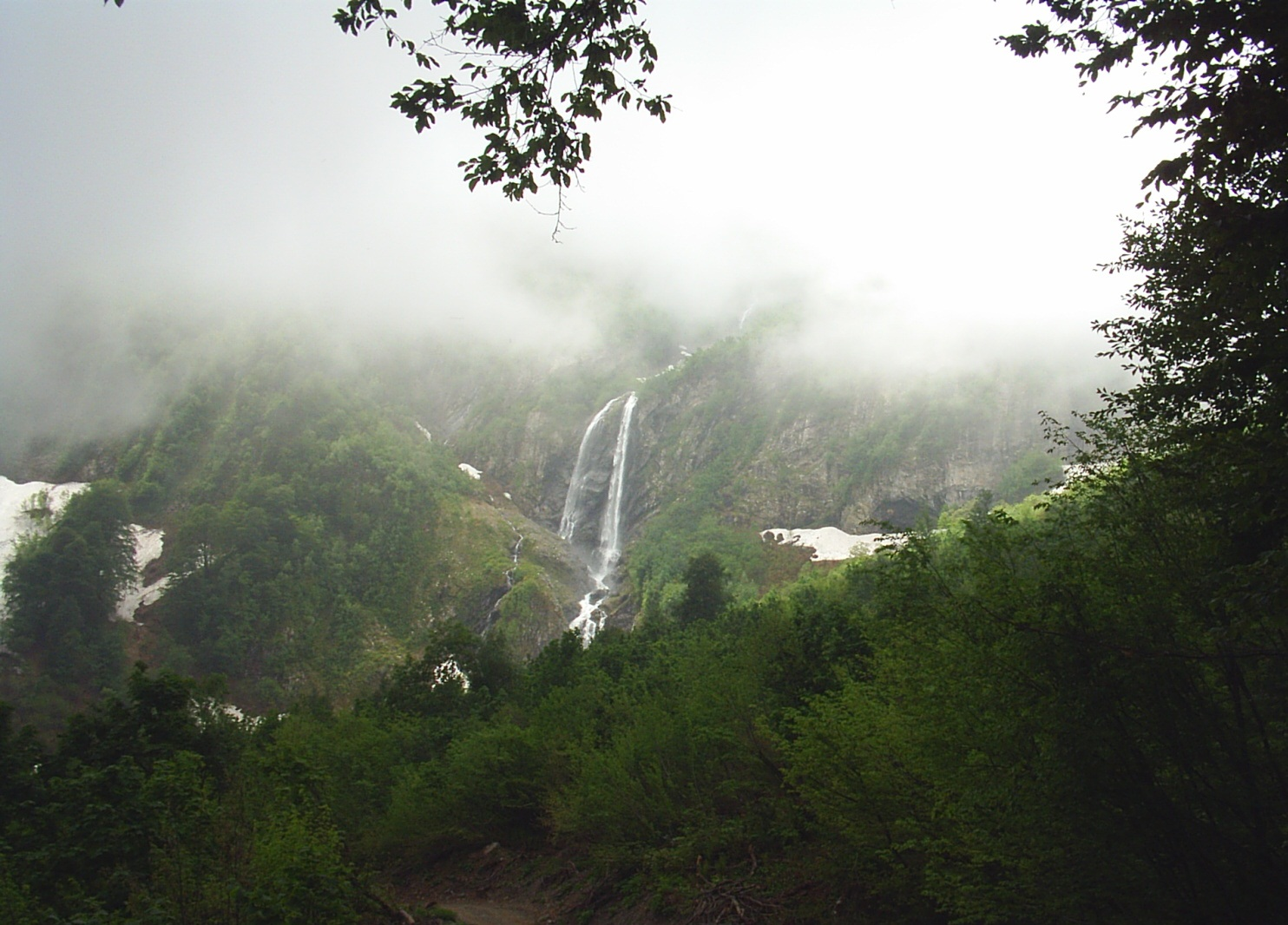

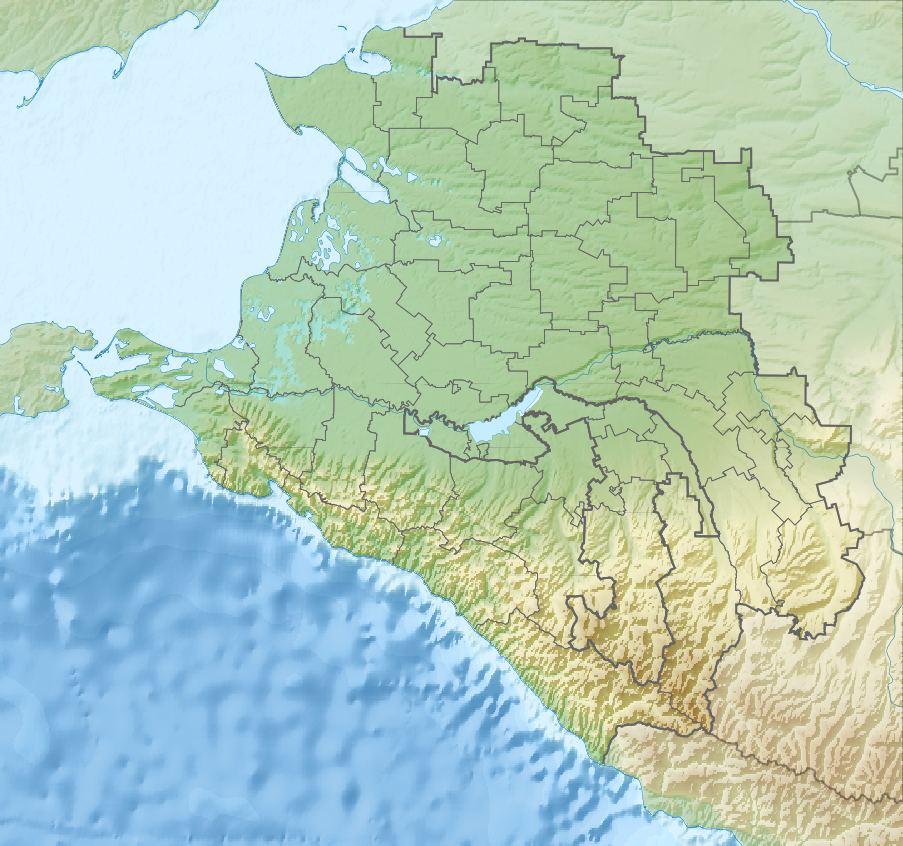
- Location within Krasnodar Krai Location within Caucasus Mountains Location within Russia
- Coordinates: 43°39′06″N 40°16′16″E

The Polikarya (Поликаря (Russian)) is the highest waterfall in Sochi, Russia. It is fed by one of the glaciers of the Aibga Ridge. Even in June, the slope is covered with snow. The waterfall is located in the Adlersky District not far from Krasnaya Polyana. It is part of the Sochi National Park. Its height is 70 metres.

== Other Sochi waterfalls ==
- Ivanovsky
- Orekhovsky

== See also ==
- List of waterfalls
