= Ivanovsky Waterfall =

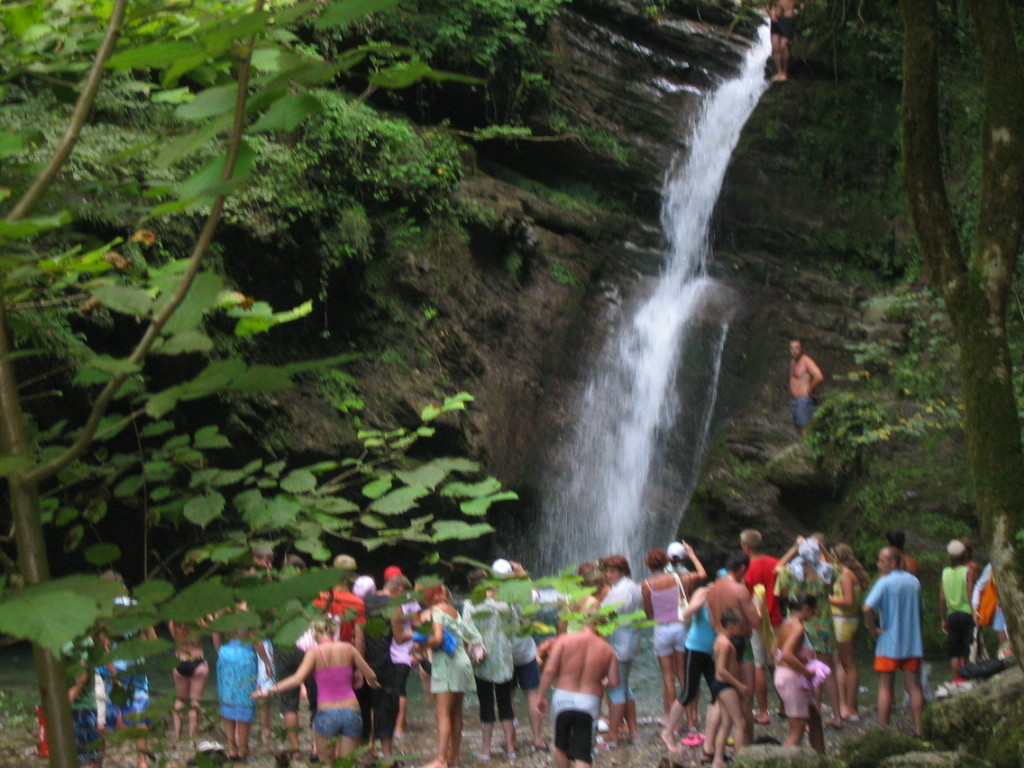

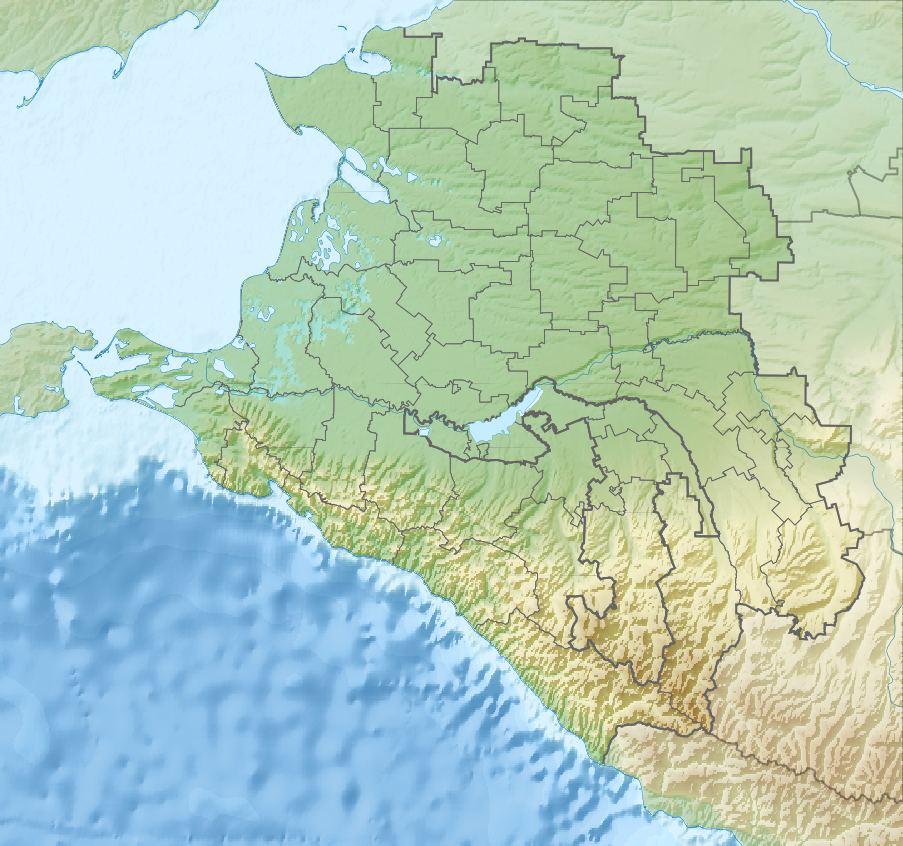
- Location within Krasnodar Krai Location within Caucasus Mountains Location within Russia
- Coordinates: 43°36′31″N 39°58′46″E

The Ivanovsky (Ивановский) is a 10-metre high waterfall that is located in the Sochi National Park, Russia. It is part of the Psakho River. Just below the waterfall is a small cool lake. In summertime, the waterfall is frequented by tourists.

== Other Sochi waterfalls ==
- Orekhovsky
- Polikarya

== See also ==
- List of waterfalls
