= Sochi National Park =

National park of Russia

- Russian: Сочинский (Also: Sochinsky)
- IUCN category II (national park)
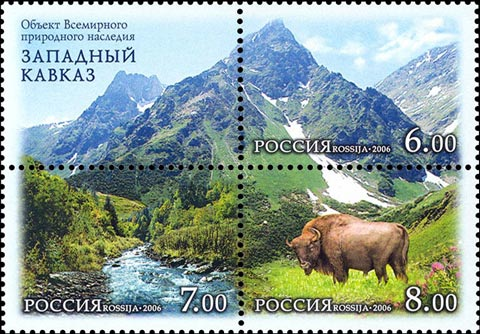
- European Bison, in Sochi NP

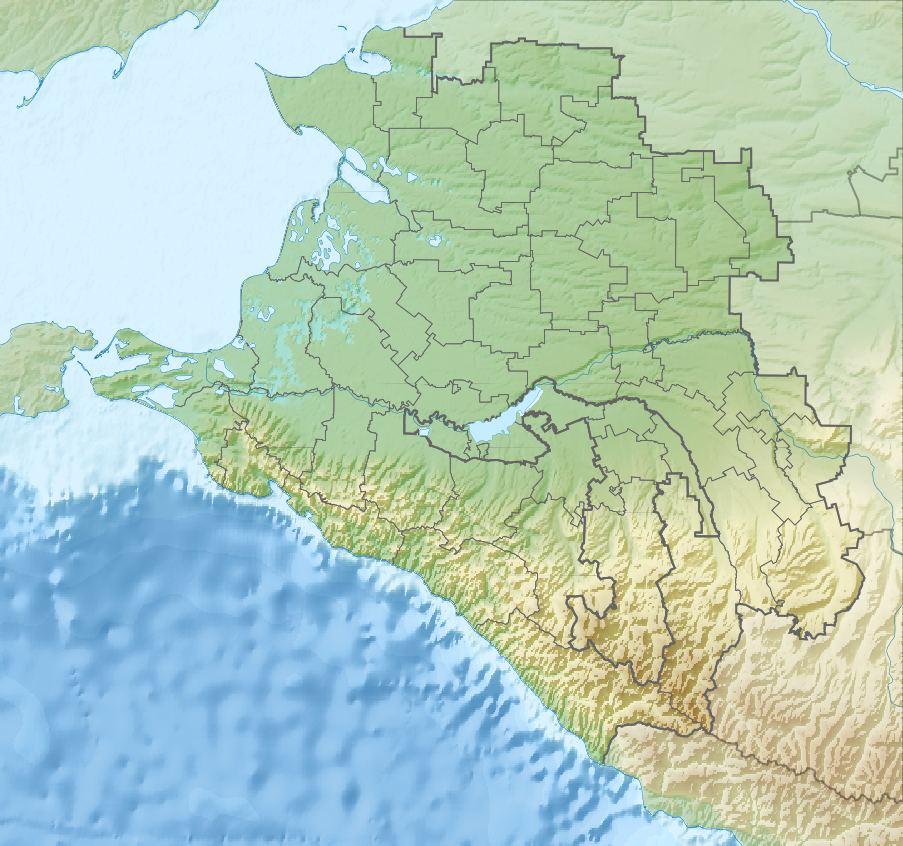
- Location within Krasnodar Krai Location within Russia
- Location: Krasnodar Krai
- Nearest city: Sochi
- Area: 193,737 hectares (478,735 acres; 748 sq mi)
- Established: 1983
- Governing body: Ministry of Natural Resources and Environment (Russia)
- Website: https://npsochi.ru/

Sochi National Park (Russian: Сочинский национальный парк, also Sochinsky National Park) is Russia's oldest national park, established on May 5, 1983. It is located in the Western Caucasus, near the city of Sochi, in Southern Russia.

== Topography ==
Sochi National Park covers 1,937 square kilometres (748 sq mi) within the Western Caucasus World Heritage Site. The park occupies the Greater Sochi area, from the border with the Tuapsinsky District, between the mouths of Shepsi River and Magri River in the north-west, to the border with Abkhazia along the Psou River in the south-east, and between the Black Sea to the water divide crest of the Greater Caucasus. Immediately to the north is the Caucasus Nature Reserve. The park does not include areas of settlement, such as the city of Sochi and various urban and rural settlements, nor the area of the Caucasian Biosphere Reserve.

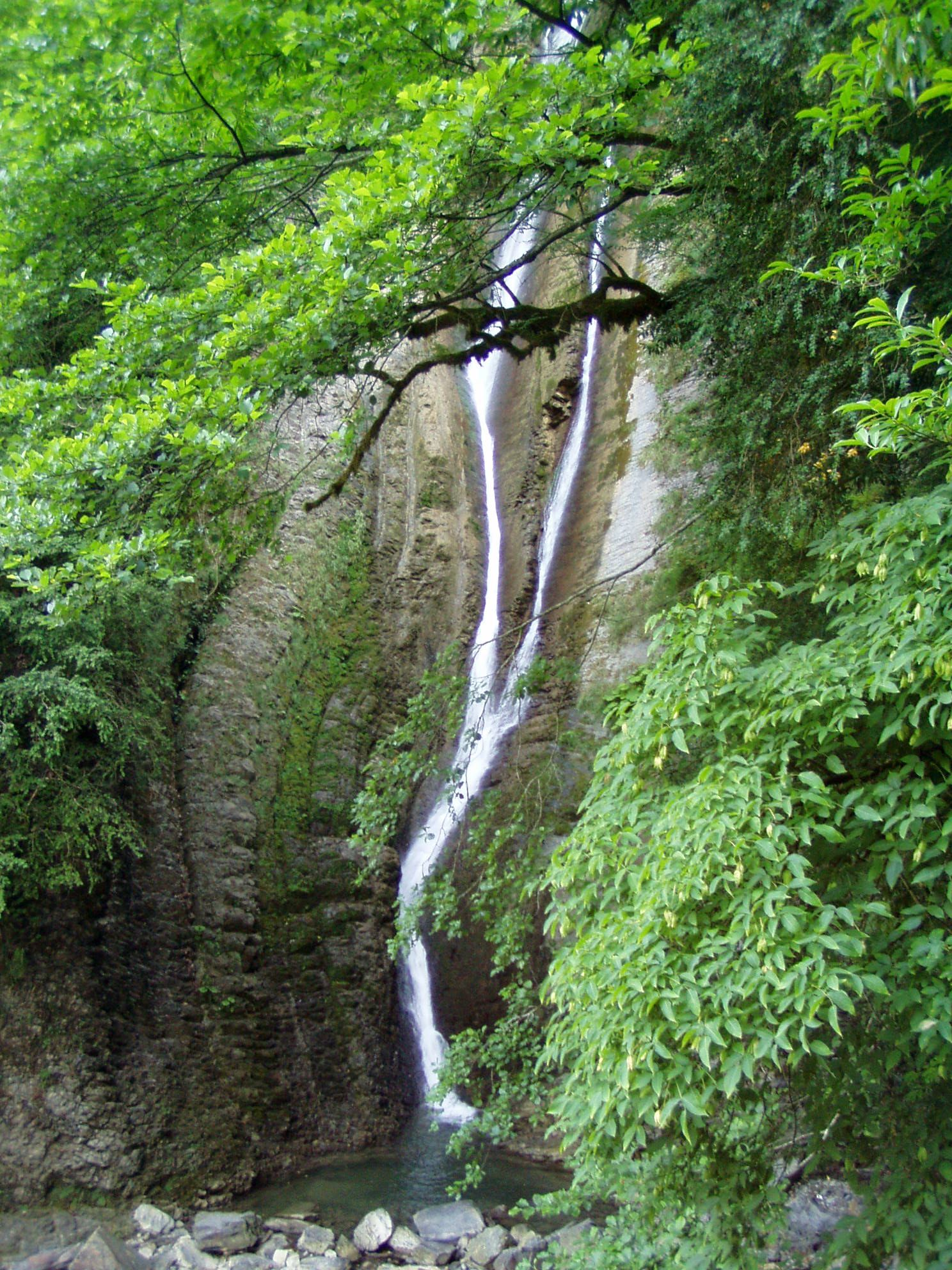
Notable waterfalls include Agura, Orekhovsky, Ivanovsky, and Polikarya, as well as the Valley of 33 Falls

== Persian leopard re-introduction ==
In 2009, a Persian Leopard Breeding and Rehabilitation Centre was created in Sochi National Park, where two male leopards from Turkmenistan have been kept since September 2009. Additionally, two female Persian leopards from Iran have been kept since May 2010. Their descendants will be released into the wild in the Caucasus Biosphere Reserve. Once widespread in the mountainous region sandwiched by the Black and Caspian Seas, the Persian leopard population fell drastically amid poaching and habitat loss in the 20th century. In 2012, a pair of Persian leopards were brought to the Sochi National park from Portugal's Lisbon Zoo. In July 2013, the pair had a litter, the first Persian leopard cubs known to be born in Russia in 50 years. The cubs will be released into the wild after learning survival skills from their parents, according to Natalia Dronova, the WWF-Russia species coordinator.

== See also ==
- Caucasus mixed forests
- Caucasian Wisent
- National parks of Russia
- Nature reserves of Russia (zapovedniks)
