= Caucasus Nature Reserve =

Nature reserve in Krasnodar Krai, Russia

- Russian: Кавказский государственный природный биосферный заповедник имени Х. Г. Шапошникова (Also: Caucasus, Kavkasky)
- IUCN category Ia (strict nature reserve)
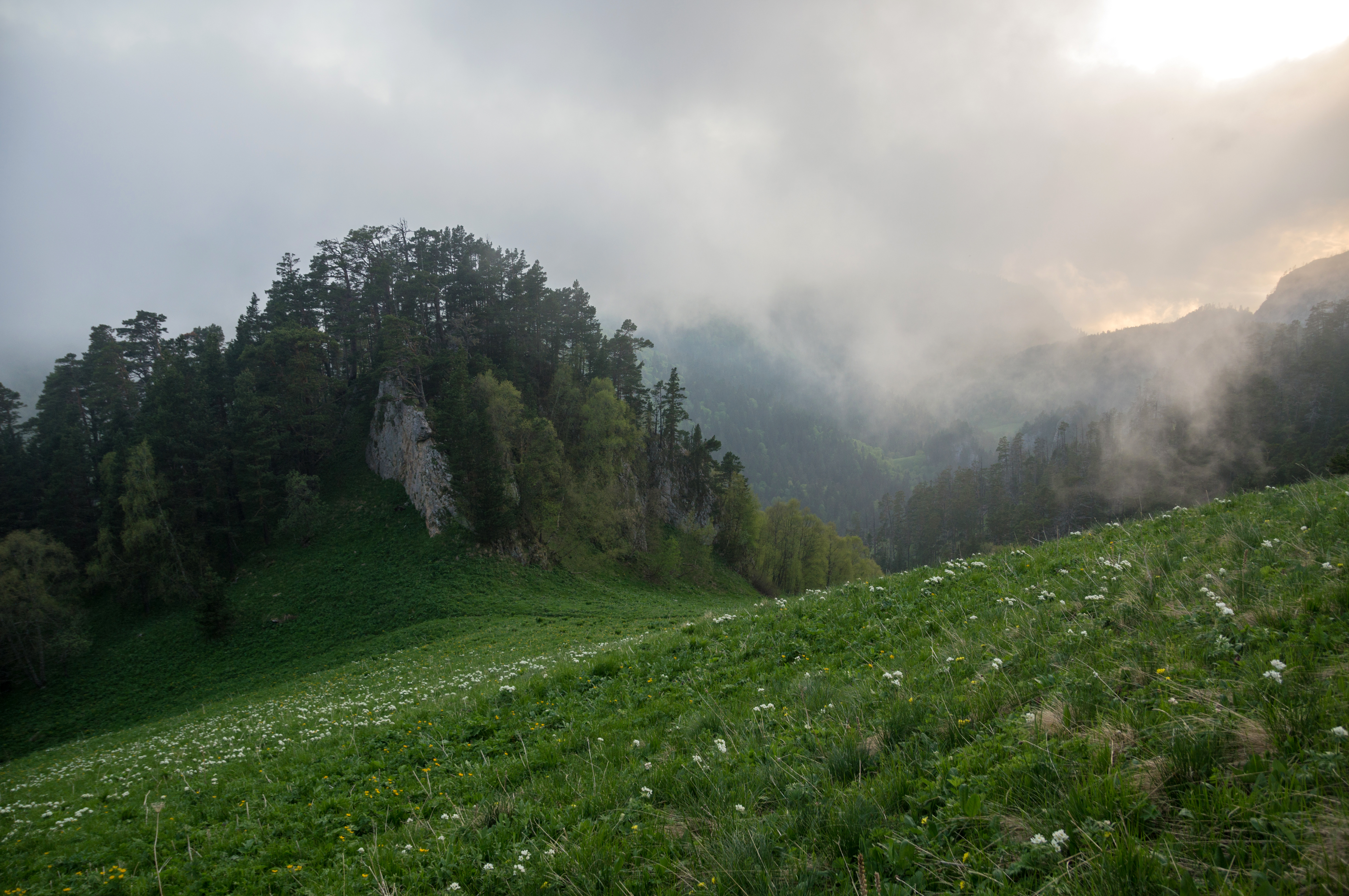
- Caucasus Zapovednik

- Location within Russia
- Location: Krasnodar Krai
- Nearest city: Sochi
- Coordinates: 43°50′10″N 40°24′3″E
- Area: 280,335 ha (2,803 km^{2}; 1,082 mi^{2})
- Established: 1924
- Governing body: Ministry of Natural Resources and Environment (Russia)
- Website: http://kgpbz.ru/

Caucasus Nature Reserve (Note: Russian: Кавказский государственный природный биосферный заповедник имени Х. Г. Шапошникова; also Caucasus or Kavkasky.) is a Russian zapovednik (strict ecological reserve) covering a heavily mountainous section of the Northwest Caucasus Mountains. It is the largest and oldest in the territory of specially protected natural area in the Caucasus, having been created in 1924 as the Caucasian Bison Reserve. In 1979, the site was named a UNESCO Biosphere Reserve, and in 1999 included in a UNESCO World Heritage Site. In 2008 it was officially renamed after Khachatur (Christopher) G. Shaposhnikova the biologist who founded the reserve. The area is situated in the Mostovsky District of Krasnodar Krai, covering an area of 280,335 ha (2,803.35 km^{2}; 1,082.38 mi^{2}).

== Topography ==
The Caucasus Reserve protects mountainous terrain. It is bounded on the south by Sochi National Park and the ridge of the Caucasus bordering on the Georgia (Abkhazia). Altitudes range from 260 to 3,360 m (850 to 11,020 ft).

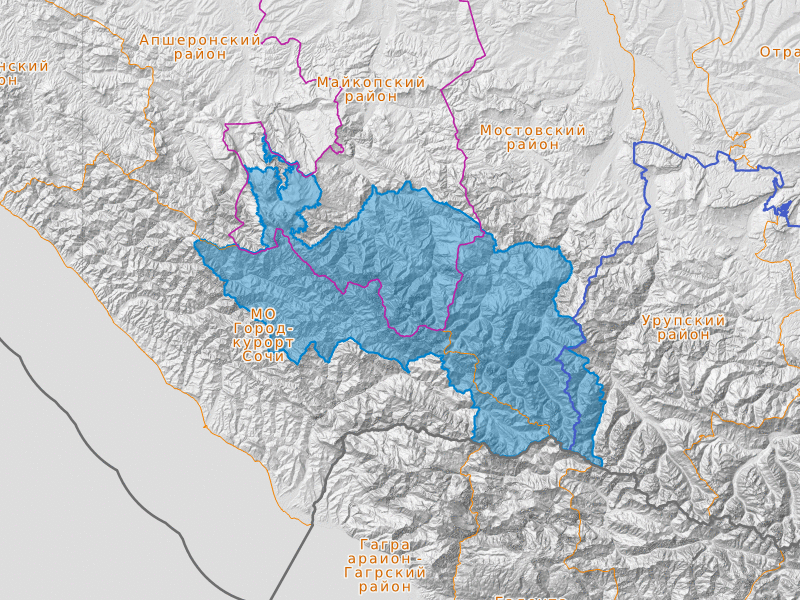
Boundaries of the Caucasus Nature Reserve, in the northwest Caucasus Mountains

== Climate and ecoregion ==
Caucasus is located in the Caucasus mixed forests ecoregion. This ecoregion is located along the Caucasus Mountains between the Black Sea and the Caspian Sea. The region has one of the highest levels of species endemism and diversity in the world: 23% of vascular species, and 10% of vertebrates.

The climate of Caucasus is humid subtropical (Köppen climate classification Cfa), a climate characterized by hot, humid summers and cool winters. In the Caucasus Reserve, however, the high range of altitudes leads to severe tundra climate at the highest elevations. The average temperature in January is 4.3 C degrees, in July it is 21 C degrees. Annual precipitation is 700 – 1,200 mm.

== Flora and fauna ==
The plant life of the reserve is characterized by high biodiversity, reflecting the position of the site at the meeting point of several floral zones (temperate and sub-tropical) and with the widest range of altitude zones (from forested river valleys to mountain top tundra). The reserve has recorded 1,500 species of vascular plants, of which 20% are endemic to the Caucasus. Most of the territory is forested, with sub-alpine and alpine meadows at the higher elevations. The coniferous yew trees in the Khosta sector can reach an age of over 2,000 years. The typical trees of the lower elevations are oak and alder. The upper forest levels are more dark fir and spruce. The rest of the Caucasus Reserve differ from those of northern Europe by the presence of vines.

The animal life of the reserve is noteworthy for the large number of species, particularly of large mammals. Scientists on the reserve have recorded 89 species of mammal, 15 species of reptile, 9 of amphibian, 21 of fish, over 100 species of mollusc, and more than 10,000 species of insect. Bird life is also prolific, with 248 species of bird, including 112 that nest within the borders of the reserve.

== Eco-education and access ==
As a strict nature reserve, the Caucasus Reserve is mostly closed to the general public, although scientists and those with 'environmental education' purposes can make arrangements with park management for visits. There are several 'ecotourist' routes in the reserve, however, that are open to the public, but require permits to be obtained in advance. These routes are:

- The Zoo. A captive animal complex.
- Khosta Yew-Tree Grove.
- Devil's Gate Canyon. 50 meter walls with 5 meter width.
- Nature Reserve and Dolmen. A dolmen is a single-chamber monolithic tomb.
- Rope Adventure Park. Family activities with rope bridges, etc.

The main office is in the city of Sochi.

== Gallery ==
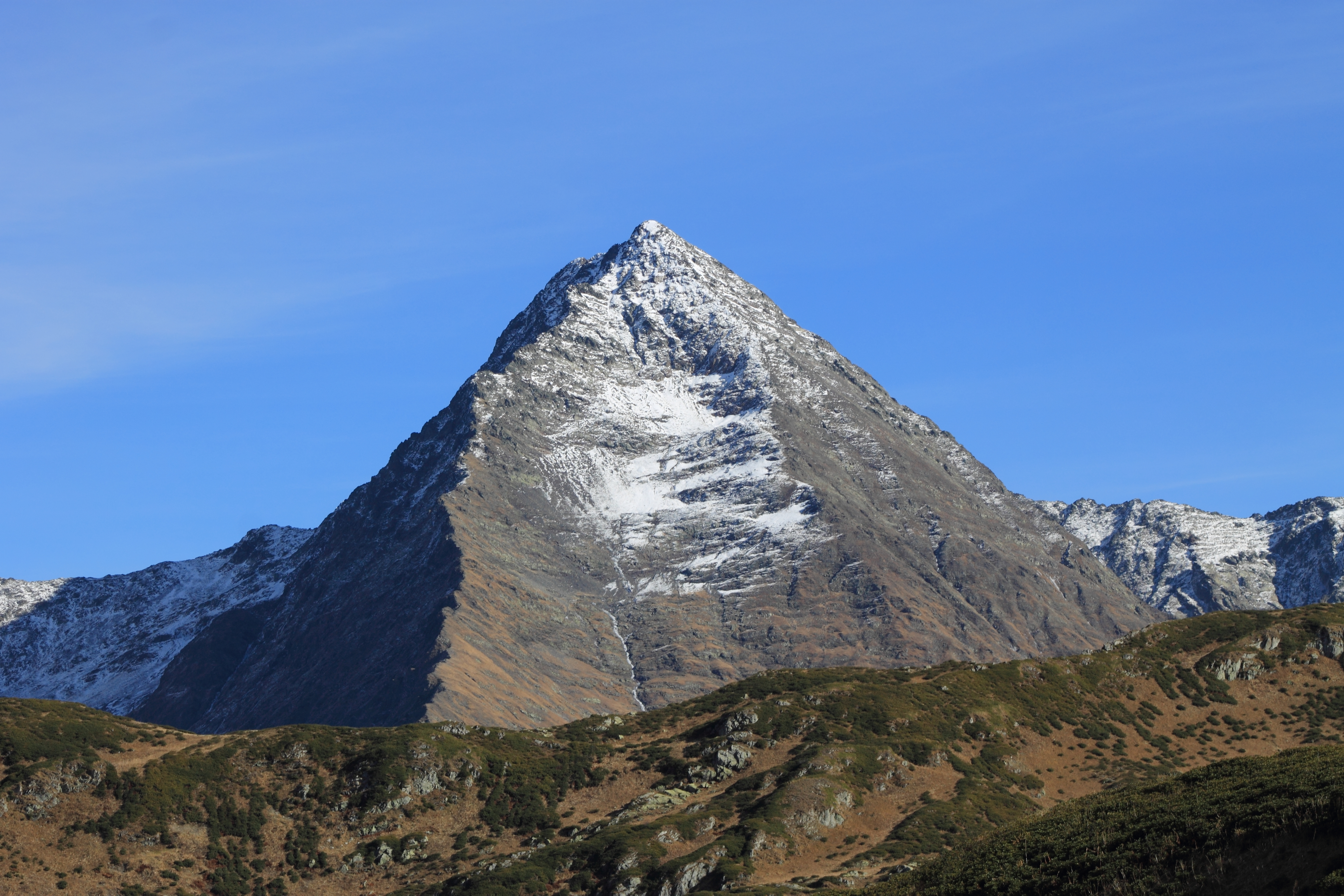

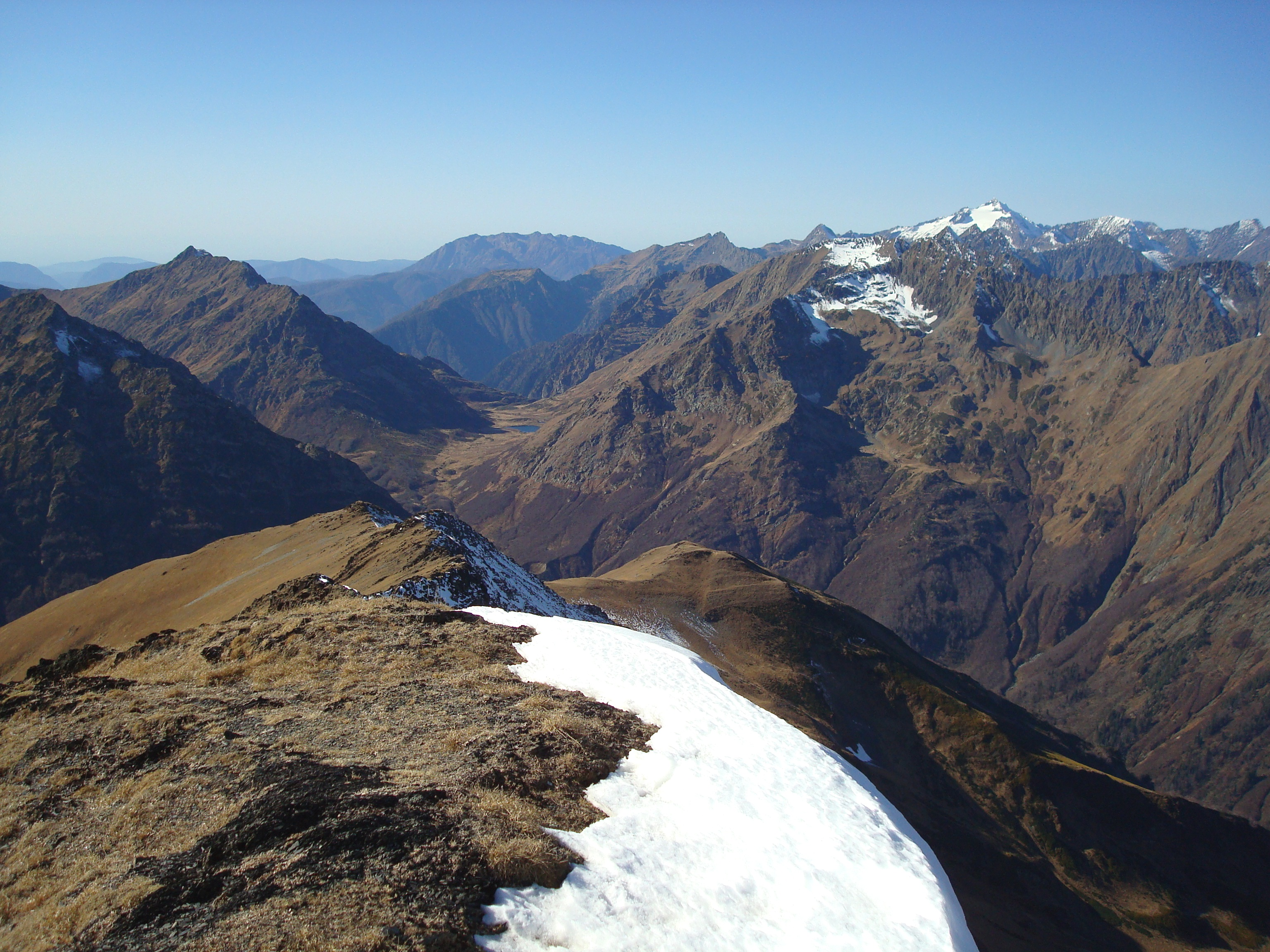

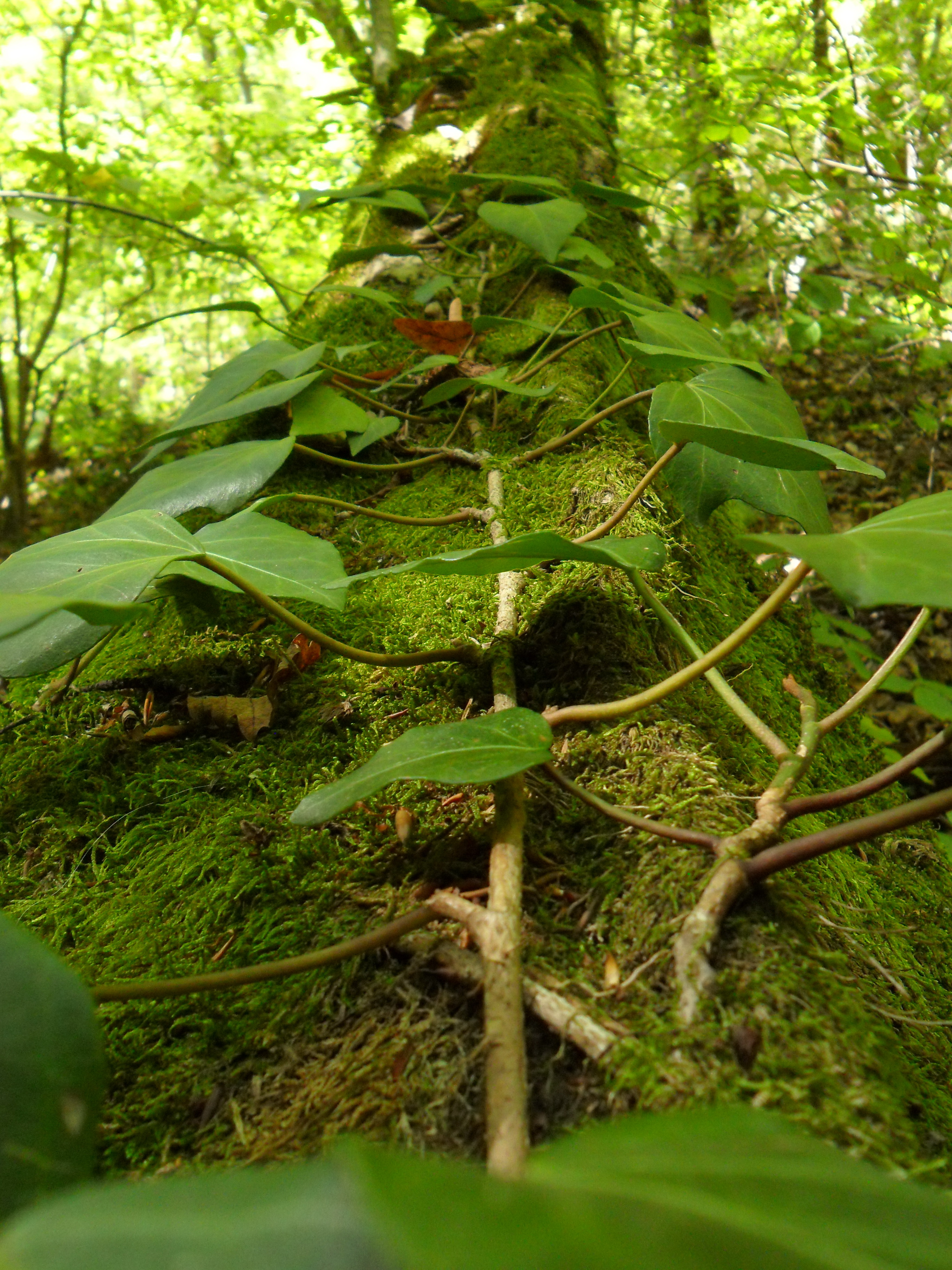

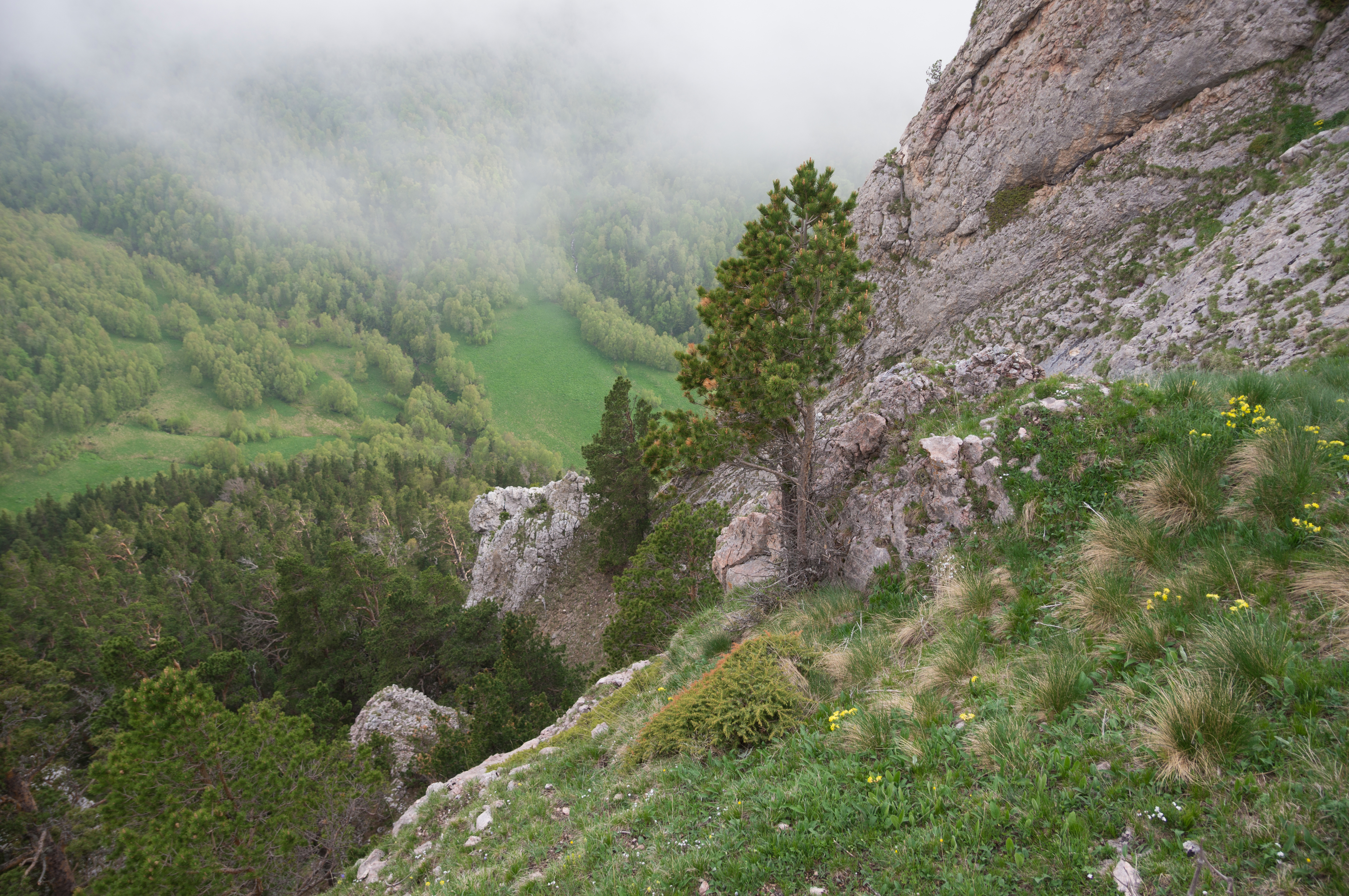

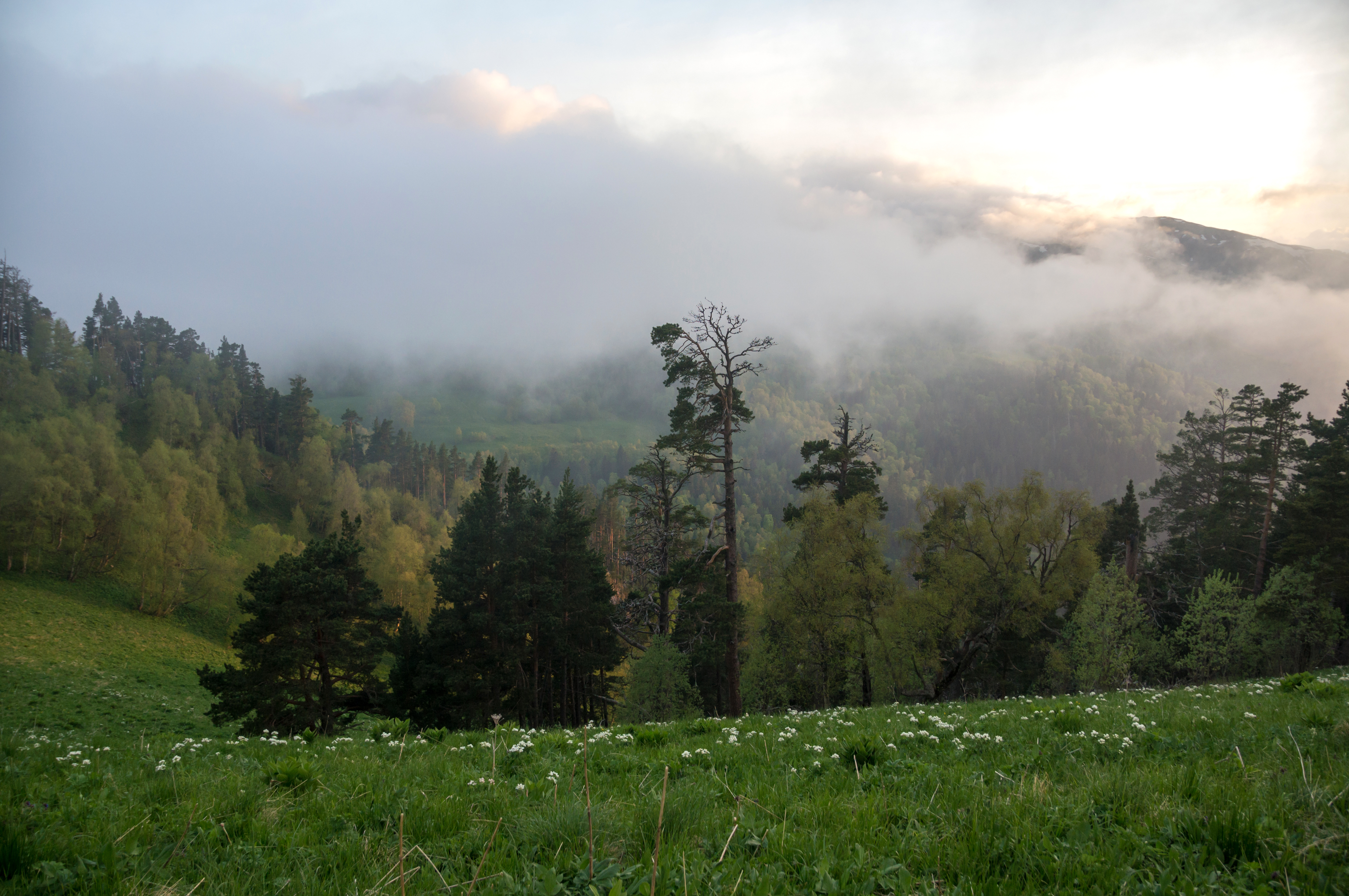

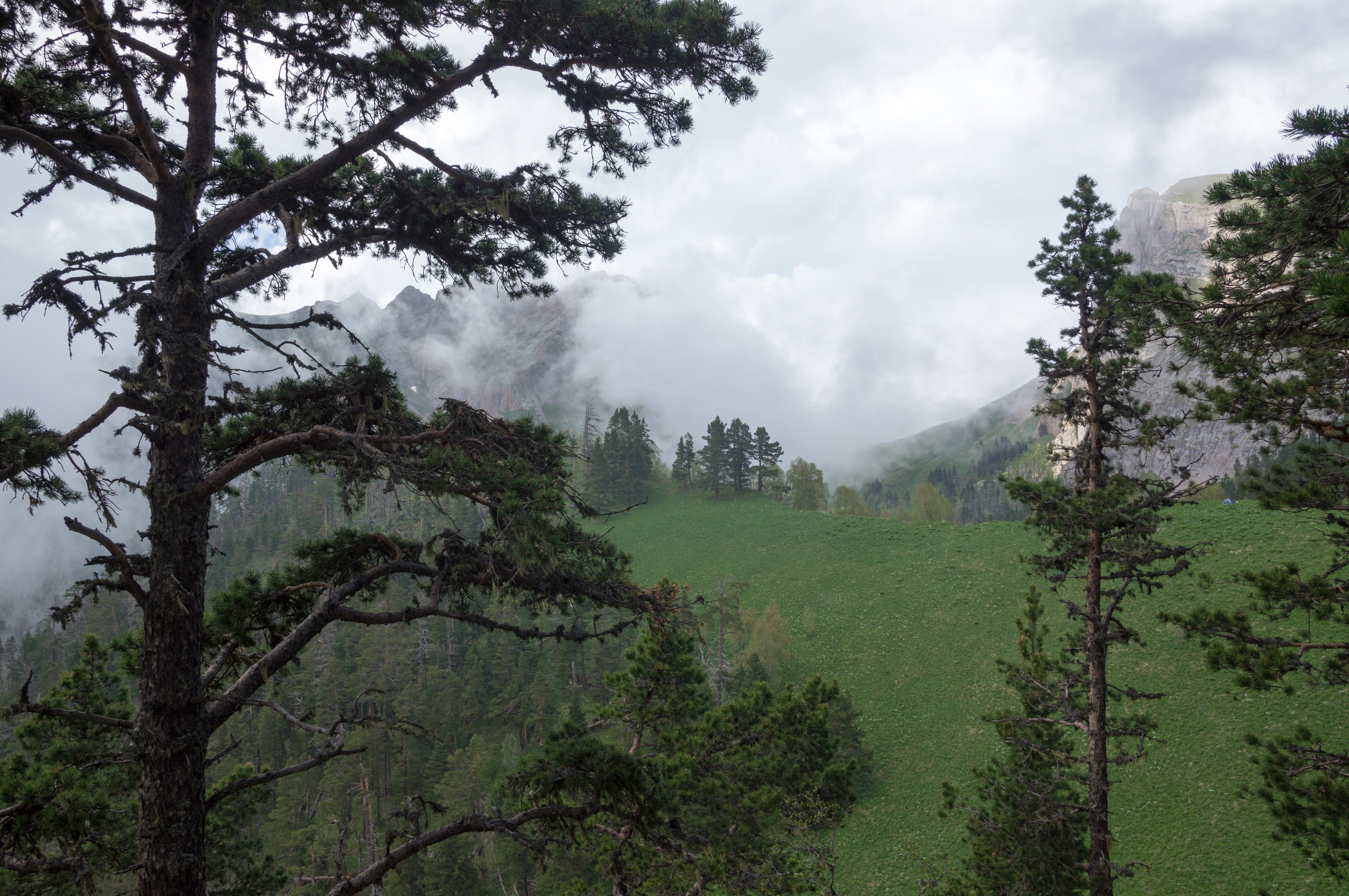

== See also ==
- List of Russian Nature Reserves (class 1a 'zapovedniks')
- List of national parks of Russia
