= North Caucasus =

Subregion in Eastern Europe

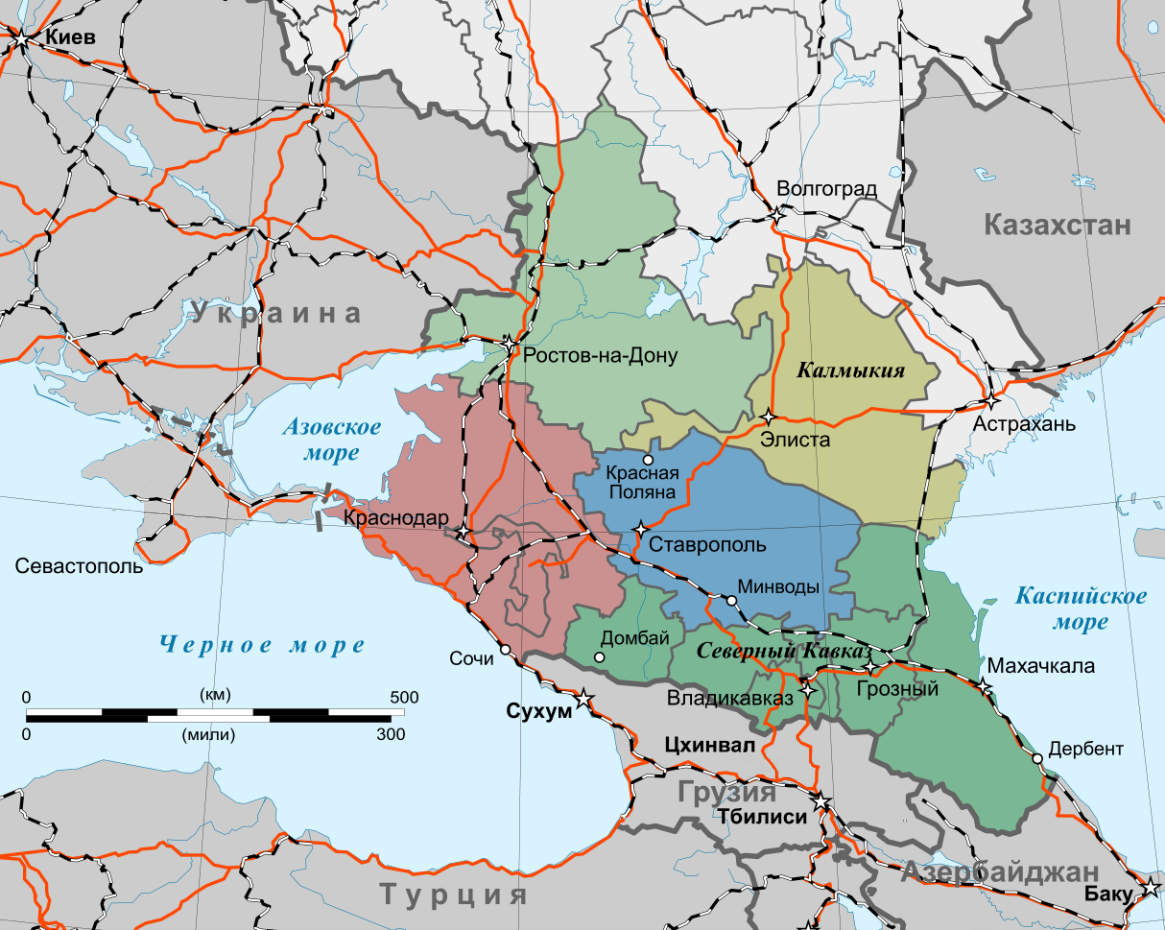
- Map of North Caucasus
- Coordinates: 45°N 42°E
- Country: Russia
- Federal subjects: Republic of Adygea; Republic of Chechnya; Republic of Dagestan; Republic of Ingushetia; Republic of Kabardino-Balkaria; Republic of Kalmykia (partially); Republic of Karachay-Cherkessia; Krasnodar Krai; Republic of North Ossetia-Alania; Rostov Oblast (partially); Stavropol Krai
- Demonym: North Caucasian
- Time Zones: UTC+03:00
- Highest mountain: Elbrus (5,642 metres (18,510 ft)) (Note: Mount Elbrus is widely considered to be the tallest European peak.)

The North Caucasus, (Note: (Adyghe: Темыр Къафкъас, romanized: Temır Qafqas; Avar: Хьундасеб Кавказ; Karachay-Balkar: Шимал Кавказ, romanized: Şimal Kavkaz; Chechen: Къилбаседа Кавказ, romanized: Q̇ilbaseda Kavkaz; Ingush: Даькъасте, romanized: Däq̇aste; Kabardian: Ишхъэрэ Къаукъаз, romanized: İṩxhərə Qauqaz; Iron Ossetic: Цӕгат Кавказ, romanized: Cægat Kavkaz; Russian: Северный Кавказ, romanized: Severnyy Kavkaz, IPA: [ˈsʲevʲɪrnɨj kɐfˈkas])) or Ciscaucasia, (Note: Russian: Предкавказье, romanized: Predkavkazye; Also translated as Ciscaucasus or Forecaucasus) is a subregion in Eastern Europe which is part of Russia. (Note: The northern part of the Caucasus is widely considered to be a part of the European continent, as it sits north the Greater Caucasus watershed.) It constitutes the northern part of the wider Caucasus region, which separates Europe and Asia. The North Caucasus is bordered by the Sea of Azov and the Black Sea to the west, the Caspian Sea to the east, and the Caucasus Mountains to the south. The region shares land borders with the countries of Georgia and Azerbaijan in the South Caucasus. (Note: The North Caucasus also shares borders with the two partially recognized breakaway states of South Ossetia and Abkhazia to its south, both of which are internationally recognised as part of Georgia.) Located in the southern part of the region, Mount Elbrus is the tallest peak in Europe. Krasnodar is the most populous among the urban centres in the region.

The North Caucasus came under Russian control in the 19th century, following the Caucasian War between the Russian Empire and the various regional powers. The territory is the southernmost portion of Russia and is divided between a number of republics and krais. It is administered as part of the North Caucasian and Southern Federal Districts and consists of Krasnodar Krai, Stavropol Krai, and the constituent republics, approximately from west to east: the Republic of Adygea, Karachay-Cherkessia, Kabardino-Balkaria, North Ossetia–Alania, Ingushetia, Chechnya, and Republic of Dagestan and to the north: Kalmykia.

Geographically, the term North Caucasus also refers to the northern slope and western extremity of the Greater Caucasus mountain range, as well as a part of its southern slope to the west. The Pontic–Caspian steppe area is often also encompassed under the notion of a Ciscaucasus region, thus the northern boundary of the Forecaucasus steppe or Nogai steppe is generally considered to be the Manych River. Owing to its mild climate compared to much of Russia, the region has been described as Russia's "sunbelt".

== History ==
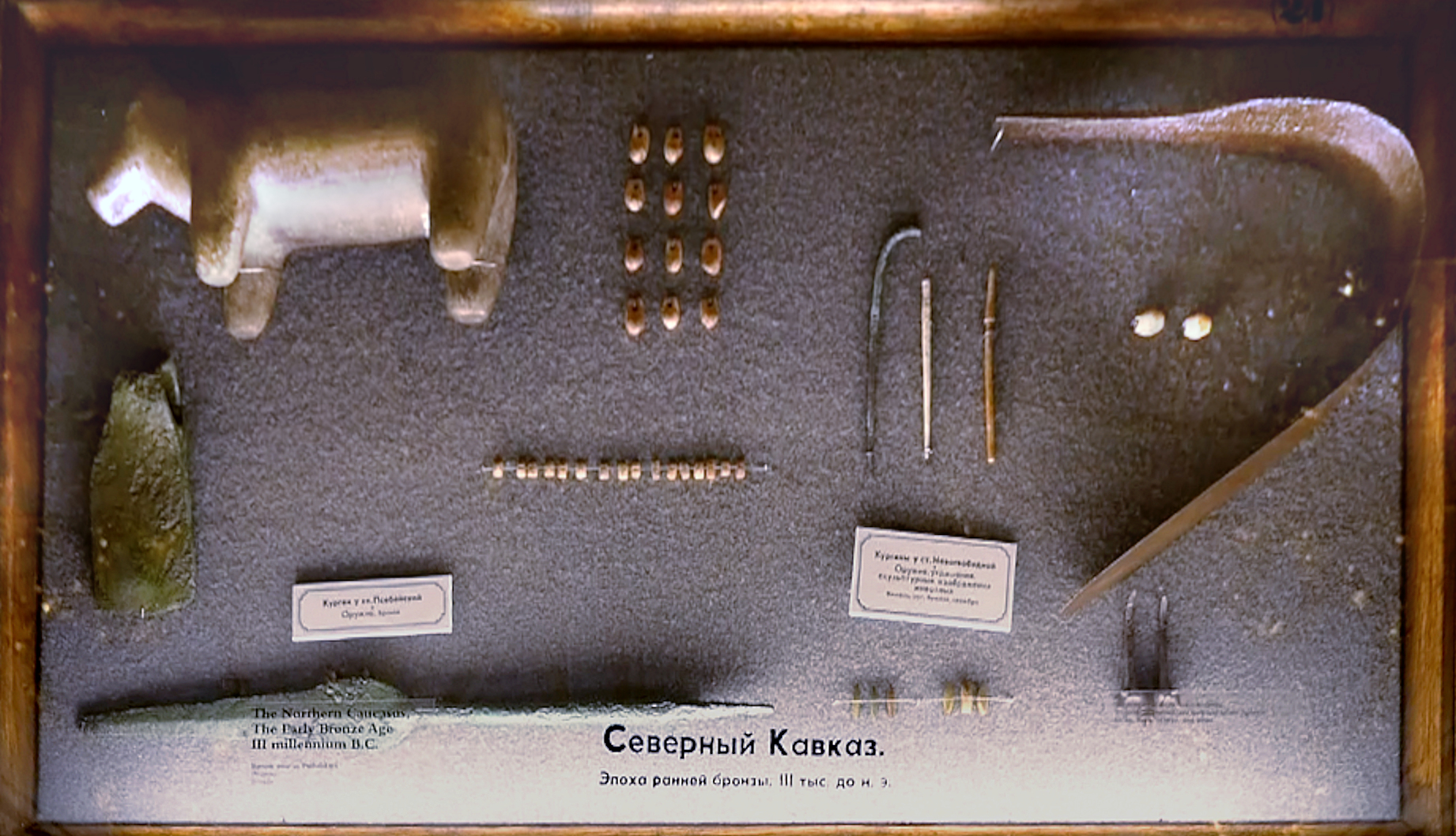
Northern Caucasus, Early Bronze Age artifacts, 3rd millennium BCE.

Ancient cultures of the Northern Caucasus are known as the Klin-Yar community, with one of the most notable cultures being the ancient Koban culture.

Ciscaucasus was historically covered by the Pontic–Caspian steppe, largely consisting of fertile calcareous chernozyom soils that have since been extensively tilled and grazed. It is bounded by the Sea of Azov on the west, and the Caspian Sea on the east. According to the Concise Atlas of the World, Second Edition (2008), the Ciscaucasus region lies on the European side of the "commonly-accepted division" that separates Europe from Asia.

The Russian Empire completed the conquest of the North Caucasus by 1864. Between the 1850s and World War I, about a million North Caucasian Muslims, including Circassians, Chechens, Ingush, Ossetians, and others, became refugees in the Ottoman Empire. The Ottoman government settled North Caucasian refugees in territories of modern-day Turkey, Syria, Jordan, Lebanon, Israel, Iraq, Georgia, Bulgaria, Romania, Serbia, Kosovo, Greece, Cyprus, and North Macedonia, creating a large North Caucasian diaspora.

Much of the Northern Caucasus seceded from Russia in 1918 as the Mountainous Republic of the Northern Caucasus, taking advantage of the instability caused by the Russian revolutions and becoming a minor participant in the Russian Civil War. Mountainous Republic troops engaged in fierce clashes against the invading White General Anton Denikin's Volunteer Army, before the latter's defeat at the hands of the Red Army. The region was informally occupied by the Soviet Russia shortly thereafter, and the republic was compelled to accept a nonviolent annexation in January 1921. It was subsequently reformed into the Mountainous ASSR, which was dissolved in October 1924 and replaced by a series of autonomous Okrugs and Oblasts.

The outer border of the Soviet Union's North Caucasus Krai corresponded to that of the present-day North Caucasus Economic Region (Raion) which includes an oblast (Rostov Oblast), two krais (Krasnodar Krai and Stavropol Krai), and seven republics. The former North Caucasus Military District (Okrug) also included Astrakhan Oblast, Volgograd Oblast, and the Republic of Kalmykia. Its administrative center was Rostov-on-Don until 10 January 1934, Pyatigorsk until January 1936, then Ordzhonikidze (today Vladikavkaz) and, from 15 December 1936, Voroshilovsk (today Stavropol).

=== Unrest ===
The North Caucasus region experienced widespread unrest and insurgency after the fall of the Soviet Union, including a low-level armed conflict between Russia and militants associated with the Caucasus Emirate and, from June 2015, the Islamic State.

The insurgency became relatively dormant in its later years. During its peak, the violence was mostly concentrated in the North Caucasus republics of Chechnya, Dagestan, Ingushetia and Kabardino-Balkaria. Occasional incidents happened in surrounding regions, such as North Ossetia–Alania, Karachay-Cherkessia, Stavropol Krai, and Volgograd Oblast.

While the insurgency was officially declared over on 19 December 2017 when FSB Director Alexander Bortnikov announced the final elimination of the insurgent underground in the North Caucasus, counter-terrorism operations in the North Caucasus have not ended. In June 2022, the US State Department advised citizens not to travel to the North Caucasus, including Chechnya and Mount Elbrus, due to terrorism, kidnapping and risk of civil unrest.

== Economy ==
The North Caucasus is considered part of peripheral Russia, and suffers from very low levels of economic development. The United States' National Intelligence Council in 2004 described the region as being dominated by corruption, weapons smuggling, and lagging economies. The main source of employment in the North Caucasus is the black market, and organized crime is powerful in local business and politics.

The Russian government has primarily focused on expanding the tourism sector to encourage development in the North Caucasus. This strategy has proven unsuccessful, with only two percent of the region's economy coming from tourism revenues. Primary reasons that people do not travel to the North Caucasus include poor infrastructure in the region, frequent instability and violence, and the poor image of the Caucasus in the Russian public consciousness.

== Population ==
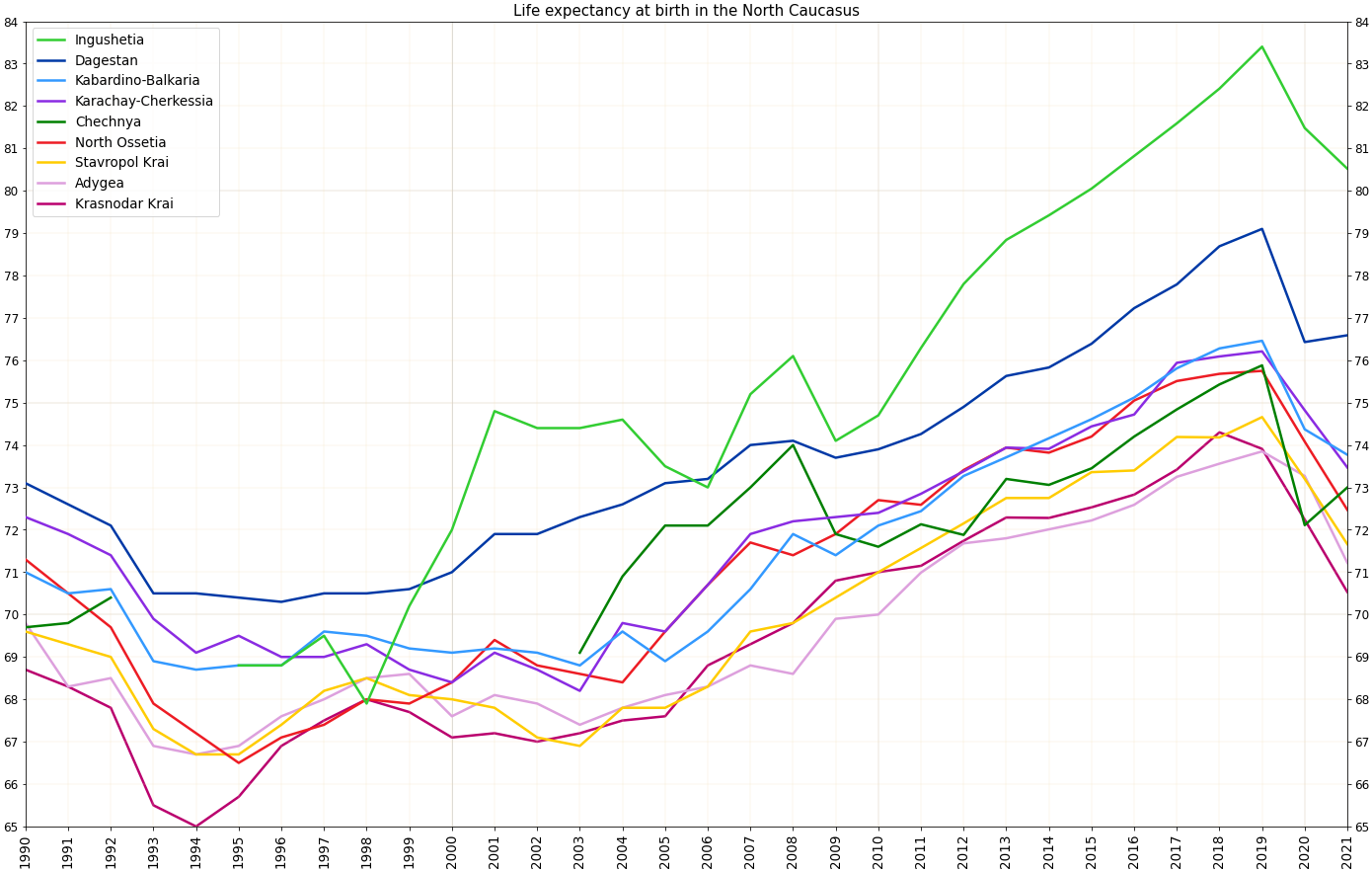
Life expectancy at birth in the North Caucasus, 1990–2021

The North Caucasus, especially in its mountainous territories, has the highest life expectancy in Russia. The region is known for a large number of centenarians.

The North Caucasus is extremely ethnically and linguistically diverse, which has been a historic driver of conflict in the region. Luxembourgish politician Anne Brasseur wrote in 2004 that "There is no other region in Russia or Eurasia in general in which so many peoples and ethnic groups with their various languages and cultures live together in such a small area." The local population predominantly follows Sunni Islam, with the exception of the Ossetians. The western half of the North Caucasus (comprising the republics of Adygea, Kabardino-Balkaria, Karachay-Cherkessia, and North Ossetia) also has extant traditions of paganism, which have become closely connected to Islam. In contrast, the eastern portion of the North Caucasus (including Chechnya, Dagestan, and Ingushetia) is dominated by Sufism.

Conflicts between Islamic ethnic groups are also frequent, with battles for control over religious and political institutions often overlapping. As an example, the takeover of the Spiritual Board of Muslims of Dagestan (now the Muftiate of the Republic of Dagestan) by Sufi tariqa sheikhs, who were predominantly ethnic Avars, led to a conflict over the board's leadership, involving religious, ethnic, and political differences.

== Administrative divisions ==
The North Caucasus region within Russia
- Red: NC economic region, former NC krai, former NC military okrug
- Green: former NC military okrug
- Blue: NC economic region, NC federal okrug, former NC military okrug

Russian political subdivisions associated with the region include:

- Mountain Autonomous Soviet Socialist Republic (Under RSFSR)
- North Caucasian Federal District
- North Caucasian Soviet Republic
- North Caucasus economic region
- North Caucasian Krai
- North Caucasian Military District
- Southern Federal District

== Gallery ==
Location of the North Caucasian Federal District

Map of former North Caucasus Military District (okrug)

Map of modern-day North Caucasus Economic Region (raion)

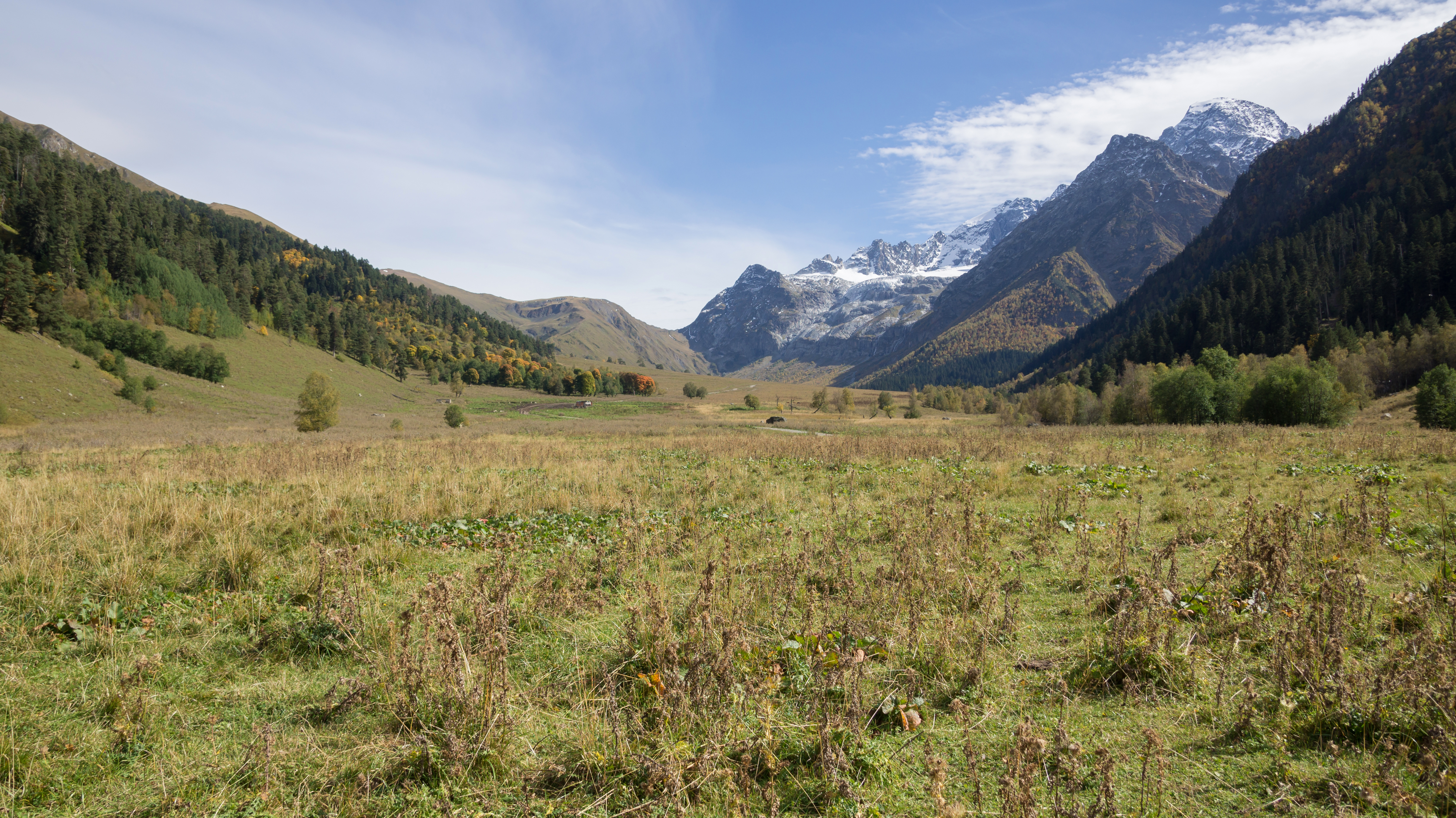
Sophia Valley, Karachay-Cherkessia

== See also ==
- Dolmens of the North Caucasus
- North-Caucasus Federal University
- North Caucasus Railway
- Saray-Gora
