= Metropolitan and peripheral Russia =

Geopolitically-defined regions within Russia

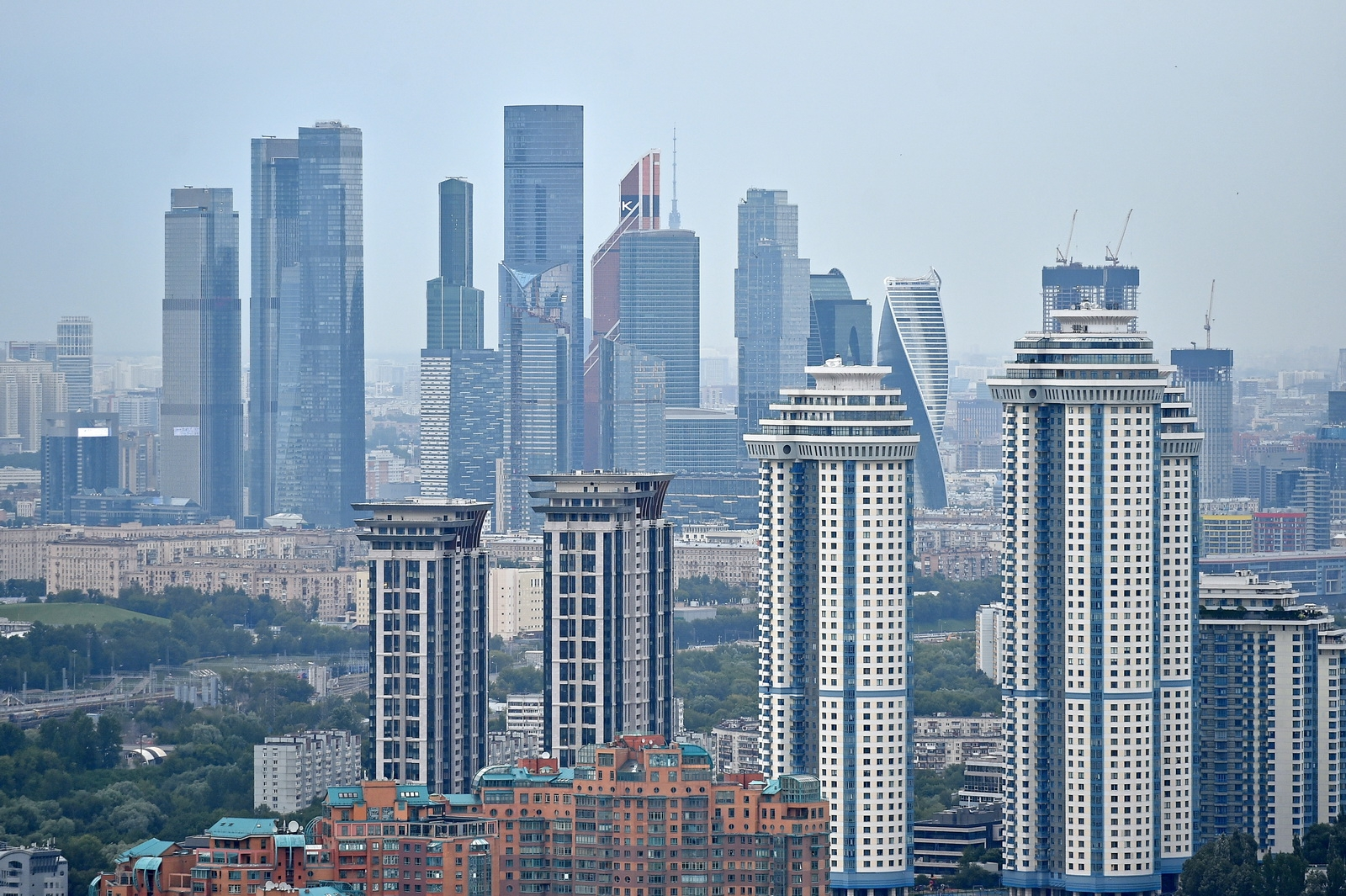
Moscow International Business Centre. The city of Moscow is highly-developed and considered part of metropolitan Russia.

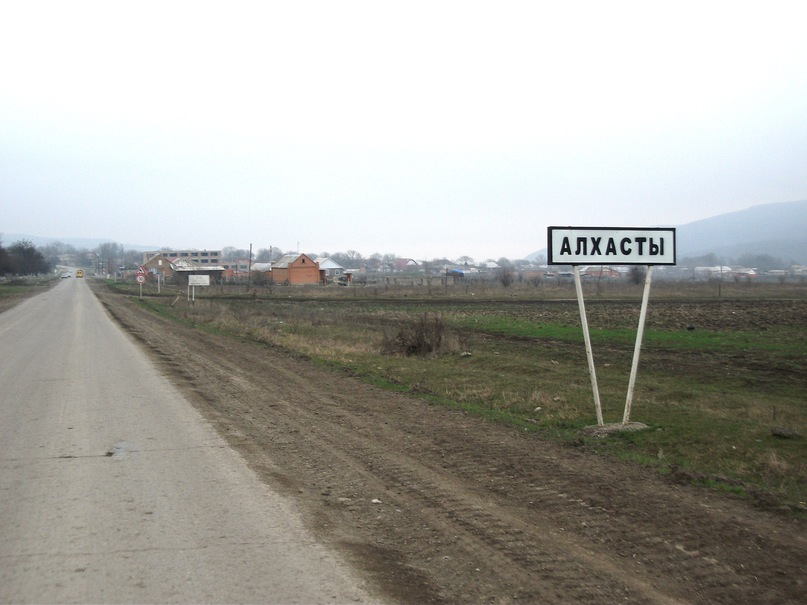
The village of Alkhasty in the republic of Ingushetia. Ingushetia is Russia's poorest federal subject, and the North Caucasus is part of peripheral Russia.

The metropolitan Russia are the areas which are considered to be Russia's "core", contrasted with the peripheral Russia.

== Usage ==
=== Under the Russian Empire ===
Oxford historian Alexander Morrison asserts that the existence of the local government in the form of zemstvos in certain areas of Russia "reflected and helped reinforce the division between a 'core' area of 'Great Russia,' and an 'empire' that lay beyond it."

American independent researcher Allen J. Frank, defines metropolitan Russia as including those areas which were part of the Russian Empire prior to the 19th-century colonisation of the Caucasus and Central Asia. This includes several non-Russian areas, such as the Idel-Ural and western Siberia.

=== Under the Federation ===
Since the dissolution of the Soviet Union and particularly under Vladimir Putin's rule of Russia, the usage of metropolitan and peripheral Russia has increased. Peripheral Russia has been described by Russian political scientist Vladimir Gelman as the "principal constituency of the current ruling class," in reference to Putin's government. Vytautas Magnus University academic Leslie Dienes has described post-Soviet metropolitan Russia as an "archipelago", with highly developed cities being separated by swathes of undeveloped territory. Dienes wrote in 2002 that peripheral Russia was "primitive" and "deprived of the most elementary physical and social infrastructure," in a phenomenon not found in either the rest of Europe or the United States.

During the 1990s the split between metropolitan and peripheral Russia was also present in regional expenditures; Moscow, Saint Petersburg, Samara Oblast and Novosibirsk Oblast were the only regions of Russia where expenditures consistently were higher than revenues. Moscow, in particular, surpassed the national average expenditure by five times. The Russian government's inability to afford subsidies for peripheral regions such as the Far East has resulted in the collapse of almost all industry in the region. According to a 2024 report by the Bertelsmann Stiftung, peripheral Russia "experiences very low levels of development", particularly in the North Caucasus. Metropolitan Russia has an established middle class and is undergoing a transition to post-industrial society, with white-collar workers comprising an increasing amount of its workforce. Despite including only 21% of the population, metropolitan Russia is home to the majority of Russia's internet users and middle class.
