= Ryazanskie Vedomosti =

Russian newspaper

- Type: daily
- Editor-in-chief: Galina Zaitseva (Russian: Галина Зайцева)
- Founded: 1997; 28 years ago
- Language: Russian
- Headquarters: Ryazan
- Circulation: >33 000
- Website: http://rv-ryazan.ru/

Ryazanskie Vedomosti (Russian: Рязанские ведомости) is a regional socio-political daily newspaper, published in Ryazan by the Government of the Ryazan Region and the Ryazan Regional Duma; it has a circulation of 33,250 per week.

== Literature ==
- Paul Hare, Gerard Turley: Handbook of the Economics and Political Economy of Transition. — Routledge, 2013. — p. 97. — ISBN 9781135080877.
- Vladimir Gelman, Vladimir Avdonin, Michael Brie, Sergei Ryzhenkov. Making and Breaking Democratic Transitions: The Comparative Politics of Russia's Regions. — Rowman & Littlefield, 2003. — pp. 185, 293. — ISBN 9780742525610.
- Рязанские ведомости // Рязанская энциклопедия: в 2 т. / гл. ред. В. Н. Федоткин. — Pressa, 2000. — Т. 2. Н-Я. — С. 292. — 719 с. — ISBN 9785861220217.
- Ryazanskie Vedomosti (ru) // Press for all: a handbook / ed. S. B. Dubinskaya. — Journalist-IRS, 2001. — 366 p.
