= History of Sochi =

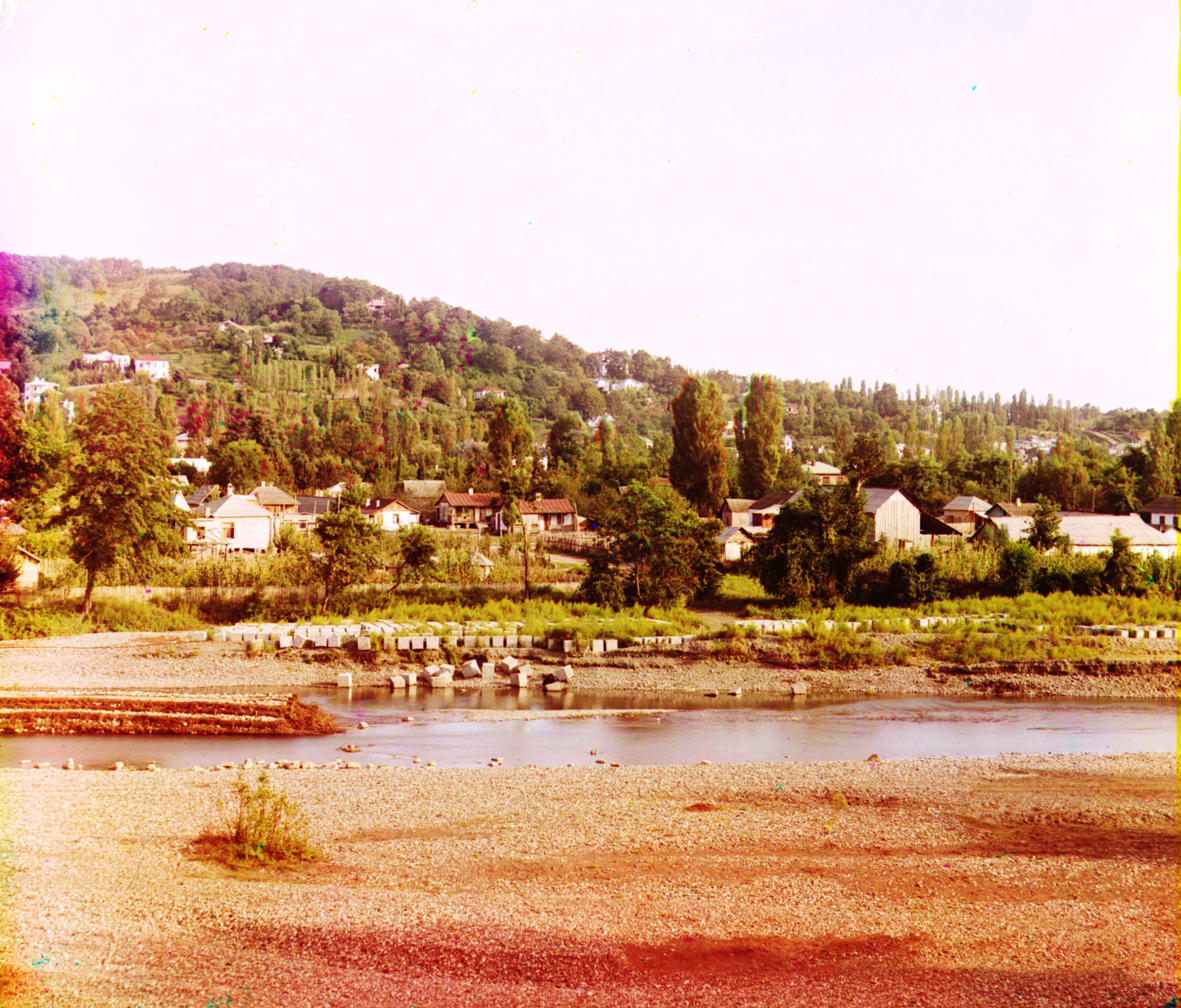
View of Sochi River and Sochi from the west, photo ca. 1905–1915

The area of the Russian city of Sochi was populated more than 100,000 years by ancient people of Asia Minor migrating through Colchis (olden Georgia). Ancient Greeks sailed to the region via the Black Sea in the 5th–6th centuries BC and encountered the Maeotae, Sindi, Cercetae, Zygii and other local tribes. They were the ancestors of the Abkhaz, Ubykh and Adyghe people who lived here until 1864; many toponyms in Sochi, including the city itself, originate from their languages. The first Russian outpost was set up in central Sochi in 1838 as a part of the Russian expansion along the Black Sea coast. The local resistance to this process became a part of the Russo-Circassian War which ended in a Russian victory and the genocide of the local population. The Russian settlement built in the area was named Sochi in 1896 and received the status of a city (town) in 1917. The first tea plantations were established there in 1901–1905 and resulted in the production of the most prominent brand of Russian tea. From the end of the 19th century, the city has been developed as a dedicated area for sanatoriums and hospitals. It served as a rehabilitation center during World War II and, despite a decline following the dissolution of the Soviet Union, remains the major resort town of Russia. An important recent event was selection of Sochi as the site of the 2014 Winter Olympics and 2014 Winter Paralympics.

== Early history ==
Geologically, the area of Sochi is composed of Mesozoic and Cenozoic rocks. They had experienced significant changes due to the volcanic and seismic activity, with the earthquakes measuring up to 9 on the Richter scale. It was populated during the Lower Paleolithic more than 100,000 years ago by early humans migrating from Asia Minor through Colchis. They first formed open-type settlements, but during the Middle Paleolithic (100,000–35,000 years ago) moved to caves due to the global cooling. One evidence of that is known as a 40,000–50,000 old site in the Akhshtyrskaya Cave, 15 km from Adlersky City District. The cave is protected by the UNESCO and contains human remains, early tools and bones of bears, deer and other animals indicating the hunting nature of the inhabitants. In the Upper Paleolithic (35,000–10,000 years ago) they have developed techniques of producing elaborated stone tools.

The Ancient Greeks sailed to the Sochi area in the sixth–fifth centuries BC and kept visiting it till about first century BC. They encountered the Aehi, Zygii and other people who were apparently keen for the luxury goods brought by Greeks and exchanged them for slaves. Slaves were a major commodity of the time, and thus the Caucasian coast became a slave trade center. An ethnic group of a few thousand Greeks still live around Krasnaya Polyana. Between 2,000 and 1,800 BC, the coastal area around Sochi had one cultural entity. During this period, numerous stone monuments (dolmens) were built around Sochi, and at least fifty remain to the present day. It is still unclear how these tombs weighing tens of tons were built with such an accuracy (some stones match each other within millimetres), and what exactly their purpose was. Numerous bronze tools and trade objects, dated to 800–700 BC, were found near Sochi indicating active exchange with the nearby areas. In the Middle Ages, the region was mostly influenced by the Byzantine Empire and Christianity, as evidenced by the style of nine churches and eighteen fortresses dating from those times. The northern wall of an eleventh-century Byzantinesque basilica still stands in Loo Microdistrict.

Entrance to the Akhshtyrskaya Cave	A dolmen near Solokhaul (Sochi)	Plan of a dolmen at Krasnaya Polyana, bronze tips and axes found near Sochi

== Middle Ages ==
During the early 11th century Abkhazian King from Bagrationi dynasty Bagrat II managed to unify Georgian Kingdoms and Sochi remained under control of Bagrat II and his descendants. Sochi was part of Kingdom of Georgia from 10th to 14th century until dissolution of united Georgia under George VIII. Sochi and its inhabitants were later part of the region knows as Zichia after the dissolution of the Georgian kingdom. The native inhabitants of the region, who were the ubykhs, lived a free society ruled by princely clans until the end of the Caucasian war. A detailed description of the coastal area around Sochi originated from the naval expedition of the Frenchman Frédéric Dubois de Montpéreux in 1833. He also compiled former descriptions of the region. Montpéreux however could not land at the site of Sochi as his ship was met with a strong gun fire from the coast. He mentions that in the Middle Ages, a Genoan city of Mamai stood on river Psakhe (modern Mamaika in Sochi), and some 60 north from it a German fortress and a monastery.

== Russo-Circassian War and the Circassian Genocide ==
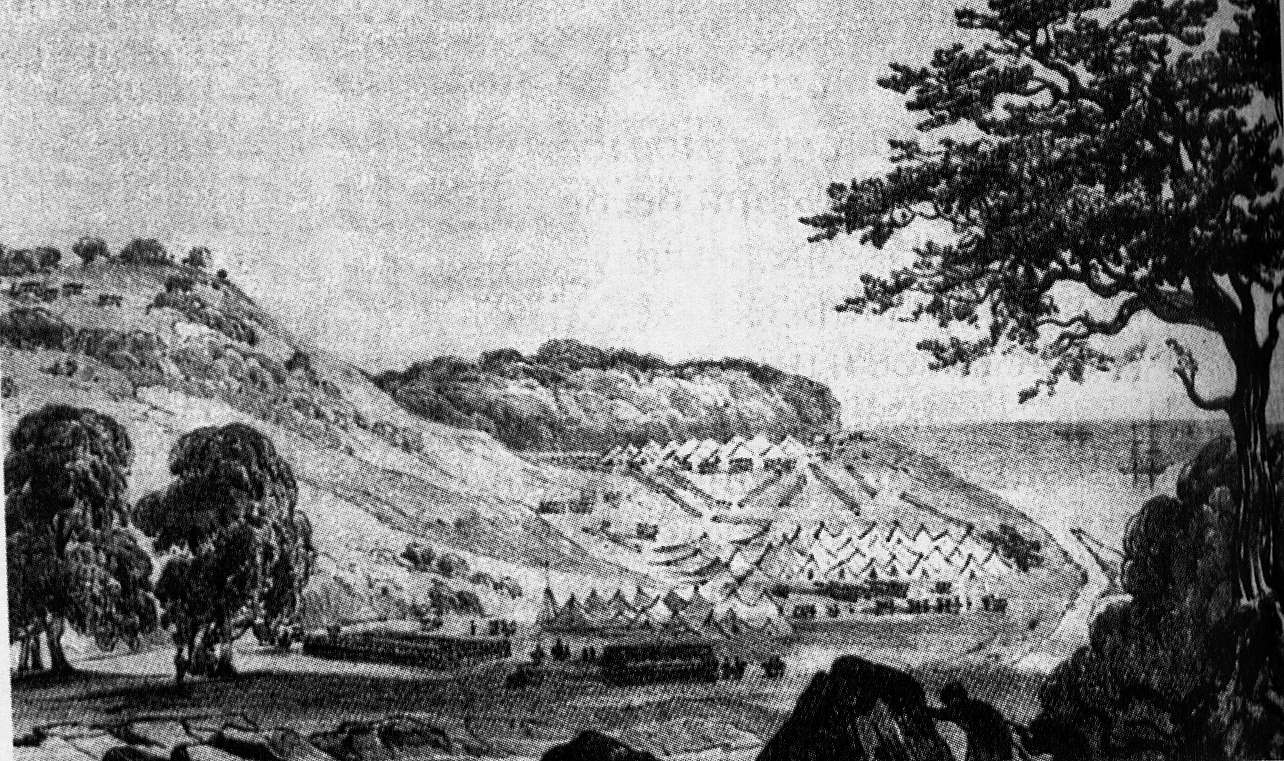
Russian camp at the mouth of Sochi River in April 1838.

Ottoman Turkey had much interest in the Black Sea coast as an outpost for its northern expansions, however, it had lost this area to Russia as a result of the Russo-Turkish War (1828–1829) and the Treaty of Adrianople. To further protect the coast from Turkey, a coastal line of defense was built in 1830–1839 consisting of 17 fortresses. Several of these fortresses were founded in the suburbs of the modern Sochi, such as the fortress of Holy Spirit in Adler (1837), Lazarevskoye (1839) and Golovinskoe (1839). On 23 April 1838, the first stone of the fortress was laid in central Sochi, at the mouth of the Sochi River. This day coincided with the name day of Empress Alexandra Feodorovna, the wife of Tsar Nicholas I, and the fortress was named Alexandria after her. On 18 May 1838 it was renamed into Navaginsky, honoring the bravery of Navaginsky Regimen in the Russian–Circassian War. The construction was completed in July 1838. During the Crimean War of 1853–1856 it was abandoned and partly destroyed; it was rebuilt in 1864 under a new name Dakhovsky.

The locals however did not recognize Russian rule and fiercely opposed what they perceived as genocide. Due to the ongoing Russo-Circassian War, the Russians could not establish full control over the land. This opposition attracted the interest of Britain, which was apparently selling weapons and ammunition to the Circassians. This caused a diplomatic conflict between the Russian Empire and Great Britain in 1836, centered on the Mission of the Vixen. The British ship Vixen loaded with weapons for the Circassians was captured and confiscated by the Russians at the port Sudzhuk-Kale (nowadays Novorossiysk). The British protested, but the position of Tsar Nicholas I was firm and a quick order was given to prepare the army for a war with Britain.

In 1864, the Battle of Qbaada took place in 1864 between the Circassian army of 20,000 a Russian army of 100,000 men, consisting of Cossack and Russian horsemen, infantry and artillery. It resulted in Russian victory, and the Russian army began celebrating victory on the corpses, and a military-religious parade was held, as 100 Circassians were publicly mutilated in a public execution in order to establish authority. The Russian army then continued raiding and burning Circassian villages, destroying fields to prevent return, cutting down trees, and driving the people to the Black Sea coast.

The end of the war was proclaimed on 2 June 1864 at Qbaada (modern Krasnaya Polyana) by the manifesto of Emperor Alexander II read aloud by the Grand Duke Michael Nikolaevich.

After the end of the war, the majority of Circassians were killed or exiled, though a minority resettled in swamps; others who accepted Russification remained. It has been reported that during the events, the Russian-Cossack forces used various methods, such as tearing the bellies of pregnant women. Only a small percentage who accepted conversion to Christianity, Russification and resettlement within the Russian Empire were completely spared. The remaining Circassian population were thus variously dispersed or killed in mass. Sir Pelgrave, a British diplomat who witnessed the events, reports that "their only crime was not being Russian."

A mass deportation was launched against the remaining population in 1864 and it was mostly completed by 1867. Sochi was one of the ports where deportation took place. Some died from epidemics or starvation among crowds of deportees and were reportedly eaten by dogs after their death. Others died when ships underway sank during storms. Calculations including those taking into account the Russian government's own archival figures have estimated a loss of 80–97% of the Circassian population in the process. The displaced people were settled primarily to the Ottoman Empire.

=== Further colonization ===
On 10 May 1864, 12 Cossack stations were set up around the Sochi area for its protection. On 10 March 1866, a decree was proclaimed promoting relocation to the Sochi area of all peoples of Russia. A rural settlement quickly grew on the Black Sea coast. On 23 May 1896 it was named Sochi and shortly after included into the newly formed Black Sea Governorate with the administrative center in Novorossiysk. On 1 May 1898, the governing structure of Sochi was established, which consisted of a chair, vice-chair, and 12 deputies elected by people. On 31 July 1917, the settlement received the status of a town. On 10 February 1961, it was expanded by the inclusion of Adler and Lazarevskoye districts and with an area of 3505 km^{2} and length of 145 km became one of the world's longest cities. In comparison, its area and length in 1941 were 32 km^{2} and 30 km, respectively. From September 1937 until the present day, Sochi is a part of Krasnodar Krai.

== Tea ==
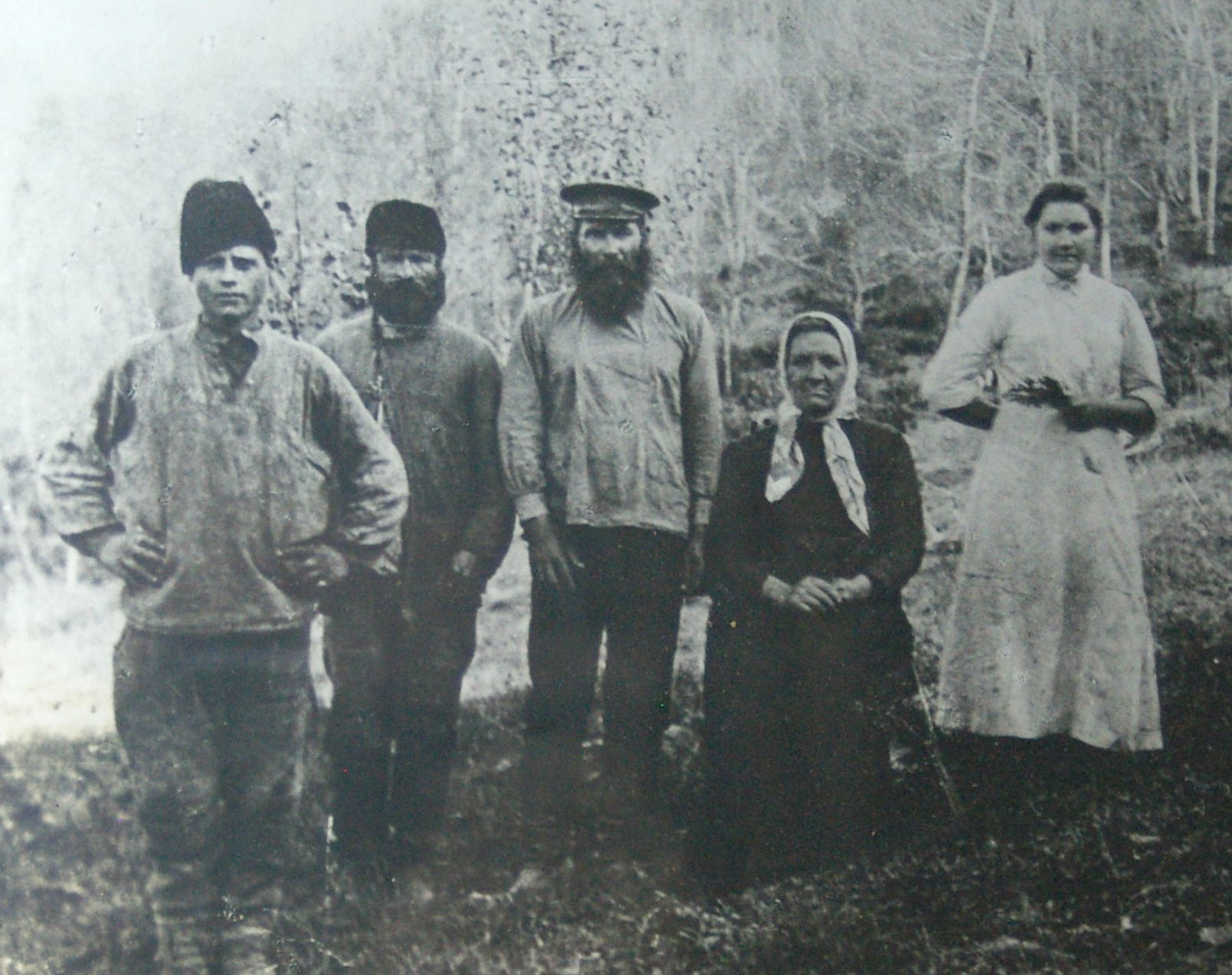
Koshman (middle) with his wife (to the right) and assistants in Solokhaul ca. 1910

The major occupation of the new settlers was in agriculture, and many of them attempted to grow tea, which was then an expensive, yet the most popular non-alcoholic beverage in Russia. Several attempts in the 1870s and 1880s failed because of the cold climate, and the first success was achieved in the early 1900s by the Ukrainian peasant Judas Antonovich Koshman (1838–1935). Koshman previously worked for a tea factory in Adjara, a place south to Sochi on the Black Sea coast. That tea was known in Russia but its taste was unpopular. In 1901, Koshman brought seeds of tea plants from Adjara to Sochi (Solokhaul settlement) and developed a brand which was not only resistant to cold but also had a rich taste. The first successful plantation is dated to 1905. This new tea later became the distinct brand of Krasnodarsky Tea, which is the most prominent Russia-grown tea and is one of the northernmost teas in the world. The house of Koshman still stands in Solokhaul along with the tea bushes planted by his hands.

== Religion, nationalities and their migration ==
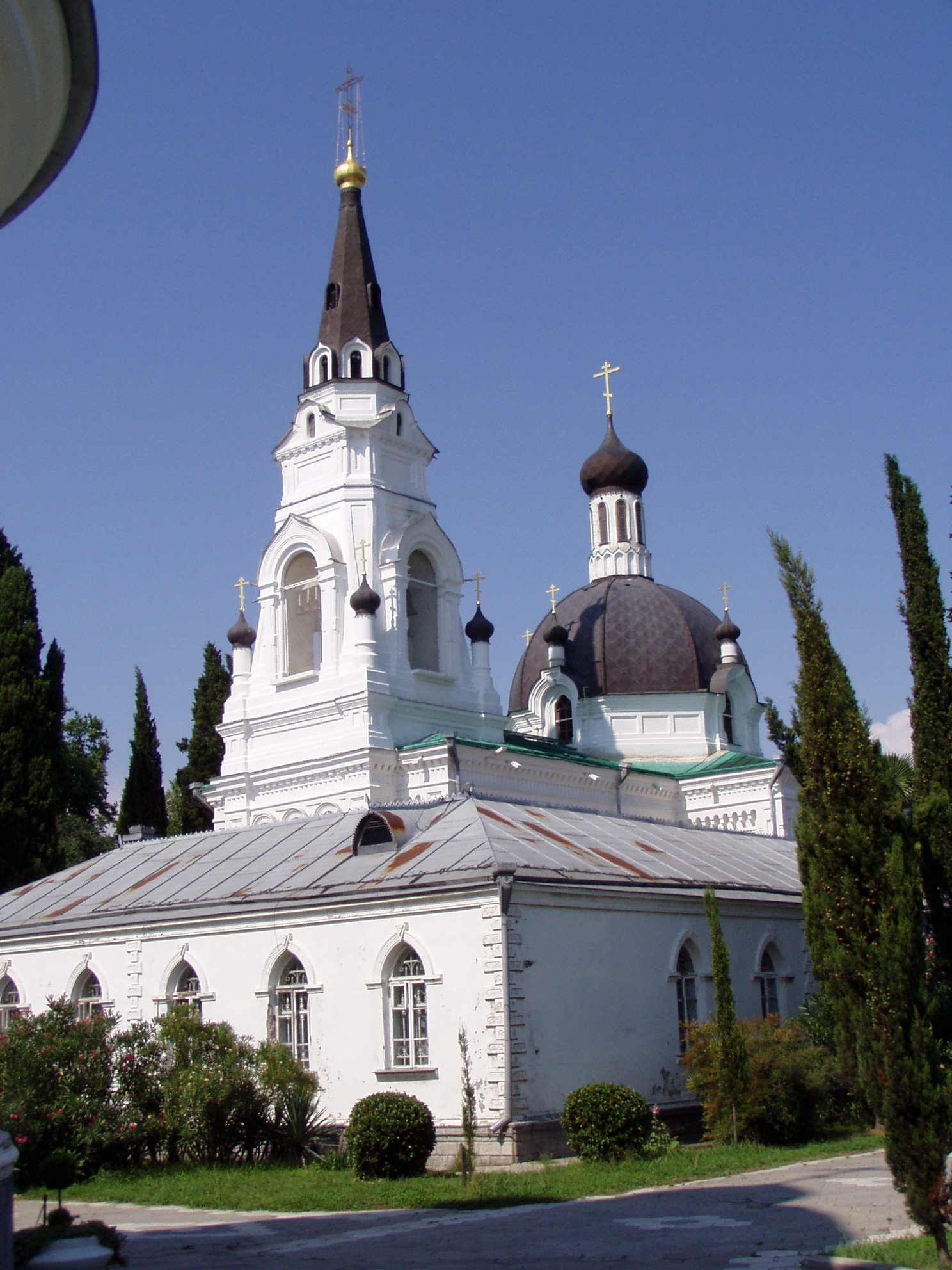
St. Michael's Church

From the 14th to early 19th centuries, the area was mostly populated by the Abkhazo-Circassians, who lived in small clay-wooden houses called "saklya" built on the mountain slopes. Their early religion was Paganism. However, interaction with Turkey resulted in the dominance of Islam, especially between 1829 and 1864 when it was used as a mean to further separate the locals with Russians, who were mainly Orthodox Christians. After the end of the Caucasus War, the Russian government urged relocation of the coastal tribes. This initiative was avidly promoted by the Turkish authorities; however, the relocation to Turkey resulted in much suffering and death as the refugee camps in Turkey could not cope with the large numbers of migrants. Seeing that, the Russians later reversed their policy and invited the locals back, but they already assimilated with Turks and refused the offer.

The new settlers coming belonged to various nationalities (mostly Russians, but also Ukrainians, Georgians, Moldovans, Belarusians, Estonians, Letts and Germans) and religious groups, such as Catholics, Lutherans, Gregorian Armenians, Sunni and other Muslims, but the predominant part was Orthodox Christians. The first Orthodox church in Sochi, the St. Michael's Church, was designed by Alexander Kaminsky and constructed in 1874–1891. Its construction was promoted by the Grand Duke Michael Nikolaevich aiming to commemorate the Russian victory in the Caucasian War and sponsored by Savva Mamontov and Count Felix Felixovich Sumarokov-Elston, among others.

== Etymology ==
Many areas and geographical features of Sochi retained their original names through its entire history.

The name "Sochi" (Russian: Сочи) is the Russianized form of the Circassian "Shache" (Adyghe: Шъачэ) which in turn is of Ubykh origin, most likely coming from the Ubykh name "Shuacha" (Ubykh: Шъуача). It is a compound made up from the Ubykh words "шъуа" shua (sea) and "ча" cha (side) and roughly translates to "Seaside/coast". According to Georgian nationalist groups, the word comes from the Georgian word "სოჭი" soch'i (fir).

It is believed that the name Adler originates from the name of a Circassian tribe, as does Loo. Dagomys means "cool place" in Circassian, Tuapse means "two waters", Matsesta – "fiery water", Kudepsta – "oily water", and Shepsi – "waterless".

== Development of Sochi ==
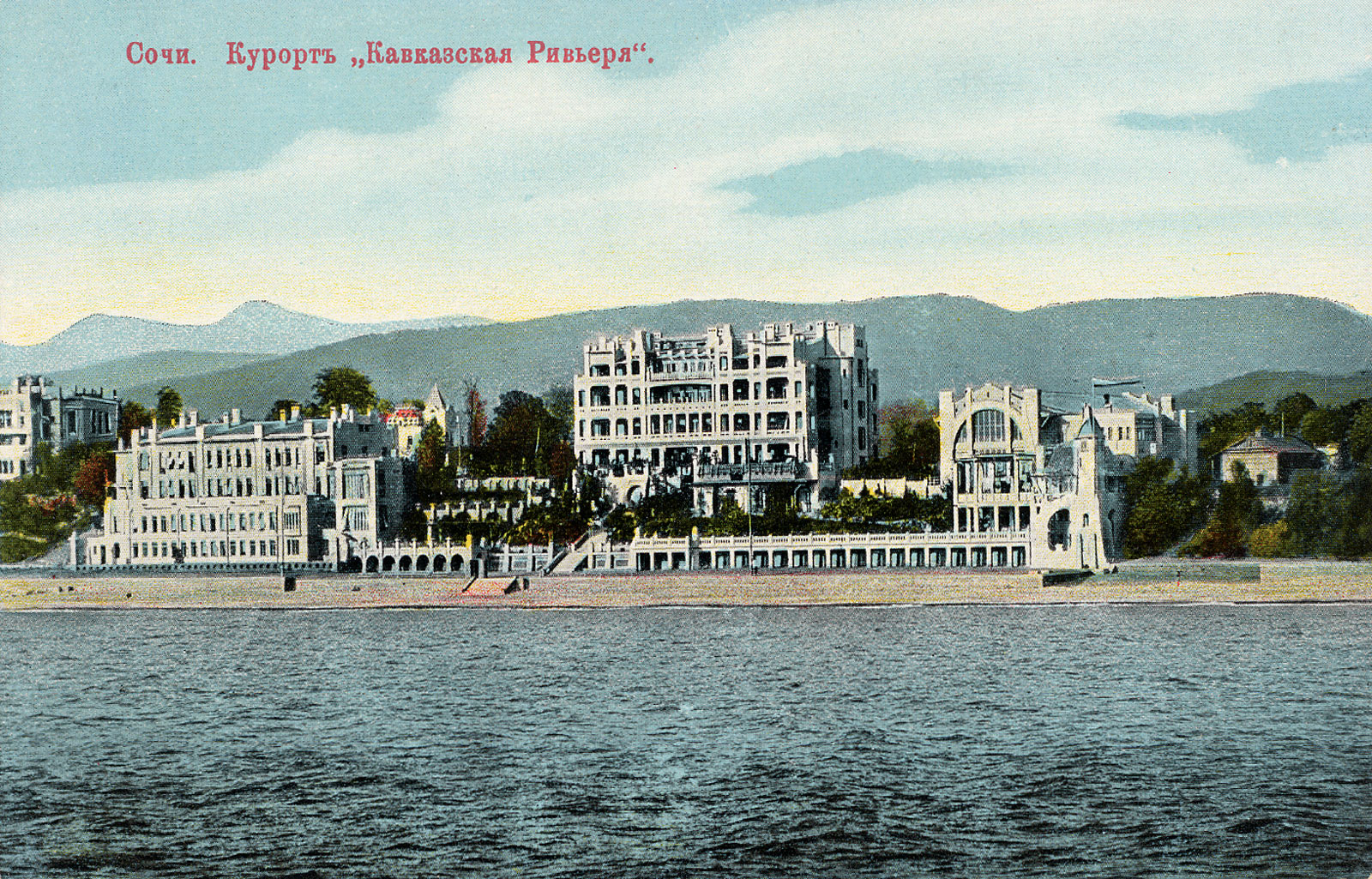
"Kavkazskaya Riviera" sanatorium ca. 1909

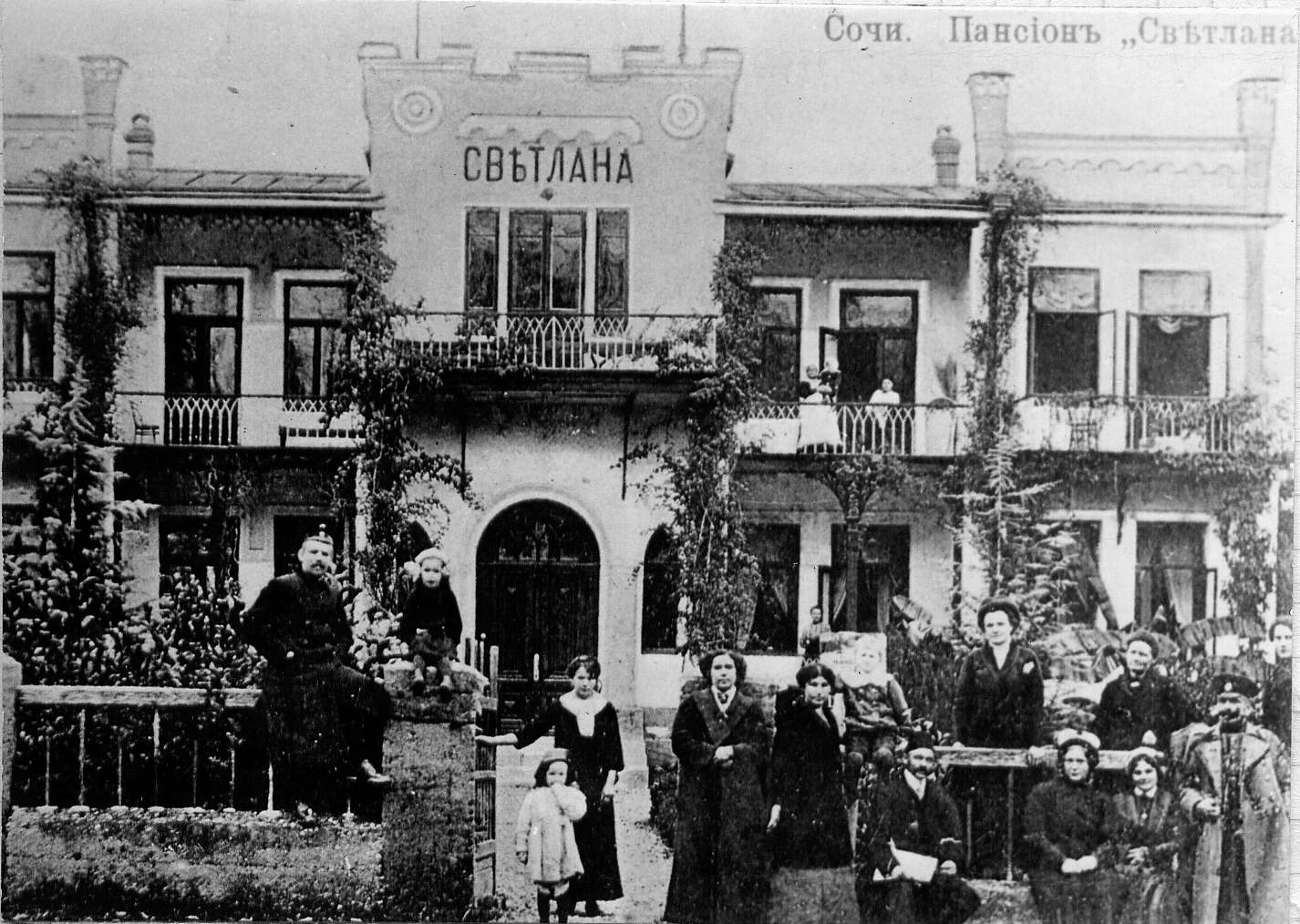
"Svetlana" sanatorium, ca. 1910

Year	No. patients	No. spa sessions
1914	20,000	17,395
1921	4,565	1,345
1925	7,860	32,000
1927	21,443	134,643
1932	71,682	731,216
1935	118,000	960,000
~1985		>6,000,000

The economical development of Sochi was greatly accelerated by the development of transport. In 1888, the construction of a transcoastal road from Novorossiysk to Sukhumi reached Sochi, and a road to Krasnaya Polyana was laid in 1899. Maxim Gorky temporarily worked there around 1892 during his wandering through the Caucasus. In 1934–1936, all minor roads within the city were consolidated in a highway named after Stalin (now Kurortnyi Prospect). In 1913, an electrical power station was built in Sochi, and the next year a regular bus service was organized between Sochi and Adler, at a speed of about 30 km/h; it was extended to Sukhumi and Novorossiysk in 1916. By 1916, railways were laid connecting Sochi with Russia via Tuapse. The first Sochi railway station was built around 1916; it was rebuilt in 1923 and finally in 1952. An airplane landing strip was set up in central Sochi in 1929, but moved to Adler in 1941, where the Sochi Airport was raised around 1945. A seaport was constructed in the central Sochi later in 1955. The Sochi Lighthouse was erected much earlier, in February 1890; its light could be seen from a distance of about 30 km.

Since late 1800s the development of Sochi was directed toward creating a health resort and a green city. The Sochi Arboretum was laid in 1890–1892. In 1902, a wooden bath complex was raised on the territory of modern Matsesta springs, and a joint venture regulating its operation was set up in 1912 led by the merchant M. M. Zensinov and doctor V. F. Podgursky. The first spa resort named "Kavkazskaya Riviera" was opened on 14 June 1909. The first city doctor was A. L. Gordon (1871–1940) who in 1911 established the first hospital in Sochi with the capacity of 35 beds. A number of writers, painters and artists had moved to the area by then and helped establish the educational system of the city. In particular, the Soviet writer Nikolai Ostrovsky lived in Sochi between 1928 and 1936 and has a monument and a museum devoted to him.

As a result of the October Revolution in 1917, all the infrastructure of Sochi was nationalized by the Bolsheviks in the spring of 1918. Georgian intervention resulted in a Russian-Georgian military conflict which lasted from July 1918 to February 1919. Actions of the Volunteer Army and local population resulted in the defeat of Georgian forces. In February 1918, the city was occupied by the Volunteer Army which restored the pre-revolution government system and forced local population to join the army. These measures were met with resistance and in April–October 1919, the local peasants had formed 30 partisan units (named the "Green Army") with the total force of 3,000 people. In parallel, in March 1919, a local section of the Red Army was formed and later merged with the main body. On 29 April 1920, the Volunteer Army was defeated in the Sochi area and its capitulation was signed on 2 May.

In 1920, the management system was set up for developing the health resort infrastructure in Sochi. The first priority was eradicating malaria. In the swampy area of Sochi, this disease was so rampant that the very existence of a health resort here was seriously questioned. The first anti-malaria station was established in 1921. Many swamps were dried and Eucalyptus trees were planted to accelerate the process, as they consume much water. A crucial step was introduction in 1925 of the fish Gambusia affinis (mosquitofish), which feeds on the aquatic larval and pupal stages of mosquitoes. As a result, the number of malaria cases reduced 6 times by the mid-1930s; however, the disease wasn't completely eradicated until 1956. A monument to the fish was raised in Adler in 2010.

In 1924, the Caucasian State Nature Biosphere Reserve was established about 72 km (45 mi) east from central Sochi. It occupies about 2,633 km^{2} (1,017 sq mi) and preserves some 85 m-high specimens of the Nordmann Fir (Abies nordmanniana), thought to be the tallest trees in Europe, and a unique forest formed by English Yew (Taxus baccata) and European Box (Buxus sempervirens). About a third of its high mountain species of plants are recognized as endemic. The area also includes the Sochi National Park (IUCN management category II). It hosted the rare Caucasian wisent, but the last three animals were killed in 1927. In 1940, a group of wisent-American bison hybrids were released into the Caucasian Biosphere Reserve. These hybrids are described as a different subspecies, the highland bison (Bison bonasus montanus).

The first medical research institution was established in Sochi in 1936 and named after Stalin. Between 1936 and 1939 it was led by professor (and then academician) A. I. Nesterov and included laboratories and 4 hospitals with the total of 200 beds. The research of that institute was focused on balneotherapy and physiotherapy. In January 1934, Sochi was included in the list of the first-priority expansion areas of Soviet Union (which was usually reserved for industry). As a result, by 1940 the city contained more than 60 sanatoriums and hospitals with the total capacity of about 9,000 beds. In comparison, in the late 1920s, there were only 6 sanatoriums with 465 beds. The development of Sochi was promoted by Joseph Stalin who had his favorite dacha built in the city – a tradition followed by most succeeding Soviet and Russian leaders. Those dachas were used not only for personal leisure, but also hosted numerous (less formal) meetings with high-ranking foreign officials.

== World War II and after ==
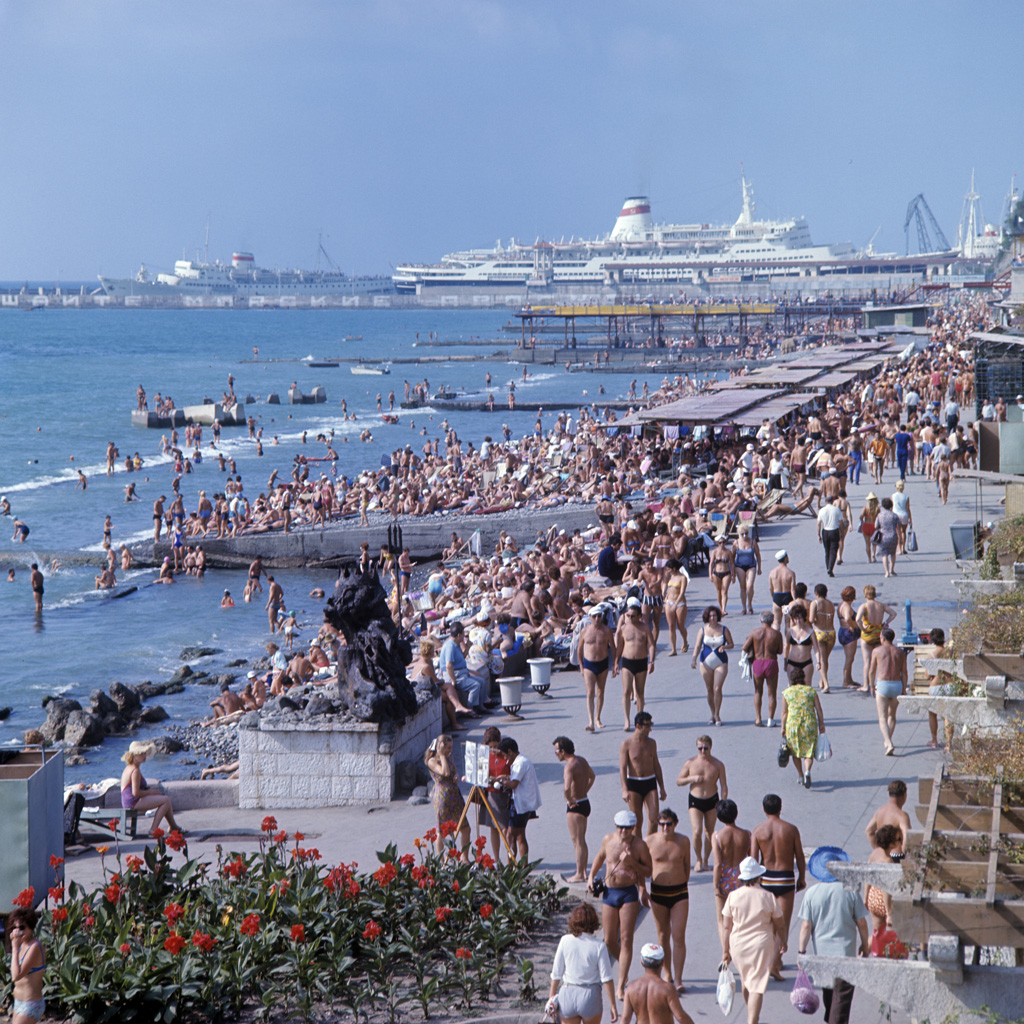
Promenade in Sochi, 1973

During World War II, the entire city became a hospital for the wounded at the Eastern Front; about 500,000 soldiers convalesced in the 111 hospitals of Sochi during that period. About 2,000 donors contributed 20 tonnes of blood for this purpose; also, 18,707 citizens were mobilized into the Army; of them 4,566 were killed and 17 were awarded the Hero of the Soviet Union award (8 posthumously). Katyusha rocket launchers were mass-produced in the city around 1942–1943 when the frontline was at times 25 km north from Krasnaya Polyana. For its achievements during the war, the city was awarded the Order of the Patriotic War in 1980. Its resort infrastructure was partly destroyed during the war and rebuilt by the early 1950s.

After the war, the city kept its position as the leading sanatorium and health resort of the Soviet Union. By the 1960s, it was receiving about 500,000 visitors per year, i.e. about four times its population. This motivated the government to expand the city by including the Adler and Lazarevskoye districts. By the 1980s, the number of tourists rose to 5,000,000 per year, including 200,000 foreigners. It decreased dramatically to 300,000 in the 1990s due to the dissolution of the Soviet Union, and partly recovered to about 1,500,000 by the year 2000.

Technical areas have always played a secondary role in modern Sochi and were represented mostly by construction and food industries. The latter focuses on production of fruits and vegetables, tea, honey, fish and poultry. Commercial fishing in the Black Sea is rather inactive, but there is a trout aquafarm in the city.

Kinotavr, the largest national film festival in Russia, is annually held in Sochi since 1991. In July 2007 Sochi was selected as the site of the 2014 Winter Olympics and 2014 Winter Paralympics that resulted in a major reconstruction of the city.

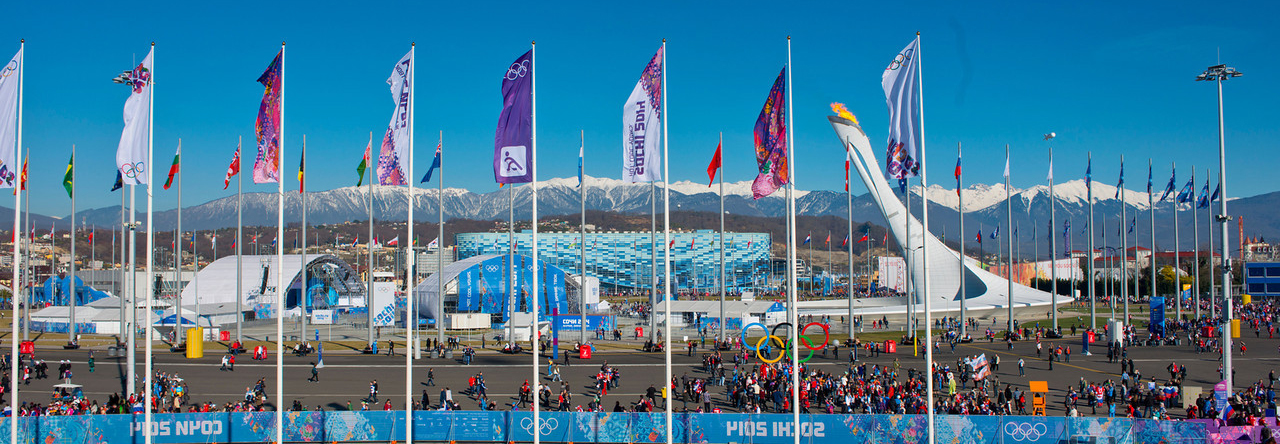
Olympic park, 2014

On January 11, 2025 there were 2 earthquakes in Sochi.

== See also ==
- Dolmens of North Caucasus
