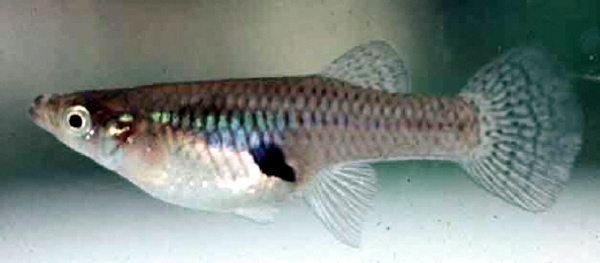
- Female
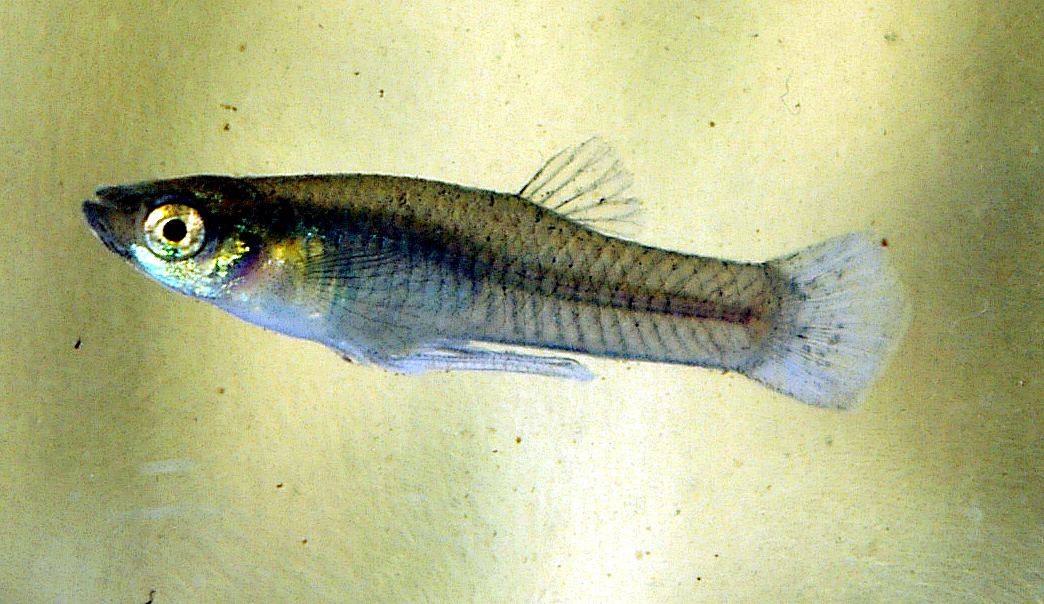
- Male

Conservation status
- Least Concern (IUCN 3.1)

Scientific classification
- Kingdom: Animalia
- Phylum: Chordata
- Class: Actinopterygii
- Division: Teleostei
- Order: Cyprinodontiformes
- Family: Poeciliidae
- Genus: Gambusia
- Species: G. affinis

Binomial name
- Gambusia affinis (S. F. Baird & Girard, 1853)

Synonyms
- List: Heterandria affinis S.F Baird & Girard, 1853; Heterandria patruelis S.F. Baird & Girard, 1853; Gambusia patruelis (S.F. Baird & Girard, 1853); Zygonectes patruelis (S.F. Baird & Girard, 1853); Gambusia gracilis Girard, 1859; Zygonectes gracilis (Girard, 1859); Gambusia humilis Günther, 1866; Haplochilus melanops Cope, 1870; Zygonectes brachypterus Cope, 1880; Zygonectes inurus D.S. Jordan & Gilbert, 1882; Fundulus inurus (D.S. Jordan & Gilbert, 1882)

= Mosquitofish =

Species of fish

The western mosquitofish (Gambusia affinis) is a North American freshwater poeciliid fish, also known commonly, if ambiguously, as simply mosquitofish or by its generic name, Gambusia, or by the common name gambezi. Its sister species, the eastern mosquitofish (Gambusia holbrooki) is also referred to by these names.

Mosquitofish are small in comparison to many other freshwater fish, with females reaching a maximum length of 7 cm (2.8 in) and males a maximum length of 4 cm (1.6 in). The female can be distinguished from the male by her larger size and a gravid spot at the posterior of her abdomen. The name "mosquitofish" was given because the fish eats mosquito larvae, and has been used more than any other fishes for the biological control of mosquitoes. Gambusia typically eat zooplankton, beetles, mayflies, caddisflies, mites, and other invertebrates; mosquito larvae make up only a small portion of their diet.

Mosquitofish were introduced directly into ecosystems in many parts of the world as a biocontrol to lower mosquito populations which in turn negatively affected many other species in each distinct bioregion. Mosquitofish in Australia are classified as a noxious pest and may have exacerbated the mosquito problem in many areas by outcompeting native invertebrate predators of mosquito larvae. Several counties in California distribute mosquitofish at no charge to residents with human-made fish ponds and pools as part of their mosquito abatement programs. The fish are made available to residents only and are intended to be used solely on their own property, not introduced into natural habitat. On 24 February 2014, Chennai Corporation in India introduced western mosquitofish in 660 ponds to control the mosquito population in freshwater bodies.

Fertilization is internal; the male secretes milt into the genital aperture of the female through his gonopodium. Within 16 to 28 days after mating, the female gives birth to about 60 young. The males reach sexual maturity within 43 to 62 days. The females, if born early in the reproductive season, reach sexual maturity within 21 to 28 days; females born later in the season reach sexual maturity the next season, in six to seven months.

== Description ==
Mosquitofish are small and of a dull grey coloring, with a large abdomen, and have rounded dorsal and caudal fins and an upturned mouth. Sexual dimorphism is seen; mature females reach a maximum overall length of 7 cm (2.8 in), while males reach only 4 cm (1.6 in). Sexual dimorphism is also seen in the physiological structures of the body. The anal fins on adult females resemble the dorsal fins, while the anal fins of adult males are pointed. This pointed fin, referred to as a gonopodium, is used to deposit milt inside the female. The gonopodium of G. affinis has a smooth third ray (the anteriormost elongated ray), while that of G. holbrooki bears minute denticles. Adult female mosquitofish can be identified by a gravid spot they possess on the posterior of their abdomens. Other species considered similar to G. affinis include Poecilia reticulata, Poecilia latipinna, and Xiphophorus maculatus; they are commonly misidentified as mosquitofish.

== Naming and taxonomy ==
The mosquitofish is a member of the family Poeciliidae of order Cyprinodontiformes. The genus name Gambusia is derived from the Cuban Spanish term gambusino, meaning "useless". The common name, mosquitofish, is derived from their use for biological control of mosquitoes, which itself was based on early observations that, in certain circumstances, they can reduce mosquito abundances. Classification of the western mosquitofish has been difficult due to their similarity to the eastern mosquitofish, and according to ITIS (Integrated Taxonomic Information System), G. holbrooki (eastern mosquitofish) may be an invalid taxonomic name, and could be considered a subspecies of G. affinis.

== Diet ==
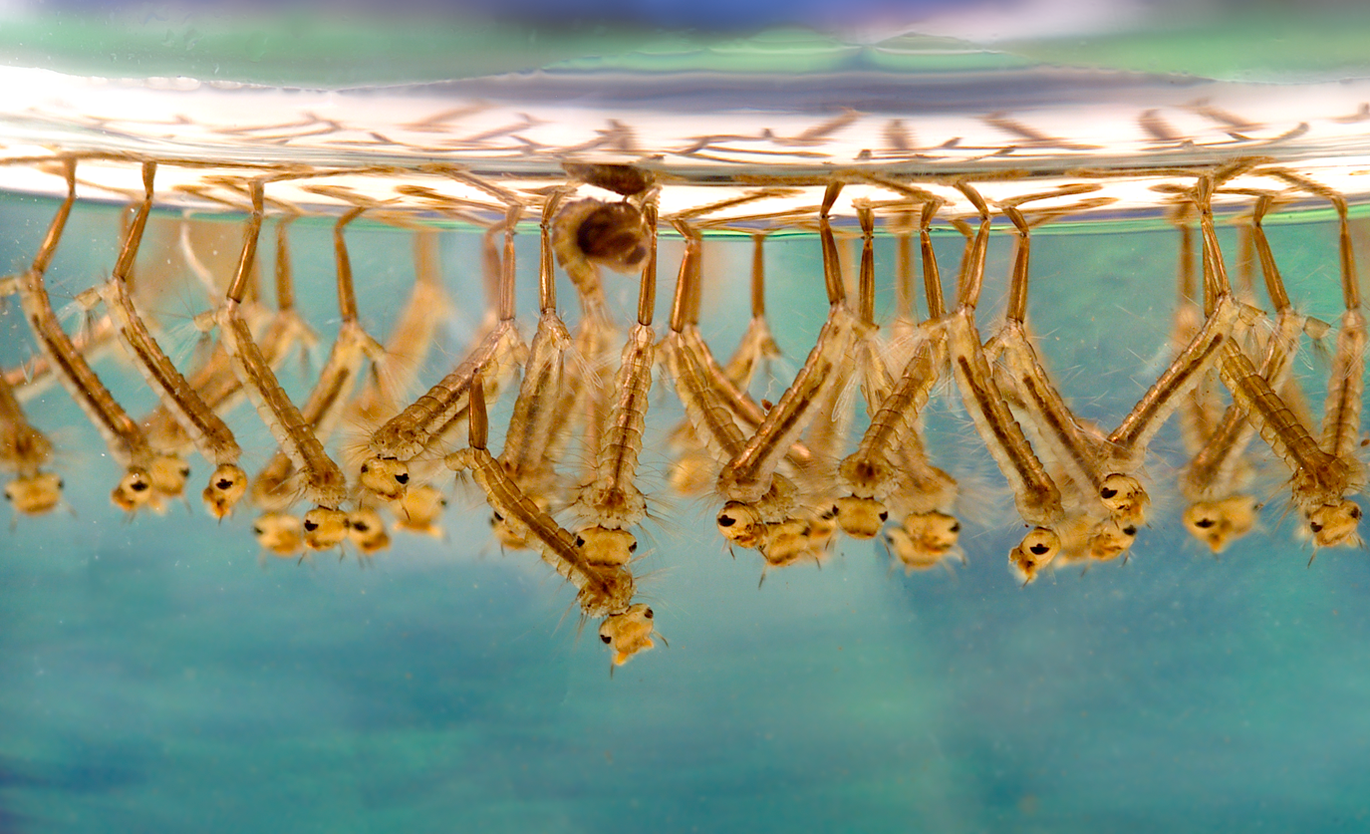
Mosquito larvae

Mosquitofish are diet generalists, but they are considered "larvivorous" because they consume the larvae of mosquitoes and other aquatic insects. Their diet consists of zooplankton, small insects and insect larvae, and detritus material. Mosquitofish feed on mosquito larvae at all stages of life, if mosquito larvae are available in the environment. Adult females can consume up to hundreds of mosquito larvae in one day. Maximum consumption rate in a day by one mosquitofish has been observed to be from 42%–167% of its own body weight. However, they can suffer mortality if fed only mosquito larvae, and survivors of this diet show poor growth and maturation. As generalists, mosquitofish have also shown cannibalistic behavior on the young of their own species.

== Habitat ==
The native range of the mosquitofish is from southern parts of Illinois and Indiana, throughout the Mississippi River and its tributary waters, to as far south as the Gulf Coast in the northeastern parts of Mexico. They are found most abundantly in shallow water protected from larger fish. Mosquitofish can survive relatively inhospitable environments, and are resilient to low oxygen concentrations, high salt concentrations (up to twice that of sea water), and temperatures up to 42 °C (108 °F) for short periods. Because of their notable adaptability to harsh conditions and their global introduction into many habitats for mosquito control, they have been described as the most widespread freshwater fish in the world. Some of their natural predators include the bass, catfish and bluegill.

== Global invasion history and environmental impact ==
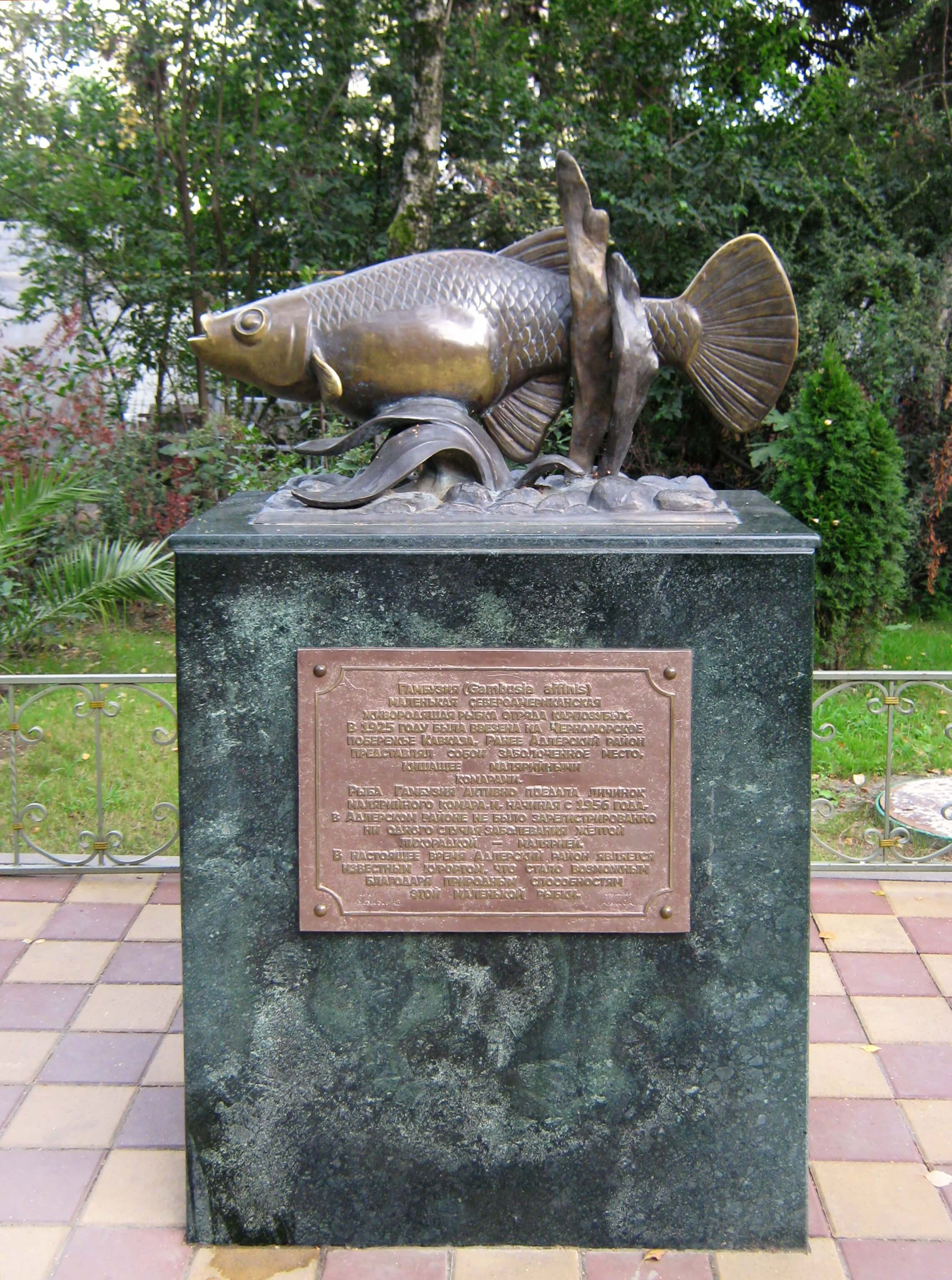
Monument constructed in Sochi honouring the mosquito fish for eradicating malaria in the region

Mosquitofish were intentionally introduced in many areas with large mosquito populations to decrease the population of mosquitoes by eating the mosquito larvae. However, retrospectively, many introductions could be considered ill-advised; in most cases native fishes supplied control of mosquito populations, and introducing mosquitofish has been harmful to indigenous aquatic life. Mosquitofish introduction outside of their native range can also be harmful to ecosystems. Mosquitofish can consume or injure other small fish or otherwise harm them through competition. The ecological impacts of mosquitofish are partly dictated by their sex ratio, which can vary dramatically across their introduced range. Mosquitofish in Australia are considered noxious pests where they pose a threat to native fish and frog populations and little evidence indicates they have controlled mosquito populations or mosquito-borne diseases. They have been dubbed by scientists as "one of the most problematic animals on the planet".

However, from the 1920s to the 1950s, mosquitofish were considered by some to be a significant factor in eradicating malaria in South America, southern Russia, and Ukraine. Mosquitofish bred by Joice Loch were distributed through Greece, Serbia and the Middle east. On the coast of the Black Sea in Russia, the mosquitofish is commemorated for eradicating malaria by a monument in Sochi.

Mosquitofish are still employed for biological control of mosquitoes in some places. In 2008, in some parts of California and in Clark County, Nevada, mosquitofish were bred in aquariums so people could stock stagnant pools of water with the mosquitofish to reduce the number of West Nile virus cases.

Through species distribution models, it has been revealed that G. affinis exhibit significant niche expansions beyond their natural climatic ranges, with a notable shift towards tropical regions in Asia. These findings highlight the ecological flexibility of these species, contributing to their extensive success and posing a substantial risk for further range expansion. Furthermore, it is assumed that the species will continue to spread in the course of climate change.

In the European Union, due to the significant negative impacts of its introduction to the ecosystem, it is included in the list of invasive alien species of Union concern and hence cannot be imported, bred, transported, commercialized, or intentionally released into the environment in any of its member states.

== Reproduction ==
Reproduction of the mosquitofish starts with the male arranging the rays of the gonopodium (modified anal fin) into a slight tube. The male mosquitofish uses this tubular fin to secrete milt into the female's genital aperture in the process of internal fertilization. The female's genital aperture is located just behind the anal fin and is an opening for the milt to fertilize the ova within the ovary. Mosquitofish are within the infraclass Teleostei and as all teleosts, mosquitofish lack a uterus, so production of oocytes and gestation occur within the ovary of a female mosquitofish. Inside the female, sperm from multiple males can be stored to later fertilize ova. Based on laboratory experiments, female mosquitofish become vitellogenic when springtime temperatures reach 14 °C (57 °F), and then the oocytes mature when the average temperature reaches about 18 °C (64 °F). Then late in the summer when the photoperiod is less than 12.5 hours long, the next clutch of oocytes develops. In one reproductive season, a female may fertilize, with stored milt, two to six broods of embryos, with the size of the brood decreasing as the season progresses. Reproduction rates are highly dependent on temperature and ration level. As temperature increases from 20 to 30 °C, mean age at first reproduction decreases from 191 to 56 days, and brood size and mass of offspring increase significantly. Interbrood interval estimates at 25 and 30 °C are 23 and 19 days, respectively.

== Embryology ==
Mosquitofish have a 16- to 28-day gestation period. They are lecithotrophic, which means during gestation, nutrients are provided to the embryos by a yolk sac. If the gestation period is shorter, each newborn will at birth still have a yolk sac connected through a slit located on the ventral side of the body wall. Brood size of females depends on the size of the given female; larger females are more capable of a larger brood quantity than smaller females. Many females have a brood quantity of up to or more than 60 young. Mosquitofish are viviparous, which means after the gestation of a brood, the female will have live birth. In most cases, the newborn brood will have an equal male to female sex ratio.

== Growth ==
After birth, newborn mosquitofish are about 8 to 9 mm (0.31 to 0.35 in) in length. As juveniles, they grow at a rate of about 0.2 mm (0.0079 in) per day, but growth is highly temperature-dependent. Growth rates of juvenile mosquitofish reach their peak when the water temperature is within a range of 24 to 30 °C (75 to 86 °F), depending on resource availability. As temperatures rise above or dip below this range, growth rates decrease. Consistent temperatures at or above 35 °C (95 °F) are typically lethal, while growth stops when temperatures are at or below 10 °C (50 °F). For male mosquitofish, sexual maturity is reached in about 43 to 62 days, but maturation age is also dependent on temperature and resources. Female mosquitofish reach sexual maturity in about 21 to 28 days if born early within the reproductive season. The lifespan of a mosquitofish averages less than a year and the maximum is about 1.5 years. However, mosquitofish kept as pets can live much longer, with owners reporting lifespans of over three years. Male mosquitofish lifespans are considerably shorter than females.

== Bibliography ==
- Vinogradova, Elena Borisovna (2000). Culex pipiens pipiens mosquitoes: taxonomy, distribution, ecology, physiology, genetic, applied importance and control. Pensoft Publishers. ISBN 978-954-642-103-6.
- Wallus, Robert; Simon, T.P. (1990). Reproductive Biology and Early Life History of Fishes in the Ohio River Drainage. Taylor & Francis. ISBN 978-0-8493-1921-1.
