= Ergeta archaeological site =

- ერგეტის არქეოლოგიური ძეგლები (Georgian)
- Location within Georgia Location within Asia Location within Europe
- 42°22′55.9″N 41°40′35.6″E
- Type: Archaeological
- Periods: Bronze Age to Hellenistic
- Location: Ergeta
- Region: Zugdidi Municipality, Georgia
- Part of: Colchian culture

The Ergeta archaeological site (Georgian: ერგეტის არქეოლოგიური ძეგლები) is a multi-period complex situated in the village of Ergeta, within Zugdidi Municipality in western Georgia. It preserves a rich, stratified record of human occupation in ancient Colchis, spanning more than two millennia. Since systematic excavations began in 1978, archaeologists have identified over twenty settlement mounds — locally known as dikhagudzuba — providing evidence of continuous cultural activity from the early 2nd millennium BCE through the Hellenistic period.

Discoveries include timber-framed dwellings from the Bronze Age, lavishly equipped cemeteries from the Early Iron Age, and a Hellenistic settlement featuring both locally produced and imported artifacts. The site's diverse material culture — from agricultural tools and domestic pottery to scarabs and luxury imports — underscores Ergeta's significance as both a regional hub and a link in far-reaching Eurasian and Mediterranean exchange networks.

== Location ==
Ergeta is situated on the Odishi Lowland between the Enguri and Churia rivers, 8 km inland from the Black Sea coast and 28 km from the city of Zugdidi. Systematic archaeological investigations, ongoing since 1978 following reports by local resident Bondo Mamporia and led by Rezo Papuashvili under Teimuraz Mikeladze's Colchis Expedition, have revealed continuous occupation from the early 2nd millennium BCE through the 2nd–1st centuries BCE.

== Mound and plain settlements ==
Over twenty mounded tells, known in the local Mingrelian language as dikhagudzuba, dot the village and its environs. On one of these mounds — the Mamuliebi mound — archaeologists uncovered remains of early 2nd millennium BCE timber‑framed buildings containing carbonized botanical remains (wheat, millet, grapes, walnuts) and faunal bones (pig, cattle, deer, wild goat, birds). Associated finds include diverse ceramics, a bronze socketed axehead, and clay casting molds for metal objects. The same mound yielded an Early Iron Age cultural layer with native ceramics, metal artifacts, and small Egyptian faience scaraboid plaques inscribed with hieroglyphs, indicating early Mediterranean contacts.

More than fifty habitation layers dating to Antiquity have been identified across the adjacent plain. Of these, one Hellenistic settlement datable to the 4th–3rd centuries BCE features locally produced pottery alongside Greek imports — including Sinopian roof tiles and louteria, Thasian amphorae, and other wares — demonstrating integration into broader Black Sea trade networks. A significant gap in occupation is evident from the 2nd–1st centuries BCE until the 19th century CE, attributed to environmental changes, especially rising sea levels.

== Burial grounds ==
Four Late Bronze–Early Iron Age (first half of the 1st millennium BCE) cemeteries (designated N1–N4) have been fully excavated. Each displays a unique structure characteristic of Colchian cemeteries from this period, combining ritual enclosures (cult squares) with collective pit burials. Cult squares are surface structures containing cremation ovens, bone pits, sacrificial items with fire traces, and ritual debris. Collective pit graves contained subterranean wooden chambers accessed via an entrance passage, holding up to 2,000 individuals per chamber (according to osteological analysis). Bodies were interred with grave goods and food, showing no evidence of burning.

== Material culture ==
Excavations across the settlement mounds and necropoleis produced an important array of artifacts, aiding in the understanding of Colchian society — particularly the evolution of metallurgy. Grave sequences reveal five distinct phases: from ceramics only (Phase 1), to isolated iron (Phase 2), iron imitating bronze (Phase 3), divergent iron daggers (Phase 4), and innovative iron tools (Phase 5). Evidence includes hundreds of locally produced bronze and iron weapons (axes, daggers, spearheads, arrowheads), containers, and tools. Over 400 regional iron workshops indicate overproduction and export; hundreds of iron hoes and ploughshares per grave illustrate a tradition of ritual hoarding.

In addition, the site has yielded one of the oldest gold artifacts in the South Caucasus dated to the 8th century BC — three centuries older than those found in the aristocratic graves of Vani and Sairkhe. Extensive jewelry (gold, silver, tin-incrusted carnelian and amber), anthropomorphic (rider goddesses) and zoomorphic ritual figurines, imported beads and stamp seals (glass, paste, faience) from Iran, Anatolia, Egypt, and the Mediterranean, as well as Scythian akinakes daggers and arrowheads, confirm diverse Eurasian networks.

All excavated material is conserved in three Georgian museums: the Dadiani Palaces Historical-Architectural Museum (Zugdidi), the Poti Colchian Culture Museum, and the Simon Janashia Museum of the Georgian National Museum (Tbilisi).
