= Dolmens of the North Caucasus =

Concentrations of megaliths in Asia and Europe

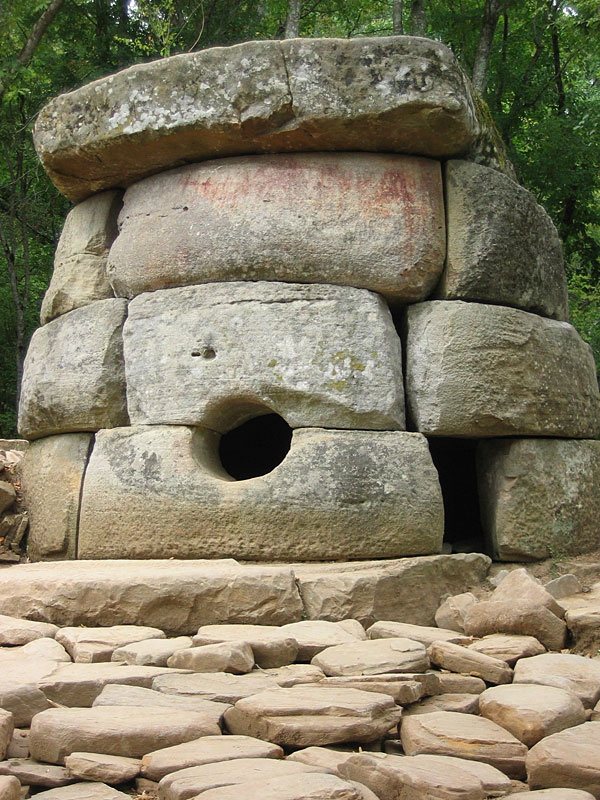
Dolmen near the Zhane river

Concentrations of megaliths, dolmens (Adyghe: исп-унэ) and stone labyrinths dating between the end of the 4th millennium and the beginning of the 2nd millennium B.C. have been found (but little studied) throughout the Caucasus Mountains, including Abkhazia, Georgia. Most of them are represented by rectangular structures made of stone slabs or cut in rocks with holes in their facade. These dolmens cover the Western Caucasus on both sides of the mountain ridge, in an area of approximately 12,000 square kilometres of Russia and Abkhazia.

The Caucasian dolmens represent a unique type of prehistoric architecture, built with precisely dressed large stone blocks. The stones were, for example, shaped into 90-degree angles, to be used as corners or were curved to make a circle.

While generally unknown in the rest of Eurasia, these structures are equal to the great megaliths of Eurasia in terms of age and quality of architecture, but are still of an unknown origin. In spite of the variety of Caucasian monuments, they show strong similarities with megaliths from different parts of Eurasia, like the Iberian Peninsula, Italy, France, Great Britain, Ireland, Netherlands, Germany, Denmark, Sweden, Iran and India. A range of hypotheses has been put forward to explain these similarities and the building of megaliths on the whole, but still it remains unclear.

Approximately 3,000 of these megalithic monuments are known in the Western Caucasus, but more are constantly being found, while some are being destroyed. Today, many are in great disrepair and will be completely lost if they are not protected from vandals and general neglect. The North Caucasus Dolmens make up a lost city by the shore of the Black Sea. The dolmens could have been vaults of metal objects or jewelry that were pillaged by the invading Scythians around the first millennium BC. The dolmens could have been of spiritual significance, and are becoming cherished again today.

== Architecture of Circassian dolmens ==
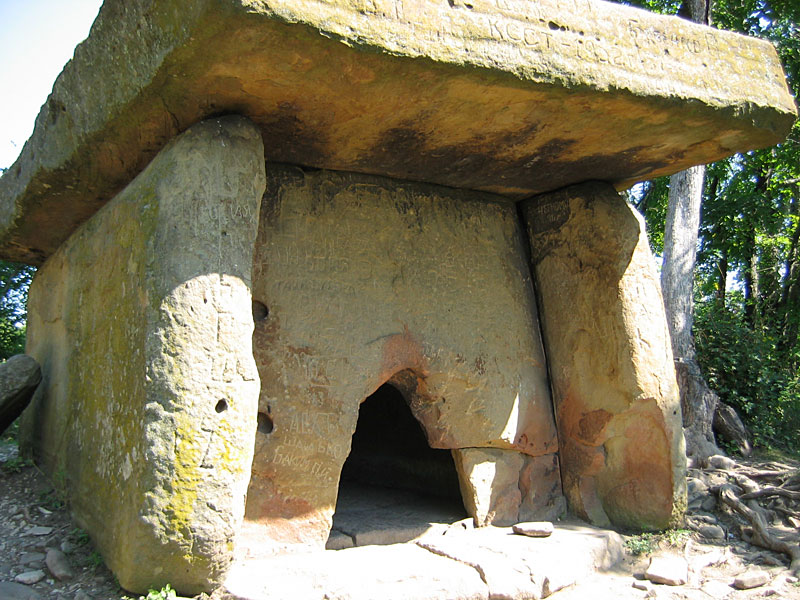
A dolmen near Gelendzhik.

The dolmens have a limited variety in their architecture. The floor plans are square, trapezoidal, rectangular and round. All of the dolmens are punctuated with a portal in the centre of the facade. While round portholes are the most common, square ones are also found. In front of the facade is a court that usually splays out, creating an area where rituals possibly took place. The court is usually outlined by large stone walls, sometimes over a meter high, which enclose the court. It is in this area that Bronze and Iron Age pottery has been found - which helped date these sites -, along with human remains, bronze tools and silver, gold and semi-precious stone ornaments.

The repertoire of decoration for these megalithic structures is not extensive. Vertical and horizontal zigzags, hanging triangles and concentric circles are the most common motifs. One decorative motif that is quite common is found across the top of the porthole slab. It can best be described as a lintel held up by two columns. Pairs of breasts, done in relief, have also been found on a few dolmens. These breasts usually appear above the two columns of the porthole decoration. Perhaps related to these are the stone plugs, which were used to block the porthole, and are found with almost every tomb. They are sometimes phallic-shaped.

Some unusual items associated with dolmens are big round stone balls, double balls and animal sculptures.

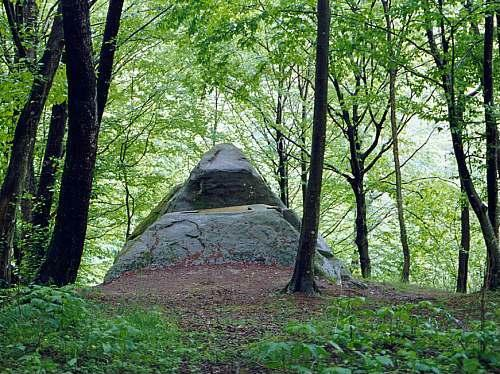
Dolmen pyramid in Mamed Canyon

One of the most interesting megalithic complexes – group of three dolmens - stands in a row on a hill above Zhane River on the Black Sea coast in the Krasnodar area near Gelendzhik, Russia. In this area there is a great concentration of all types of megalithic sites including settlements and dolmen cemeteries. Large stone mounds surrounded the two monuments.

The central dolmen is rectangular in plan, 4 x 4 meters, while the two flanking dolmens are circular, 4 and 5 meters in diameter. The two round dolmens had been bulldozed - probably in the 1950s - in order to harvest the surrounding trees, but the main structure of the central dolmen had not been damaged.

Another (fourth) dolmen near the Zhane River has a secret entrance at the back of the chamber, and a façade, dummy entrance and courtyard at the front of the dolmen. There in addition to these pristine dolmens were some ruined dolmens.

== Associated cultures ==
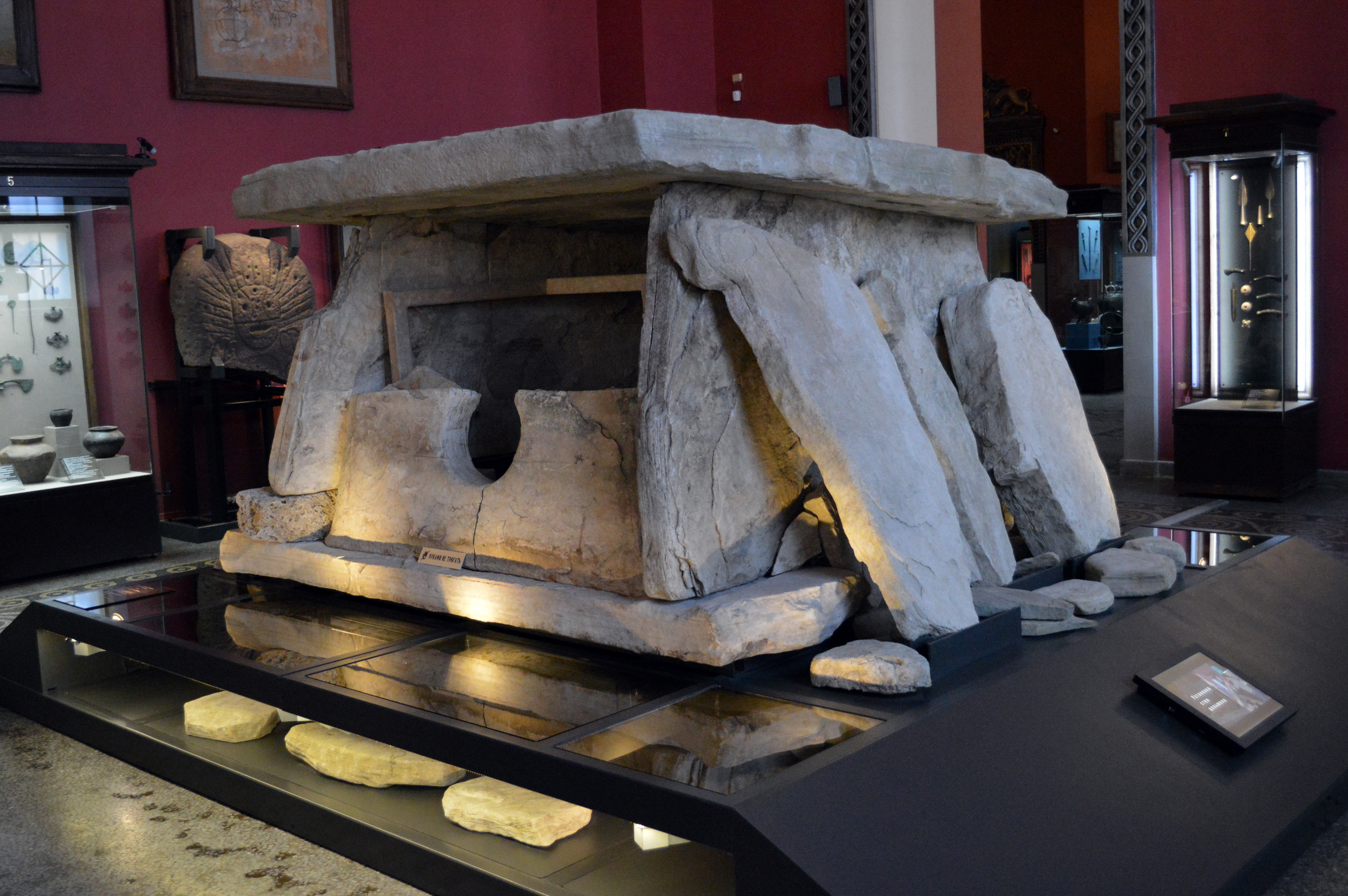
Dolmen in the Moscow State Historical Museum, 3rd-2nd millennium BC

The Caucasus dolmens are associated with the Klin-Yar community and the Koban culture. A genetic study in 2020 analysing samples from Klin-Yar communities, including the Koban culture, had haplogroup J1 and haplogroup G-M285.

== Other Russian megalithic sites ==
Other important megalithic sites of Russia have been found along Russia's northern shores with the White Sea and the Barents Sea as well as at Vera Island.

== See also ==
- Megalithic art
- List of megalithic sites
