= Colchian culture =

Neolithic culture of the western Caucasus

Ancient Kingdom of Colchis

The Colchian culture is a Bronze and Iron Age archaeological culture centered in western Georgia, which flourished from approximately 2700 BCE to 700 BCE. It developed following environmental shifts that enabled more permanent settlement along the Black Sea coastline and further inland. It is divided into Proto-Colchian and Early Colchian phases, later succeeded by Classical-era Greek colonization. Distinguished by wood-based architecture, marshland adaptations, and varied burial rites, Colchian sites — like Pichori and Ergeta — offer a deep archaeological record. The culture is notable for its bronze and iron metallurgy, ritual drinking vessels, and peculiar ceramics. Strong regional interactions with the Koban culture and others reflect broad cultural networks.

== Geography and periodization ==
Due to extensive wetlands and the transformation of open lagoons into an alluvial plain between the 4th and mid-2nd millennium BC, favorable conditions for permanent settlement in the western Georgian lowlands emerged only shortly before the 2nd millennium BC. From the Early Bronze Age through the Early Iron Age, a distinct archaeological tradition developed in this region—encompassing both the lowlands and adjacent foothills, and extending south along the Black Sea coast to modern-day Ordu in Turkey. Named after Colchis, the ancient Greek name for the eastern Black Sea littoral, this culture is divided into two main phases: Proto-Colchian (c. 2700–1600 BC) and Early or Ancient Colchian (c. 1600–700/600 BC), with the terms emphasizing cultural continuity between them. These phases were followed by the final Colchian period of Classical antiquity, during which Greek colonies were established in western Georgia in the 6th century BC.

== Settlements and burial grounds ==
The Colchian culture is known from numerous burial grounds, settlements, metalworking workshops, and hoards of metal artifacts. A key site that preserves the entire Colchian sequence, from the 3rd millennium BC to the 4th–3rd centuries BC, is Pichori, located near the mouth of the Inguri River.

Architecture in the Colchian culture was primarily wood-based, often with wattle-and-daub walls. In the humid and marshy littoral zones, dwellings were constructed on platforms of thick wooden beams or atop clay mounds. Others stood on natural elevations or artificial mounds. Later, in the Early Iron Age, dune settlements appeared on sandy coastlines, along with open, unfortified settlements on riverbanks and terraces. Ditches were often dug around the perimeters of these sites before construction began. Burial practices were notably diverse, ranging from shaft graves in central Colchis to megalithic dolmens in northern Abkhazia. Both individual burials—in pits, stone cists, or ceramic jars—and collective interments were practiced, with either complete or partial cremation.

== Metallurgy ==
A defining feature of the Early Colchian culture, distinguishing it from the Proto-Colchian phase, is a rich and highly developed bronze inventory, often deposited as hoards. This includes distinctive axes with incised geometric or zoomorphic decoration, hoes, sheet-metal belts, animal-shaped pendants, and elaborately decorated pins. The main centers of metallurgy were located in the Chorokhi River basin, in Abkhazia, and in the mountainous regions of Racha and Lechkhumi, with significant local variation. Ceramic production evolved from mostly hand-made, black-polished and coarse pottery to decorated, wheel-made wares with broad vertical fluting and zoomorphic handles. A noteworthy element of Colchian material culture is its ritual drinking tradition, as evidenced by finely crafted drinking vessels.

Archaeological evidence for the origins of iron production in the South Caucasus remains fragmentary. Numerous early metal production sites — previously identified by scholars such as David Khakhutaishvili as early ironworking centers — have been reassessed as copper-smelting installations, active primarily between 1300 and 800 BC in areas such as the Supsa and Gubazeuli river valleys.

By the 8th–7th centuries BC, Colchian metalsmiths — drawing on long-standing metallurgical expertise — began producing iron artifacts in substantial quantities. Over time, bronze working was increasingly relegated to the manufacture of jewelry. (Note: The Greek authors of Antiquity mention the Chalybes, a people famed for their ironworking skills, located somewhere in the southeastern Black Sea region. This designation may have referred to local communities of highly skilled metalworkers rather than a distinct ethnic group.)

The Colchian culture bordered and shared numerous forms of metalwork with the contemporaneous Koban culture of the north-central Caucasus (c. 1400–600 BC), as well as with the site of Tlia in the southern foothills of the central Greater Caucasus, reflecting a robust network of cultural interaction. Similarities with eastern Georgian traditions — such as zoomorphic-handled pottery in Shida Kartli — may indicate Colchian expansion into parts of eastern Georgia during the Early Iron Age.
