= Klin-Yar =

- Location within Russia
- 43°54′N 42°43′E
- Type: Settlement & cemetery
- Cultures: Koban, Sarmatian, Alanic
- Location: Stavropol, Russia

Site notes
- Excavation dates: 1960-2000

Klin-Yar (or Klin-Jar) is a prehistoric and early medieval site in the North Caucasus, outside of Kislovodsk. It was first discovered in the 1980s. Archaeological excavations had uncovered settlement traces and extensive cemetery areas starting in the 8th century BC, belonging to the Koban culture. The site was used up to the 7th century AD. Its long use over all this period, its size and rich finds, as well as the data quality of recent excavations make Klin-Yar one of the most important archaeological sites of the region.

== Location and discovery ==
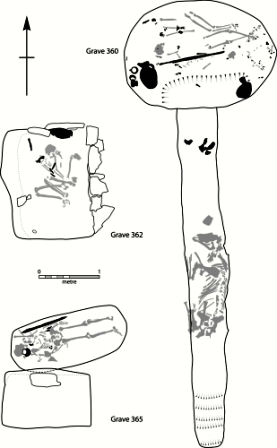
Grave types at Klin-Yar: Koban (upper left), Sarmatian (lower left) and Alanic (right) (drawn by M. Mathews)

Klin-Yar (the Russian name means "Crooked Valley") is located about 3 kilometres (1.9 mi) west of the spa town of Kislovodsk, in a small curving valley which is separated from the valley of the river Podkumok by a long narrow sandstone formation locally called "Parovoz" ("The Locomotive"). Settlements and cemeteries have been found on the slopes around the base of the rock, with some settlement traces on its flat top.

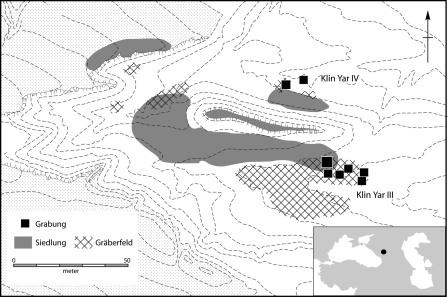
Location and site plan of Klin-Yar (drawn by M. Mathews; NB scale error: correct 500m, not 50m). Legend: Grabung - trench, Siedlung - settlement, Gräberfeld - cemetery

The site was discovered in the 1960s by the local archaeologist A.P. Runich. The construction of a cattle farm in the early 1980s led to rescue excavations, followed by research excavations by V.S. Flyorov (Moscow, Russia) from 1984, and by an Anglo-Russian team led by A.B. Belinskij (Stavropol, Russia) and H. Härke (Reading, UK) in 1993–1996. The total number of excavated graves is around 400; the full extent of the cemeteries is uncertain, but is probably somewhere between 1,000 and 3,000 graves.

These sites are located near the town of ru:Нежинский (Ставропольский край) (Nezshinski), in Stavropol Krai.

== First phase ==
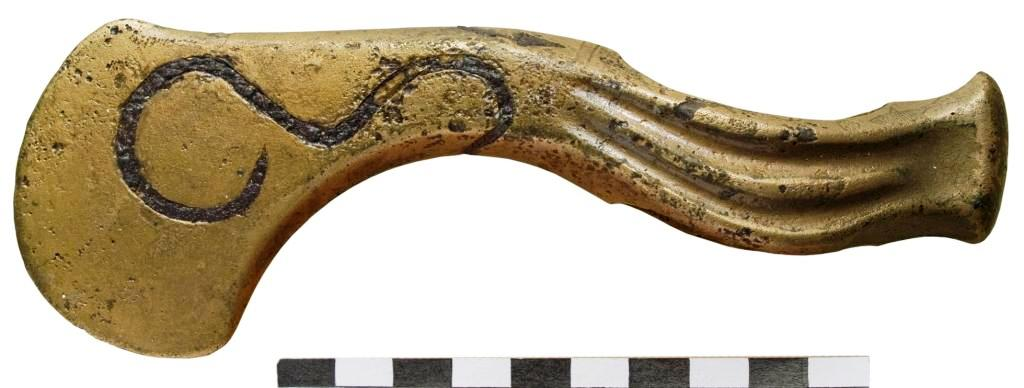
Bronze axe with iron inlay decoration from Klin-Yar (photo I. Kozhevnikov; scale: cm)

The first phase of the site belongs to the Late Bronze Age/Early Iron Age Koban culture. A settlement of this period was found along the southern slope of the rock where three buildings were excavated in 1995; pottery finds indicate that the top of the rock was also settled. The extensive cemetery areas overlap with the settlement at the eastern end of the south-facing slope. The burial rite of the Koban culture was inhumation in single graves, with the body deposited flexed on its side (usually males on their right side, females on their left). The provision of grave-goods was standardized: tools and weapons for men, hair decoration and bracelets for women. Special finds included two Assyrian helmets and a bronze axe decorated with iron inlay, indicating long-distance contacts and social differentiation.

== Second and third phases ==
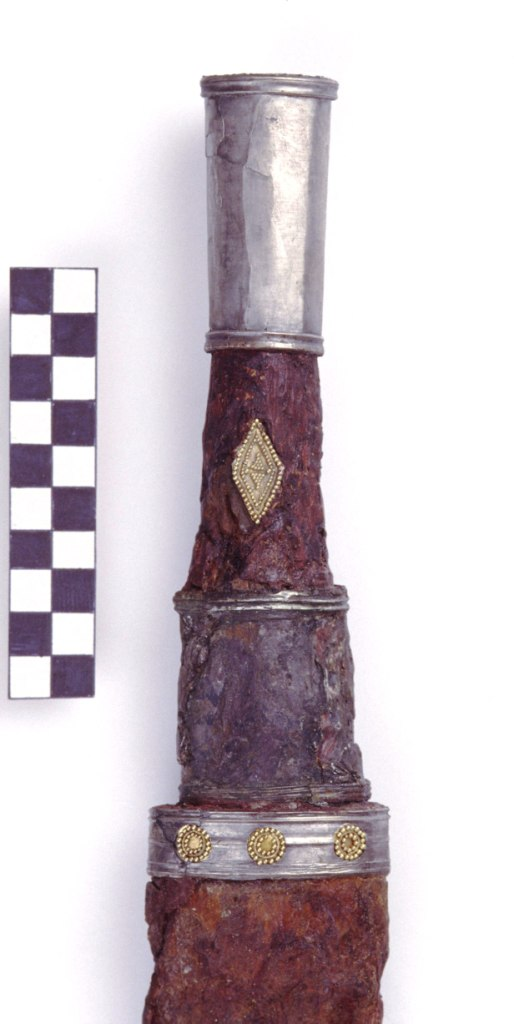
Early medieval sword from Alanic grave 360 at Klin-Yar (photo I. Kozhevnikov; scale: cm)

The second and third phases are characterized, respectively, by Sarmatians and Alans, both of them Iranian-speaking nomads from the Caspian steppes. Physical anthropology has shown that both groups were immigrants here: the Sarmatian immigration may have been male-only leading to mixing with the native (Koban) population, while the Alanic immigration clearly included males and females (according to the Anthropology Laboratory, Institute of Archaeology, Russian Academy of Sciences, Moscow).

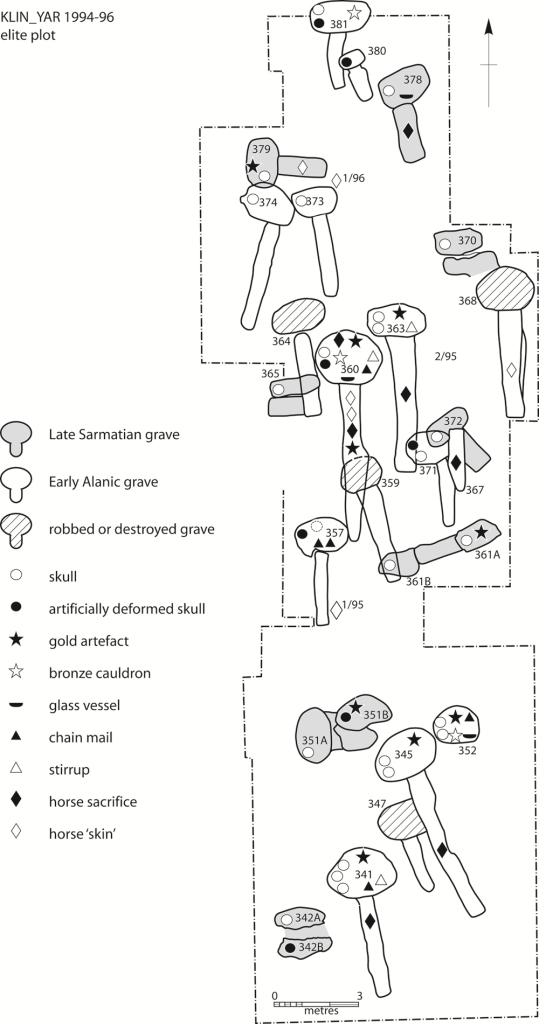
The Late Sarmatian-Alanic elite plot in the cemetery of Klin-Yar (drawn by M. Mathews)

There are no Sarmatian settlement finds from Klin-Yar. Sarmatian graves of the first four centuries AD are found among the Koban graves on the southern slope. The burial rite was inhumation in small underground chambers (catacombs), mostly single burials with grave-goods; the body was deposited extended on the back. Grave construction and burial ritual show great variety. Special finds include a Late Roman glass vessel and Egyptian fayence beads. A considerable proportion of the Sarmatian and Alanic graves were disturbed in antiquity; Flyorov has interpreted this as deliberate disturbance shortly after burial, intended to 'render the dead harmless'.

Settlement pottery of the Alanic period has been found on the southern and northern slopes, and on top of the rock. Alanic graves of the 5th – 7th/early 8th centuries AD are located on the southern slope (cemetery III), with further graves of the 7th/early 8th centuries AD on the northern slope (cemetery IV). The standard grave type is a large catacomb with an entrance corridor (dromos), usually with several burials in the chamber. The burial ritual is basically the same as in the Sarmatian period, but with a wider range of grave-goods and with more elaborate ritual (horse sacrifice, pottery depositions and traces of fire in the dromoi). Finds of special interest include a Central Asian type of sword with P-shaped scabbard fittings (Grave 360), an Iranian glass bowl (Grave 360), and gold coins of the Byzantine emperors Tiberius Mauritius (Maurice (emperor)) and Heraclius (Graves 341 and 363).

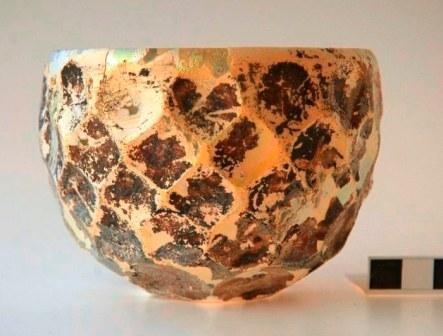
Iranian glass vessel from Alanic grave 360 at Klin-Yar (photo I. Kozhevnikov; scale: cm)

The richest Late Sarmatian and Early Alanic graves of the 4th – late 7th centuries AD are concentrated in an 'elite plot' in cemetery III on the southern slope. This is seen by the excavators as reflecting the rise to power of one or two families, perhaps even the beginnings of an Alanic nobility. The number of undisturbed rich graves of this period is unusual for the North Caucasus. The man and woman buried in Grave 360 (mid-7th century AD) must have belonged to the top of the Alanic social hierarchy in the North Caucasus. A significant proportion of the individuals buried in the 'elite plot' had artificial skull deformation which is often interpreted as a sign of high social status.

== Significance ==
The site has wider significance because its evidence shows the coincidence of cultural, ritual, economic and population changes over a long period of use. Finds show long-distance contacts of the communities at Klin-Yar: in the Koban period to the Black Sea, and across the Caucasus Mountains to Mesopotamia; in the Sarmatian period to the Eastern Roman Empire; and in the Alanic period to Central Asia, Iran, and the Byzantine Empire. A branch of the Silk Road is thought to have run along the Podkumok valley in the Alanic period, explaining some of the wealth and the contacts of this site. Klin–Yar is the first site in the North Caucasus where a so-called 'reservoir effect' in radiocarbon dating, was demonstrated in dates derived from human bones; the dates show irregular offsets caused by ancient carbon in the water of this volcanic region.

=== Genetic studies ===
A genetic study in 2020 analysing samples from Klin-Yar communities, including the Koban culture, found that the ancient population had a high frequency of paternal Haplogroup D-Z27276, which is associated with the modern Tibetan people. Other haplogroups were Haplogroup J1 and Haplogroup G-M285.
