= Vladimir Gelman =

Russian political scientist

Professor Vladimir Gelman
- Владимир Гельман
- Born: October 6, 1965 (age 61); Leningrad, Russian Soviet Federative Socialist Republic, Soviet Union
- Occupation: Political scientist
- Title: Finland Distinguished Professor

Academic background
- Education: Peter the Great St. Petersburg Polytechnic University; Candidate of Sciences at the Saint Petersburg State University

Academic work
- Institutions: European University at Saint Petersburg

Vladimir Yakovlevich Gelman (Russian: Владимир Яковлевич Гельман; born October 6, 1965) is a Russian political scientist and writer. Candidate of political science, professor at the European University at Saint Petersburg. He was an activist of the Russian democratic movement in Leningrad (now Saint-Petersburg) (1989-1996), a member of the Central Election Commission with an advisory vote from the Yabloko movement (1995).

Since 2012 — Finland Distinguished Professor at the University of Helsinki, head of the research direction "Authoritarian market society as a challenge" at the Centre for Russian Studies at the Aleksanteri Institute of the University of Helsinki. As a visiting lecturer, he lectured at the Central European University, the University of Texas at Austin, the Russian School of Economics, Pennsylvania State University.

== Biography ==
Vladimir graduated from the Kalinin Polytechnic Institute (now Peter the Great St. Petersburg Polytechnic University) with a degree in mechanical engineering in 1988. Candidate of political science (Saint Petersburg State University, 1998), thesis topic — "Transformation of the political regime and democratic opposition in post-communist Russia: analysis of modern transitological concepts."

- 1989—1990 — member of the Leningrad City Election Commission for the election of deputies of the Leningrad City Council of the 21st convocation
- 1990—1998 — research fellow at the St. Petersburg Branch of the Institute of Sociology of the Russian Academy of Sciences
- 1990—1991 — expert of the Leningrad City Council of People's Deputies
- 1992—1993 — consultant for information and analytical work at the Representation of the President of the Russian Federation in St. Petersburg,
- 1993—1996 — deputy director at the Institute for Humanitarian and Political Studies
- 1994—1997 — expert of the Yabloko faction of the State Duma of the Federal Assembly of the Russian Federation
- 1995—1998 — member of the commission with an advisory vote at the Central Election Commission of the Russian Federation
- 1996—2005 — Associate Professor at the European University at St. Petersburg, Faculty of Political Science and Sociology
- 2005—2023 — Professor at the European University at St. Petersburg, Faculty of Political Science and Sociology
- 2012—2022 — chairman of the International Advisory Council at the North-West Institute of Management, Russian Academy of National Economy and Public Administration, Faculty of International Relations and Political Studies
- 2012—2017 — Finland Distinguished Professor at the University of Helsinki, Aleksanteri Institute
- 2017 — present — Professor of Russian Politics at the University of Helsinki, Aleksanteri Institute

Author and editor of 20 books, author of over 150 scientific articles on the problems of contemporary Russian and post-Soviet politics. Member of editorial boards of the journals Political Studies, Vestnik Perm University. Political Science ”, European Political Science, International Journal of Urban and Regional Research, Post-Soviet Affairs, Demokratizatsiya, Russian Journal of Economics, Associate Editor of Russian Politics. Participates in various popular science projects, is engaged in journalism.

According to Russian political scientist Valery Fedorov, Vladimir Gelman is the most cited Russian political scientist in the world.

== Awards and honours ==
Winner of the annual competition of the journal Europe-Asia Studies (1999), the Russian Association of Political Sciences (2002, 2007, 2013) and the Russian Society of Sociologists (2011). Honorary doctor [Malmö University] (2024)
