= Koban culture =

Bronze and Iron Age culture

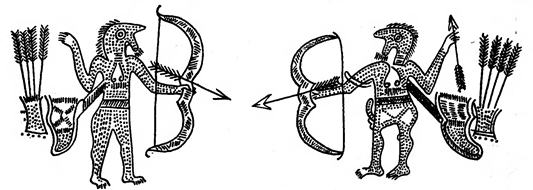
Archers with Scythian bows from Koban-Tli. The use of Scythian equipment reveals the nomadic origin of the Koban elite.

The Koban culture or Kuban culture (c. 1200 to 350 BC), is a late Bronze Age and Iron Age culture of the northern and central Caucasus. It is succeeded by the Colchian culture of the western Caucasus and the Kharachoi culture further east.

It is named after the village of Koban, Northern Ossetia, where in 1869 battle-axes, daggers, decorative items and other objects were discovered in a kurgan. Later, further sites were uncovered in the central Caucasus.

== Geographical extent ==
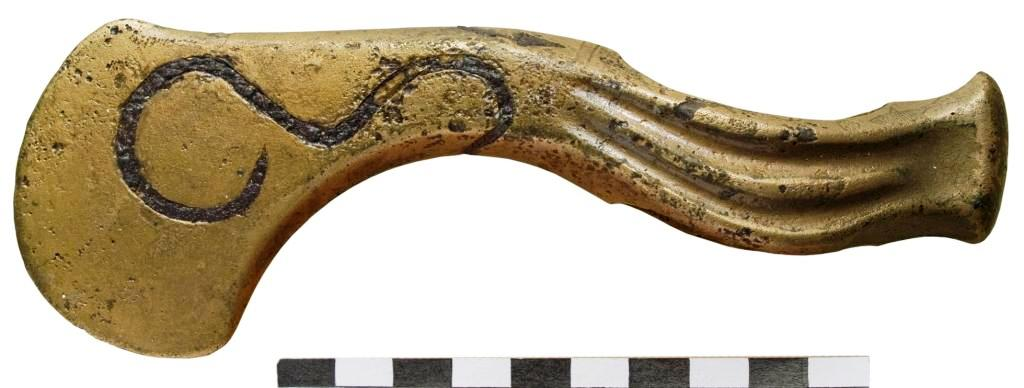
Bronze axe with iron inlay decoration from Klin-Yar, c. 700 BC

The culture flourished on both sides of the Great Caucasus Range, and extended into the areas of Ingushetia, Kabardino-Balkaria, Karachay-Cherkessia, and North Ossetia-Alania, and South Ossetia. It also reached the high north-western regions of Georgia such as Racha and Svaneti. Some areas of Northeast Caucasus also had Koban settlements, in particular the modern Ingushetia and the western regions of Chechnya.

To the north, the culture extended as far as the Terek River, and to the Laba River in the Krasnodar area.

== Description ==
The early phase of the Koban culture, especially in the west, possibly extends back as far as the 13th century BC, as the recent radiocarbon dates indicate.

The Koban culture settlements (as opposed to isolated cemeteries) have been little studied, with the exception of those located in the modern Chechnya, such as near Serzhen-Yurt, and near Bamut; these were major centers from around 11th century BC to around the 7th century BC.

The remains include dwellings, cobble bridges, altars, iron objects, bones, and clay and stone objects. There were sickles and stone grain grinders. Grains that were grown included wheat, rye and barley. Cattle, sheep, goats, donkeys, pigs and horses were kept. There were shops, where artisans worked on and sold pottery, stone-casting, bone-carving, and stone-carving. There is evidence for an advanced stage of metallurgy. There was differentiation of professionals organized within clans.

=== Tli cemetery ===
The Tli cemetery contained many rich burials. It is located near the village of Tli in South Ossetia, in the Tligom ravine (ru:Тлигомское ущелье). The excavations started at the end of the 19th century, and continued in 1955–1988. B. V. Tekhov excavated more than five hundred burials, with detailed publications.

The earliest burials at Tli cemetery go back to the 16th-14th centuries BC (pre-Koban period). Then the cemetery was used for almost the entire period of existence of the Koban culture.

== Ethnic affiliation ==
Koban culture and main contemporary polities in continental Asia.

Amjad Jaimoukha believes the Koban culture was primarily Nakh. He argues that while all these cultures probably were made by people included among the genetic ancestors of the Northern Caucasian Nakh (i.e. Chechens and Ingush), it was either the Koban or Kharachoi culture that was the first culture made by the cultural and linguistic ancestors of the Chechens (meaning the Chechens first arrived in their homeland 3000–4000 years ago). Jaimoukha postulates that the end of the Koban culture was brought about by Scythian invasions.

Johanna Nichols has written that, "There is fairly seamless archeological continuity for the last 8000 years or more in central Daghestan, suggesting that the Nakh-Daghestanian language family is long indigenous."

A genetic study in 2020 analysing the Koban culture samples from Klin-Yar and Zayukovo communities found that the ancient population had the Y-DNA haplogroups E1a2a1b1b, G2a1a1a2, D1a2a1, G2a1a and R1b1a1b. The mtDNA haplogroups found through the Illumina sequencing were J1b1, U5a1a2, HV1a1a, T1a1 and N. Through the Sanger sequencing, the mtDNA lines were H20a, J1c, N, U5a1a1h, HV1, T1a, H1e, W5a, R6/H1e, R6 and I1.

== The arts ==
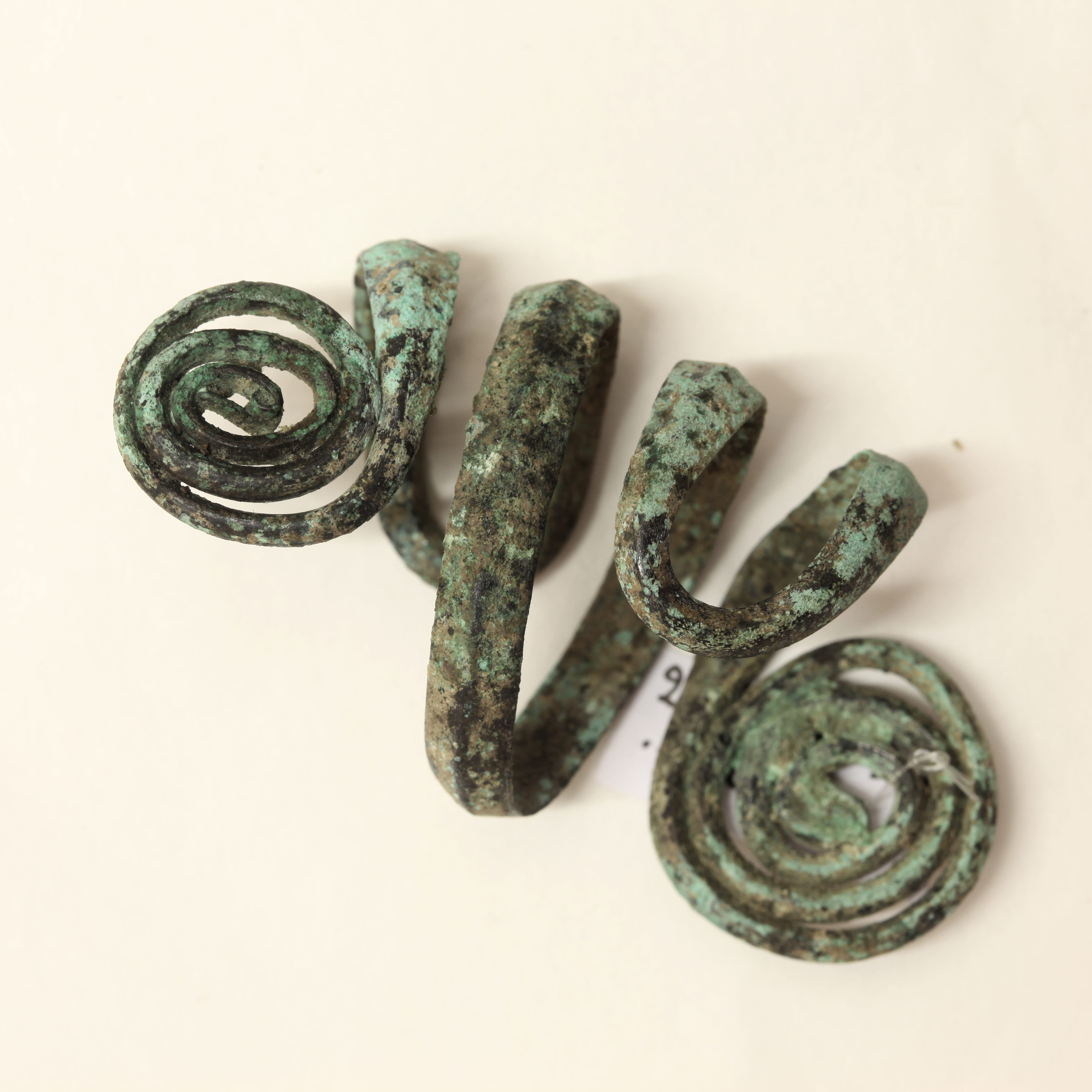
Ram-headed pendant of the Koban culture

The surviving bronze items reflect the high level of development of the artistic skills of the ancient masters. In museums and private collections there are objects with remnants of vitreous enamel, which confirm that they began to decorate metal products with fired enamel.

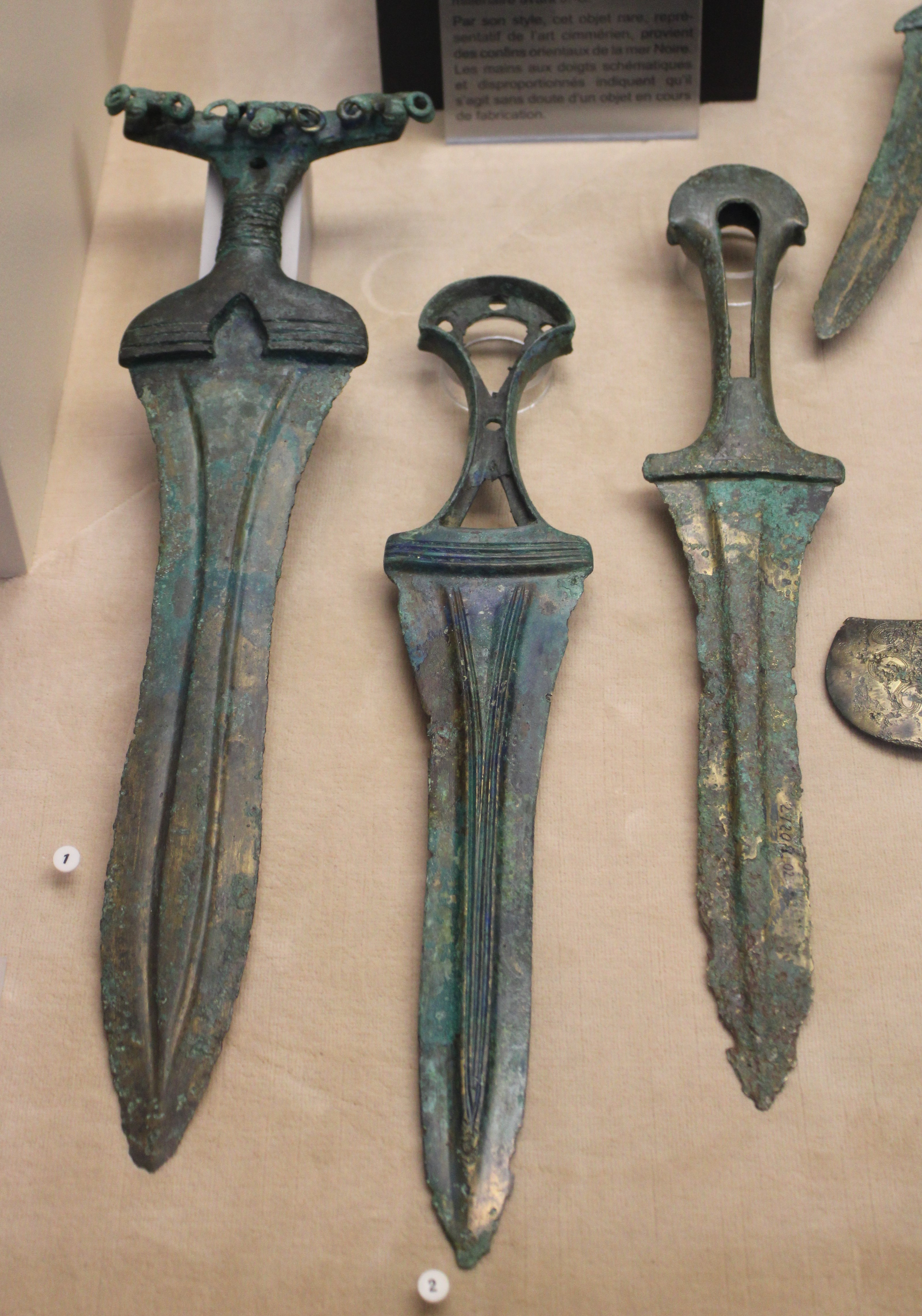
Bronze swords, c. 800-700 BC

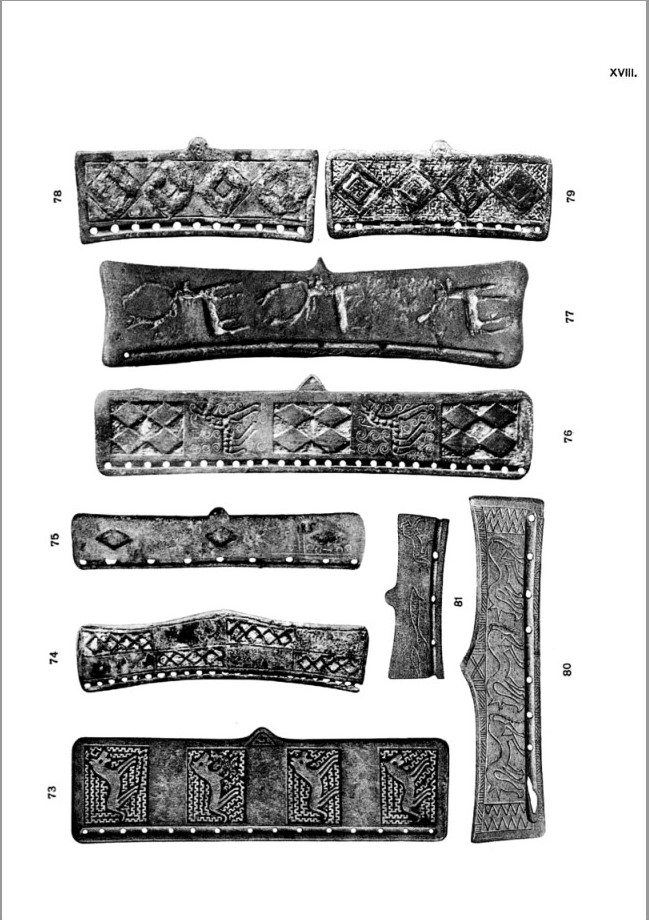
Bronze buckles with vitreous enamel

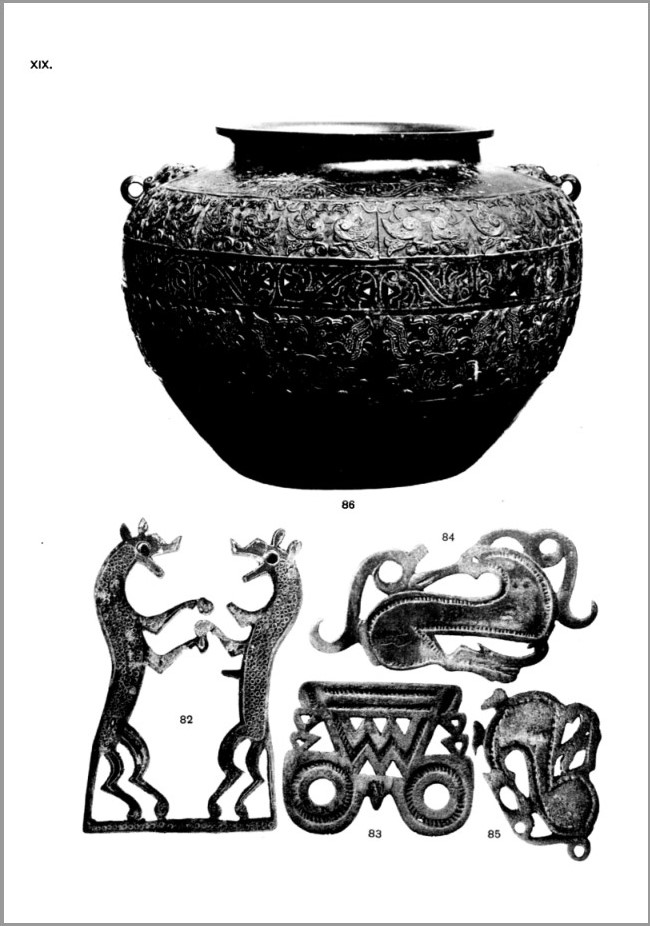
Bronze with remnants of vitreous enamel

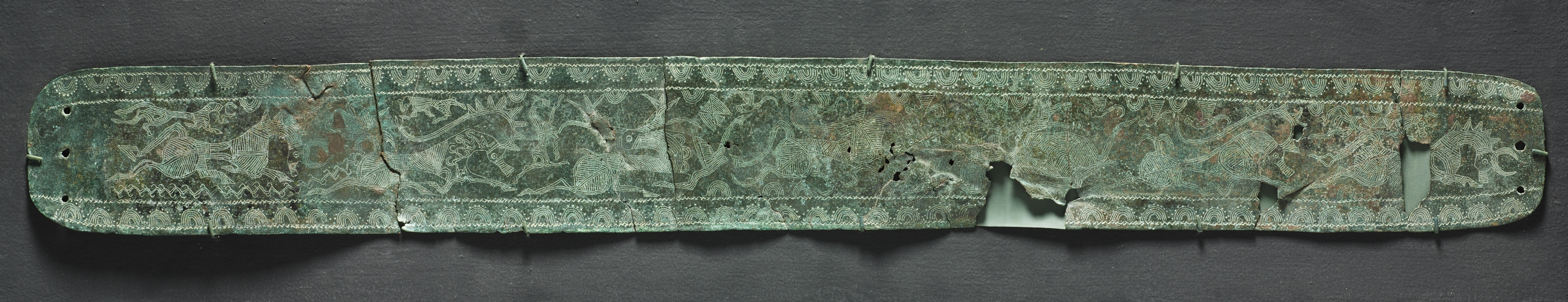
Decorated bronze belt

== See also ==
- Klin-Yar

== Bibliography ==
- Nikoloz Gobejishvil (2014), Interrelation of Colchian and Koban Cultures According to Burial Constructions and Funerary Customs (Late Bronze – Early Iron Age) spekali.tsu.ge
