= Caucasian Riviera =

Caucasian Riviera Черноморское побережье Кавказа (Russian) კავკასიური რივიერა (Georgian)
- Riviera
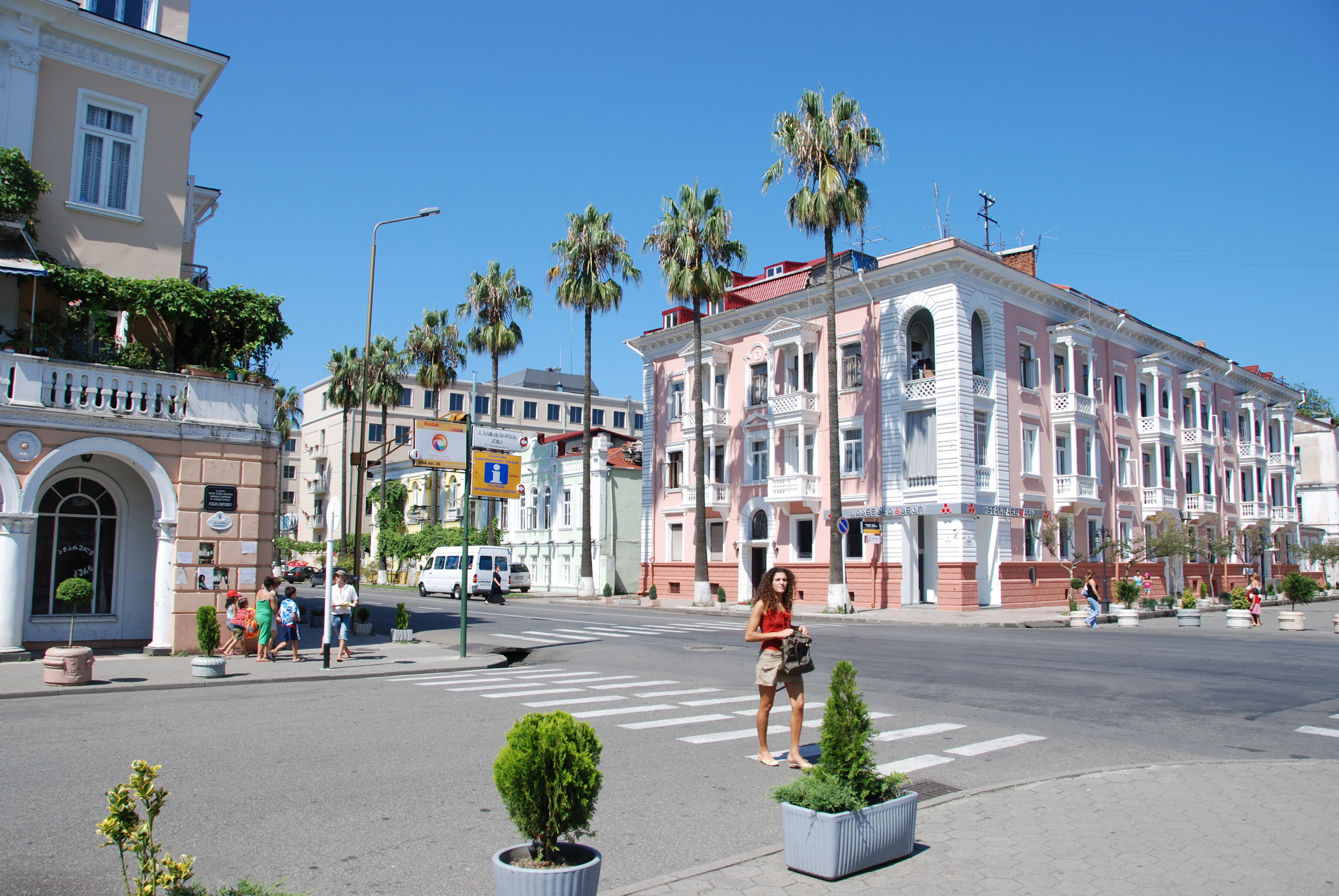
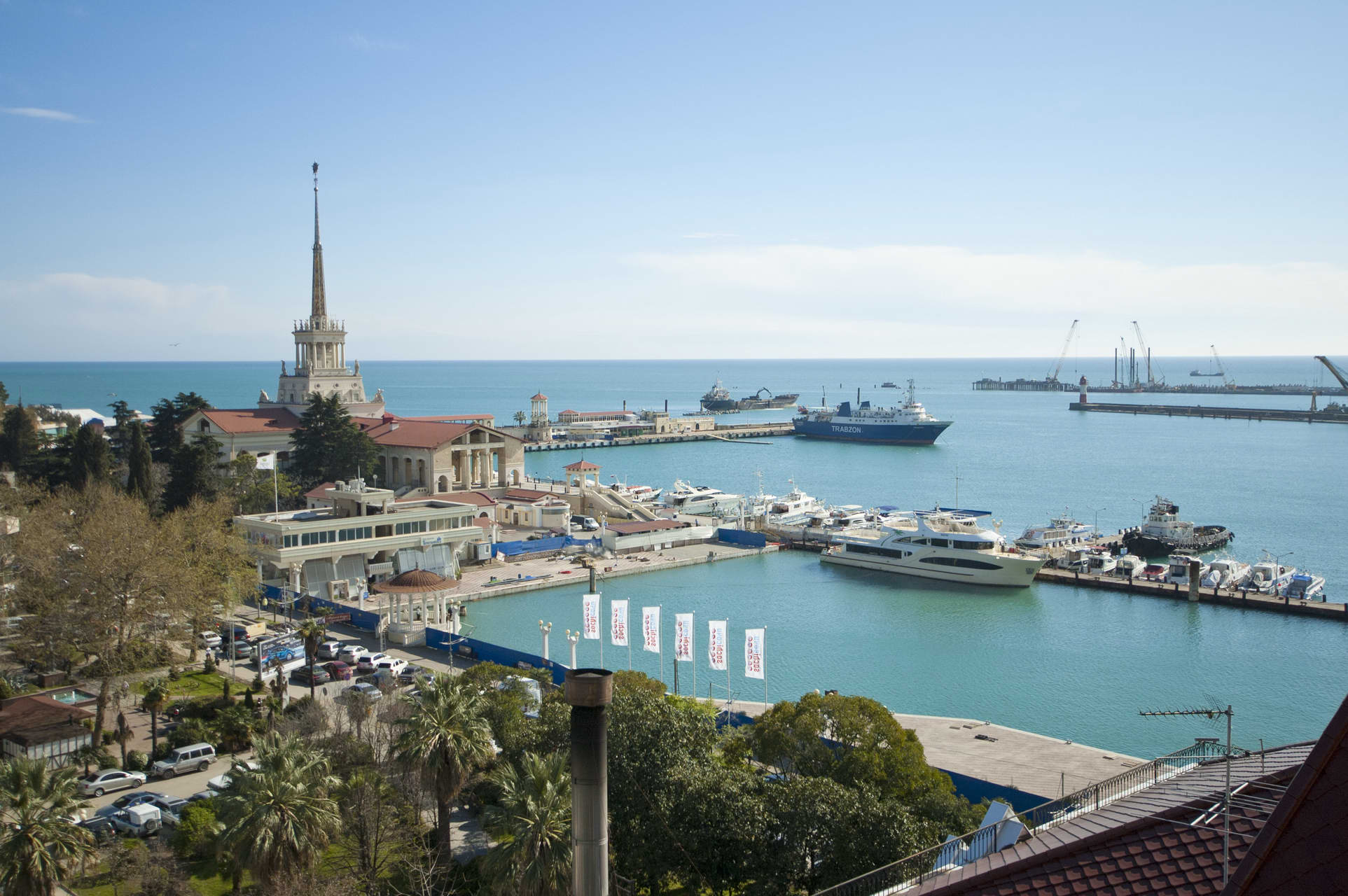
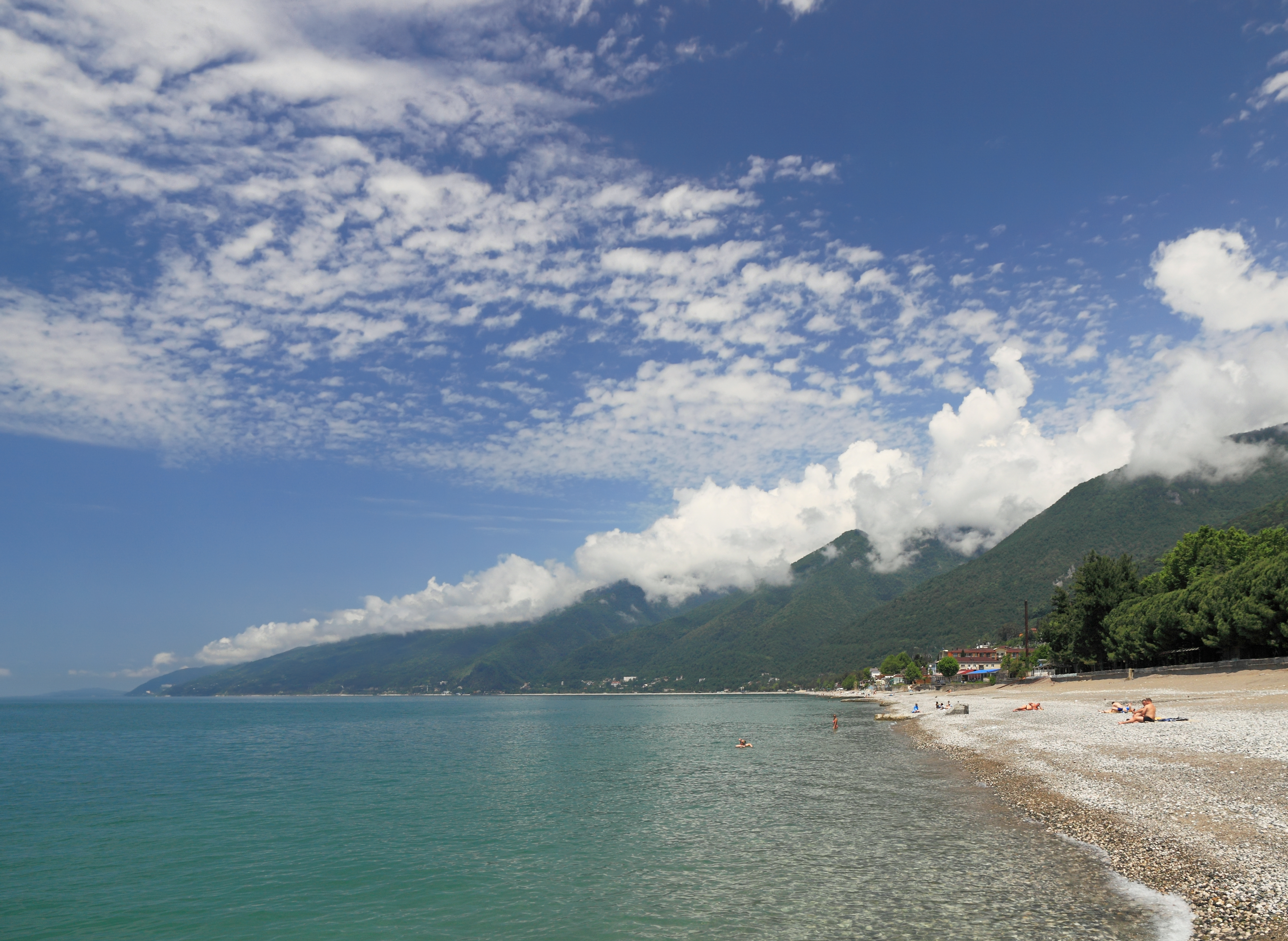
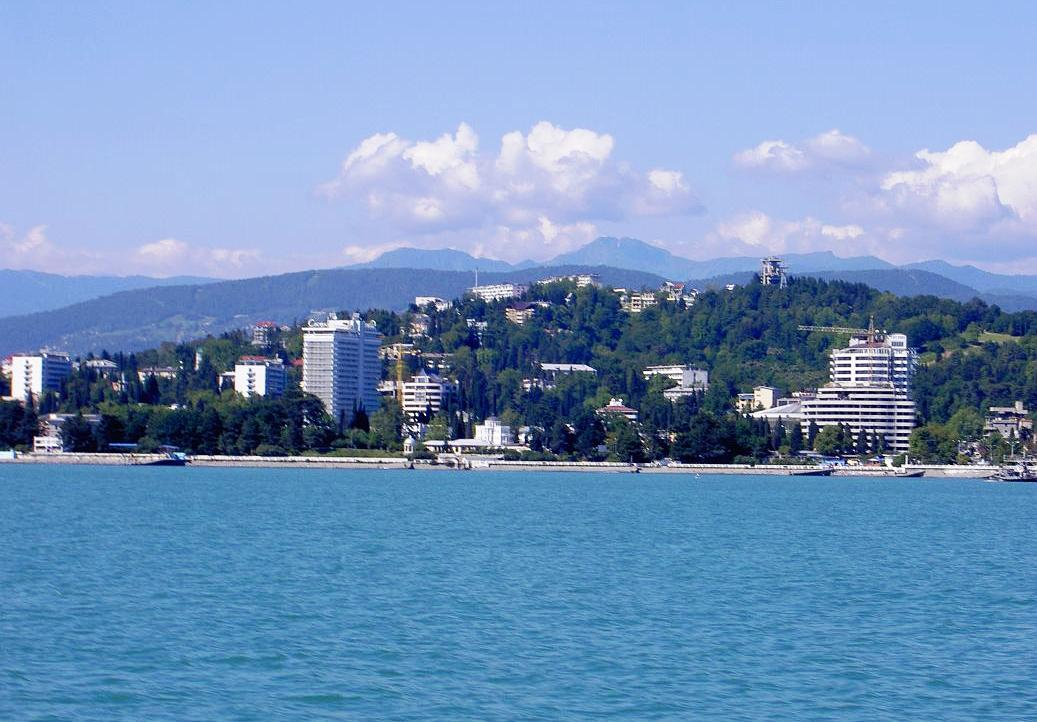
- Clockwise from top: a street view of Batumi; Port of Sochi; pebble beach of Gagra; and the view of Sochi and Caucasus Mountains behind

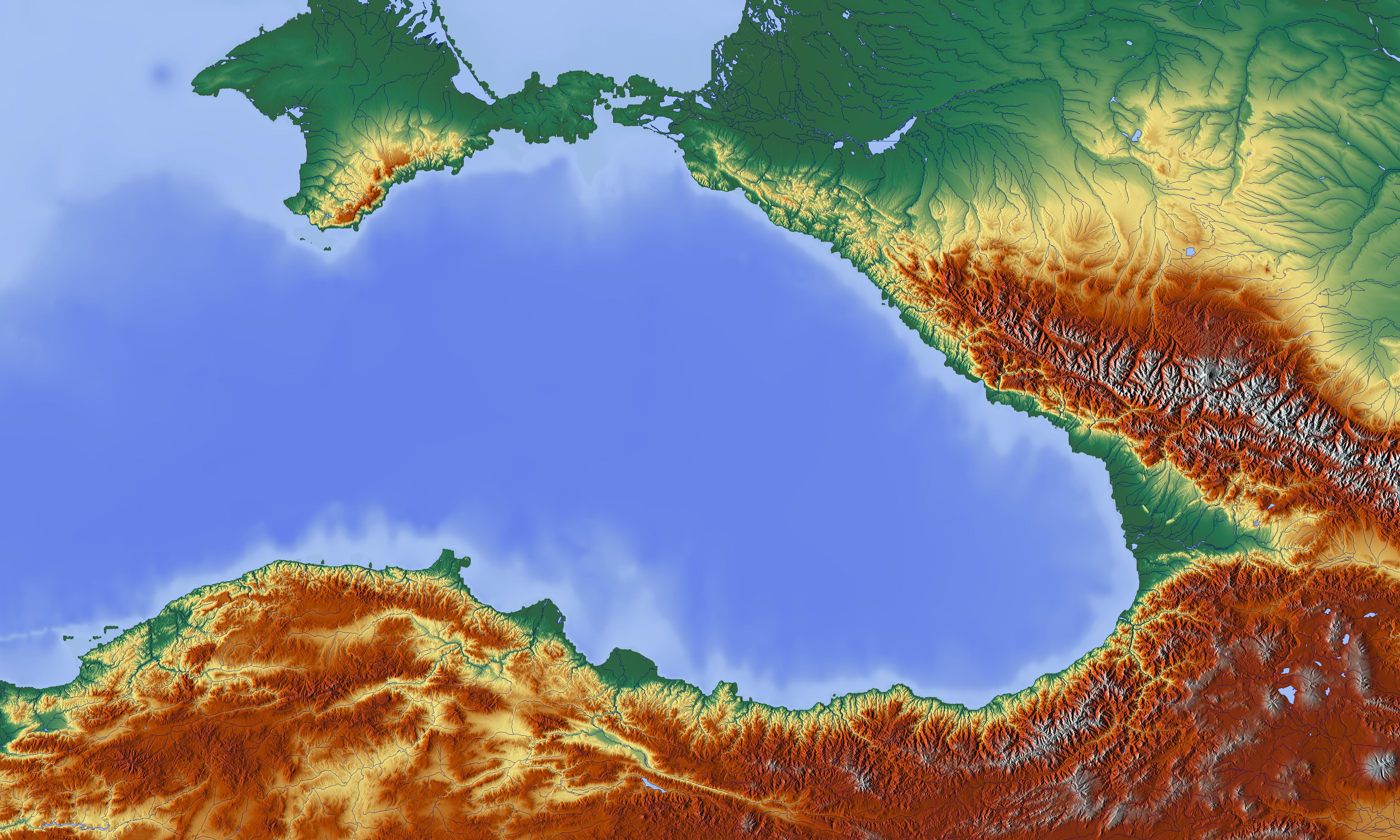
- Eastern part of Black sea
- Coordinates: 43°37′5.57″N 39°51′41.45″E
- Country: Russia; Georgia; Abkhazia

The Caucasian Riviera is a subtropical coastal zone along the eastern shores of the Black Sea under the Caucasus Mountains, with Krasnaya Polyana being the most known alpine ski resort. Riviera runs from Novorossiysk, Russia to Sarpi, Georgia. The area is divided into five regions, of which four (Adjara, Guria, Samegrelo, and Abkhazia) are located in Georgia, and one (the Black Sea coast of Krasnodar Krai) is in Russia. The Caucasian Riviera is 600 km (370 mi) long, 350 km (220 mi) of which belongs to Russia and 250 km (160 mi) to Georgia.

The coast is located on the same latitude as the French Riviera, the Italian Riviera, New York City and the Korean Peninsula, the Caucasian Riviera combines Mediterranean-like warmth with dramatic mountainous backdrops.

== Geography ==
The Black Sea coast of the Caucasus (BSC or Caucasian Riviera) is located at the same geographical latitude (42°-45°N) as the Adriatic, French Cote d'Azur and Italian Riviera resorts and has a similar climate.

The northern border of the region is generally considered to be the Taman Peninsula, marking the transition from the Azov Sea to the Black Sea. The city of Anapa is often regarded as the starting point of the resort area. In some classifications, the Azov coast of the Caucasus, located immediately to the north, is also included within the broader definition of the region.

The southern border of the Black Sea coast of the Caucasus coincides with the state border of the former USSR (now Georgia) with Turkey. Its natural continuation on Turkish territory is the Anatolian coast and, further, the Rumelian coast. From the east, the region of the Black Sea coast of the Caucasus is limited by the spurs of the Greater and Lesser Caucasus and the Colchis Lowland located between them, from the west - by the Black Sea itself.

The Black Sea coastline extends for over 600 km, of which about 350 km is in the Russian part. The most significant cities in the region are (from north to south): Anapa, Novorossiysk, Gelendzhik, Tuapse, Lazarevskoye, Sochi, Gagra, Pitsunda, Gudauta, Sukhumi, Ochamchira, Poti, and Batumi. Other resorts include Kabardinka, Divnomorskoye, Arkhipo-Osipovka, Dzhubga, Lermontovo, Novomikhaylovsky, Abrau-Dyurso, Dagomys, Matsesta, Khosta, Loo, Adler, New Athos, Gulripshi, Anaklia, Ganmukhuri, Kobuleti, Makhinjauri, Gonio, Sarpi, Vardane, Tsikhisdziri, and Chakvi.

== History ==
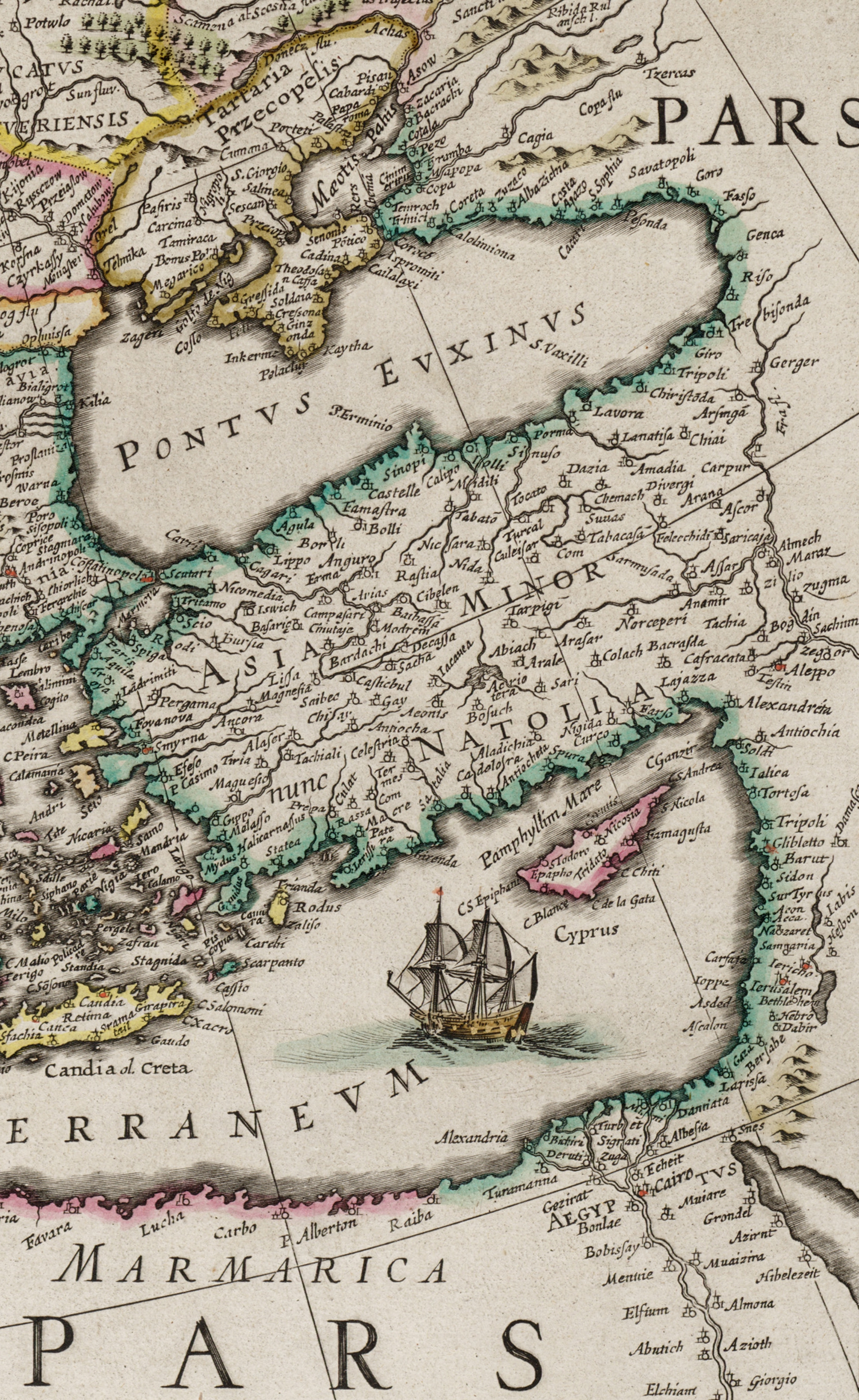
The historic map of the Black Sea

The Caucasian Riviera has been inhabited since ancient times, with evidence of human activity dating back to the Dolmen culture around 2,000–3,000 BCE. Unusual structures dolmens are found in large numbers on the Black Sea coast. The region was known as Colchis in Classical antiquity.

During the early antiquity, the Sarmatians and, apparently, the Scythians came here from the north, the ancient Greeks traded with them on their ships, although despite their constant presence they did not establish numerous settlements here. The coast was to some extent affected by ancient Greek colonization, and then by the indirect influence of the Roman Empire during its period of greatest power.

Various Adyghe tribes (Shapsugs, Natukhais, etc.), now few in number due to the bloody Russo-Caucasian War, during which about 5% of the Adyghe remained on their native land, are the autochthonous population of this region. The Christian influence of Byzantium in the early feudal period was replaced by the control of the Muslim Ottoman Empire after the 15th century, which spread Islam among the local population. The Treaty of Adrianople in 1829, concluded between the defeated Ottoman Empire and the victorious Russian Empire, legalized the transfer of the BSC to the latter, although the Russian army captured Anapa three times during various Russo-Turkish wars in 1791, 1808, and 1828. After the 1830s, the region began to be populated by Slavic settlers (Russians, Ukrainians), although the first Slavic state (the Tmutarakan Principality) was formed in the northern part of the BSC back in 944-965 and existed until the beginning of the 12th century.

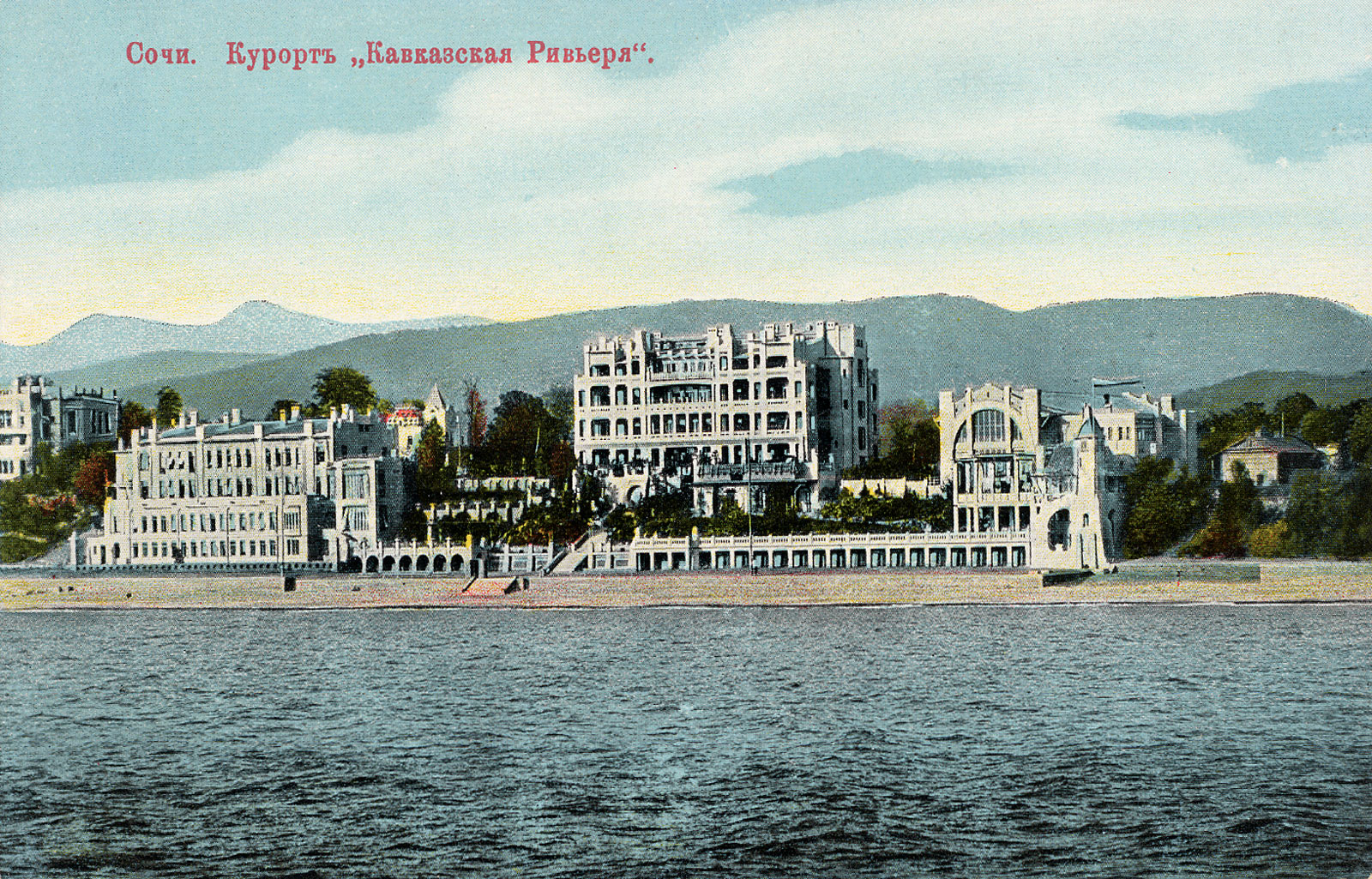
The "Caucaisian Riviera" resort in Sochi, ca. 1909

=== Pre-Soviet period ===
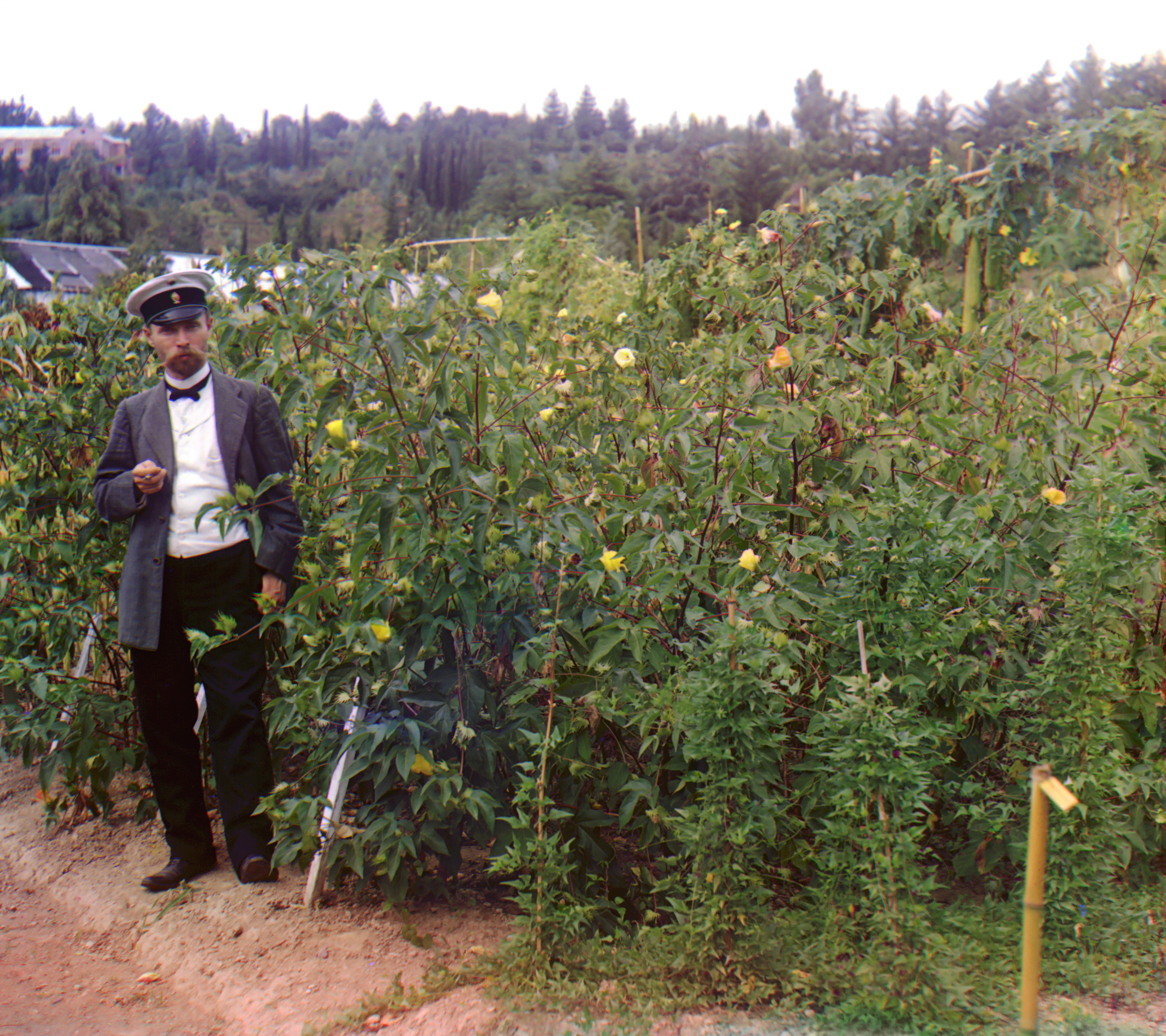
Sukhumi botanical garden, cotton plantation (between 1905 and 1915)

The Black Sea coast of the Caucasus became part of Russia as a result of the voluntary incorporation of the principalities of Abkhazia, Megrelia and Guria into the Russian Empire, as well as the conquest of Circassia during the Caucasian War of 1763-1864 and Adjara during the Russo-Turkish War of 1877-1878. Russia took over much of the Caucasus region after the Russo-Turkish War, and the Russians began displacing or killing much of the local Circassian population.

In 1867, the Black Sea District of the Kuban Region with its center in Novorossiysk was established, which was transformed into the Black Sea Governorate in 1896. In 1866, the Sukhumi Military Department was created as part of the Kutaisi Governorate, which was separated into an independent district in 1903, and in 1878, from the territories ceded from Turkey according to the Berlin Treaty of that year, the Batumi Region (in 1883-1903 - the district of the Kutaisi Governorate). The Sukhumi Military Road and the North Caucasian Highway were of great economic and military importance for the BSC region.

After the February and October Revolutions in 1917–1920, parts of the region's territory were part of unstable state entities - both Soviet and monarchist and nationalist. These were: the Kuban Soviet Republic, the Black Sea Soviet Republic, the Kuban-Black Sea Soviet Republic, the North Caucasian Soviet Republic, the Great Don Army, the Kuban People's Republic, the South of Russia, the Transcaucasian Democratic Federative Republic, and the Georgian Democratic Republic. BSC was partially occupied by British and Turkish troops.

=== Soviet period ===
From 1920 to 1921, Soviet power was firmly established on the Black Sea coast of the Caucasus, and the Treaty of Moscow of 1921 established the state border with the Kemalist Turkish Republic in Adjara, which defined the southern border of the BSC, and which still exists today.

Russian developers in the early 20th century saw the area as a "Caucasian Riviera" and began building hotels and spas. Like the southern coast of Crimea, the Black Sea coast of the Caucasus began to be actively used for resort purposes only at the end of the 19th century. This was caused by the poor suitability of the region not only for recreation, but also for the permanent residence of a significant number of people: with the exception of small coastal areas, the coastal zone was a chain of malarial swamps interspersed with mountain gorges and villages. The coast was very densely populated in the territory of residence of the Circassians, Ubykhs and Abazins, where the mountain gorges began at the coastline. At the same time, in order to avoid malaria, the highlanders settled on the hills and ridges of the mountains.

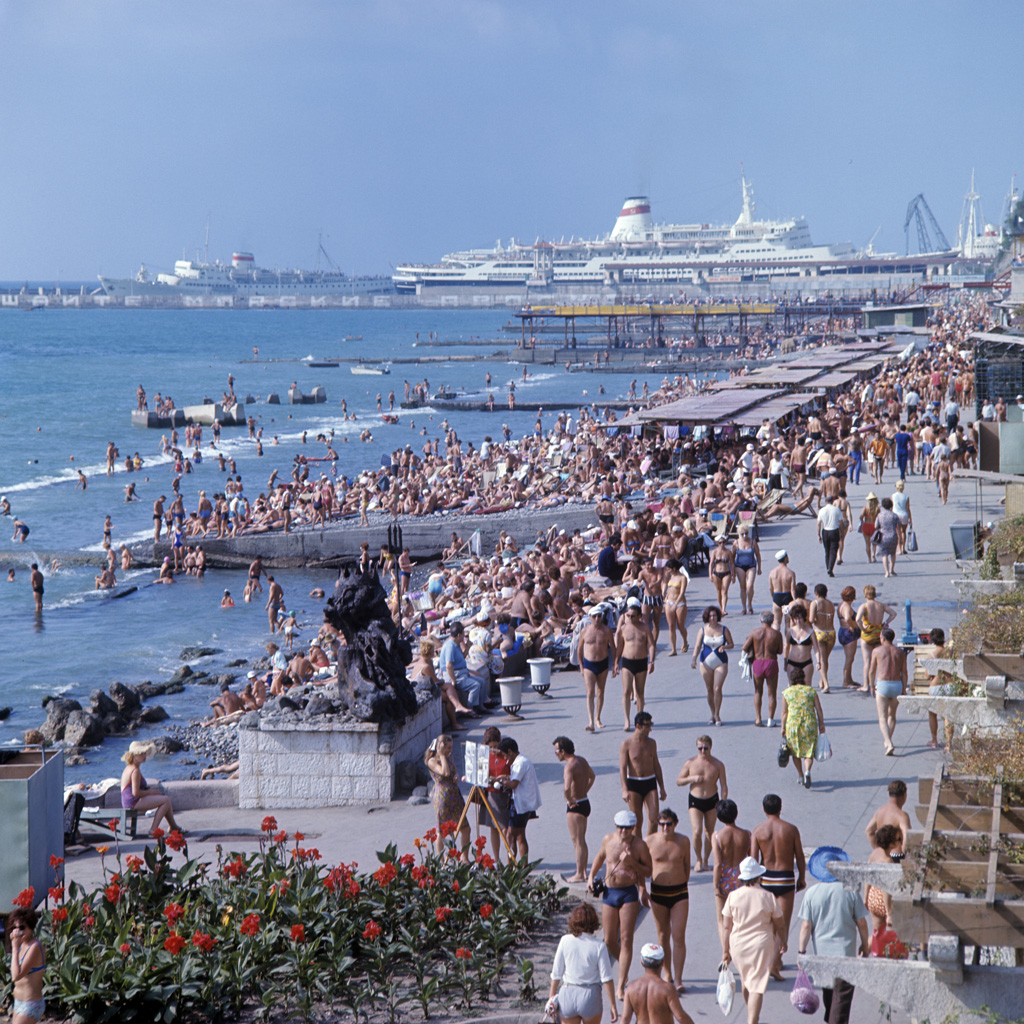
Sochi coast, 1973

By the early to mid-20th century, especially during the Soviet era, most of the Black Sea coast of the Caucasus was subjected to large-scale terraforming, with the drainage of swampy areas and the elimination of mosquitoes as carriers of malaria – using chemical treatment, planting special types of "anti-mosquito" flora (mainly eucalyptus) and the introduction of the Mosquitofish, which actively feeds on mosquito larvae.

The Great Patriotic War, namely the Battle of the Caucasus, also affected the northern part of the BSC. During the offensive of the Nazi troops of Army Group A with the support of the Romanian-Italian naval forces from the sea in August–September 1942, fierce battles continued in the Maykop-Tuapse and Krasnodar-Novorossiysk directions. By August 31, the troops of the 17th Army of the Reich captured Anapa, and by September 7, they reached the northern outskirts of Novorossiysk (Novorossiysk Operation (1942)). Despite numerous attempts, the enemy failed to break through to Tuapse and Sukhumi (Tuapse Operation (1942)). A partisan movement developed in the temporarily occupied territory, and in the autumn of the following year, 1943, during the Novorossiysk-Taman operation from September 9 to October 9, the troops of the North Caucasus Front, in cooperation with the Black Sea Fleet, liberated Novorossiysk and the entire Taman Peninsula. The Battle of the Caucasus was won by the USSR. Thousands of Soviet soldiers were awarded the medal "For the Defense of the Caucasus" as a result of the operation, established by the Decree of the Presidium of the Supreme Soviet of the USSR on May 1, 1944.

The industry remained underdeveloped until the 1930s, when Sochi became main Russia's tourist destination. In the post-war years, the Black Sea coast of the Caucasus became the most important "all-Union health resort". In 1970, by a decree of the Council of Ministers of the USSR, it was classified as a resort of Union significance. In the 1980s, up to 25 million citizens of the Soviet Union vacationed there each year.

=== After year 1991 ===
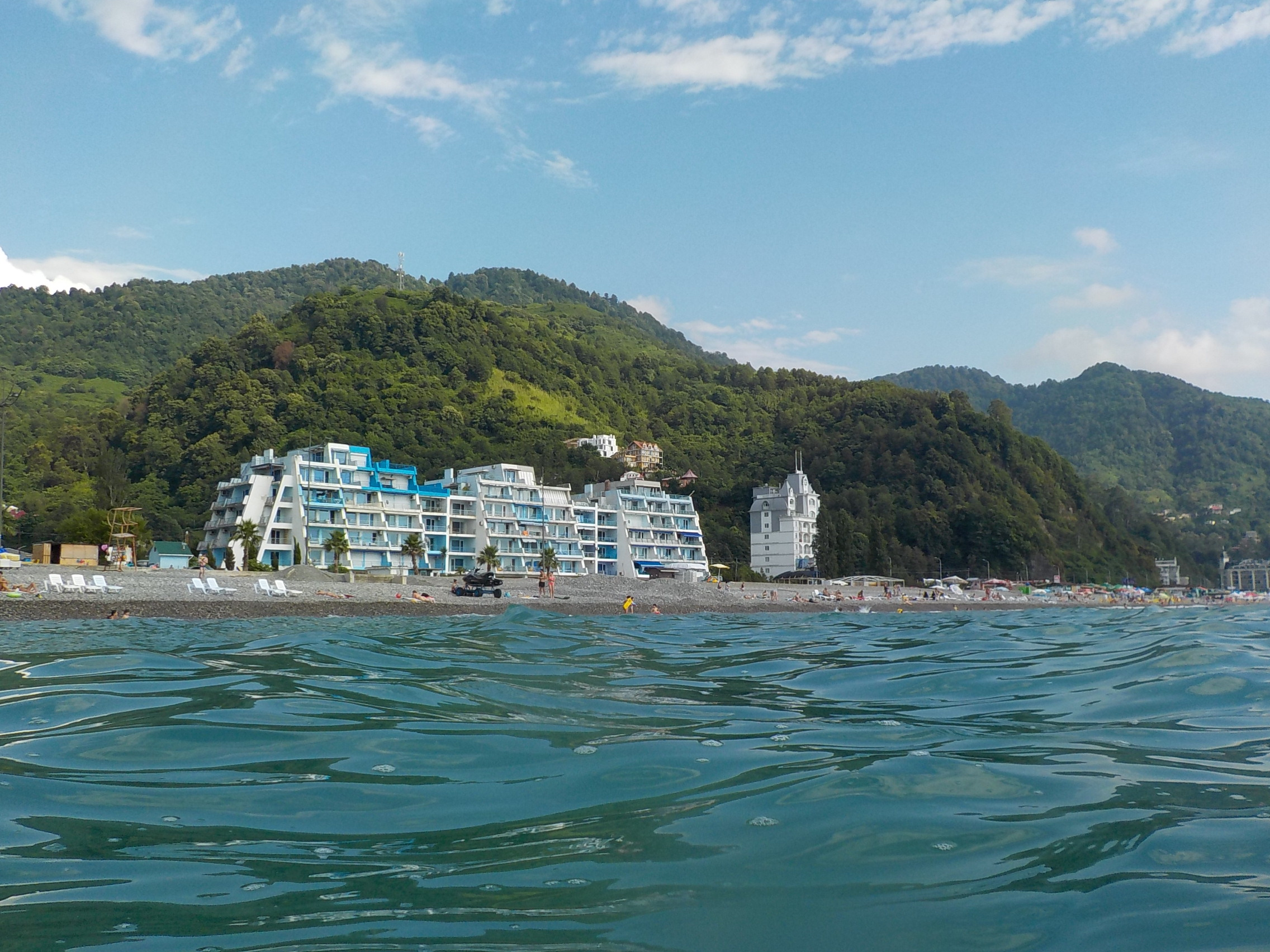
Black Sea coast near Gonio, Georgia

The Black Sea coast of the Caucasus suffered significant damage with the collapse of the USSR in 1991, regional and economic instability crippled tourism and the Caucasian Riviera has lost its popularity, when political conflicts on the territory of the former Georgian SSR entered the phase of open armed confrontation, in particular the 1992-1993 war in Abkhazia and the 1991-1993 civil war in Georgia. Destroyed cities and infrastructure, a large number of minefields, small arms in hand, crime, economic, energy and transport blockade, ethnopolitical disunity, human losses, tens of thousands of refugees - all these consequences still affect the development of the region. Transport links were partially restored only in the second half of the 2000s.

The Adjara crisis of 2004 and the Russian-Georgian war broke out in 2008, as a result of which Russia recognized Abkhazia, but is accused by Georgia, the United States, Ukraine and the OSCE of occupying the region, did not add economic benefits to the region. Recovery began in the 2000s, spurred on by the Georgian renovation of Batumi, which modernised the capital of Adjara. And Russia's 2014 Winter Olympics in Sochi, which spurred massive infrastructure investment, some $12 billion of which was Russian money.

== Climate ==
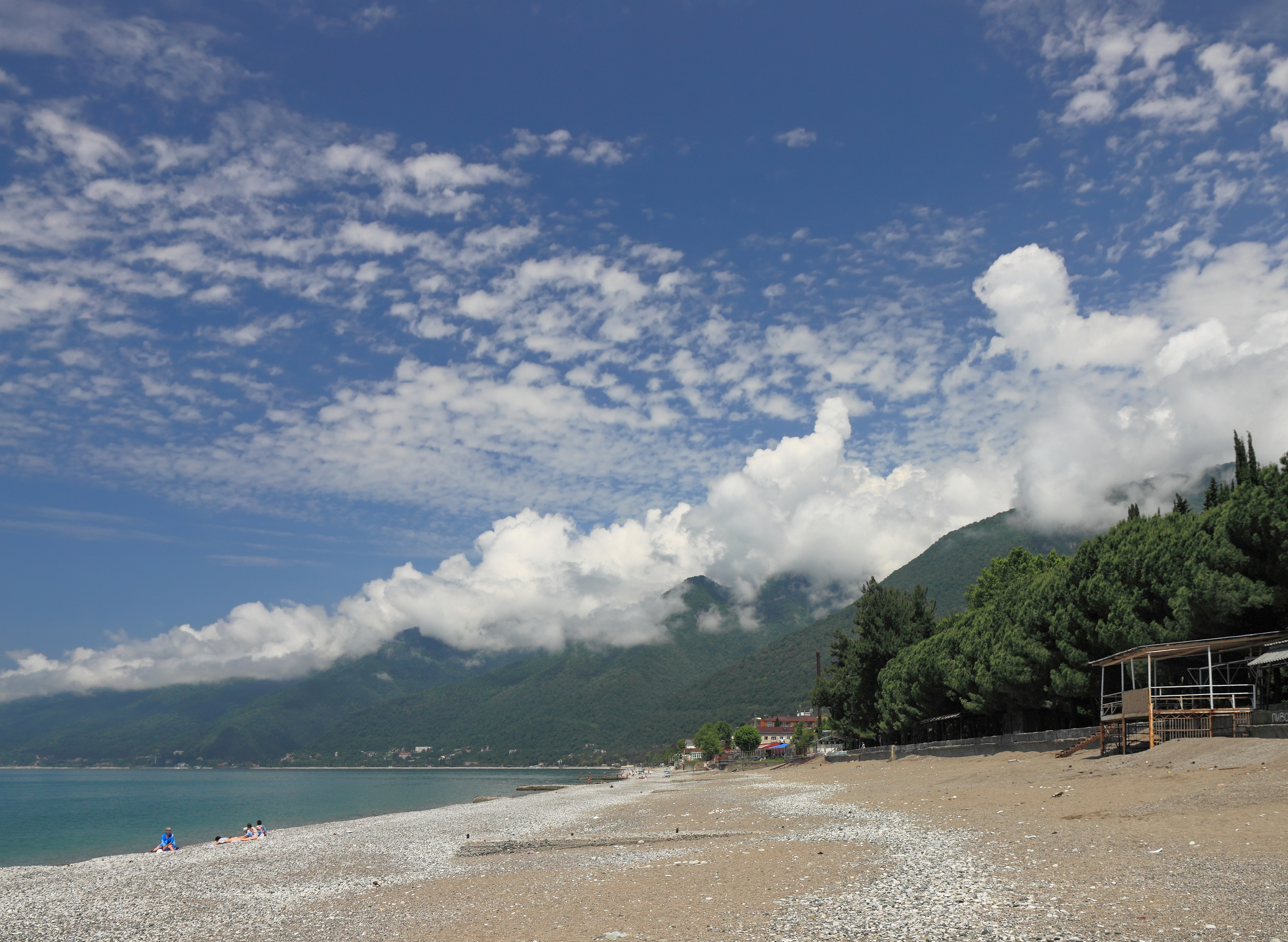
Gagra, Abkhazia

The Riviera's climate shifts from temperate to subtropical. From Novorossiysk to Tuapse, the average temperature in January is 3 °C (37 °F), and during July it's 23 °C (73 °F). To the south of Tuapse the climate is humid subtropical because of the mountains rising more than 1000 meters above sea level. The mountains don't let the humidity of the Black Sea move east which creates a microclimate with an average temperature of 5 °C (41 °F) in January, and 28 °C (82 °F) in July. North of Tuapse, the average rainfall is 500 mm (20 in) a year. South of Tuapse down to Adjara it is 2,800 mm (110 in), most of which falls during winter. Average sunshine is between 2200 and 2400 hours and only an average of 12 days during summer are rainy.

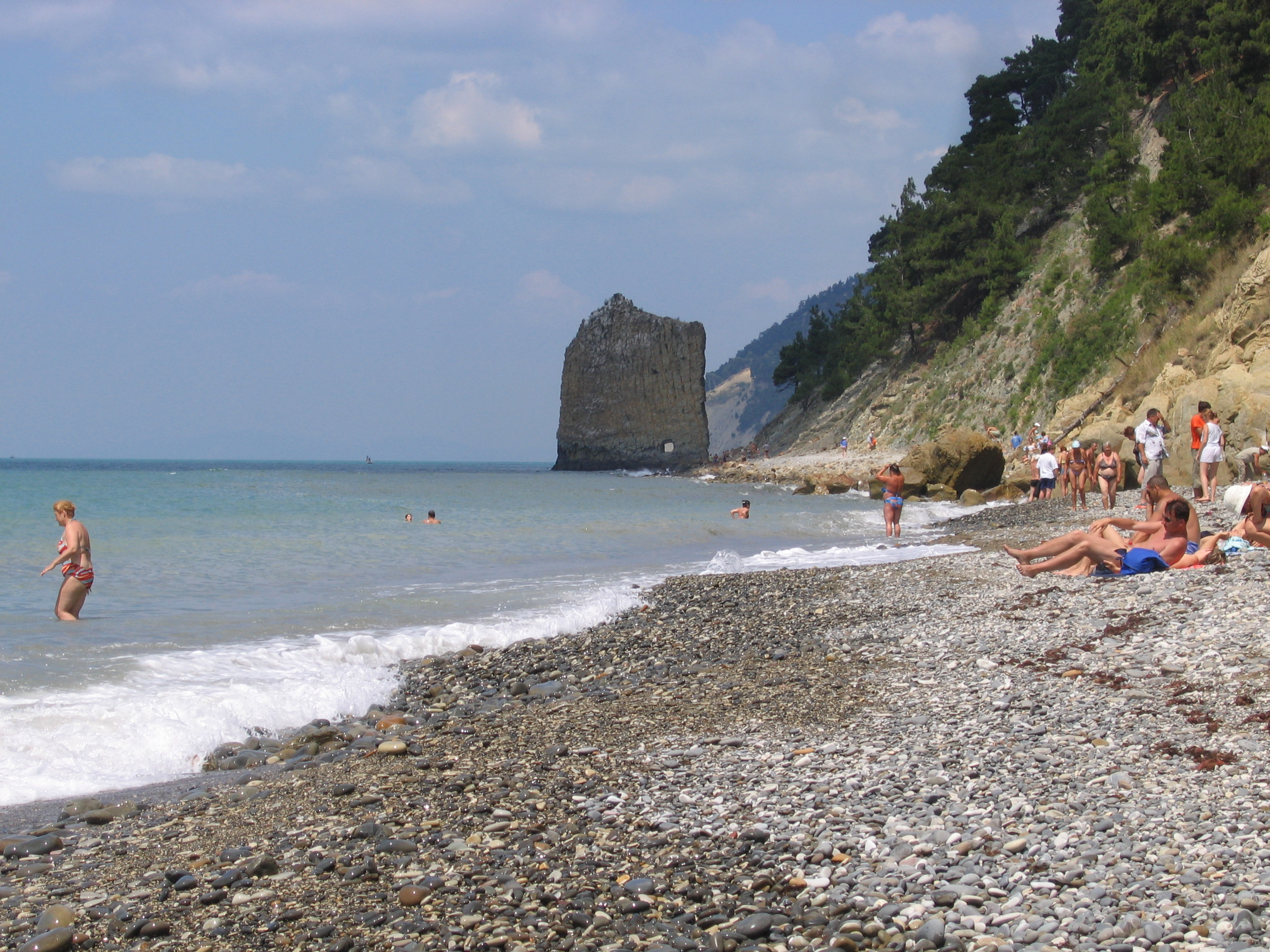
Pebble beach near Gelendzhik. In the background - Sail rock

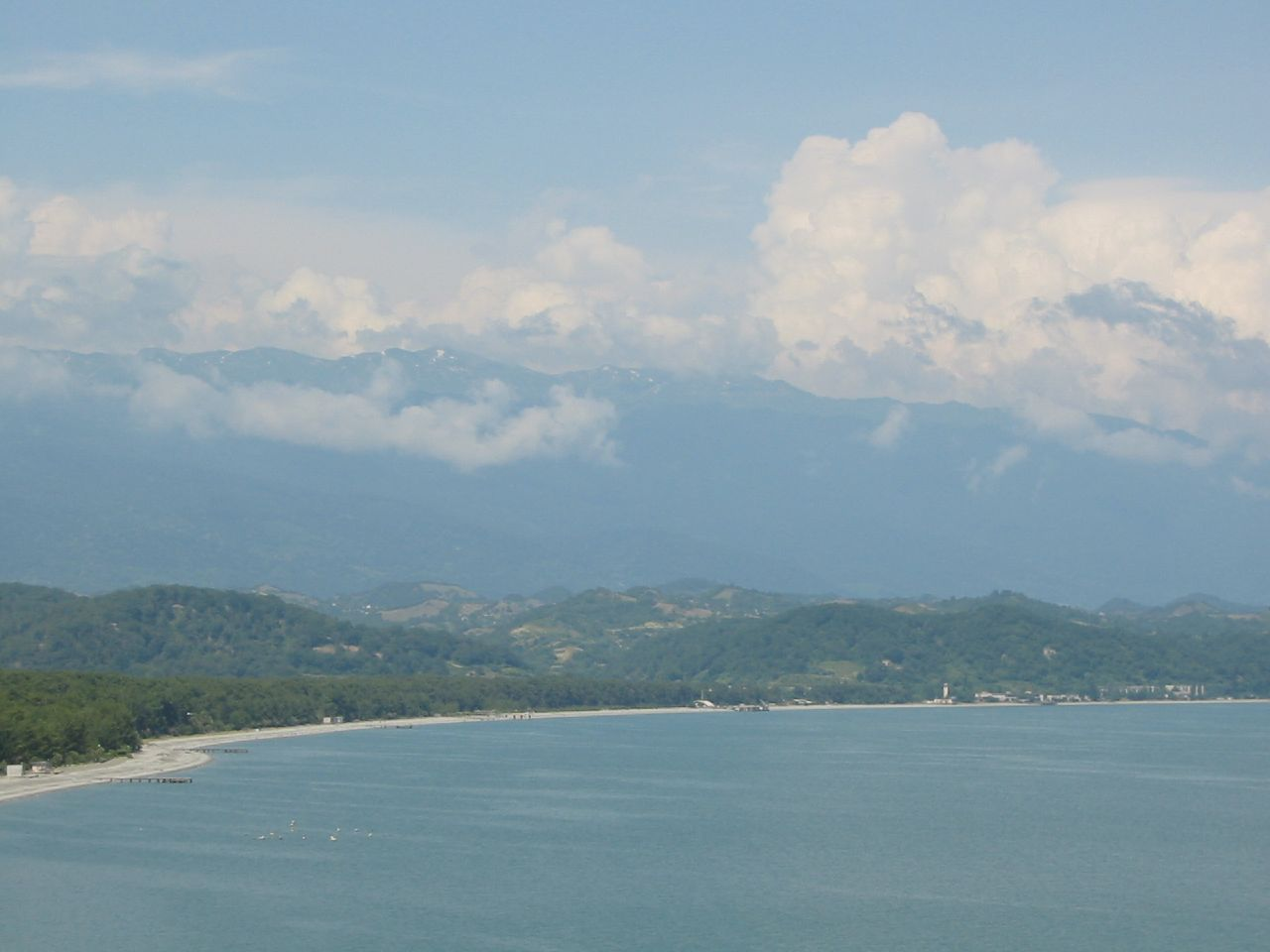
View on Bichvinta, Georgia

== Nature ==
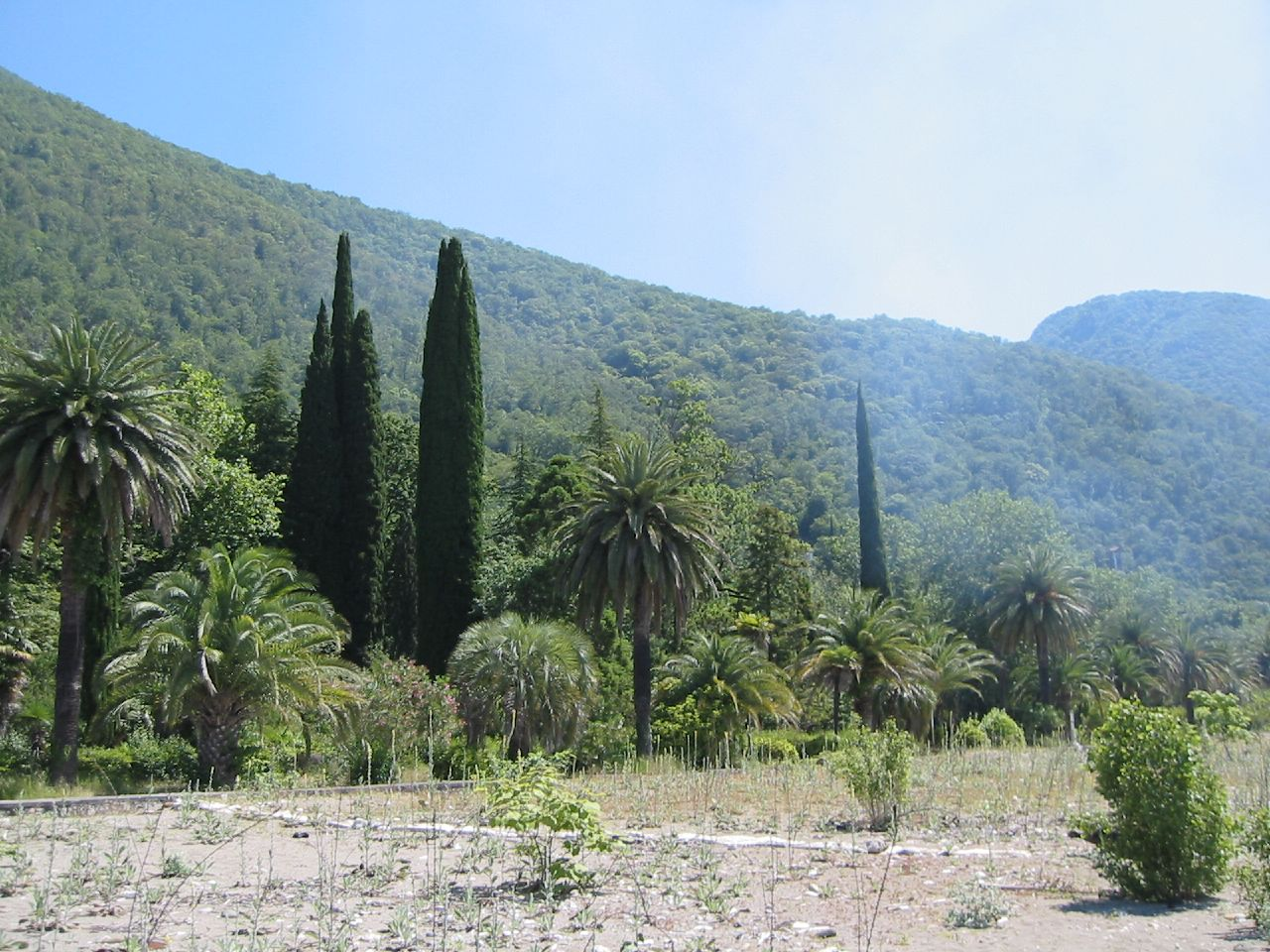
Gagra subtropical landscape

The mountain slopes are covered with rich woody vegetation - beech, hornbeam, chestnut, yew, fir and other conifers. On the coast south of Gelendzhik subtropical species of plants, in particular palms, yuccas, acacias, magnolias, boxwoods, prevail. Broad-leaved forests with lianas and evergreen shrubs are widespread in the south of the region. About six thousand plant species grow in the Black Sea coastal region, among which more than a hundred are found only in the Black Sea coast and a considerable number of relict plants, e.g. common laurel, Pontic rhododendron, Ilex colchica, Pistacia, Peperomia obtusifolia, Juniperus excelsa, Pinus brutia var. pityusa, and others. The Anapa coast has the largest number of plant species in the region.

The Anapa coast has the most extensive (up to 35 km long) and high quality sandy beaches of the entire resort area of the Black Sea coast of the Caucasus. Sandy beaches are also characteristic of the area from the Kodor River to the Kintrish River. In the Pitsunda-Novy Afon section, the beaches change to gravel-sand beaches. Pebble and boulder-pebble beaches prevail on the rest of the coast, the area of which is sometimes limited by the mountains approaching the sea. There is a problem of beaches being washed out by the sea.

The Caucasus Biosphere Reserve, which is on the UNESCO World Heritage List, is north of Sochi.

=== Fauna ===
- Endemic species: West Caucasian tur (Severtsov's tur), Long-clawed mole vole, Caucasian snowcock (mountain turkey), Caucasian black grouse, Caucasian viper (Koznakov's snake), etc.
- Acclimatized species and invasive species: Altai squirrel and raccoon dog (released in 1937–1940), and later - North American raccoon, muskrat, nutria (1960s-1970s).
- In the mountains, there are Caucasian bear, lynx, wild boar, European wildcat, Caucasian red deer, roe deer, bison, tur. Grass snakes, copperheads, and turtles live in the gorges. European minks, Caucasian otters, and dippers live in the rivers and streams. There are many waterfowl in the Kuban Delta and on the estuaries, seagulls are found everywhere. Trout is found in mountain rivers and streams. Dolphins live in the waters of the Black Sea.
- Butterflies: mourning cloak, admiral, swallowtail, tortoiseshell, night hawk moth, large praying mantis (up to 10 cm in length). In late May - early June, when the nights on the coast are already quite warm and humid, large fireflies appear on most of the Black Sea coast.

== Economy ==
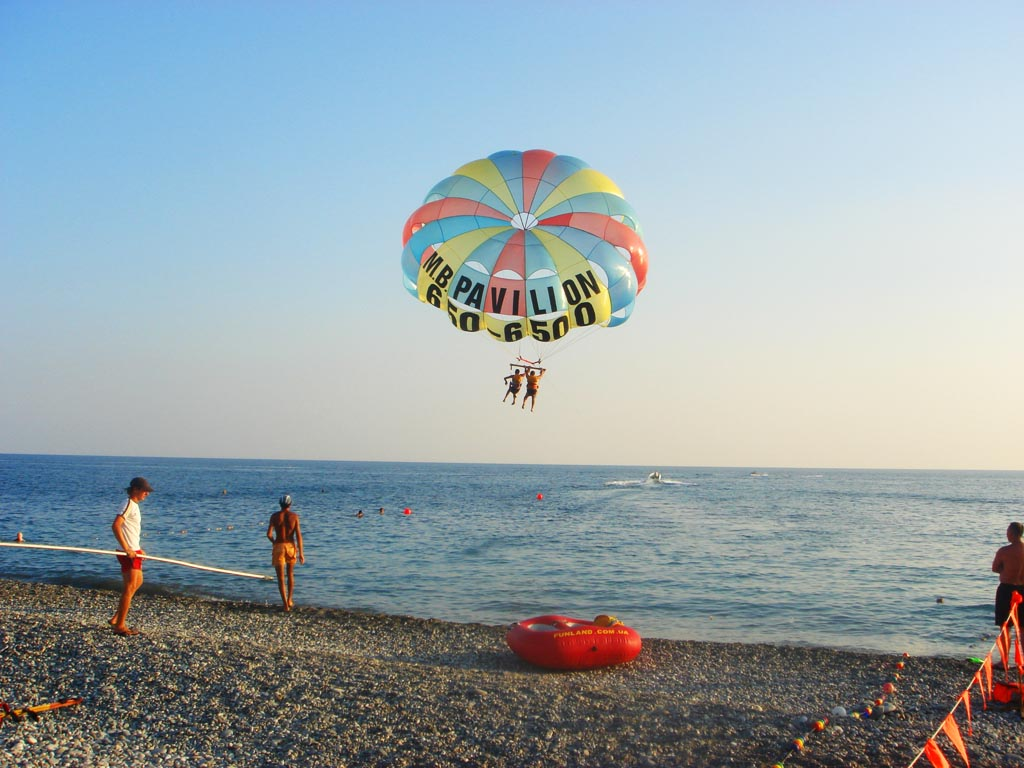
Pebble beach in Dagomys

The favorable climate and natural conditions of the coast are a significant factor in economic activity. The economy of the area is based on tourism, agriculture and transportation. Tourist season lasts from the middle of May to the middle of October. The major touristic centers are located in Adjara, Abkhazia and Sochi. There are three ski areas near the coast.

Agriculture is a significant part of the economy with a variety of vegetables, cereals and fruits grown in the area, winter wheat and corn, subtropical fruit growing is strong - cultivation of citrus fruits, pomegranate, persimmon, fig, viticulture. Tea growing is common in the region (the northernmost tea plantations in the world), and the Caucasus Mountains are one of the northernmost areas of the world where tea is grown. Among industrial crops, the main one is sunflower.

But the main sources of prosperity of the region are sea shipping and tourism, including international. The swimming season lasts over 120 days, from mid-May to mid-late October, the velvet season is long. However, the high development of the coast is characteristic only of resort cities - Greater Sochi, Anapa, Gelendzhik, Sukhum and individual resort villages.

Over the long period of the sanatorium and resort business, over 14 thousand institutions for medical and health recreation have been created. Today, on the Russian Black Sea coast alone, there are over 1,000 boarding houses, sanatoriums and hotels. In recent years, 7% of Russian residents vacation on the Black Sea coast of the Caucasus every year.

The Black Sea is also called the "dead sea" because there is no life below 200 meters. However, several species of fish can still be caught in the sea, so fishing forms a part of the region's economy.

Some of the area's important ports are Batumi Seaport, Poti Sea Port, Sukhumi, Sochi, Tuapse and Port of Novorossiysk.

== Gallery ==
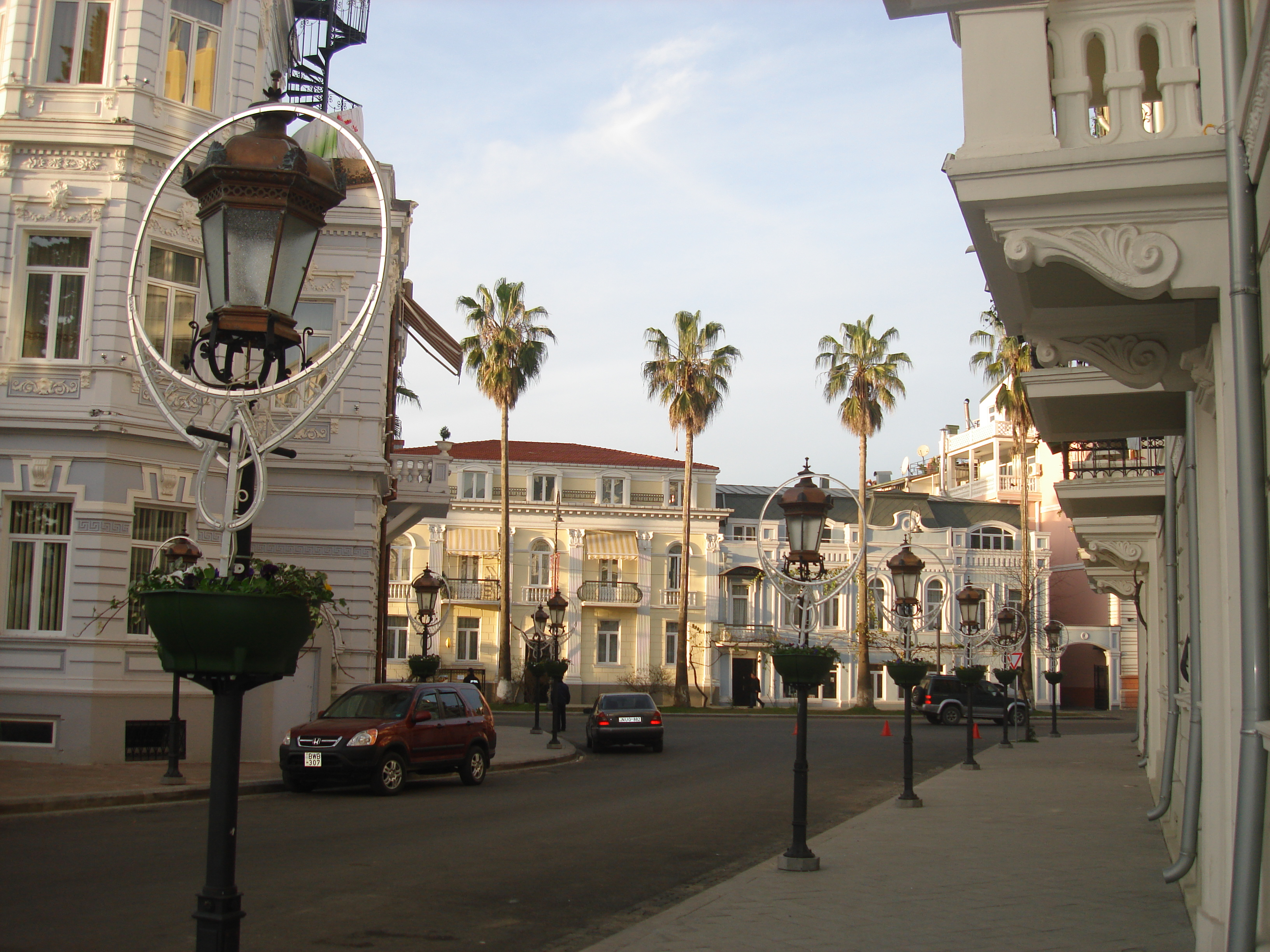
Streets of Batumi

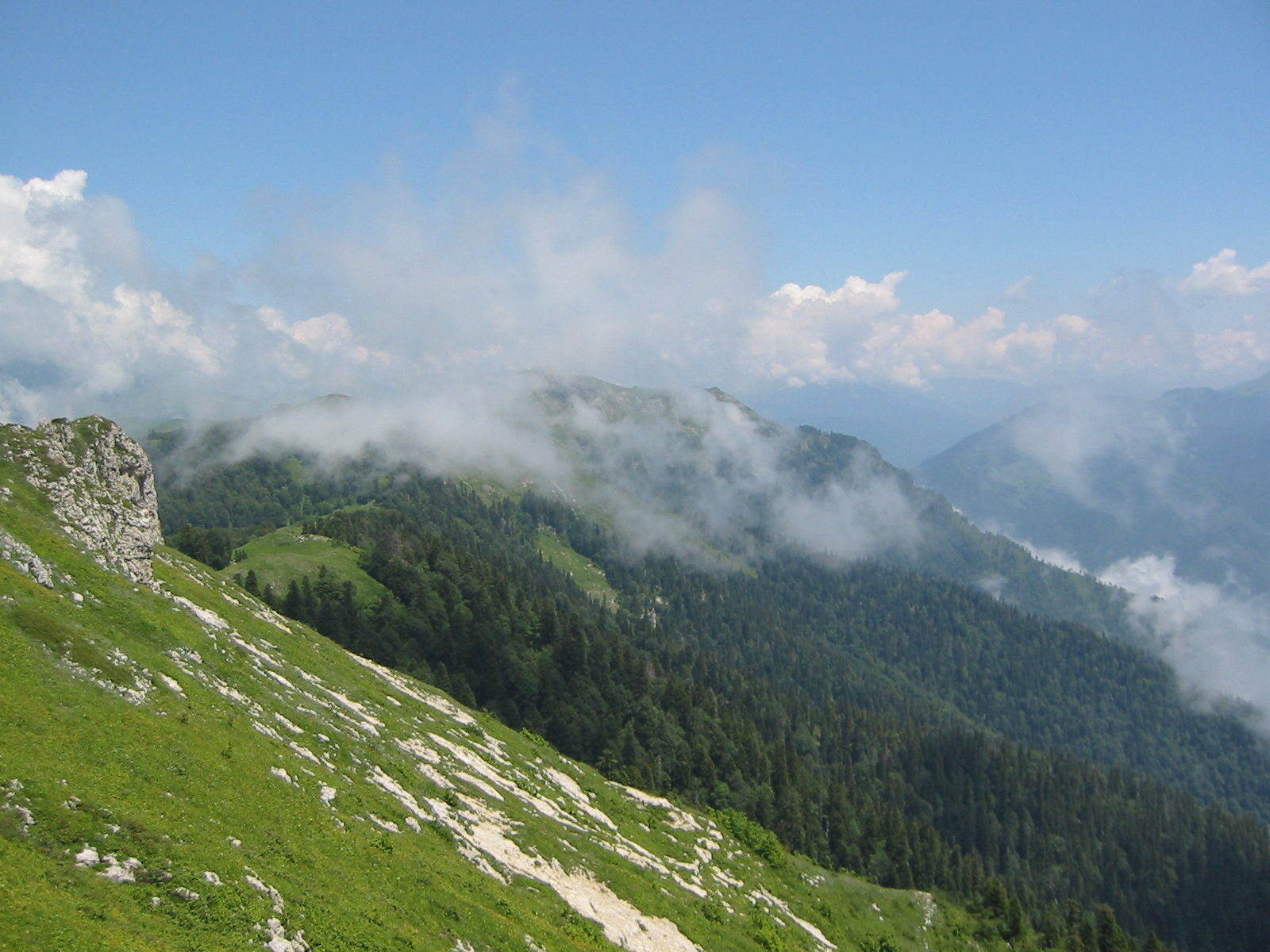
Gagra Mountains, Abkhazia

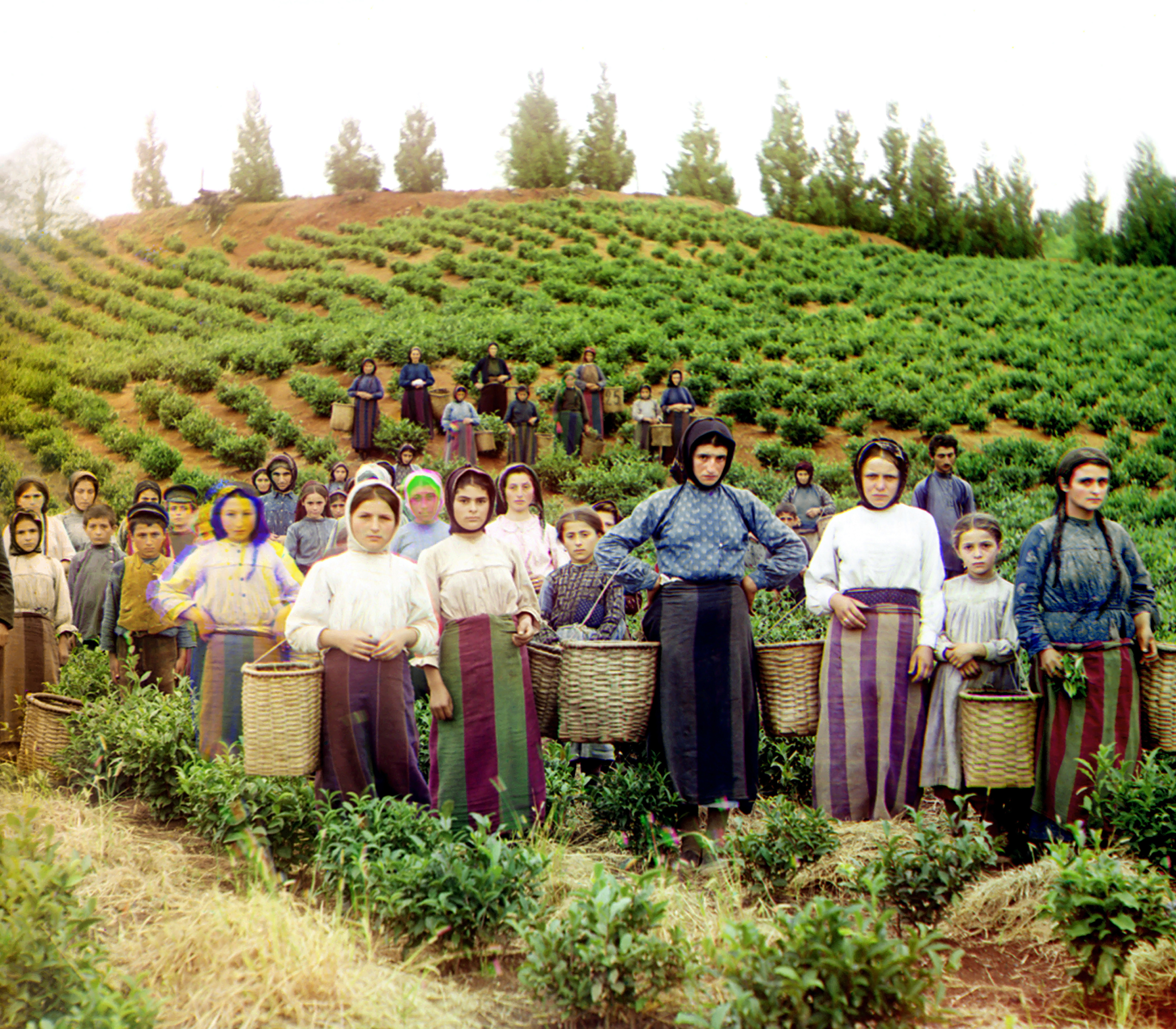
Tea harvest workers, near Batumi, ca. 1909-1915

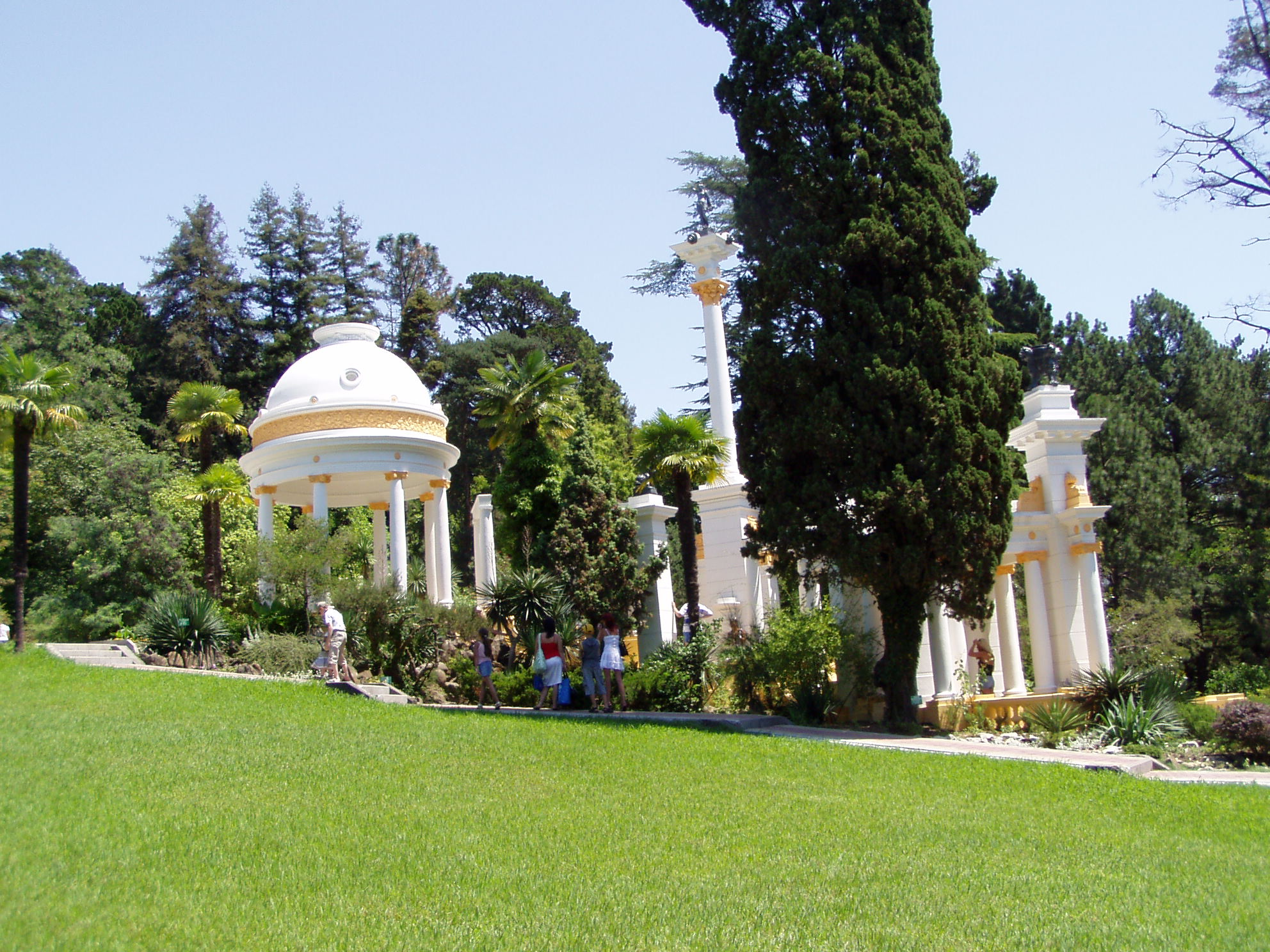
Sochi Dendrarium

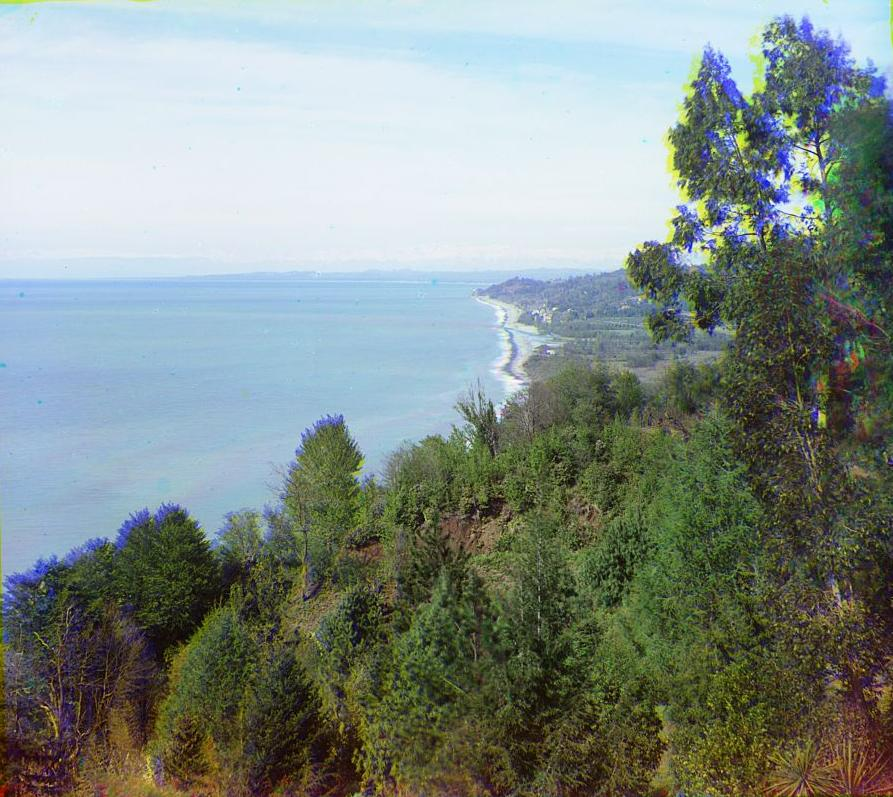
View of the coast from Cape Zelenyi (Batumi)

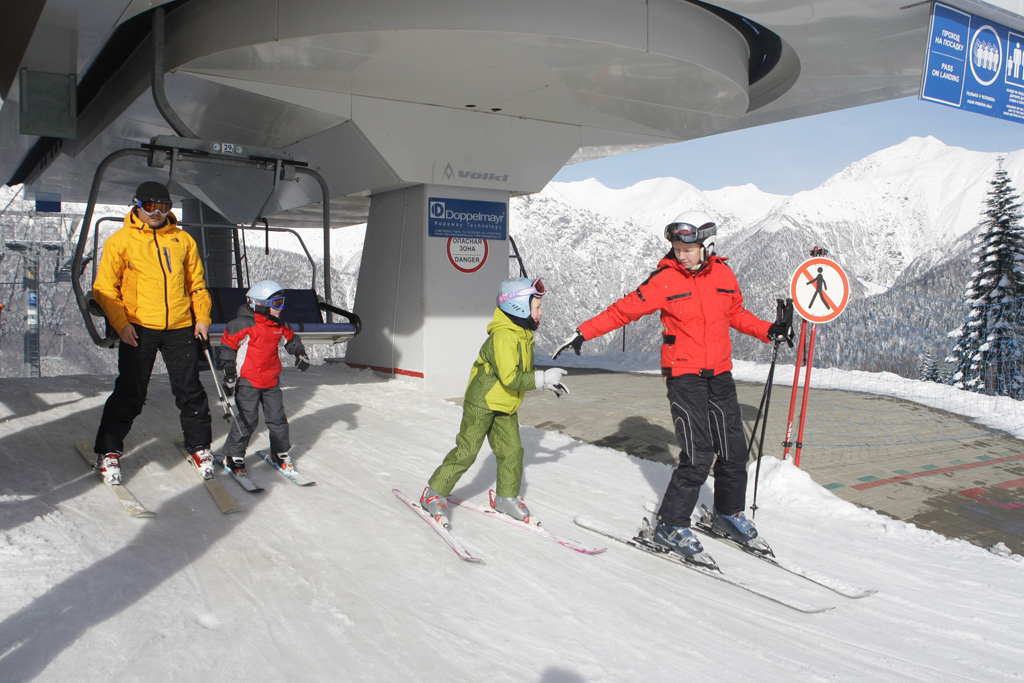
Alp Ski in Krasnaya Polyana, January 2011

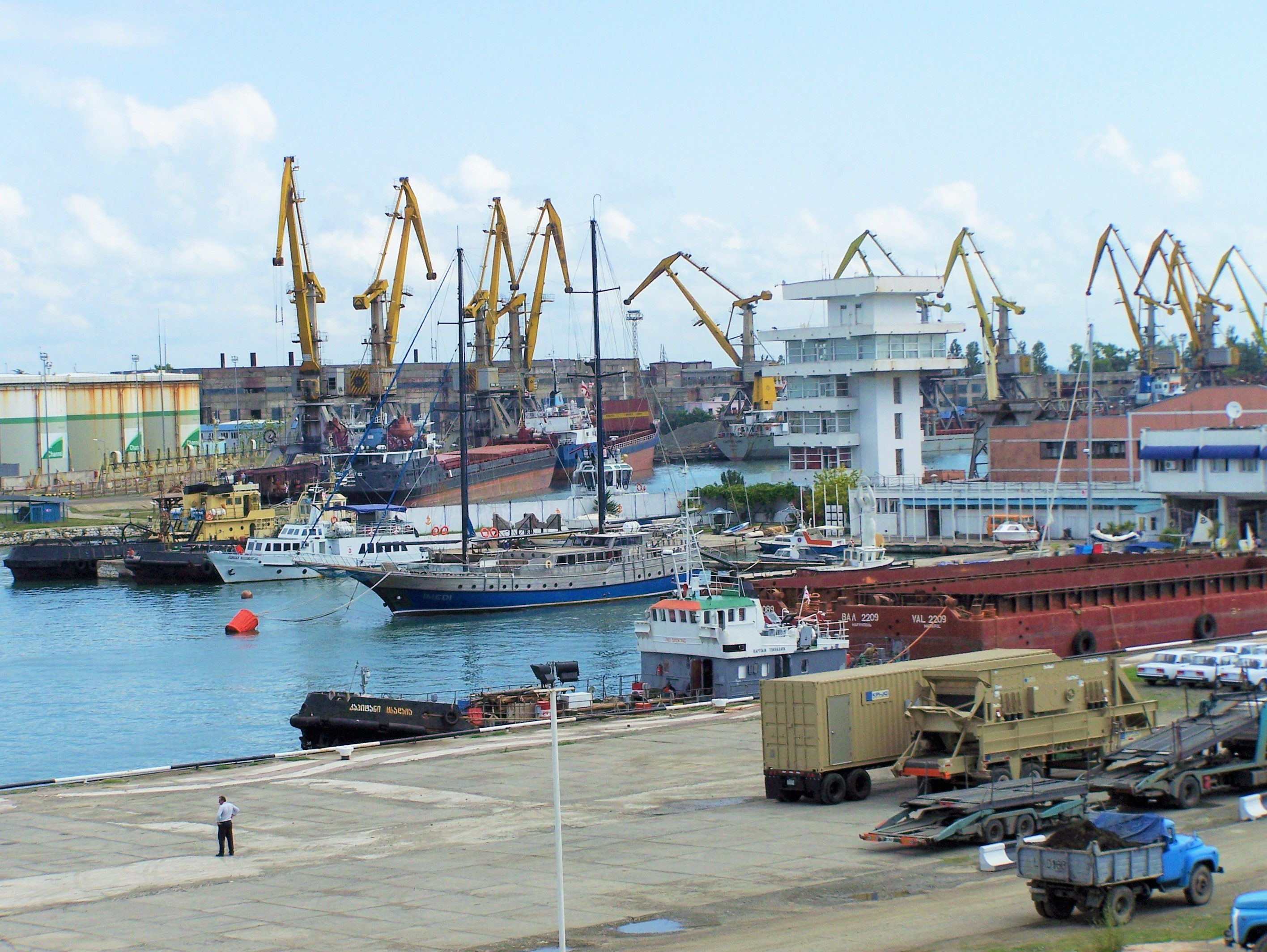
Poti Port

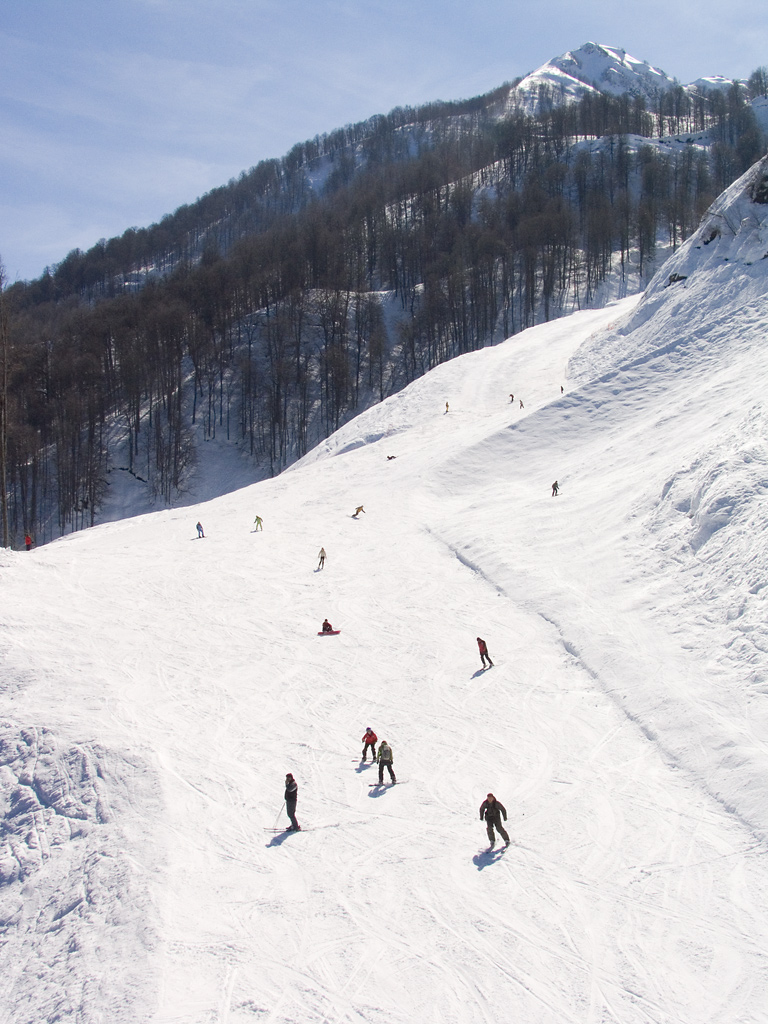
Krasnaya Polyana

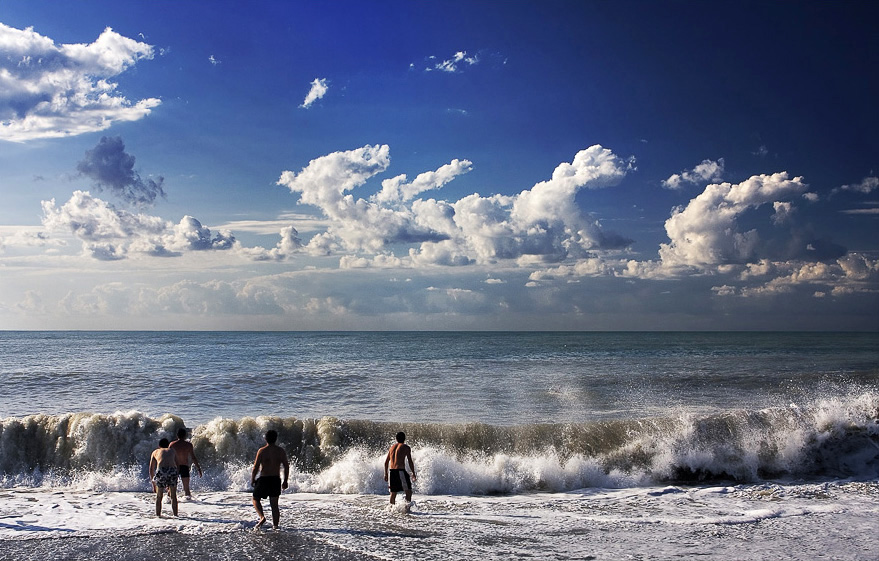
Batumi beach

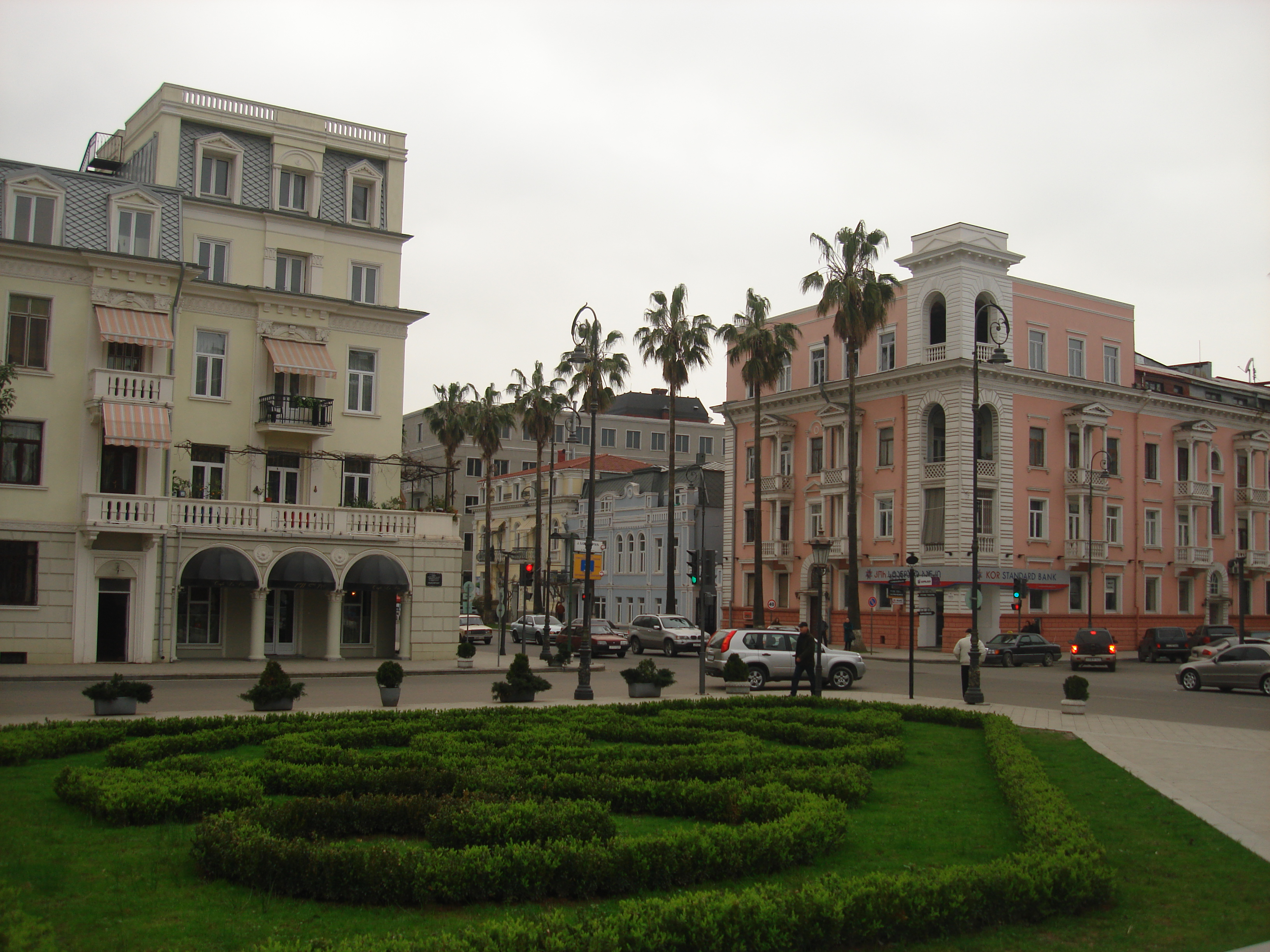
Batumi Neptune Square

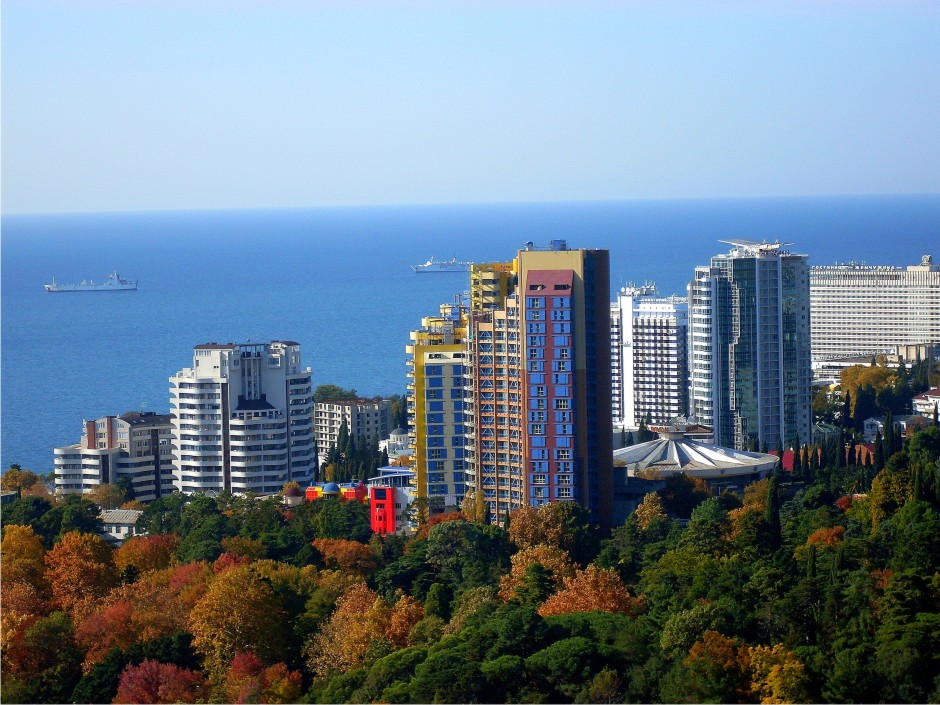
Apartment buildings in Sochi

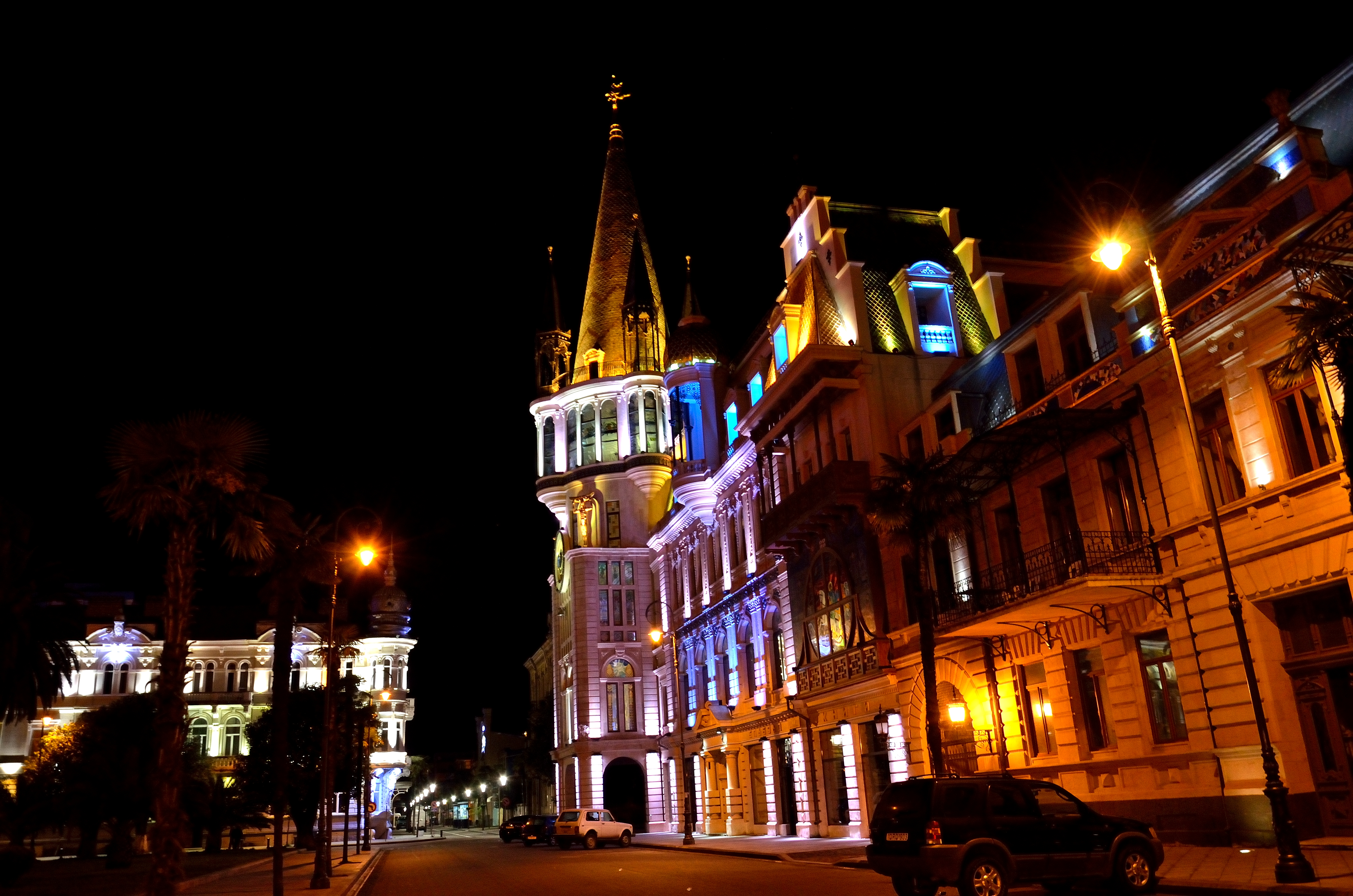
Batumi at night

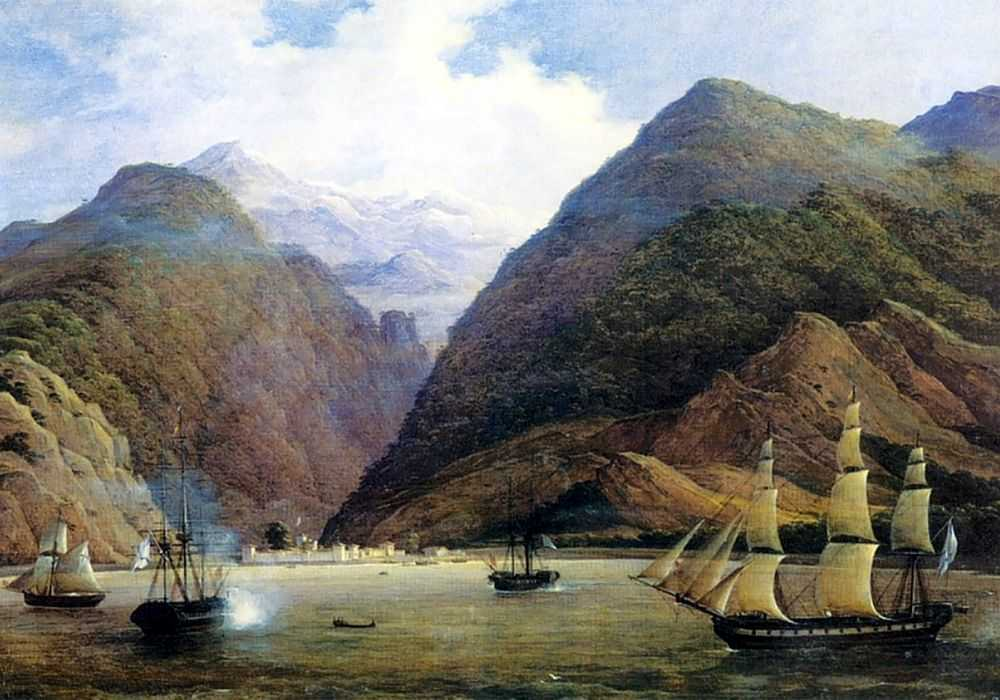
Gagra Castle (XIX century)

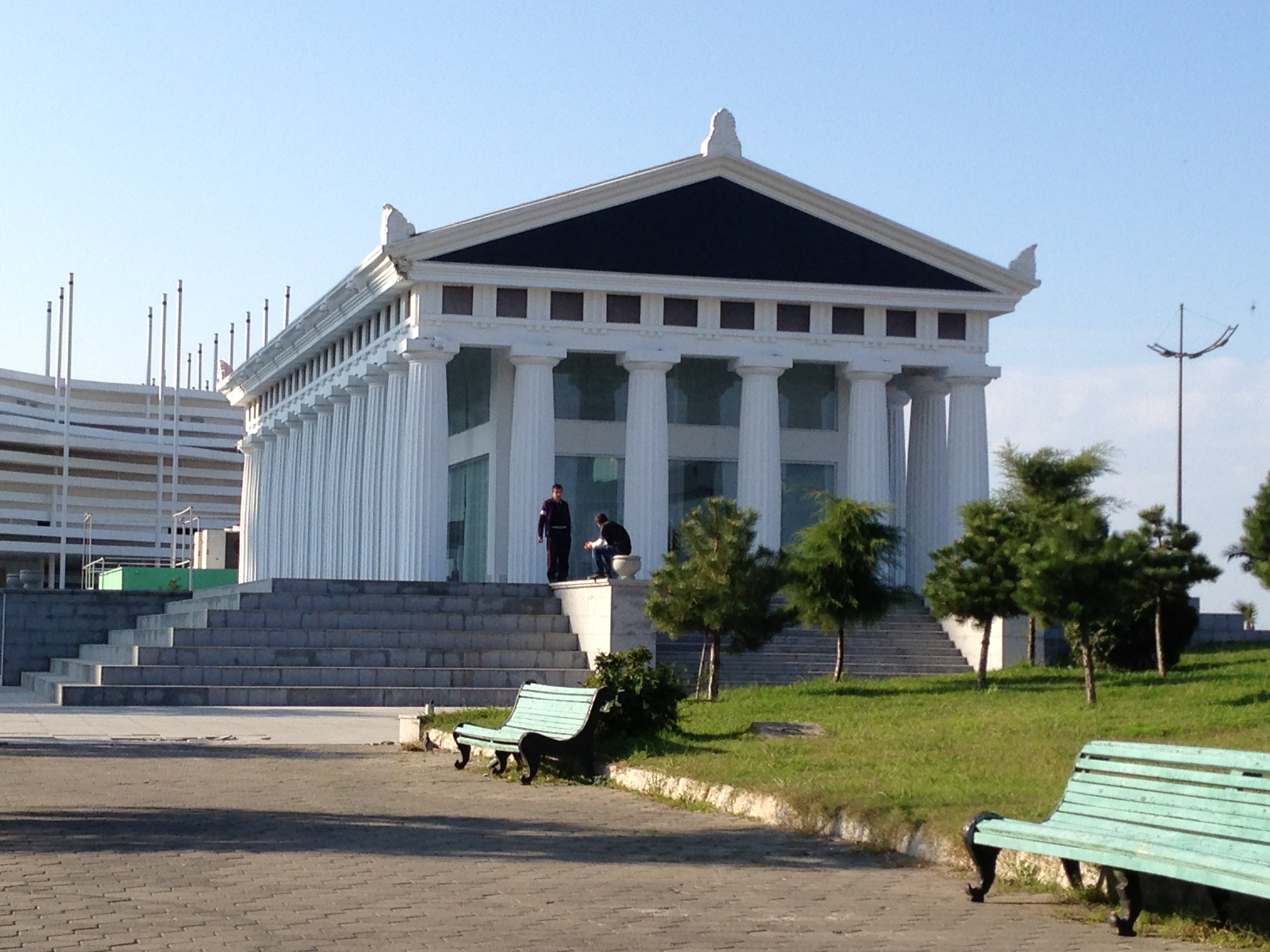
Batumi Acropolis

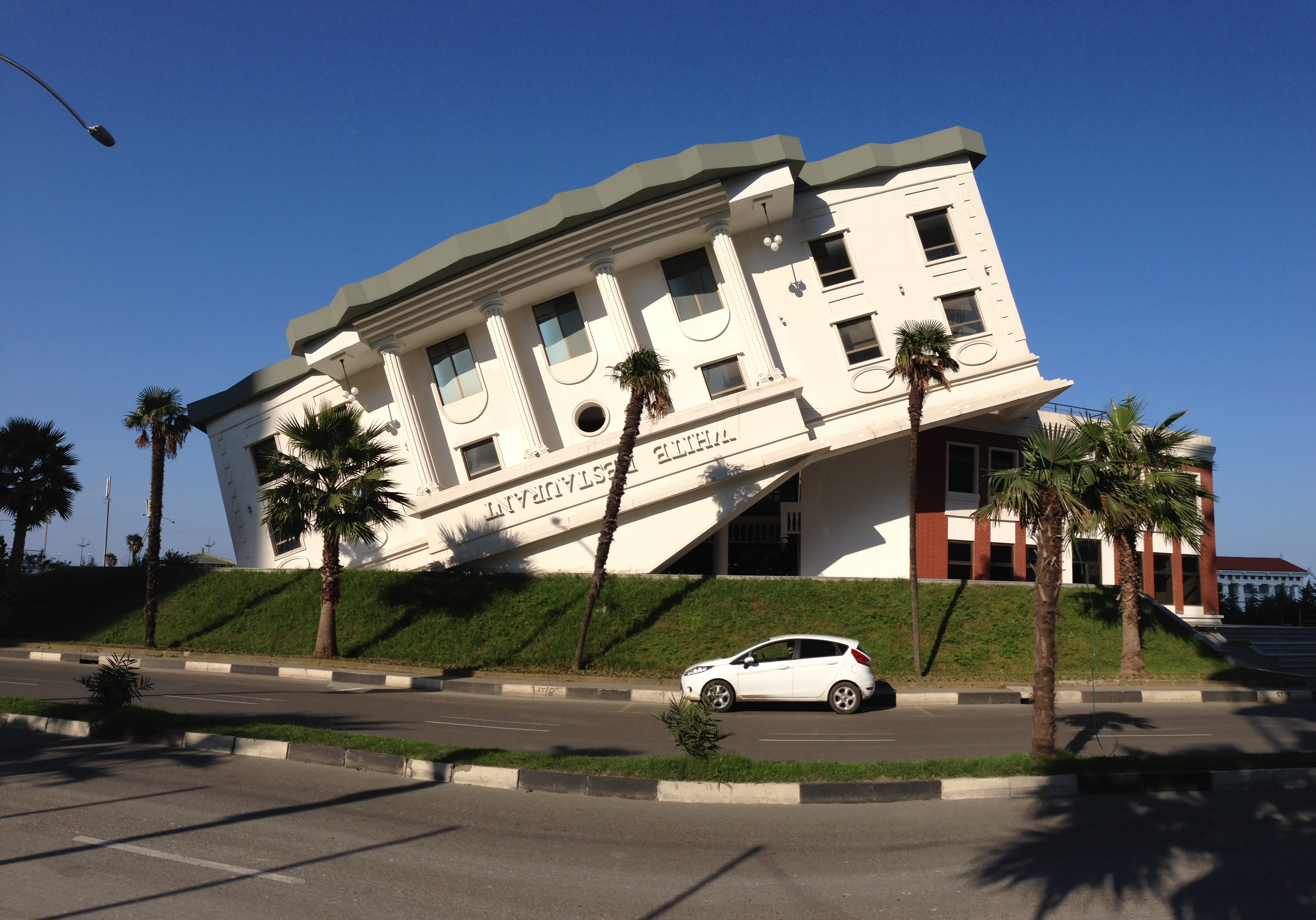
"Upright White House" in Batumi

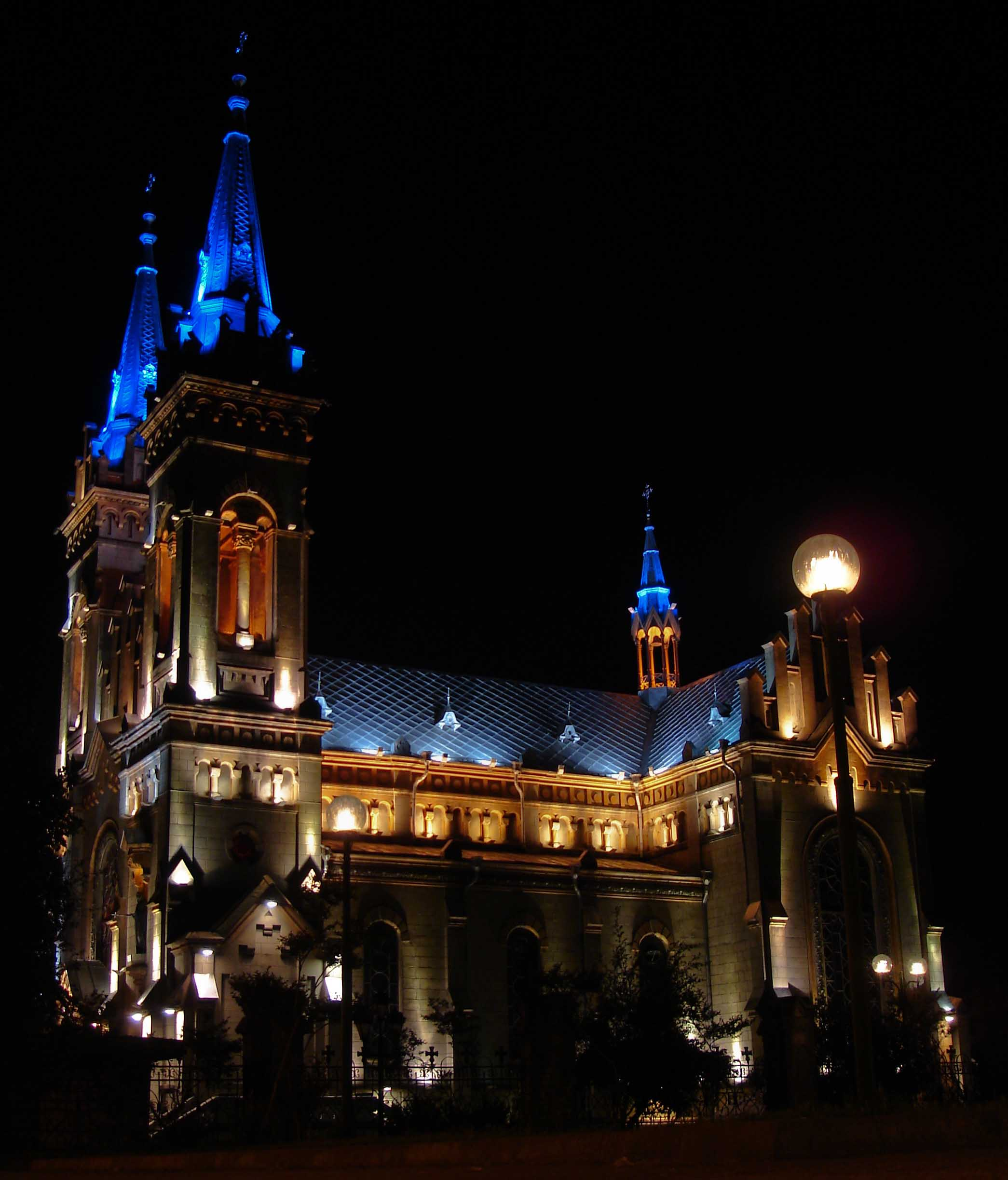
Batumi Mariam of God's Temple

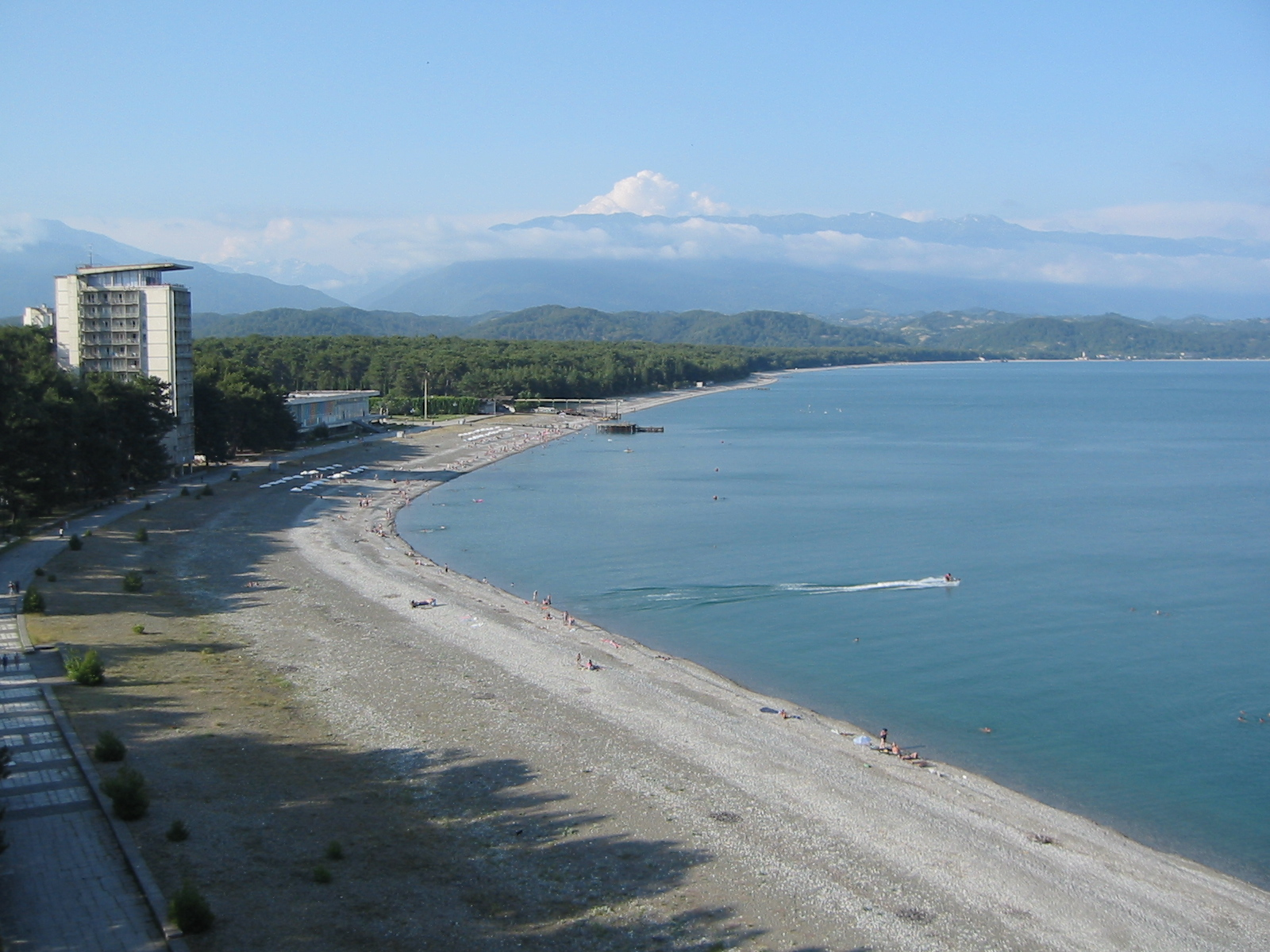
Black Sea coast of Georgia, Bichvinta

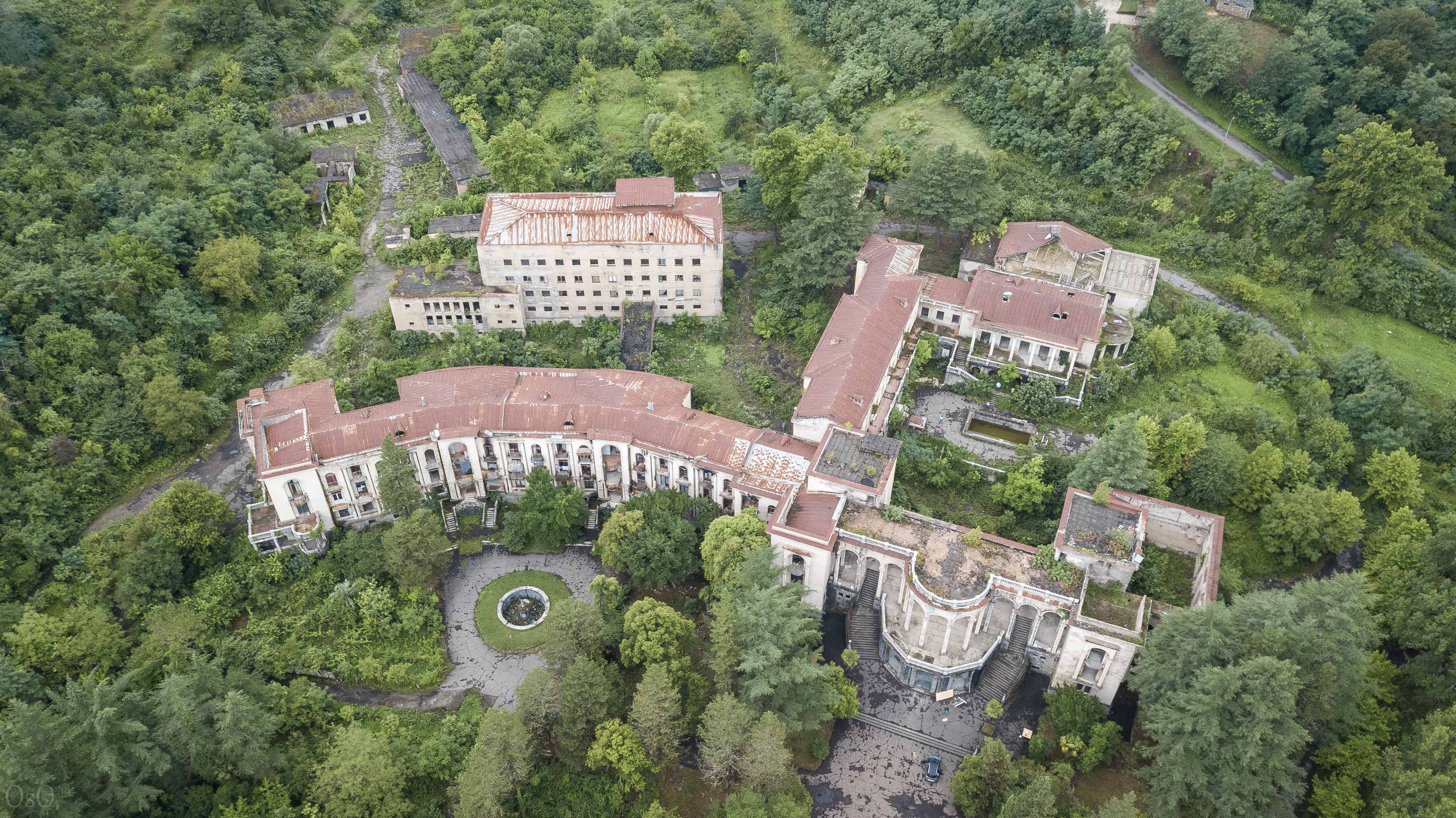
Abandoned Soviet sanatoriums in Tskaltubo

== See also ==
- Black Sea region
- Southern Coast (Crimea)
- Turkish Riviera
- Ancient Greek colonization of the Eastern Black Sea region
- Greater Caucasus, Colchis lowland, Lesser Caucasus, Transcaucasia
- Formation of the territory of the Russian Empire
- Tourism in Russia, Tourism in Abkhazia, Tourism in Georgia
