= Velvet season =

Russian term for early autumn

Velvet season (Russian: Бархатный сезон, Ukrainian: Оксамитовий сезон) is a term for early autumn, one of the most comfortable times of the year for people to vacation in the subtropics, particularly in the Mediterranean that was known as the "Russian Riviera". During the velvet season, the weather is not as hot as in mid-summer months, but is still quite warm, even at night. In North America, an analogy of "velvet season" is the Indian summer.

== Origins of term ==
The term appeared in the late nineteenth or early twentieth centuries in Imperial Russia when it was fashionable to vacation in the Crimea. According to Alexander Levintov, at the beginning of the twentieth century "velvet season" referred to several weeks in April and May, when the court and the royal family moved from St. Petersburg to the Crimea. Fur clothes were replaced with velvet, as the Crimea at this time was still cool. The summer in the Crimea was called calico season and September called plys season.

Although its origins relate to the nobility, the velvet season came to have a more general meaning. It is better defined by the general public's tastes, behaviors, and morals than by those of the nobility. By the 1900s, people traveled for the velvet season because it was fashionable and they were hoping to meet people, rather than because the court was traveling.

Although it has proven impossible to determine the exact point in time, at some point, the velvet season switched from referring to the spring to the fall, overlapping with the wool/silk seasons in August and September.

== In literature ==
The well-known Russian author Alexander Kuprin, described Velvet season in his 1914 short story "The Wine Barrel" (Винная Бочка):

These are golden days for Yalta, and, perhaps, for the entire Crimean coast. It lasts no more than a month and usually coincides with the last week of Lent, Easter and St. Thomas Sunday. Some people come in order to get rid of the sad need to make visits; others — as newlyweds making a wedding trip; and still others — the majority of them — because it is fashionable that at this time everything noble and rich is going to Yalta, that you can flash toilets and beauty, make profitable acquaintances. Of course, no one notices nature. And I must say that it is at this early spring time that Crimea, all in a pink and white frame of blooming apple trees, almonds, pears, peaches and apricots, not yet dusty, not fetid, refreshed by the magical sea air, is truly beautiful.
