= Indian summer =

Period of unseasonably warm weather in autumn

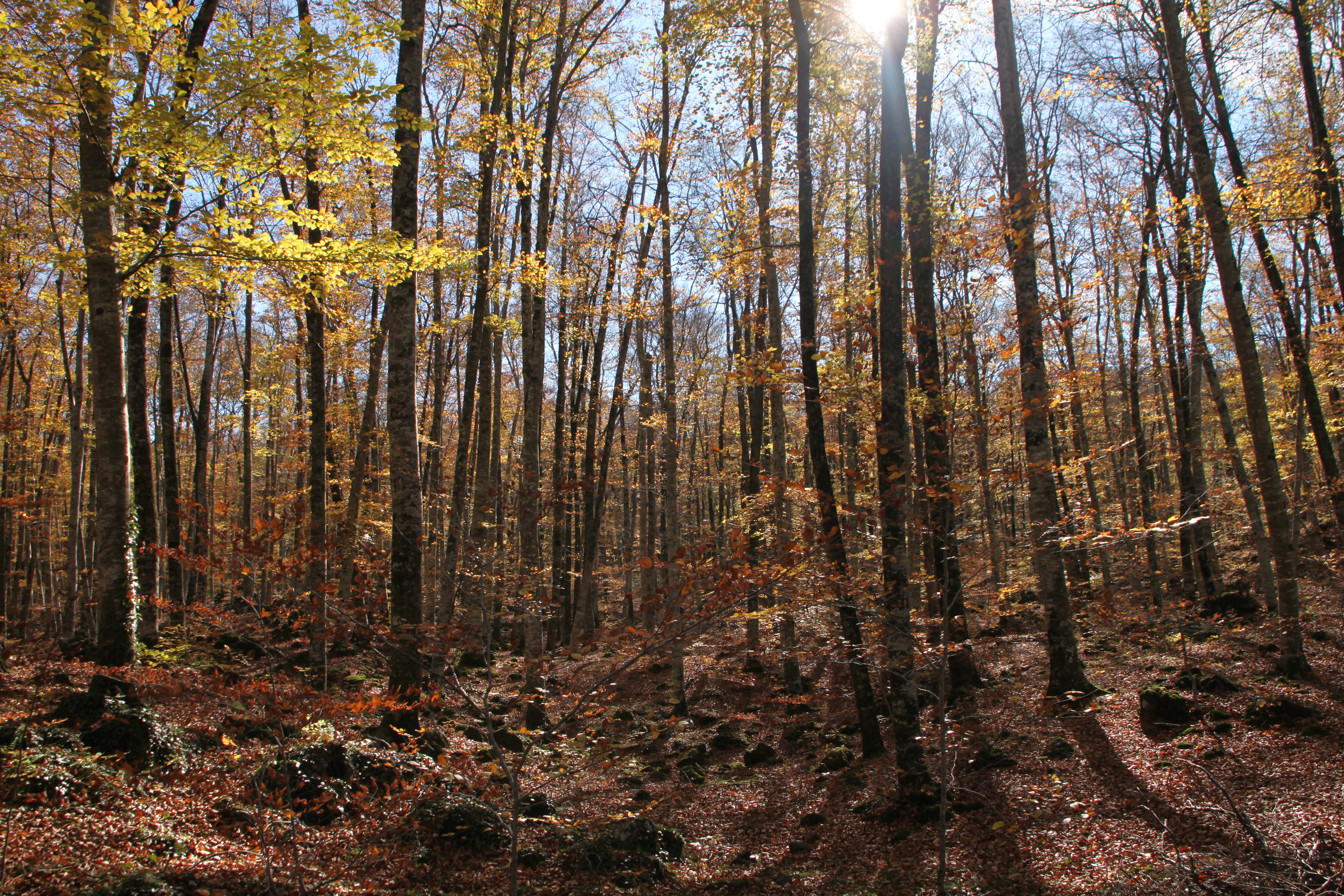
An Indian summer day in Fageda d'en Jordà, a beech forest located in Garrotxa county, Catalonia (Spain).

An Indian summer is a period of unseasonably warm, dry weather that sometimes occurs in autumn in temperate regions of the Northern Hemisphere. Several sources describe a true Indian summer as not occurring until after the first frost, or more specifically the first "killing frost."

== Etymology ==
The late 19th-century lexicographer Albert Matthews made an exhaustive search of early American literature in an attempt to discover who coined the expression. The earliest reference he found dated to 1851. He also found the phrase in a letter written in England in 1778, but discounted that as a coincidental use of the phrase.

Later research showed that the earliest known reference to Indian summer in its current sense occurs in an essay written in the United States around 1778 by J. Hector St. John de Crèvecœur, describing the character of autumn and implying the common usage of the expression.

Great rains at last replenish the springs, the brooks, the swamp and impregnate the earth. Then a severe frost succeeds which prepares it to receive the voluminous coat of snow which is soon to follow; though it is often preceded by a short interval of smoke and mildness, called the Indian Summer. This is in general the invariable rule: winter is not said properly to begin until those few moderate days & the raising of the water has announced it to Man.

The essay was first published in French around 1788, but remained unavailable in the United States until the 1920s.

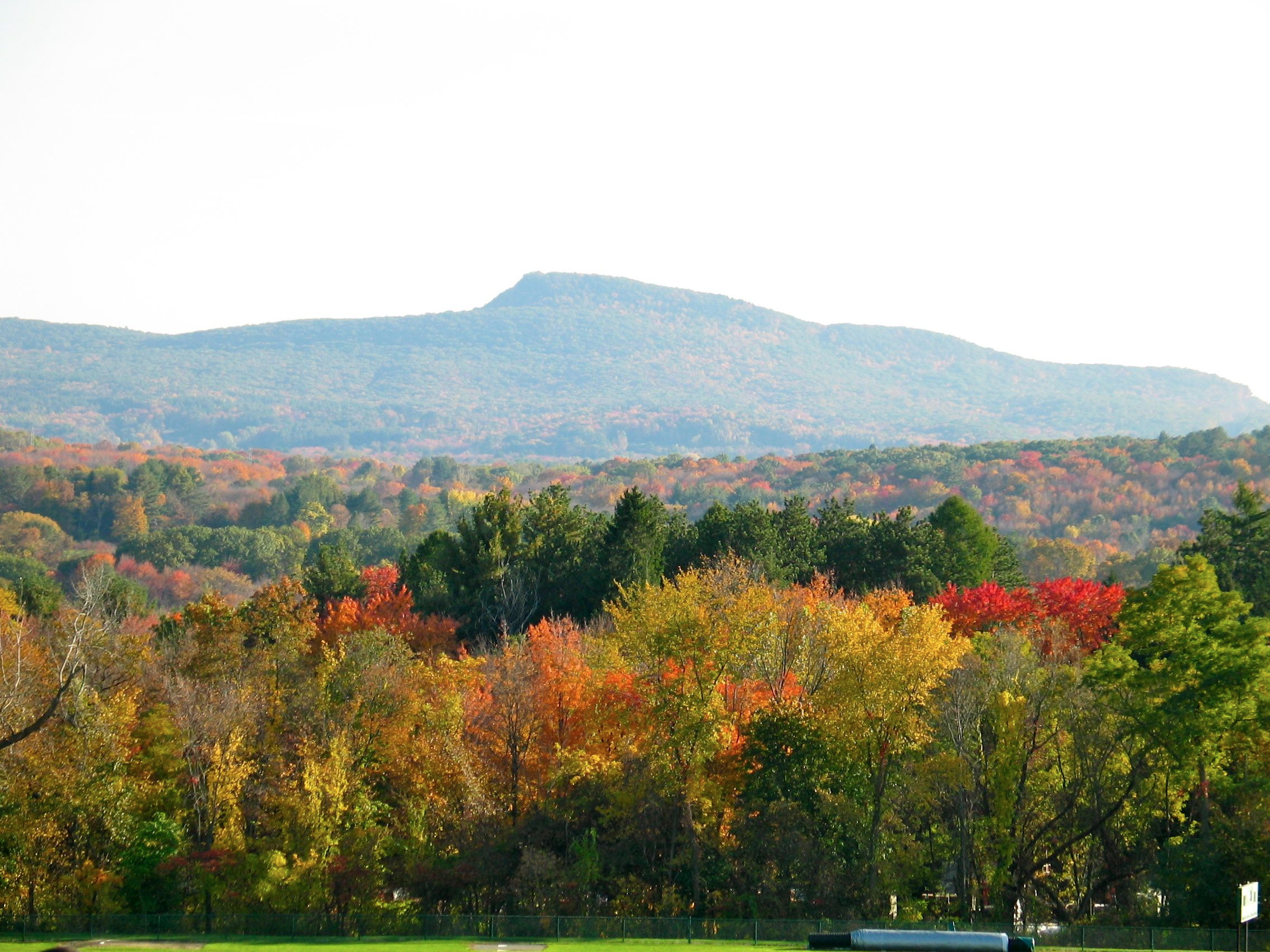
An Indian summer day in western Massachusetts, October 2008

Although the exact origins of the term are uncertain, it was perhaps so-called because it was first noted in regions inhabited by Native Americans, or because the natives first described it to Europeans, or it had been based on the warm and hazy conditions in autumn when Native Americans hunted. John James Audubon wrote about "The Indian Summer that extraordinary phenomenon of North America" in his journal on November 20, 1820. He mentions the "constant Smoky atmosphere" and how the smoke irritates his eyes. Audubon suspects that the condition of the air was caused by "Indians, firing the Prairies of the West". Audubon also mentions in many other places in his writings the reliance Native Americans had on fire. At no point does Audubon relate an Indian summer to warm temperatures during the cold seasons.

Because the warm weather is not a permanent gift, a connection has been made to the pejorative term Indian giver. Native-American legends mention the god or "Life-Giver" bestowing warm autumnal weather to various warriors or peoples, enabling them to survive after great misfortune, such as loss of crops.

== Usage ==
Weather historian William R. Deedler wrote that "Indian summer" can be defined as "any spell of warm, quiet, hazy weather that may occur in October or November", though he noted that he "was surprised to read that Indian summers have been given credit for warm spells as late as December and January". Deedler also noted that some writers use Indian summer in reference to the weather in only New England, "while others have stated it happens over most of the United States, even along the Pacific coast".

In literature and history, the term is sometimes used metaphorically. The title of Van Wyck Brooks' New England: Indian Summer (1940) suggests an era of inconsistency, infertility, and depleted capabilities, a period of seemingly robust strength that is only an imitation of an earlier season of actual strength. William Dean Howells' 1886 novel Indian Summer uses the term to mean a time when one may recover some of the happiness of youth. The main character, jilted as a young man, leads a solitary life until he rediscovers romance in early middle age.

In British English, the term is used in the same way as in North America. In the UK it was first used in the early 19th century, and there was an early example in The Guardian which ran an article explaining the phrase "Indian summer" to its readers in 1837, written by someone who had lived in the US but questioned whether Native Americans had influenced the origins. The UK Met Office Meteorological Glossary published in 1916 defines an Indian summer as "a warm, calm spell of weather occurring in autumn, especially in October and November", while The Indian Summer of a Forsyte is the metaphorical title of the 1918 second volume of The Forsyte Saga by John Galsworthy. However, early 20th-century climatologists Gordon Manley and Hubert Lamb used it only when referring to the American phenomenon, and the expression did not gain wide currency in Great Britain until the 1950s. In former times, variations of "Saint Martin's summer" were widely used across Europe to describe warm weather surrounding autumn feast days of St. Martin and Saint Luke.

In the English translation of Boris Pasternak's Doctor Zhivago, the term is used to describe the unseasonably warm weather leading up to the October Revolution.

== Other names and similar phenomena ==
Similar weather conditions with local variations also exist. A warm period in autumn is called Altweibersommer ("old women's summer") in Germany, Austria, Switzerland, Lithuania (Lithuanian: bobų vasara), Hungary (Hungarian: vénasszonyok nyara), Estonia (Estonian: vananaistesuvi), and in a number of Slavic-language countries—for example, in the Czech Republic, Ukraine, Poland, Slovakia, Russia and Slovenia, – it is known as "(old) women's summer" (German: Altweibersommer; Czech: babí léto; Ukrainian: бабине літо, IPA: [ˈbɑbɪne ˈl⁽ʲ⁾ito]; Polish: babie lato; Slovak: babie leto; Russian: бабье лето, IPA: [ˈbabʲjɪ ˈlʲetə]). In Bulgaria, it is known as "gypsy summer" or "poor man's summer", and in Serbia it is known as "Miholjsko leto" because Saint Michael or "Miholjdan" is celebrated on October 12. In Sweden, there's "Brittsommar" (out of "Birgitta" and "Britta", having their name days around the time, on October 7) and/or "Indiansommar" as a direct translation from English. In Finland, the period is today called Finnish: intiaanikesä, a direct translation, but historically a warm period in autumn was named after Bartholomew (Finnish: Pärttyli or Perttu), his feast day being in late August. In Irish, the phenomenon is called fómhar beag na ngéanna ("little autumn of the geese"), because it is around this time that geese have been fattened enough for eating. In Spain it is also known as el veranillo del membrillo ("little summer of the quince tree") or el sol del membrillo ("the sun of the quince tree").

In temperate parts of South America—such as southernmost Brazil, Argentina, Chile and Uruguay—the phenomenon is known as "Veranico", "Veranito" or "Veranillo" (literally, "little summer"), and usually occurs in early autumn, between late April and mid-May, when it is known as "Veranico de Maio" ("May's little summer") or as "Veranito de San Juan" ("Saint John's little summer"). Its onset and duration are directly associated with the occurrence of El Niño.

In other countries, it is associated with autumnal name days or saint days, such as Teresa of Ávila (Portugal, Spain and France), St. Martin's Summer (Spain, France, Italy, Portugal and Malta), St. Michael's summer (Veranillo de San Miguel in Spain, Miholjsko leto, Serbia, Montenegro and Bosnia and Herzegovina), St. Martin's Day (Netherlands and Italy), St. Demetrius (Greece and Cyprus), Bridget of Sweden in Sweden, and Saint Michael the Archangel in Wales (Welsh: haf bach Mihangel). In Turkey, it is called pastırma yazı, meaning "pastrami summer", since the month of November was considered to be the best time to make pastırma (the meat from which pastrami, though slightly different, originated).

The American Meteorological Society (AMS) also notes that a similar phenomenon may be referred to poetically as halcyon days, a term that originated in Greek mythology. Halcyon days in Greece take place in winter, usually 16–31 of January and last around 4–7 days with extremely warm and sunny days. "All-hallown summer" or "All Saints' summer" is also referenced in English folklore and by Shakespeare, but its use appears to have died out.

== In media ==
=== Books, comics, and poetry ===
- Indian Summer was written by Adalbert Stifter in 1857.
- Indian Summer was written by William Dean Howells in 1886.
- Indian Summer: The Secret History of the End of an Empire was written by Alex von Tunzelmann in 2007.
- Injun Summer, John T. McCutcheon, Chicago Tribune, September 30, 1907.
- Jayanta Mahapatra wrote "Indian Summer".

=== Music ===
- "L'Été indien" or "Indian Summer", a 1975 French song by Joe Dassin
- In 1977, Poco released the album Indian Summer, which contained the title track written by Paul Cotton.
- In 1992, Go West released an album called Indian Summer.
- In 1993, the emo band Indian Summer was formed in Oakland, California. They disbanded in 1994.
- In 2004, Carbon Leaf released a collection of all-original songs on their album, Indian Summer released on Vanguard Records.
- In 2009, country duo Brooks and Dunn released their own "Indian Summer", as the lead single to their fifth greatest hits package, #1s… and Then Some.
- In 2010, Australian record producer Gabriel Gleeson began releasing electronic music and performing under the name Indian Summer.
- In 2013, Stereophonics released the Kelly Jones penned "Indian Summer", as the second single from their album Graffiti on the Train.
- Victor Herbert composed the song "Indian Summer" in 1919 for classical orchestra and Al Dubin wrote lyrics in 1939.

=== Painting ===
In 1875, Józef Chełmoński painted a picture Indian Summer with a wide landscape panorama.

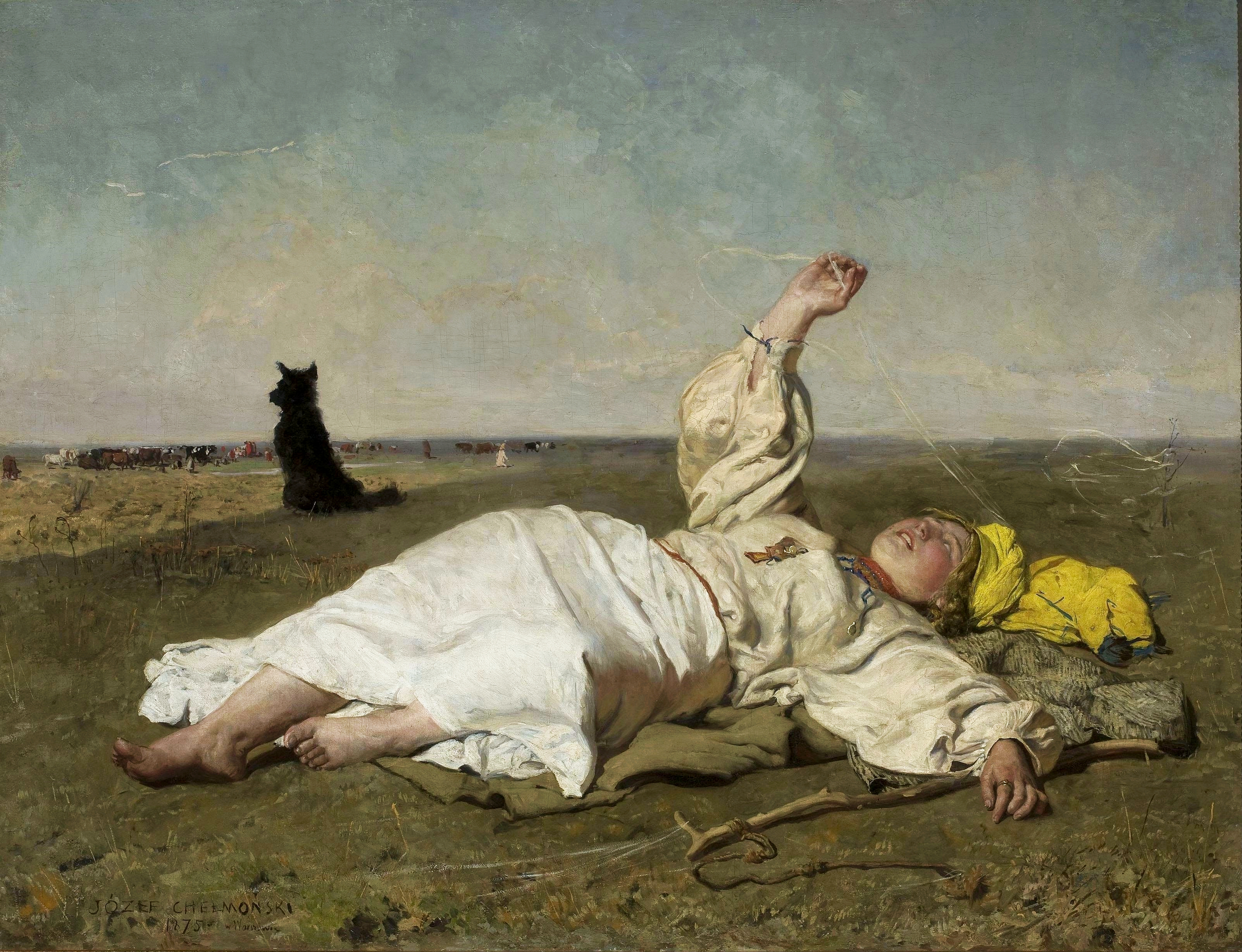
Józef Chełmoński: Indian Summer, Oil-on-canvas, 1875, Dimensions 119.7 cm × 156.5 cm (47.1 in × 61.6 in), National Museum, Warsaw

== See also ==
- Blackberry winter
- Dog days
- Velvet season
