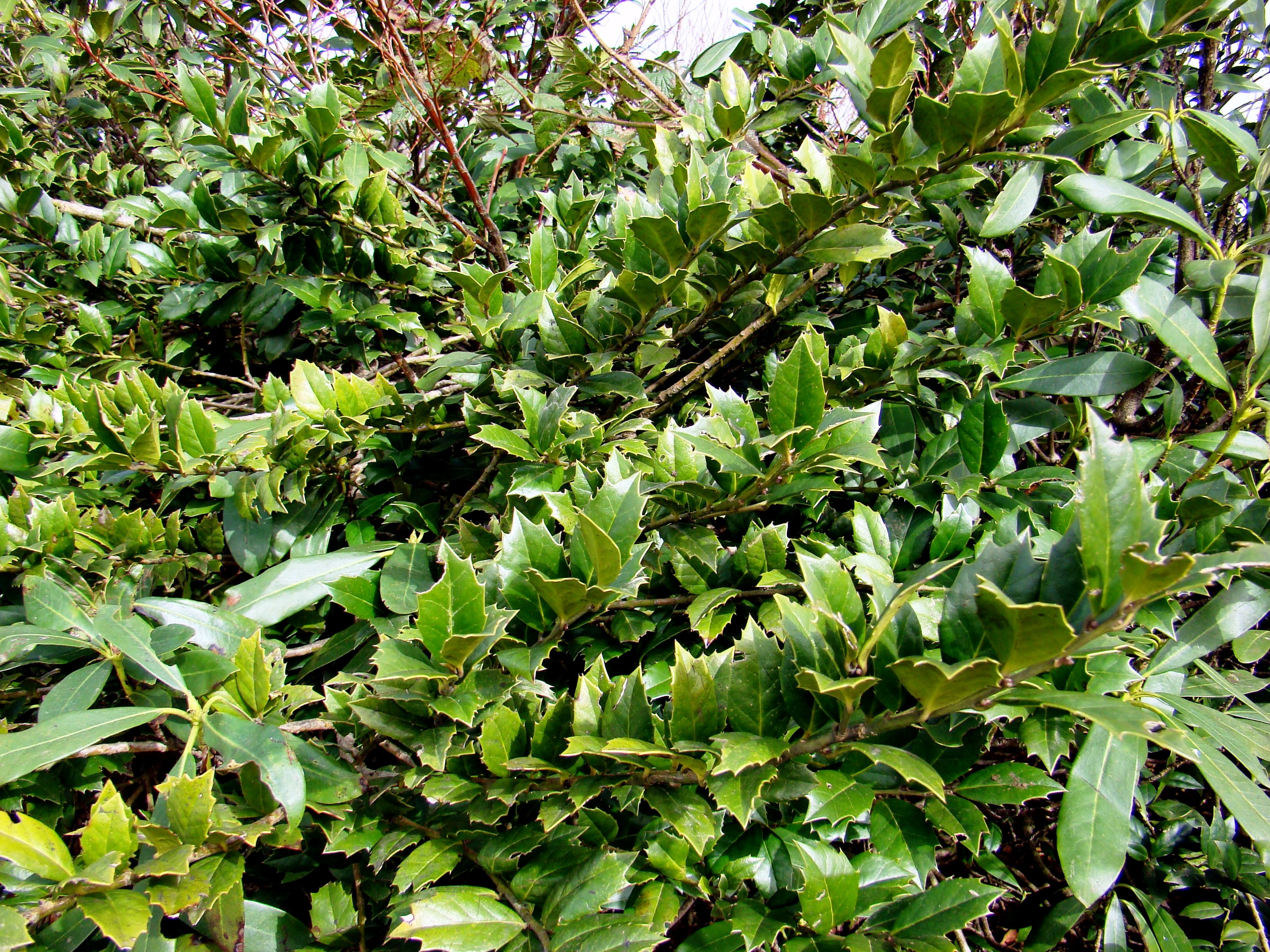

Scientific classification
- Kingdom: Plantae
- Clade: Tracheophytes
- Clade: Angiosperms
- Clade: Eudicots
- Clade: Asterids
- Order: Aquifoliales
- Family: Aquifoliaceae
- Genus: Ilex
- Species: I. colchica

Binomial name
- Ilex colchica Pojark.

= Ilex colchica =

Species of holly

Ilex colchica, commonly known as Colchic- or Black Sea holly, is a species of holly native to Bulgaria, Turkey and the Caucasus.

The specific epithet colchica refers to Colchis.
