= Dagomys railway station =

Railway station in Sochi, Russia

Coordinates: 43°39′12″N 39°38′52″E

Dagomys Станция Дагомыс
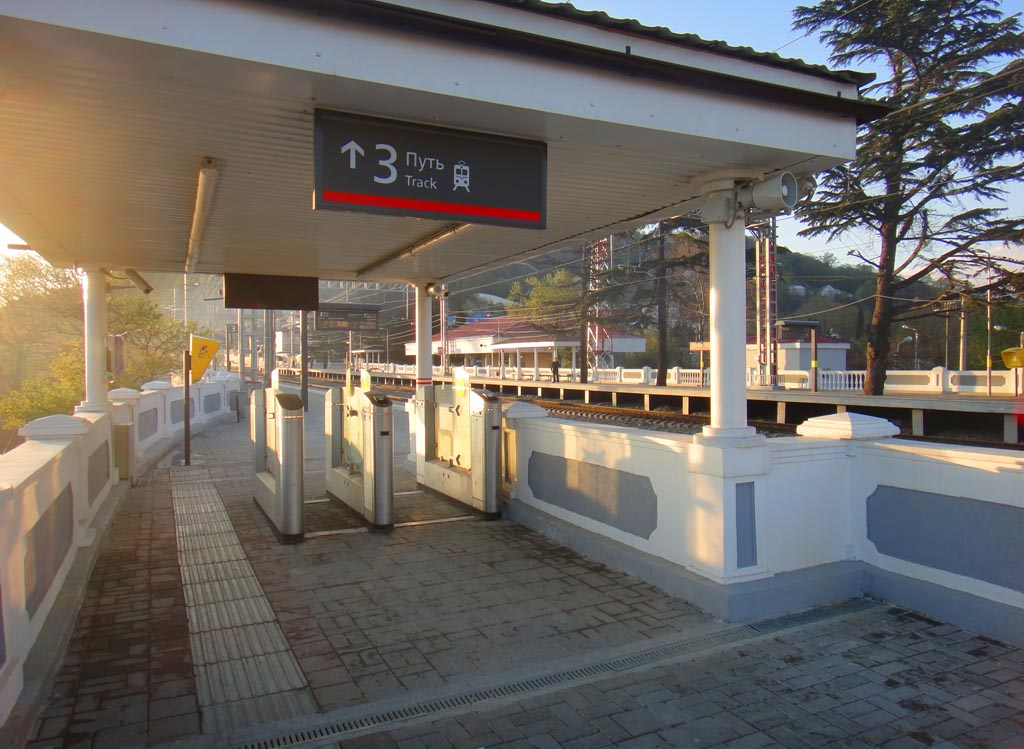
- Dagomys railway station in 2013

General information
- Location: Dagomys Microdistrict, Lazarevsky city district, Sochi; Krasnodar Krai; Russia
- Owner: Russian Railways
- Operator: North Caucasus Railway
- Platforms: 2
- Tracks: 3

Construction
- Structure type: At-grade
- Parking: Yes

History
- Opened: 1929

Services
Preceding station	Russian Railways	Following station
Uch-Dere towards Krivenkovskaya	Krivenkovskaya–Vesioloye	Mamayka towards Vesyoloye
Location

Dagomys railway station (Russian: Станция Дагомыс) is a railway station of the North Caucasus Railway, a subsidiary of Russian Railways, located in Dagomys Microdistrict, Lazarevsky City District of Sochi, Krasnodar Krai, Russia.

== History ==
The station was opened in 1929. In Soviet times, the station served as a stopping point for some long-distance passenger trains. Later, only local electric commuter trains called at the station. Because the long-distance trains did not stop here anymore, Dagomys suffered from the reduced number of tourists.

As of 2014, all local trains connecting Sochi and Tuapse via Lazarevskaya called at Dagomys, while long-distance trains did not stop. In 2013, construction of a new station building and modern terminals began for the upcoming 2014 Winter Olympics.
