= Vardanes =

Vardanes was the name of two kings of Parthia:

- Vardanes I (c. 40–47)
- Vardanes II (c. 55–58)

== See also ==
- Vardane Microdistrict, a microdistrict of the city of Sochi, Krasnodar Krai, Russia
- Vardane, the summit of Sulafjellet, a mountain on the island of Sula in Western Norway
- Vardan, a given name
