= Lazarevsky city district =

Lazarevsky city district Лазаревский внутригородской район (Russian)
- District
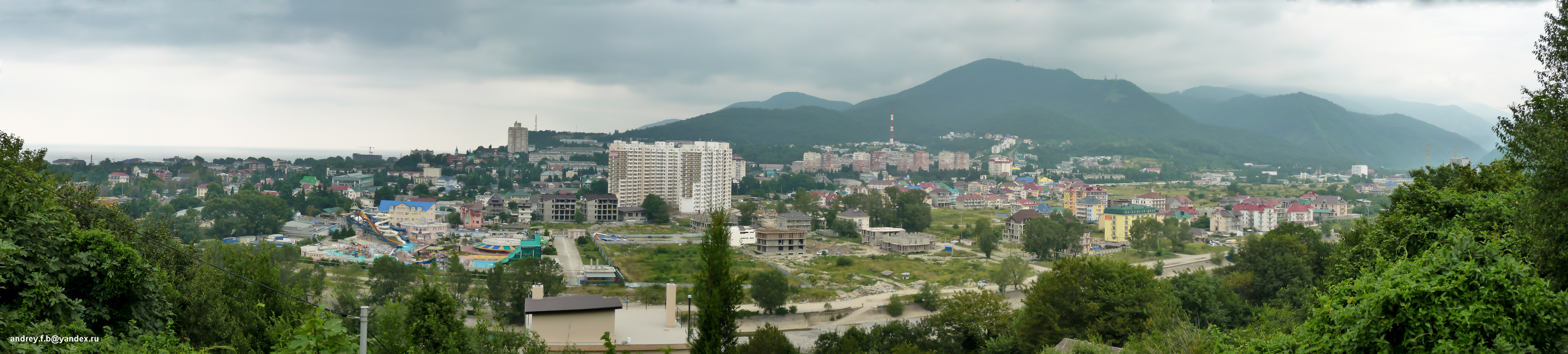
- Panorama of the district from the center of Sochi

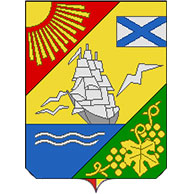
- Coat of arms
- Lazarevsky city district in Sochi
- Coordinates: 43°48′N 39°30′E
- Country: Russia
- Federal subject: Krasnodar Krai
- City: Sochi
- Established: 10 February 1961
- Administrative center: Lazarevskoye Microdistrict

Population (2010 Census)
  - Total: 63,894

Administrative structure
  - Administrative divisions: 6 rural okrugs

Lazarevsky city district (Russian: Лазаревский райо́н) is one of four city districts of the city of Sochi in Krasnodar Krai, Russia. The city district borders Tuapsinsky District in the northwest, Apsheronsky District in the north, Maykopsky District of the Republic of Adygea in the northeast, Khostinsky city district in the east, and Tsentralny city district in the south. The administration of the district is located in Lazarevskoye Microdistrict. In the southwest, it is bordered by the Black Sea. Population: 63,894 (2010 census); 63,239 (2002 census); 64,006 (1989 Soviet census).

== Geography ==
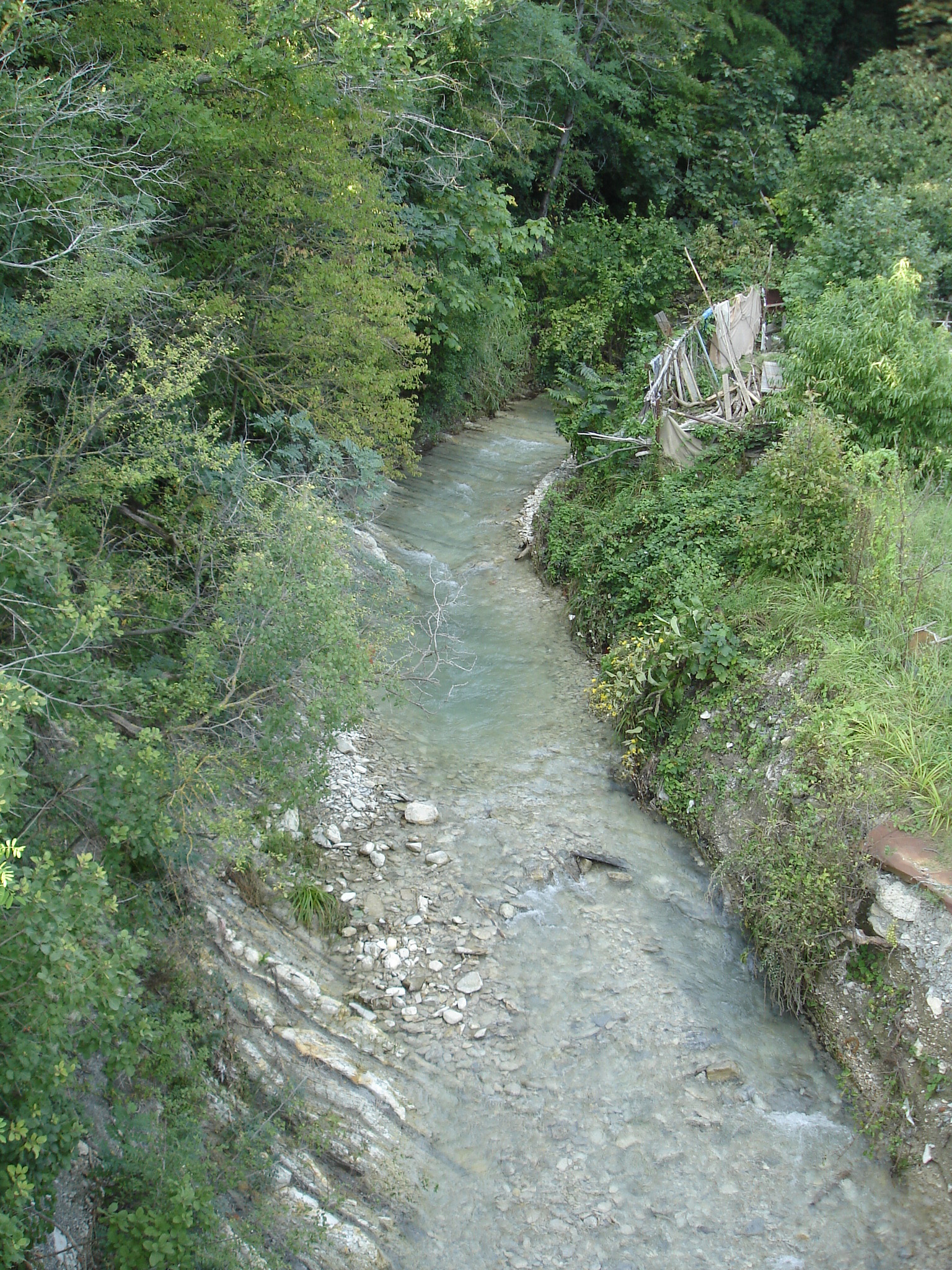
The Magri River

The district is located on the slopes of the Western Caucasus, which descend to the Black Sea. The coast within the district runs from northwest to southeast. The majority of the population of the district lives at or close to the seashore, in former settlements later turned microdistricts. The biggest of them are (northwest to southeast) Vishnevka, Makopse, Sovet-Kvadzhe, Ashe, Lazarevskoye, Volkonka, Chemitokvadzhe, Golovinka, Yakornaya Shchel, Nizhnyaya Beranda, Vardane, Loo, Uchdere, and Dagomys. Dagomys is essentially a suburb of the center of Sochi. Further inland, there are mountains, separated by river valleys. The biggest rivers within the district are the Ashe River and the Shakhe River. The northeastern part of the district belongs to the Caucasus Zapovednik, a huge protected area spanning parts of Krasnodar Krai and Adygea. Much of the remaining area of the district, except for the coastal area, belongs to Sochi National Park.

The city district includes six rural okrugs:

- Kichmaysky rural okrug
- Kirovsky rural okrug
- Lygotkhsky rural okrug
- Solokhaulsky rural okrug
- Verkhneloosky rural okrug
- Volkovsky rural okrug

== History ==
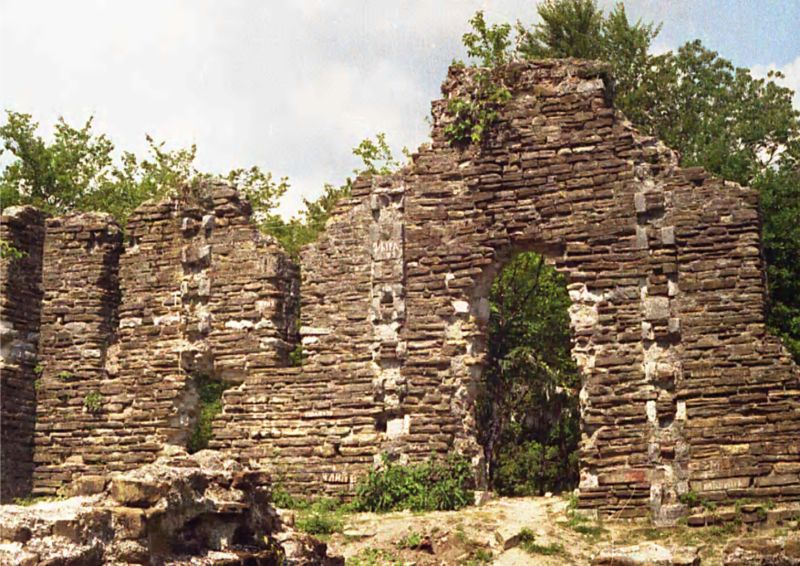
Byzantine church in Loo

The eastern shore of the Black Sea was populated from the antiquity, often changing allegiations. There are archeological sites within the district, including the Byzantine Church in Loo, which provide evidence of presence of the Byzantine Empire and the Republic of Genoa in the Middle Ages. Eventually the area was taken by the Ottoman Empire, and after the Russo-Turkish War of 1828–29 was occupied by the Russian Empire. A number of forts were constructed by Russians, including Lazarevsky and Golovinsky Forts. The native population, the Ubykh, were forcibly resettled in the 1860s. The area remained underdeveloped, and only in 1866 Black Sea okrug with the administrative center in Novorossiysk was established to administer the area. Since 1870, it was subdivided into three parts, one of which was administered from Dakhovsky, currently the center of Sochi. In 1888, Black Sea okrug was merged into Kuban Oblast. In 1896, it was transformed into Black Sea Governorate with the center in Novorossiysk. The area was a part of Sochi okrug.

Soviet Power was declared in Sochi in February 1918, followed by the advance of the army of the Democratic Republic of Georgia, which in July 1918 occupied the whole coast up to Tuapse. In February 1919, they were driven back by the Volunteer Army under command of Anton Denikin. Between January and May 1920, the Red Army recaptured the area.

In March 1918, the governorate was abolished, an after the end of the Civil War ended up as Black Sea okrug of Kuban-Black Sea Oblast. On June 30, 1920, the okrug was split into divisions, and the area was included into Tuapse Division. On May 18, 1922 the divisions were abolished, and on January 26, 1923 the okrug was subdivided into five districts. The area was included into Tuapsinsky District with the administrative center in Tuapse. On June 2, 1924 Kuban-Black Sea Oblast was abolished, and Black Sea okrug was included into South-Eastern Oblast. In September 1924, Shapsug national district with the administrative center in Tuapse was created, and the area was transferred to this district. Lazarevskoye remained in Tuapsinsky District. South-Eastern Oblast was abolished on October 16, 1924, and the district was transferred to newly established North Caucasus Krai. In July 1930, okrugs were abolished, and Shapsugsky national district was directly subordinated to the krai. In 1930, the center of Shapsugsky national district was transferred to Krasnoaleksandrovskoye, in March 1931 – to Sovet-Kvadzhe, and in January 1934 Lazarevskoye was transferred to Shapsugsky national district as well and became the district center.

In 1933, it was decided to totally reconstruct the coastal area and to create a large number of spa resorts. On January 10, 1934 Azov-Black Sea Krai split off North Caucasus Krai. On September 13, 1937 it was abolished and split into Krasnodar Krai and Rostov Oblast. Shapsugsky District was transferred to Krasnodar Krai. On May 24, 1945 Shapsugsky District was renamed Lazarevsky District.

In 1961, Lazarevsky District was transferred to the city of Sochi. Afterwards, it has been known as Lazarevsky city district.

== Economy ==
The district, likewise other parts of Sochi, mostly serves as holiday destination and is oriented towards beach holidays.

=== Transportation ===
The railway connecting Tuapse and Adler runs along the coast through the whole district. There is frequent suburban service between Sochi and Tuapse, as well as long-distance passenger service. The principal railway stations within the district are Lazarevskaya, Yakornaya Shchel, Loo, and Dagomys.

The M27 Highway connecting Novorossiysk with Adler crosses the district, closely following the coast. There are roads up to the valleys of some of the rivers, but there are no through roads to Adygea or districts of Krasnodar Krai. Dagomys is a part of the road network of the center of Sochi.

== Culture and recreation ==
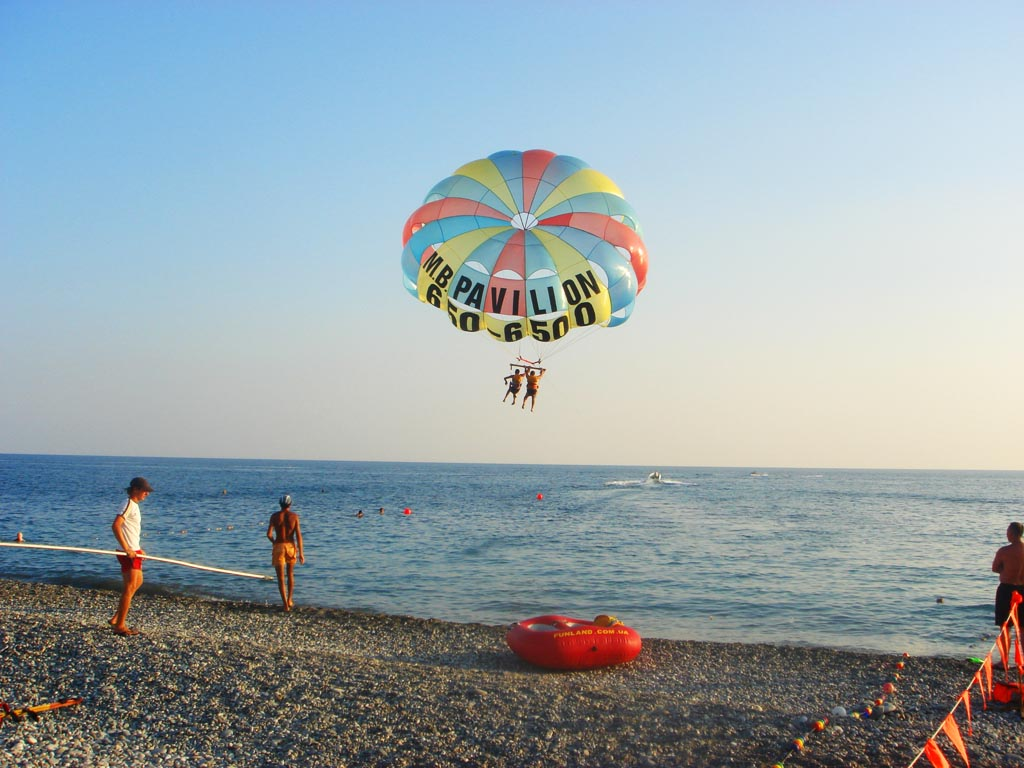
Paragliding in Dagomys

Lazarevsky city district is fully oriented to beach holidays, and the corresponding infrastructure includes, for example, two water parks and a dolphinarium in Lazarevskoye and a water park in Loo.

The district contains a large amount of archaeological monuments of various cultures, which include, among others, megalithic dolmens, Genoese Fort Godlik at the mouth of the Godlik River, Byzantine Church in Loo, and ruins of Fort Lazarev in Lazarevskoye. There are ethnographic museums in Lazarevskoye and Thagapsh.

== See also ==
- City districts of Sochi
