= Loo railway station =

Railway station in Sochi, Russia

Coordinates: 43°41′59″N 39°35′13″E

Loo Станция Лоо
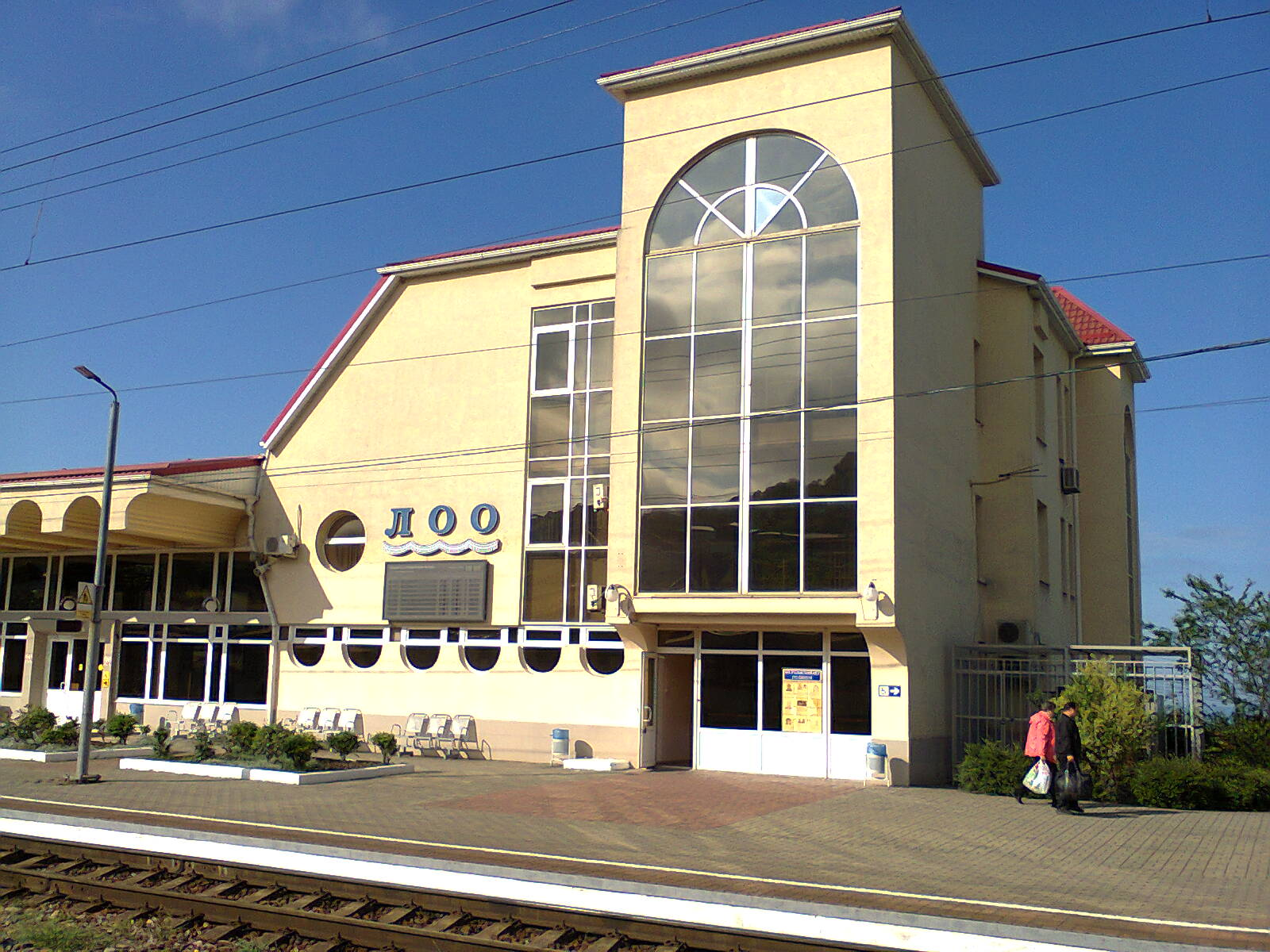
- Loo railway station in 2016

General information
- Location: Loo Microdistrict, Lazarevsky city district, Sochi; Krasnodar Krai; Russia
- Owner: Russian Railways
- Operator: North Caucasus Railway
- Platforms: 2
- Tracks: 3

Construction
- Structure type: At-grade
- Parking: Yes

History
- Opened: 1963

Services
Preceding station	Russian Railways	Following station
Lesnaya towards Krivenkovskaya	Krivenkovskaya–Vesioloye	Gorny Vozdukh towards Vesyoloye
Location

Loo railway station (Russian: Станция Лоо) is a railway station of the North Caucasus Railway, subsidiary of Russian Railways, located in Loo Microdistrict, Lazarevsky City District of Sochi, Krasnodar Krai, Russia. The station was opened in 1918.
