= Dagomys =

Dagomys Дагомыс
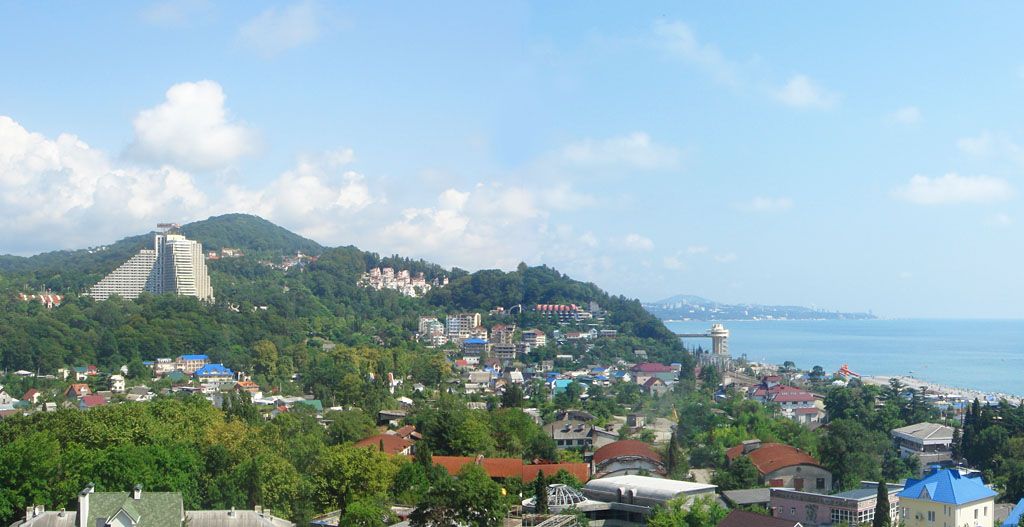
- Interactive map of Dagomys
- Location of Dagomys Dagomys (Krasnodar Krai)
- Country: Russia
- Federal subject: Krasnodar Krai
- Elevation: 16 m (52 ft)

Population
  - Estimate (2023): 17,841 )
- Time zone: UTC+3 (MSK)
- Postal code: 354207
- OKTMO ID: 03726000053

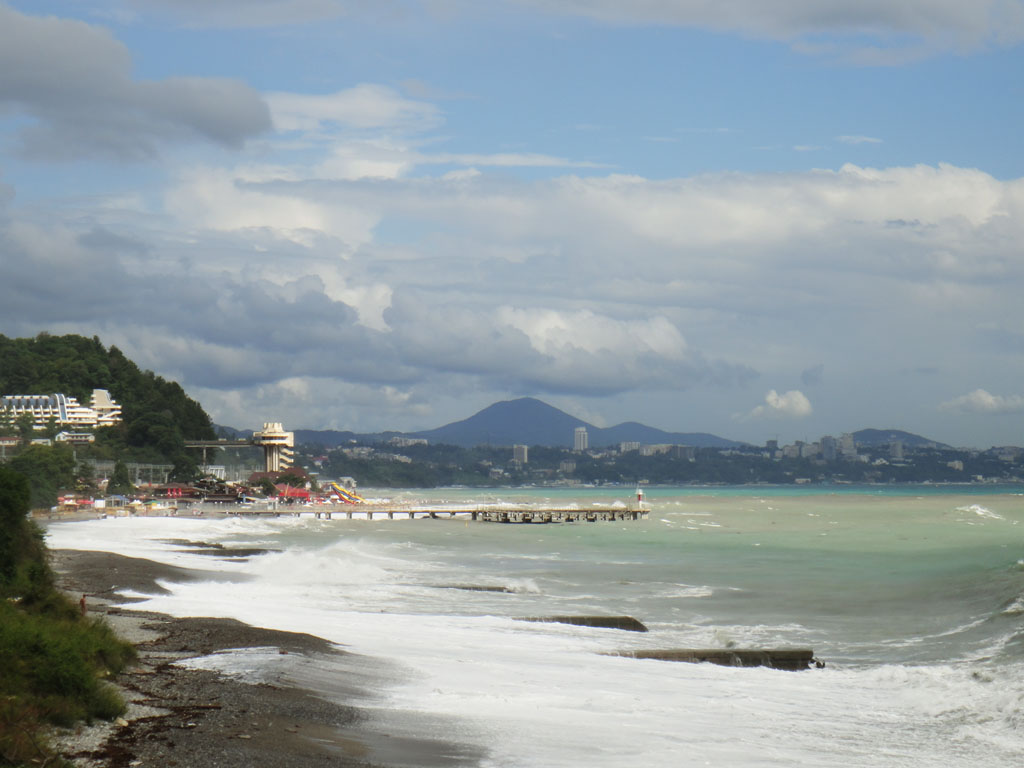
Dagomys: sea storm and Sochi view

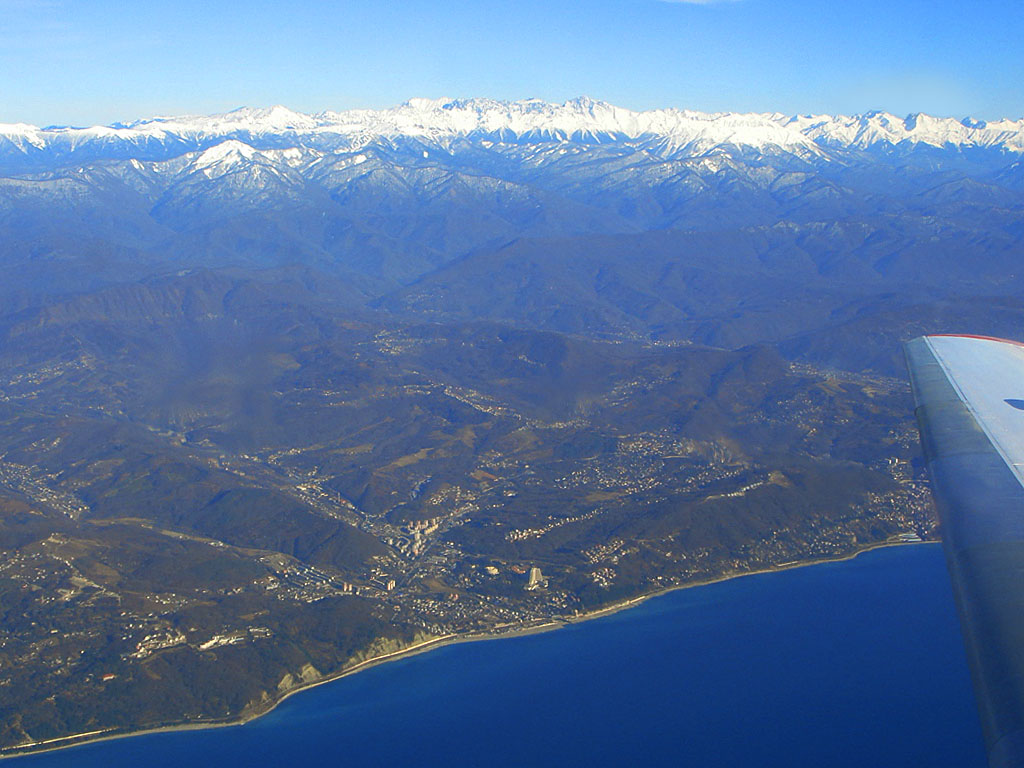
Dagomys and Great Caucasian Ridge - view from the plane

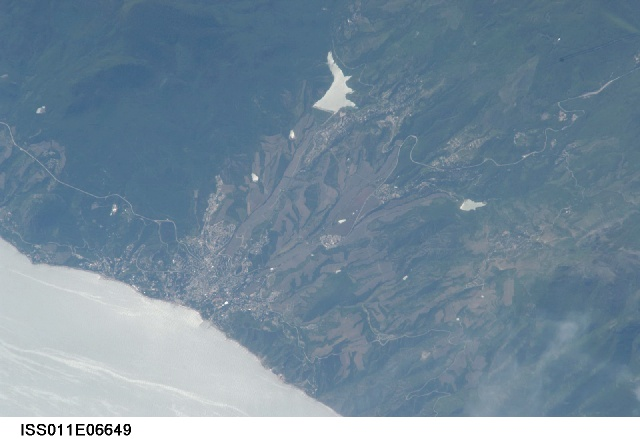
View of Dagomys from space.

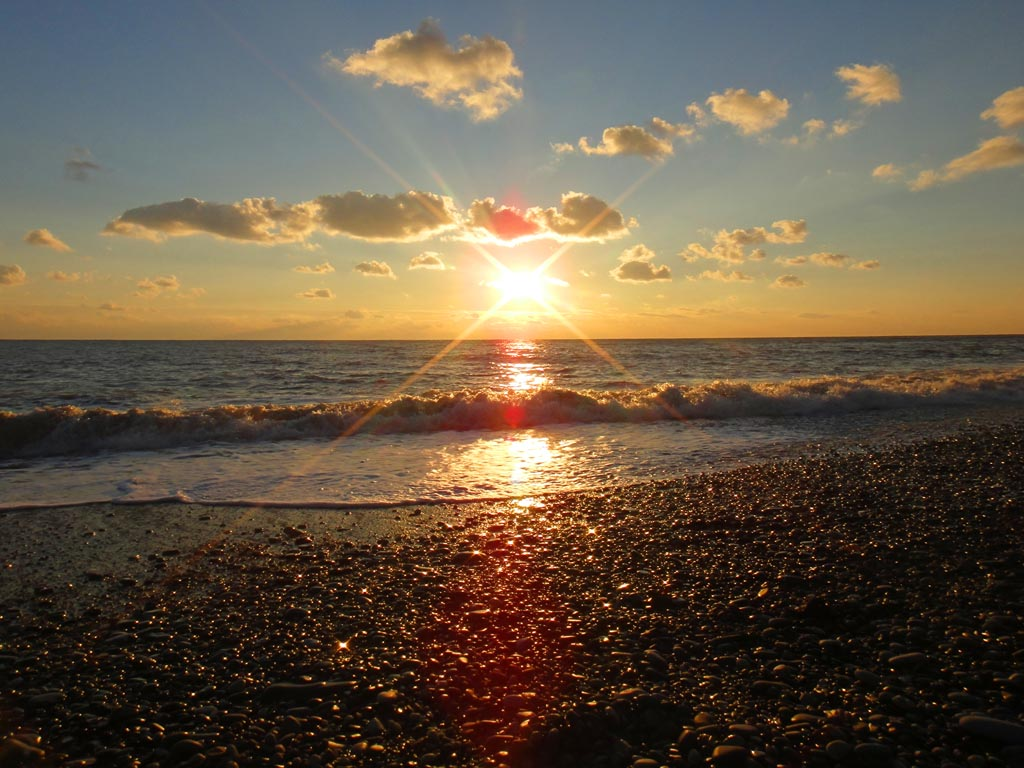
Dagomys sunset

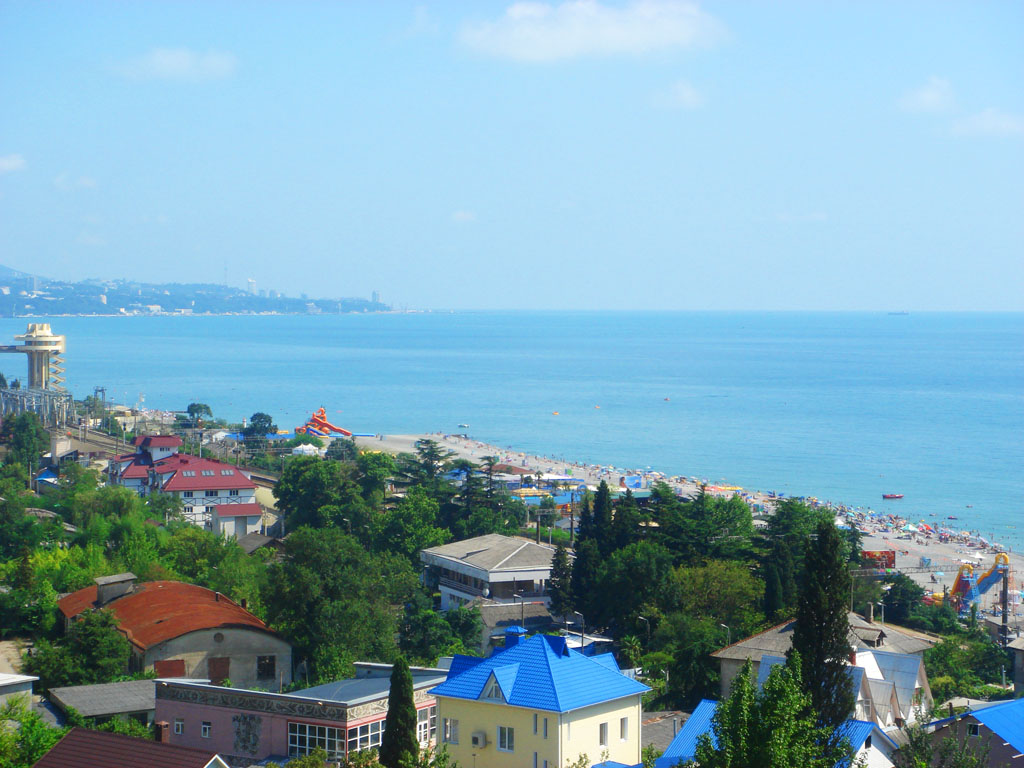
Dagomys beach and Sochi view

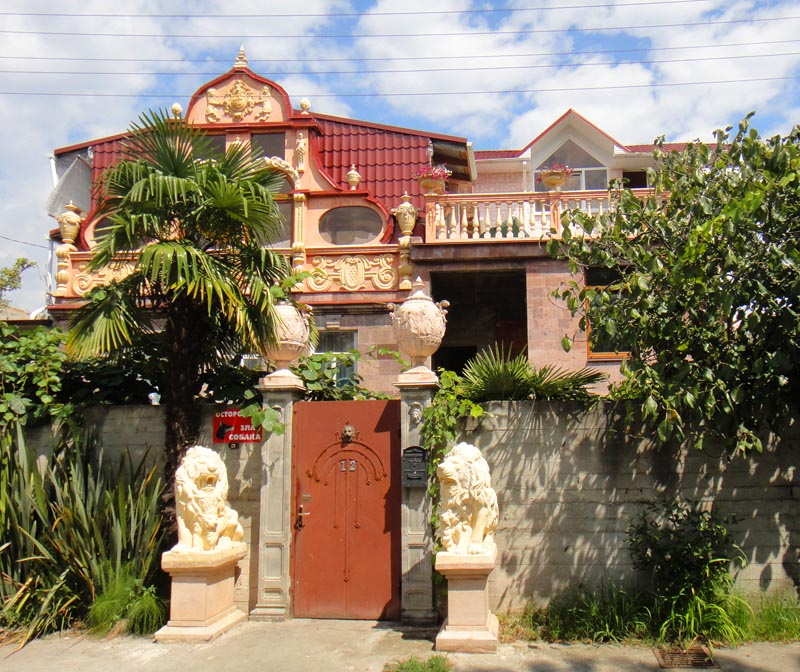
Dagomys - Staroshosseinaya street

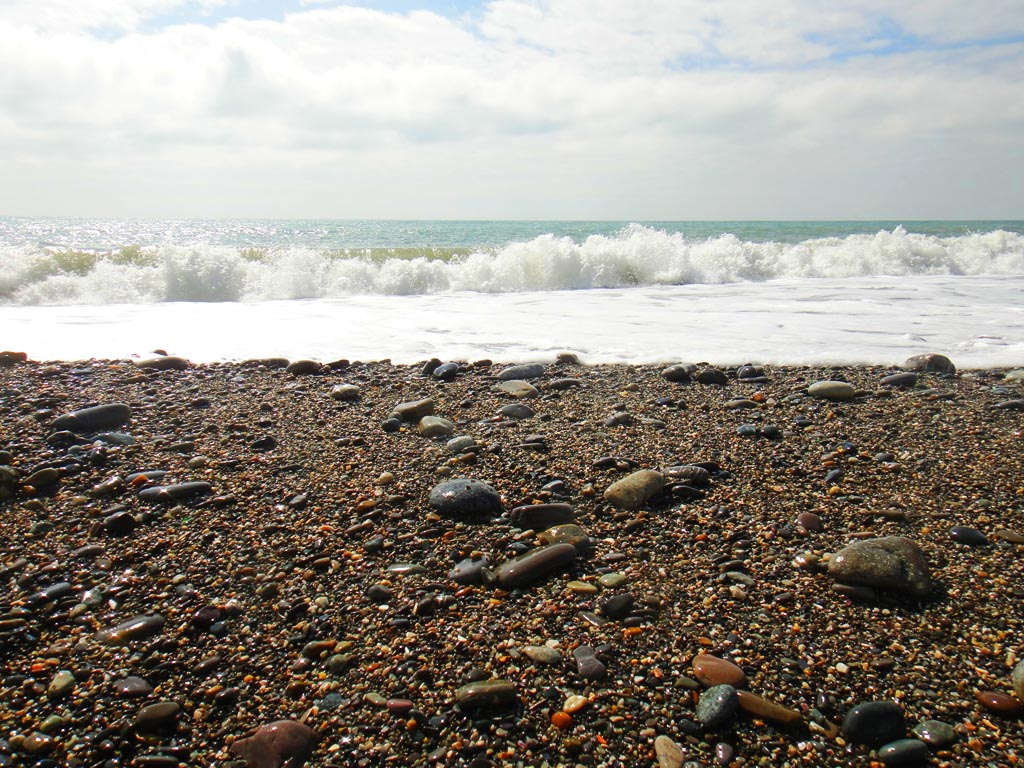
Dagomys beach

Dagomys (Adyghe: Дэгъумес); is a microdistrict of Sochi, Russia (12 km from the city centre), known for its resorts, vacation spots and tea plantations. It was developed as a resort since before the Russian Revolution, when a botanical garden was founded by order of Tsar Nicholas II. A modern hotel complex was opened there in 1982.

Dagomys adjoins Bocharov Ruchey, a dacha built for Kliment Voroshilov in the 1950s, but later upgraded into a country residence of the President of Russia, where he normally spends his vacations and confers with leaders of other states.

== Geography ==
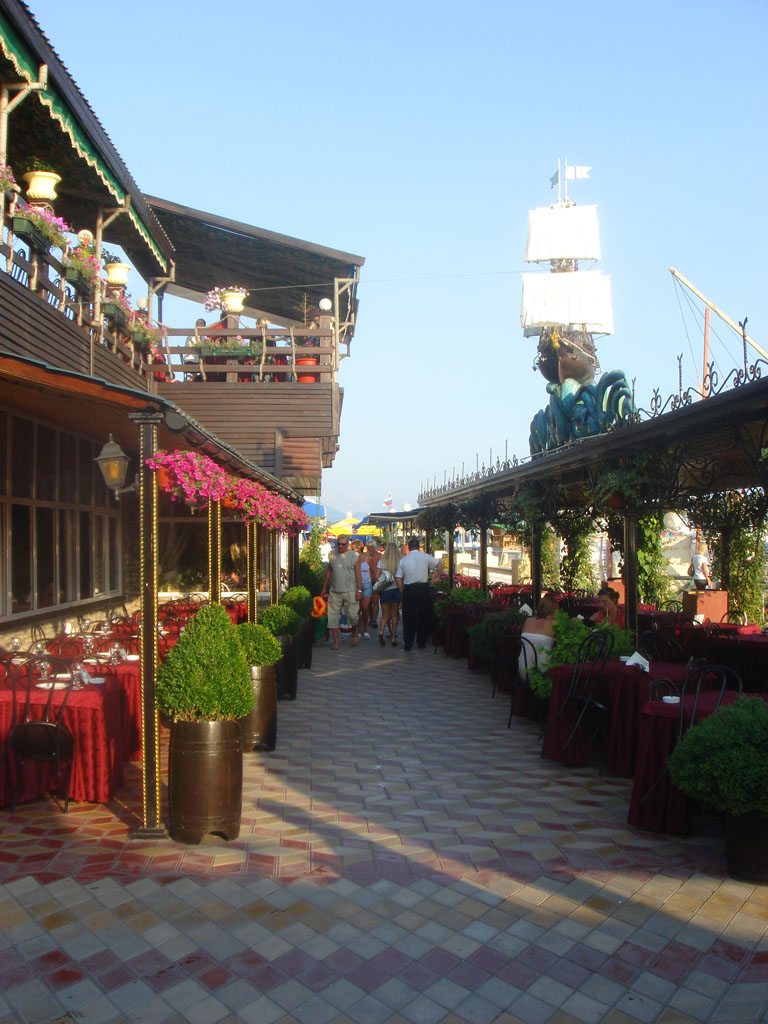
Dagomys embankment

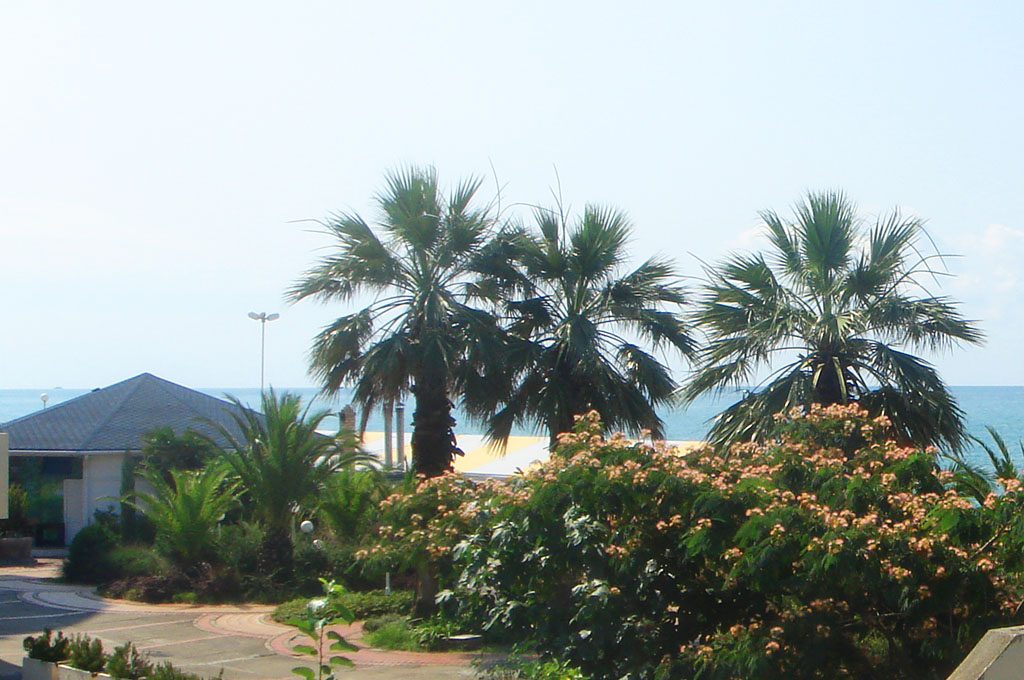
Dagomys embankment

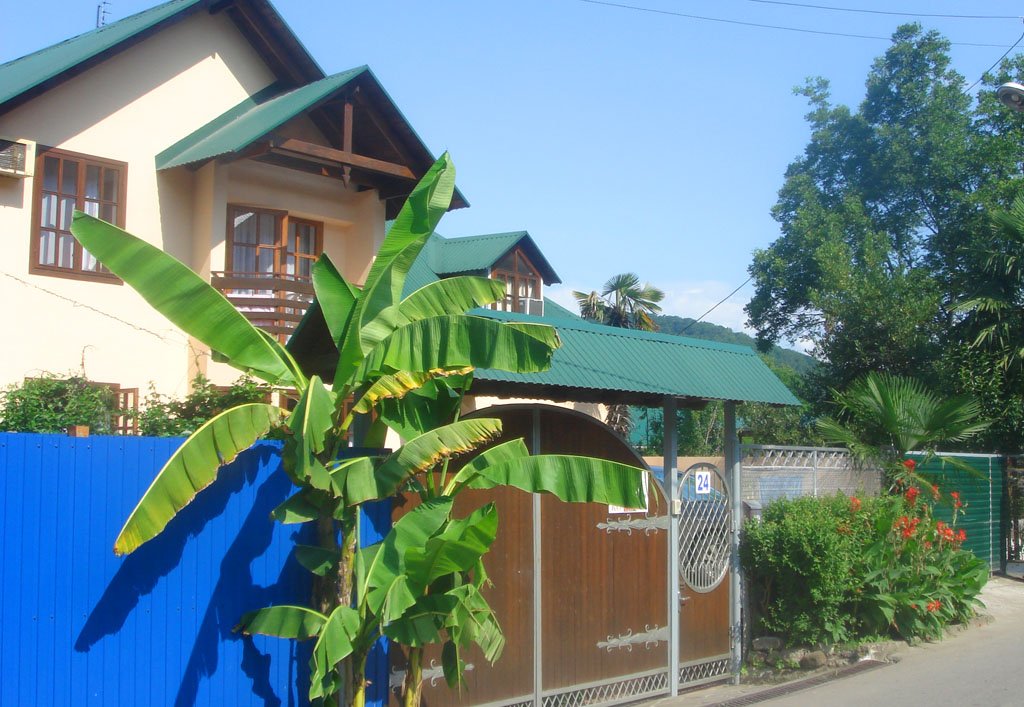
Dagomys - Leningradskaya street

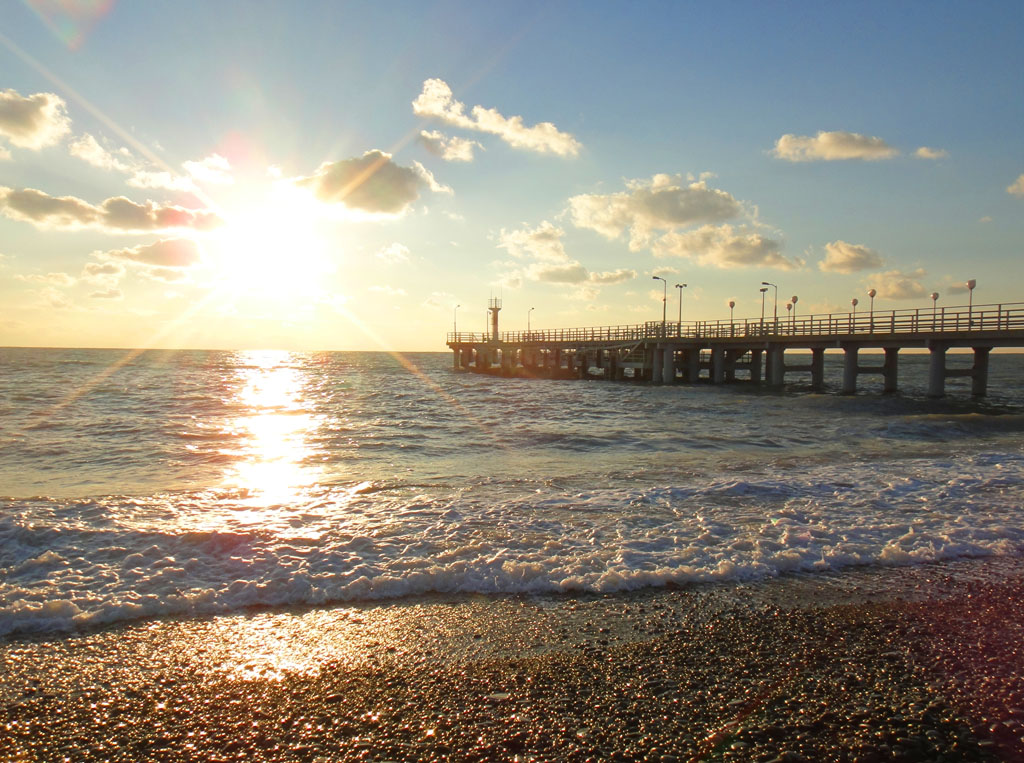
Dagomys sea sunset

Dagomys is located between Sochi and Loo, 12 kilometres (7.5 mi) from the center of Sochi. It was noticed long ago that the summers are colder here than in other coastal areas, because of the air currents from the nearby mountains. So the word "Dagomys" is literally translated from Adyghe language as a cool, shady place.

Present Dagomys has continuous stretch of pebble-covered beaches, accompanied by a line of cafes, shops and restaurants. There are also a tea farm, a tea factory and an Orthodox church.

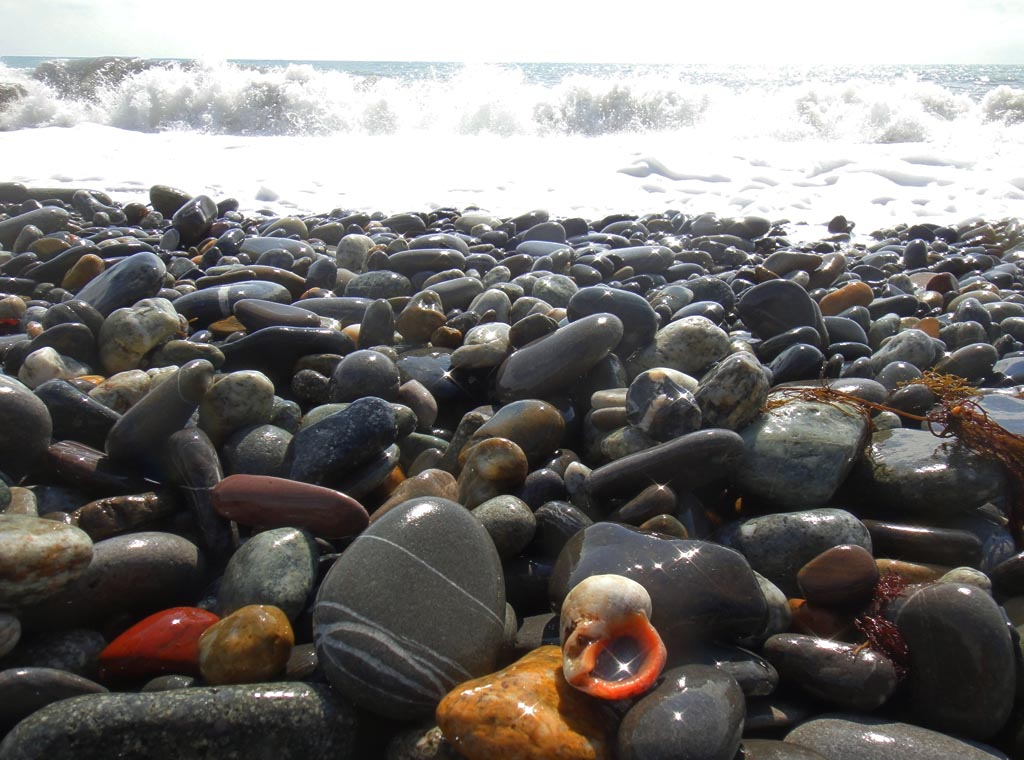
Dagomys - rapana

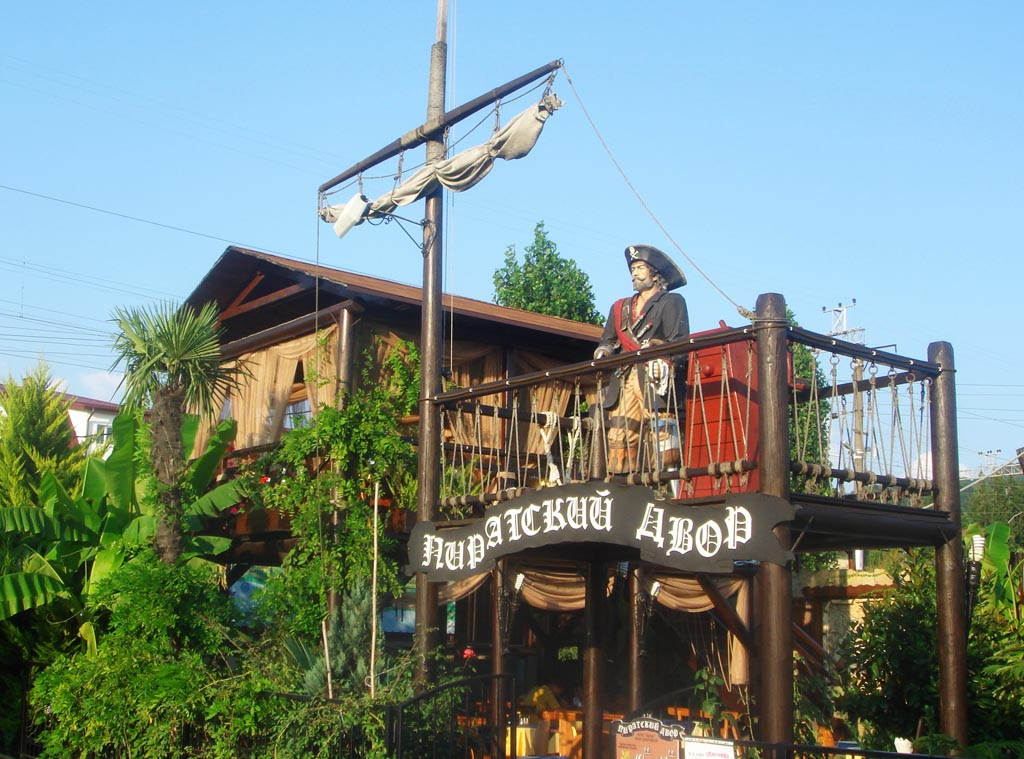
Dagomys pirate restaurant

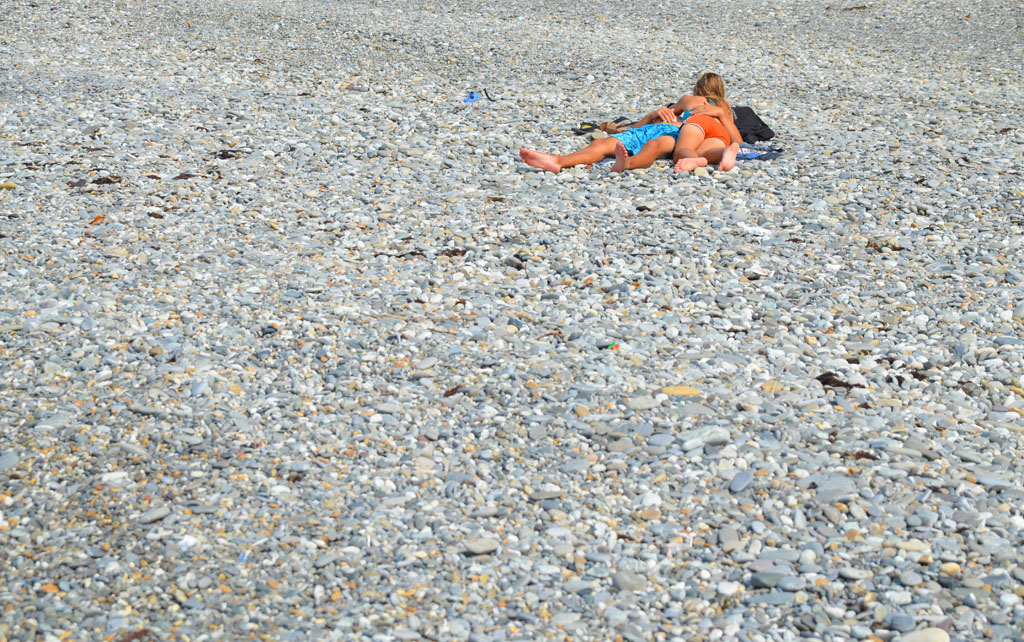
Dagomys beach

== History ==
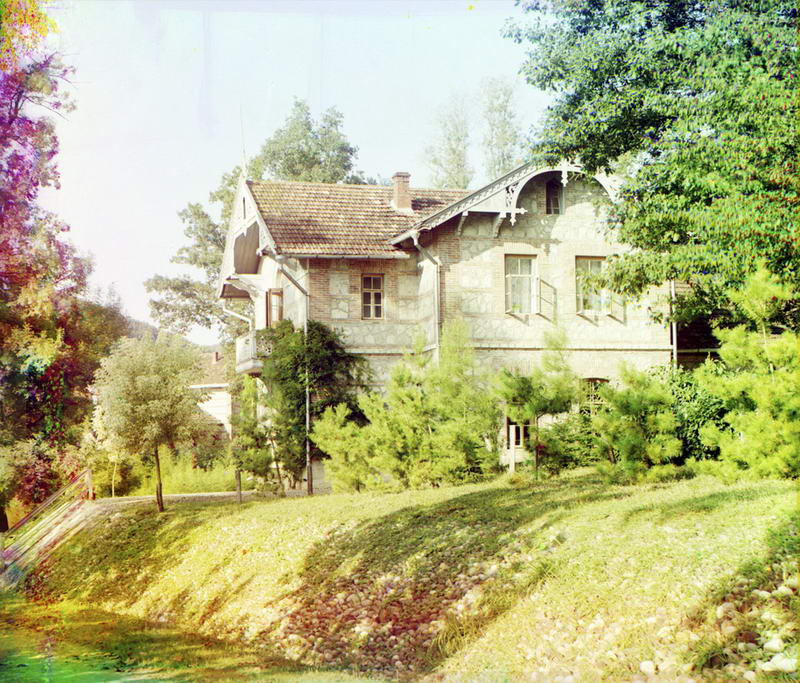
The Tsar's farm

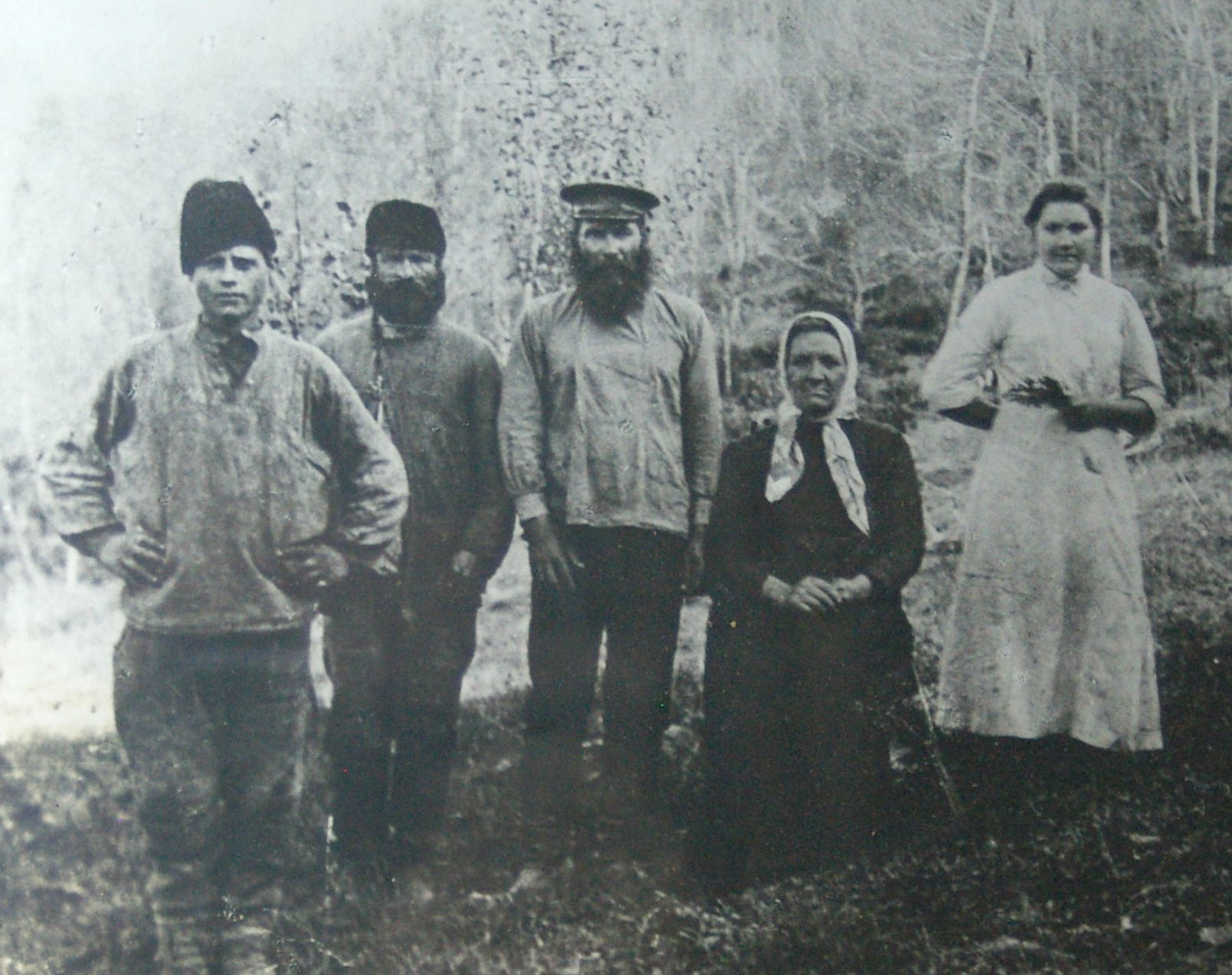
Koshman (middle) with his wife (to the right) and assistants in Solokhaul ca. 1910

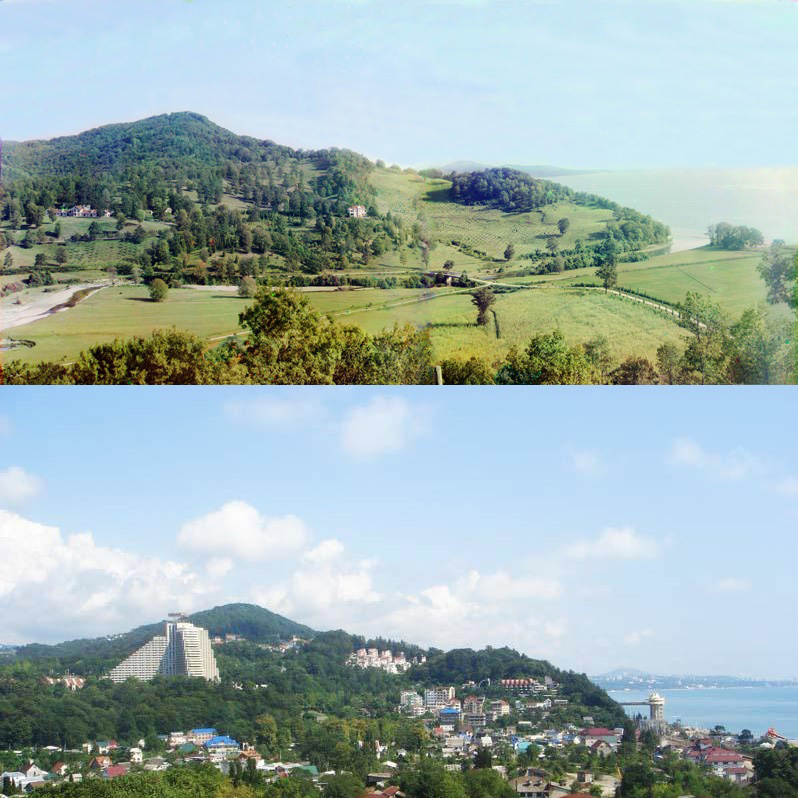
Old (about 1912) and modern Dagomys

The name of microdistrict came from the indigenous and the first dwellers of the area the Circassians or Adyghe they preferred to call their selves. In the 14th-17th centuries, the area was dominated by one of the Adyghe tribes; the Shapsugs, and was a village within historical Circassia. After the end of Caucasian War and as a result of the Russian invasion over Circassia (during the period of 1817–1864) the Shapsugs who lived in the area were either killed in the Circassian genocide or expelled to the Ottoman Empire (see Muhajir).

Russian settlements in the area began with a military outpost, which later grew into several villages. Those villages were first populated by the retired soldiers and thus carried the names of the corresponding military units, such as 1st regiment, 2nd regiment, and so forth. The soldiers were then joined by migrants from all over Russia, as well as by Armenians escaping from the Turkish repressions. Armenians built separate villages in the mountains near Dagomys and named them Nor Luys, Lower Armenian Hobzu, Upper-Armenian Loo, etc.

The most valuable land near the sea was purchased by the government officials, ministers, prominent landowners and bankers. A plot of 2,500 hectares and a cattle-breeding farm at the mouth of the river Dagomys was owned by the family of the Emperor Nicholas II of Russia. The associated peasants lived in a small settlement which later became the modern Dagomys. Only about 300 people lived there in the early 20th century. This royal settlement was managed by Prince Uspensky. The farm was profitable as it was selling part of its production at the market of Sochi, and the citizens considered it an honor to buy Emperor's products; a small part was also delivered to the emperor himself.

Some settlers attempted to grow tea, which was then an expensive, yet the most popular non-alcoholic beverage in Russia. The early attempts in the 1870s and 1880s failed because of the cold climate, and the first success was achieved in the early 1900s by the Ukrainian peasant Judas Antonovich Koshman (1838–1935). Koshman previously worked for a tea factory in Adjara, a place south to Sochi on the Black Sea coast. That tea was known in Russia but its taste was unpopular. In 1901, Koshman brought seeds of tea plants from Adjara to Solokhaul – a village near Dagomys – and developed a brand which was not only resistant to cold but also had a rich taste. The first successful plantation is dated to 1905. This new tea later became the distinct brand of Krasnodarsky Tea, which is the most prominent Russia-grown tea and is one of the northernmost teas in the world. The house of Koshman still stands in Solokhaul along with the tea bushes planted by his hands.

In 1930, an intensive development of resorts was started in Sochi, and thus a furniture factory was built in Dagomys. There were also two tourist camps and several small sanatoriums. Prominent buildings appeared there only in the 1970s when the Yugoslav firm "Mavrovo" raised two hotels, "Dagomys" and "Olympic". These hotels soon became a popular tourist destination and location of conferences, such as the 38th Pugwash Conferences on Science and World Affairs led by Andrei Sakharov.

== The Dagomys Hotel Complex ==
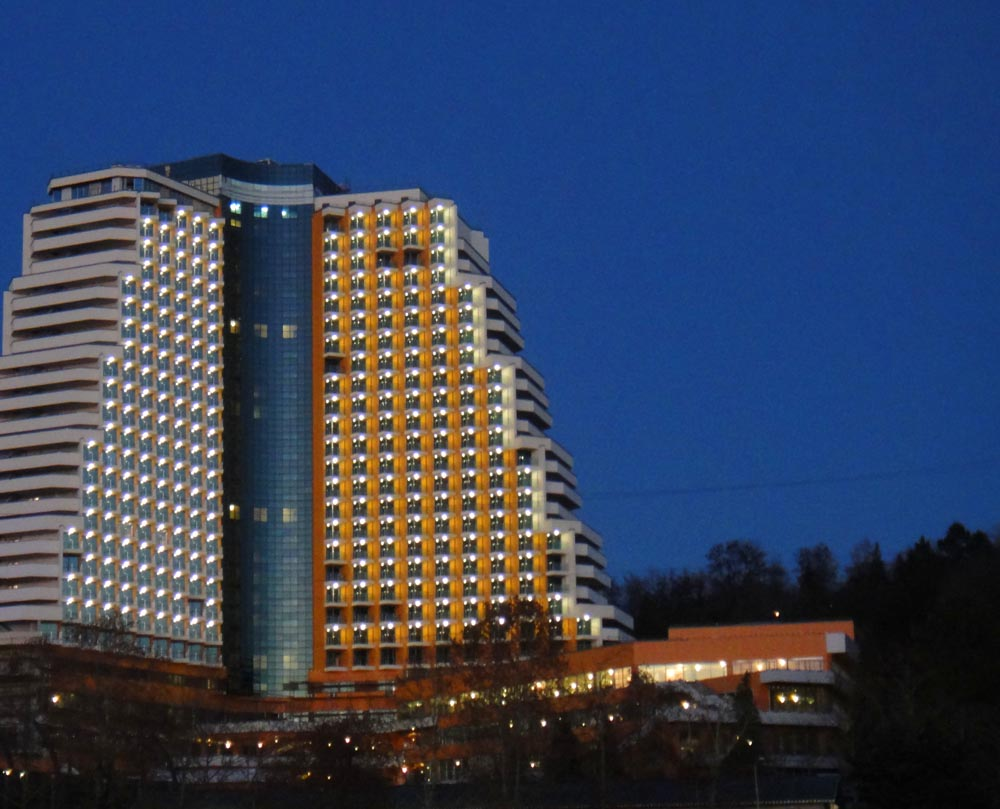
The Dagomys Hotel under reconstruction (Jan 2013)

This 27-storey recreational complex is the most prominent building of Dagomys raised in 1982. It then belonged to the Intourist travel agency and thus was restricted to foreign visitors. With the dissolution of the Soviet Union in the 1990s, the complex became nearly empty. Since 1994, Dagomys has been administered by an office of the President of the Russian Federation, and the complex is privately owned. For several years, it was the subject of property disputes, which ended by construction of a metal fence dividing the territories of the disputants.

The complex can accommodate up to two thousand guests and up to ten parallel events, and has a staff of 1600. It is being expanded in preparation for the 2014 Winter Olympics.

== Gallery ==
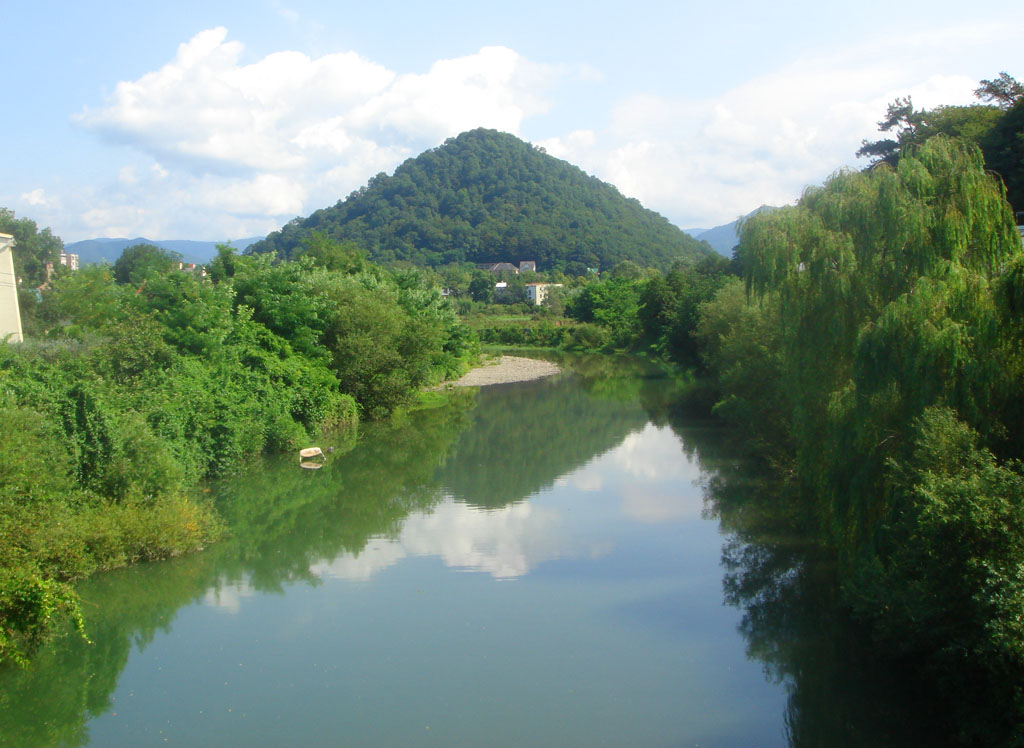
Dagomys river

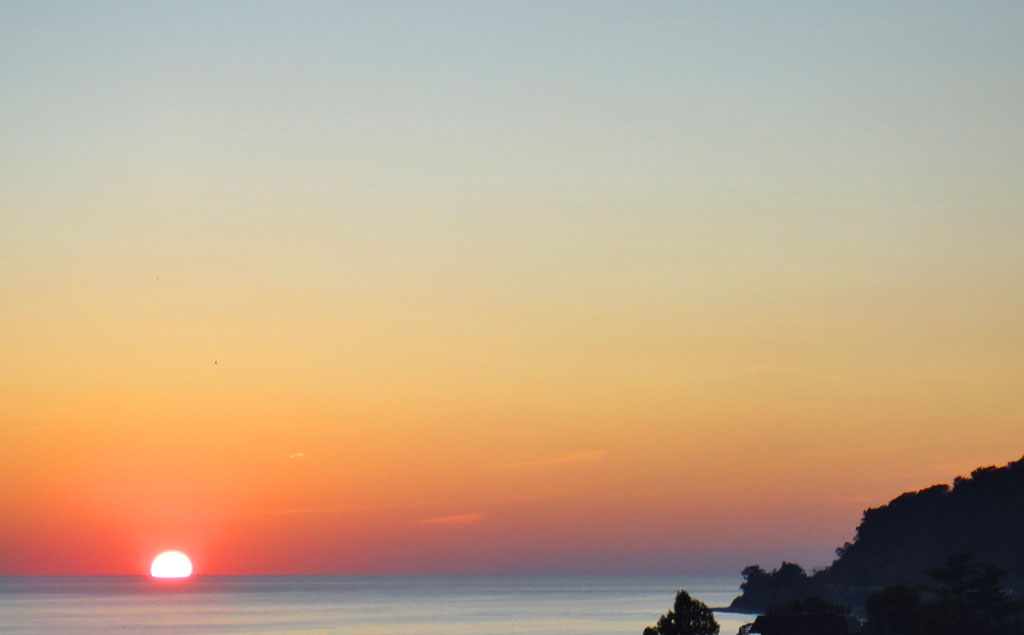
Dagomys sunset

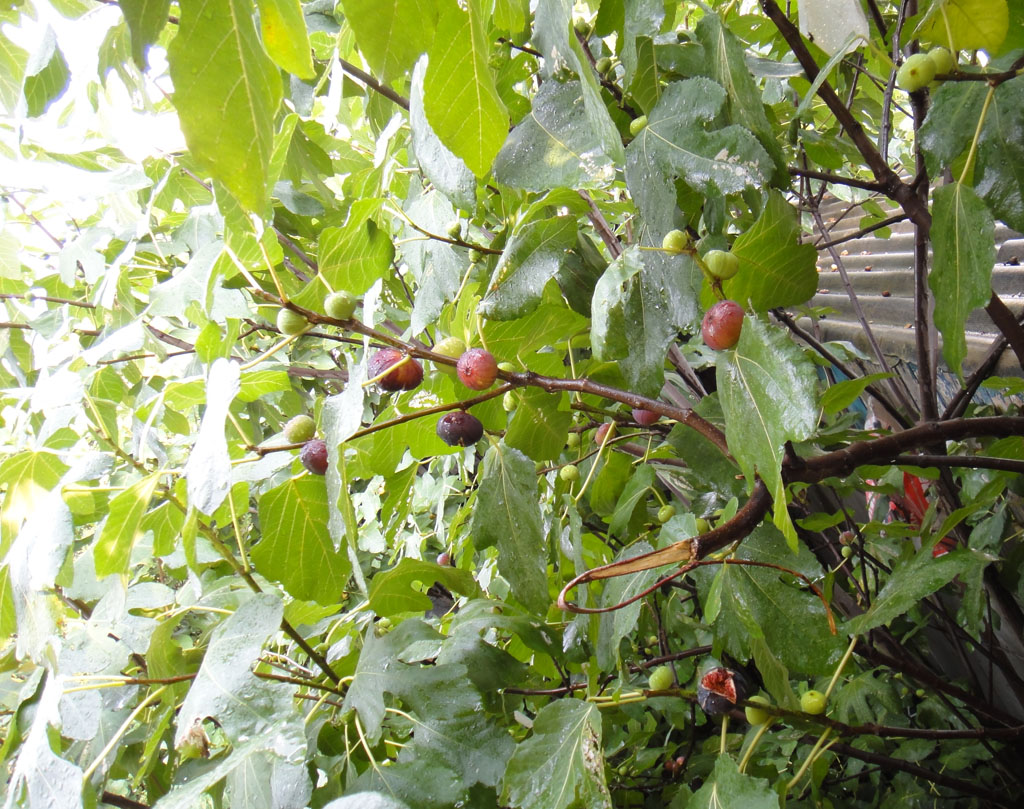
Dagomys - fig tree

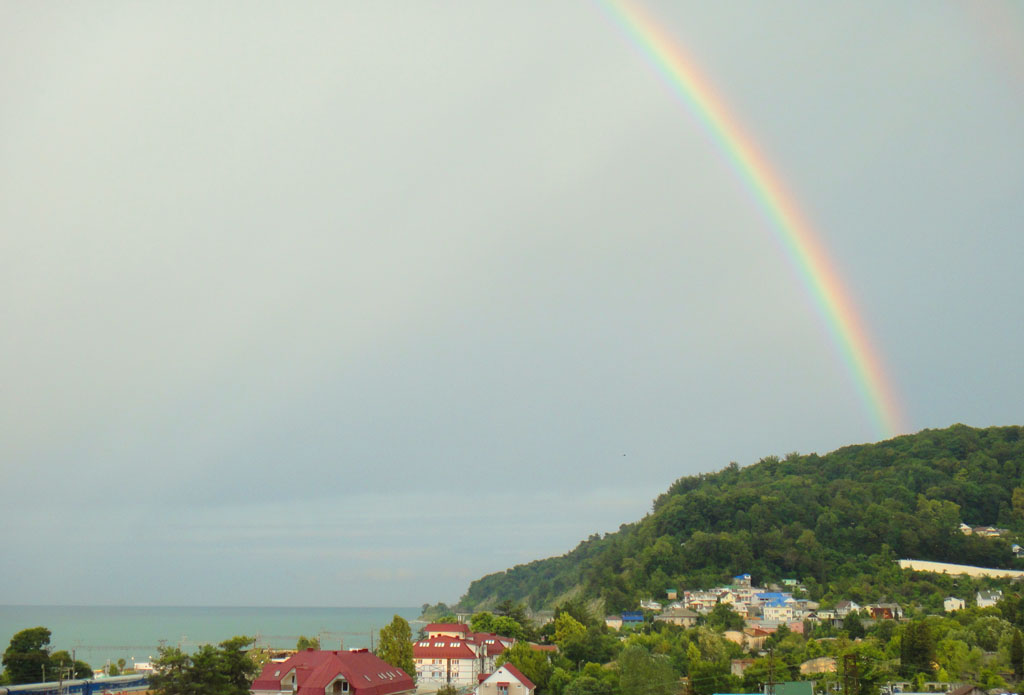
Dagomys rainbow

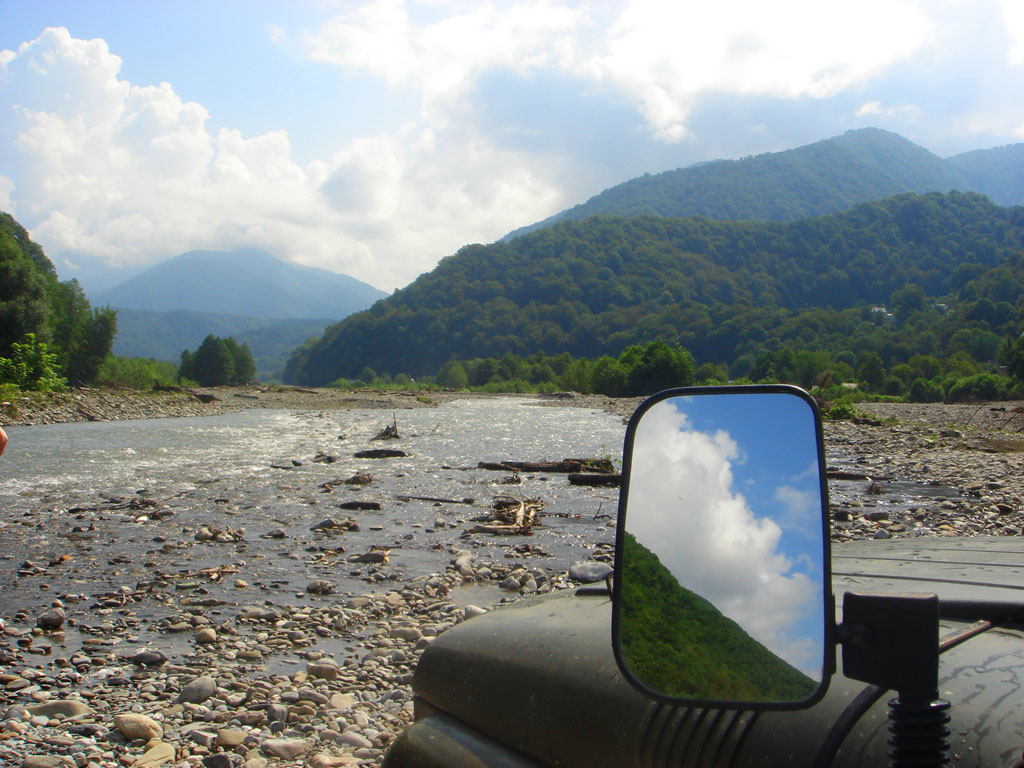
Dagomys mountain jeeping

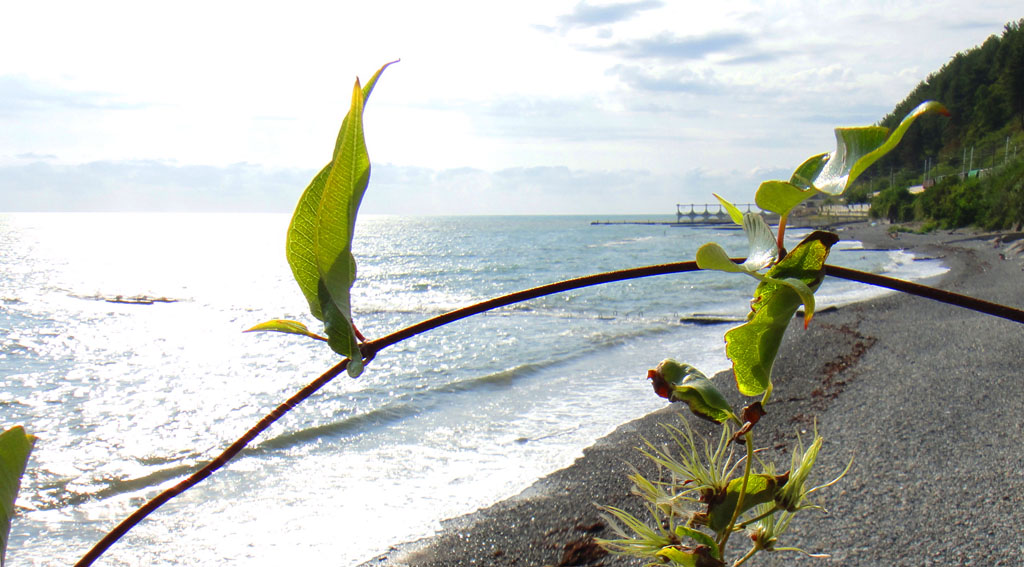
Dagomys beach

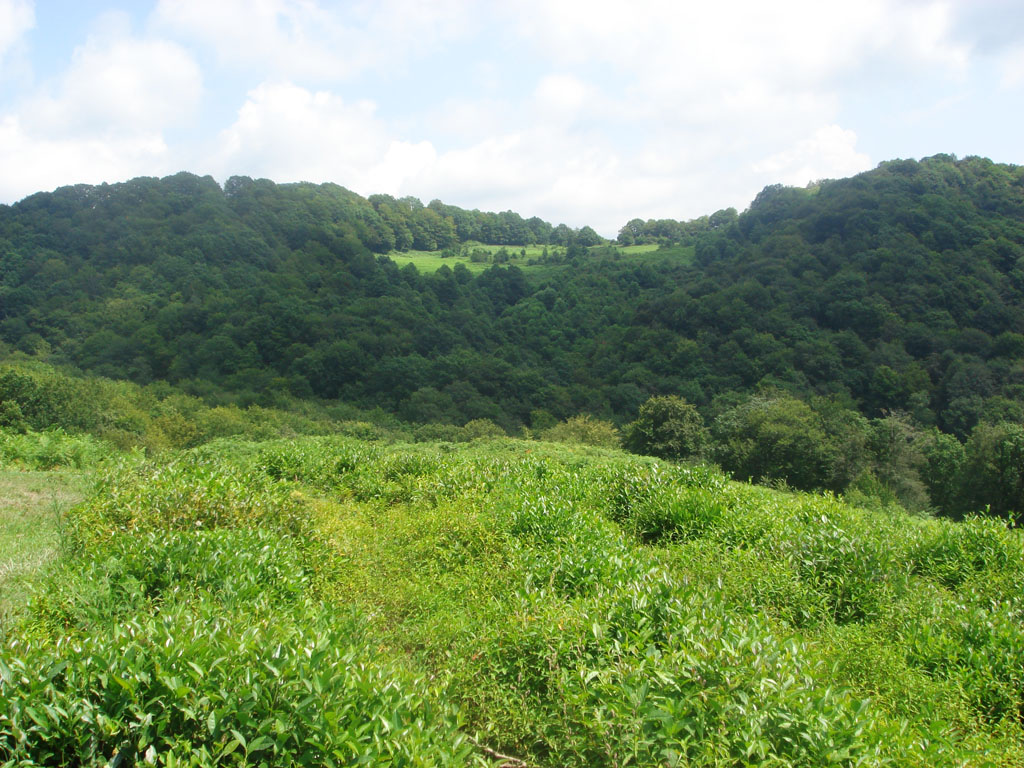
Dagomys mountain tea

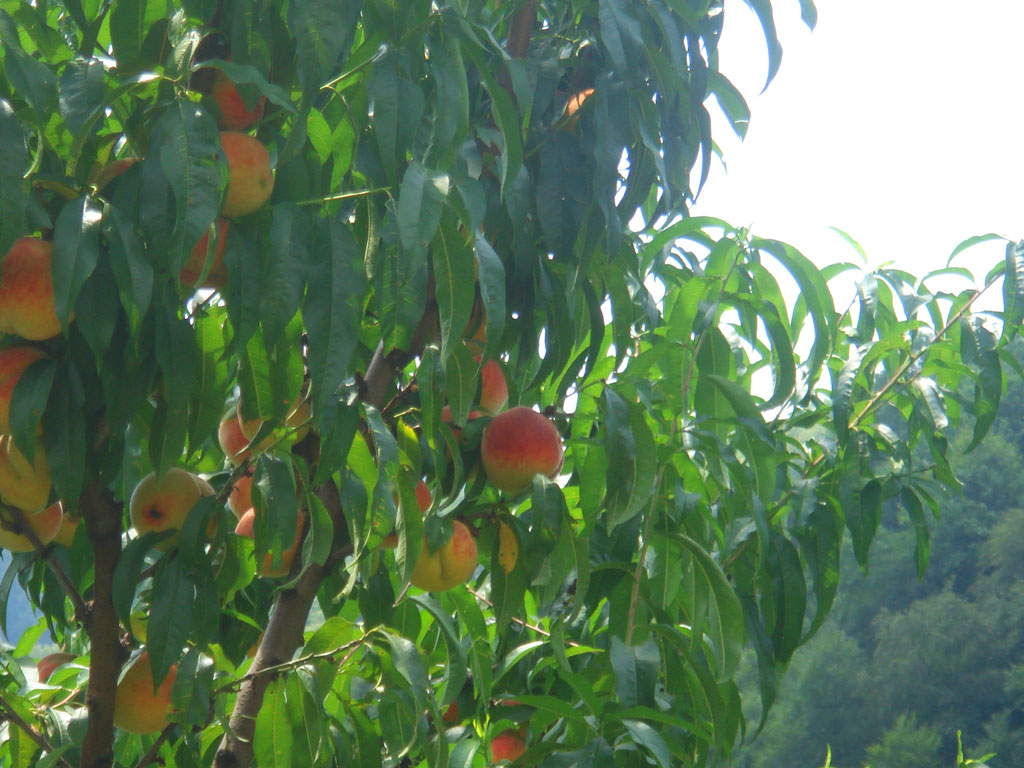
Dagomys peach tree

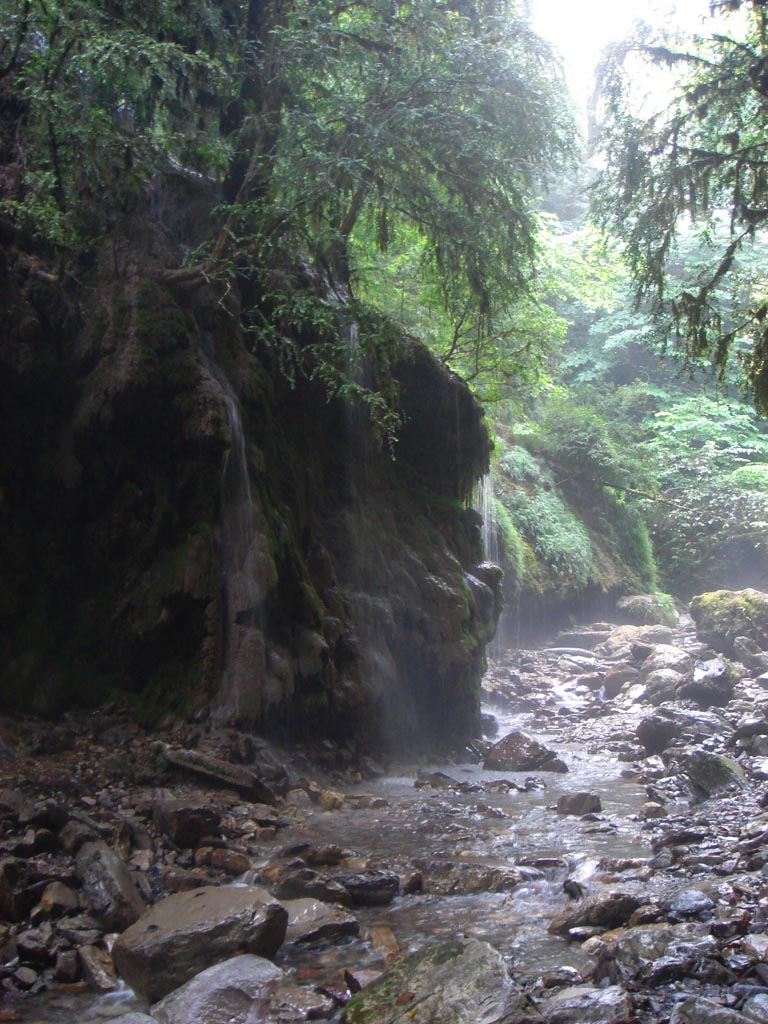
Dagomys mountain brook

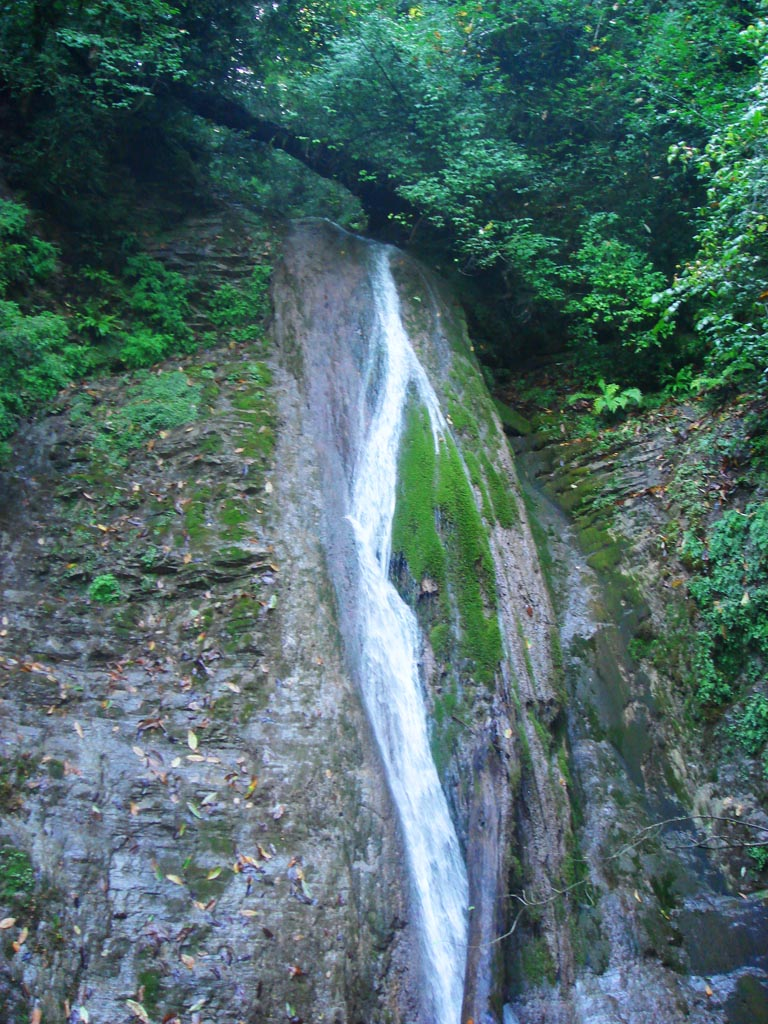
Dagomys forest waterfall

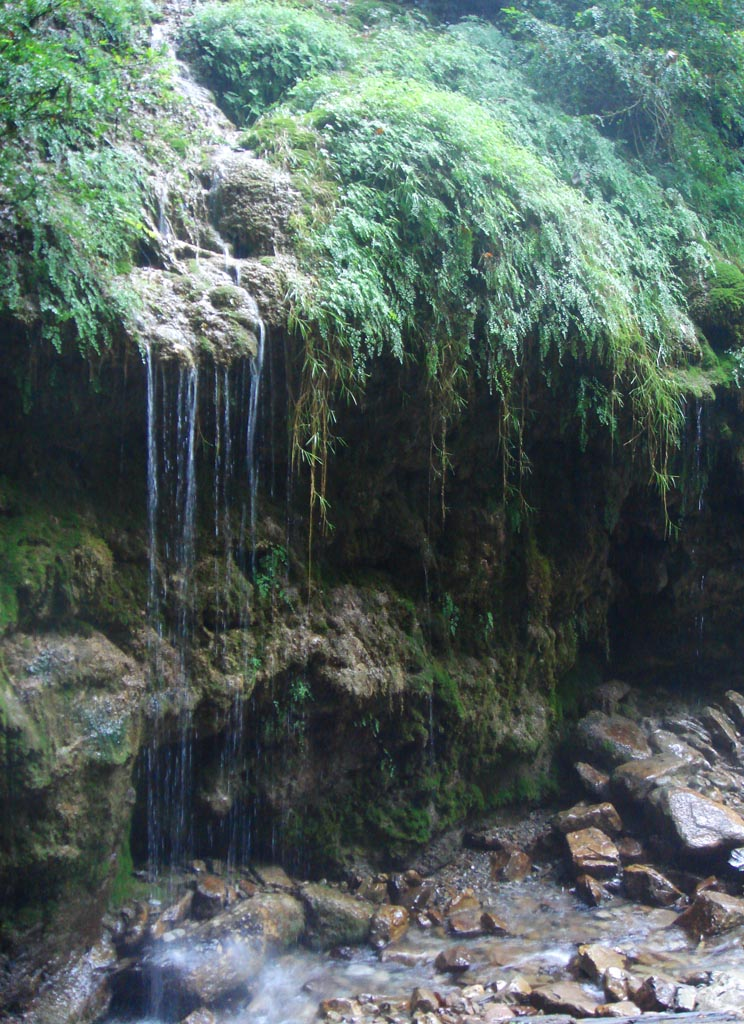
Dagomys mountain river

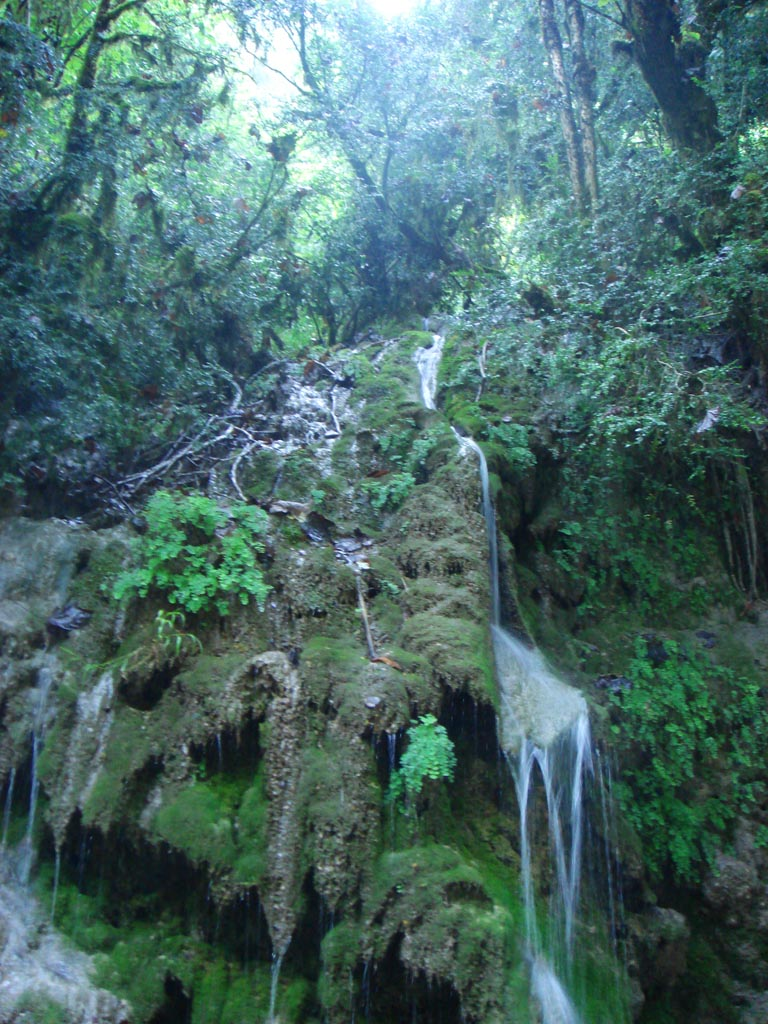
Dagomys forest

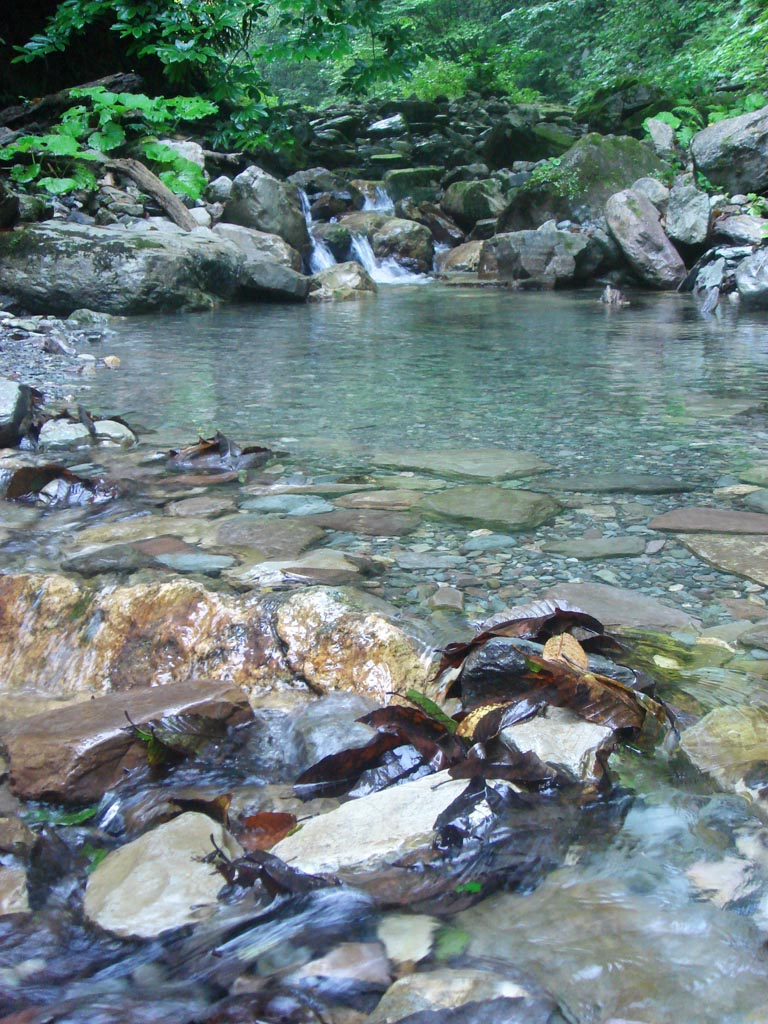
Eastern Dagomys mountain river

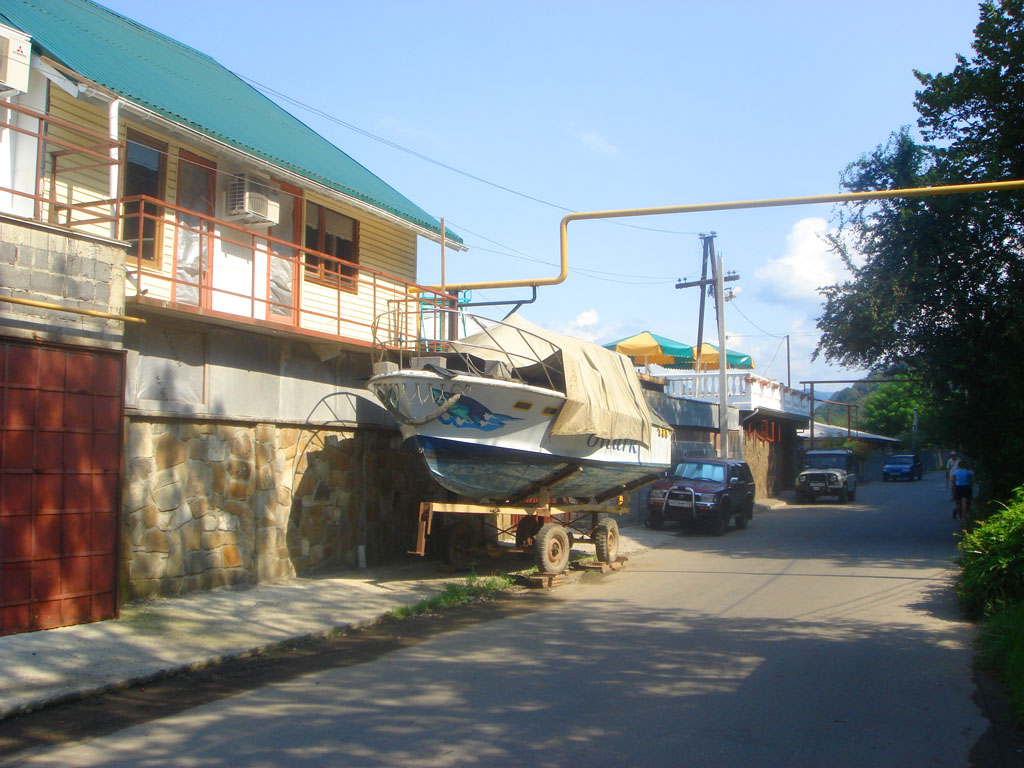
Dagomys - Leningradskaya street

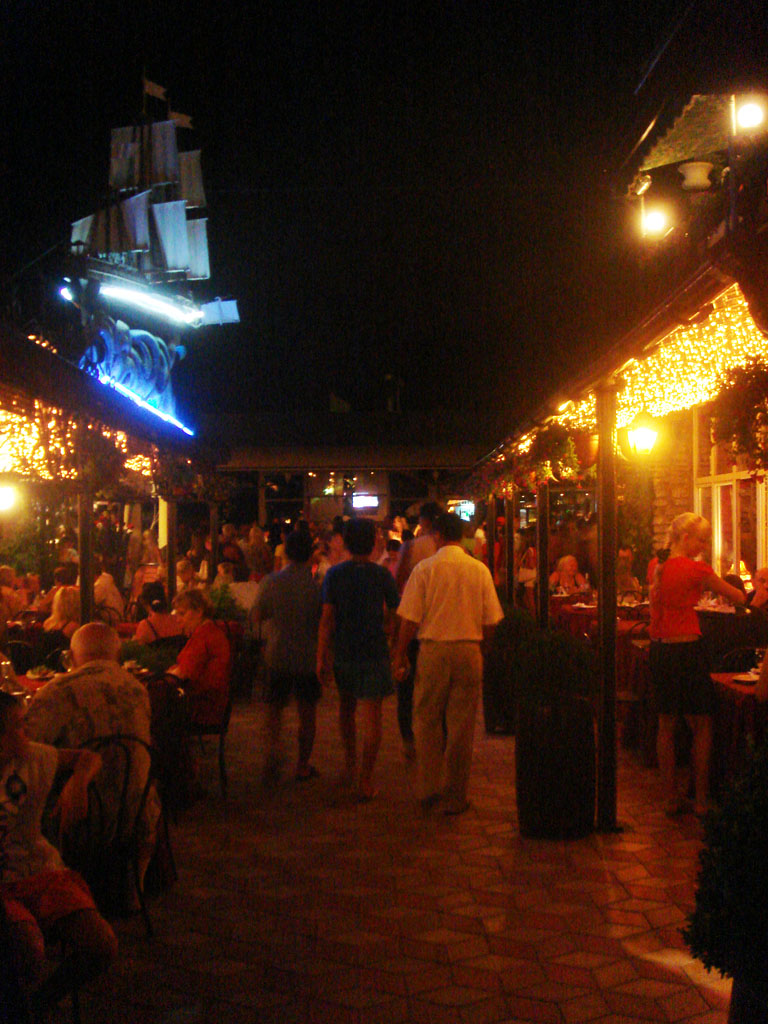
Dagomys around the midnight

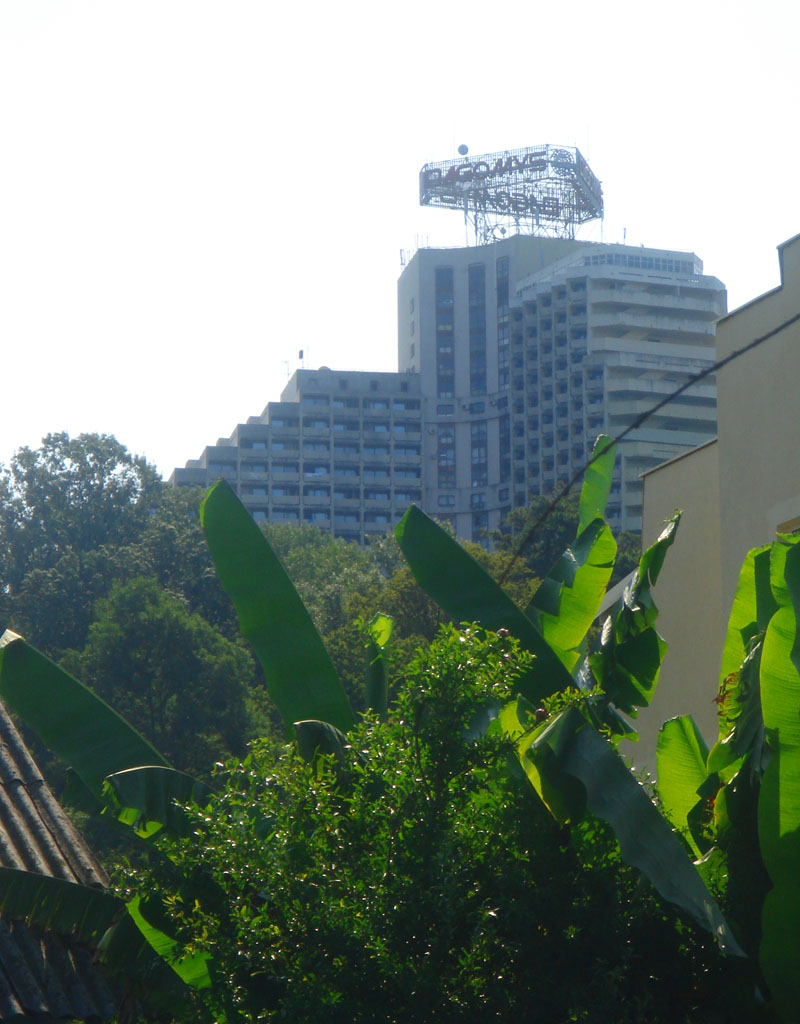
Dagomys - banana

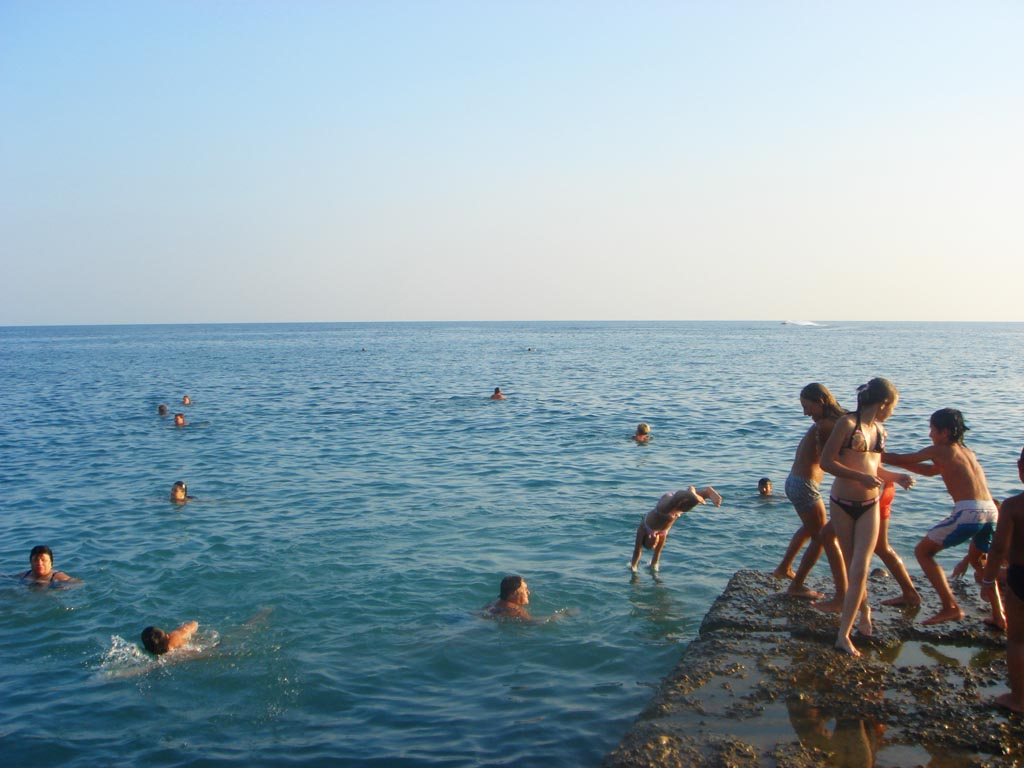
Dagomys - children

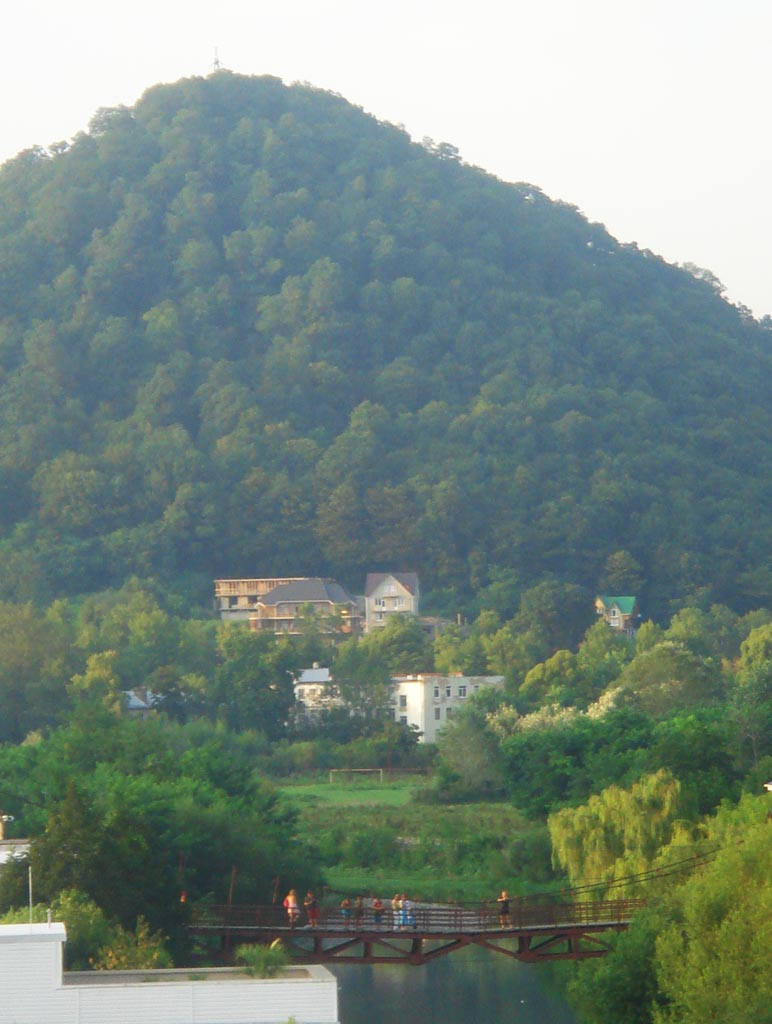
Dagomys river bridge

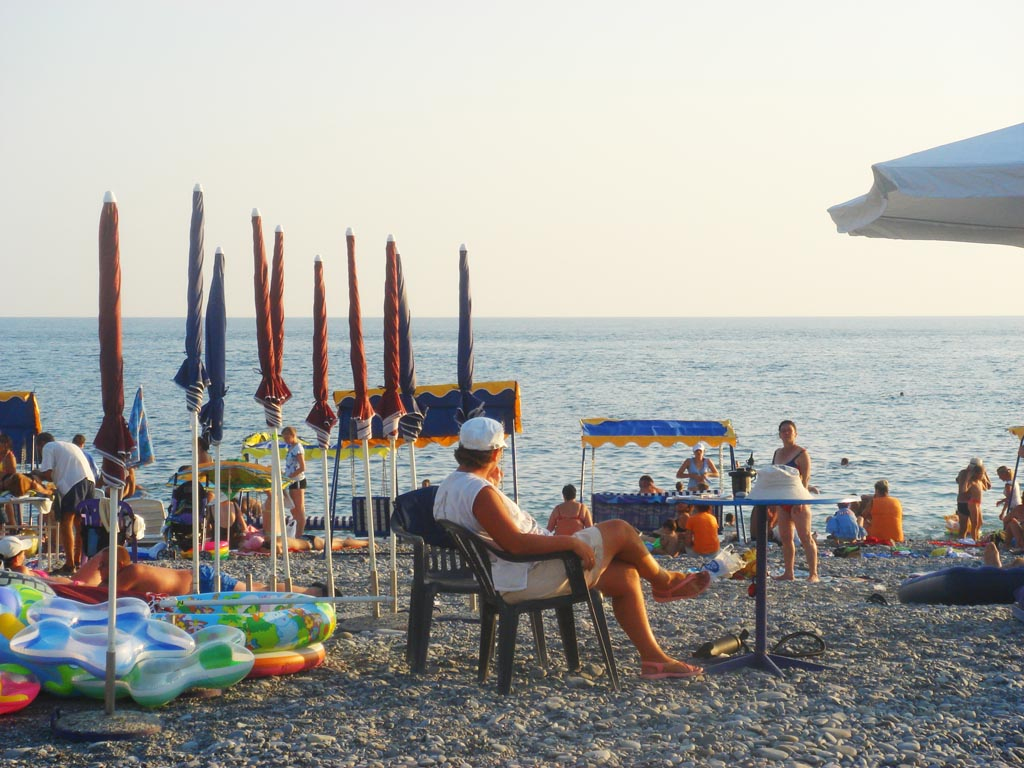
Dagomys central beach

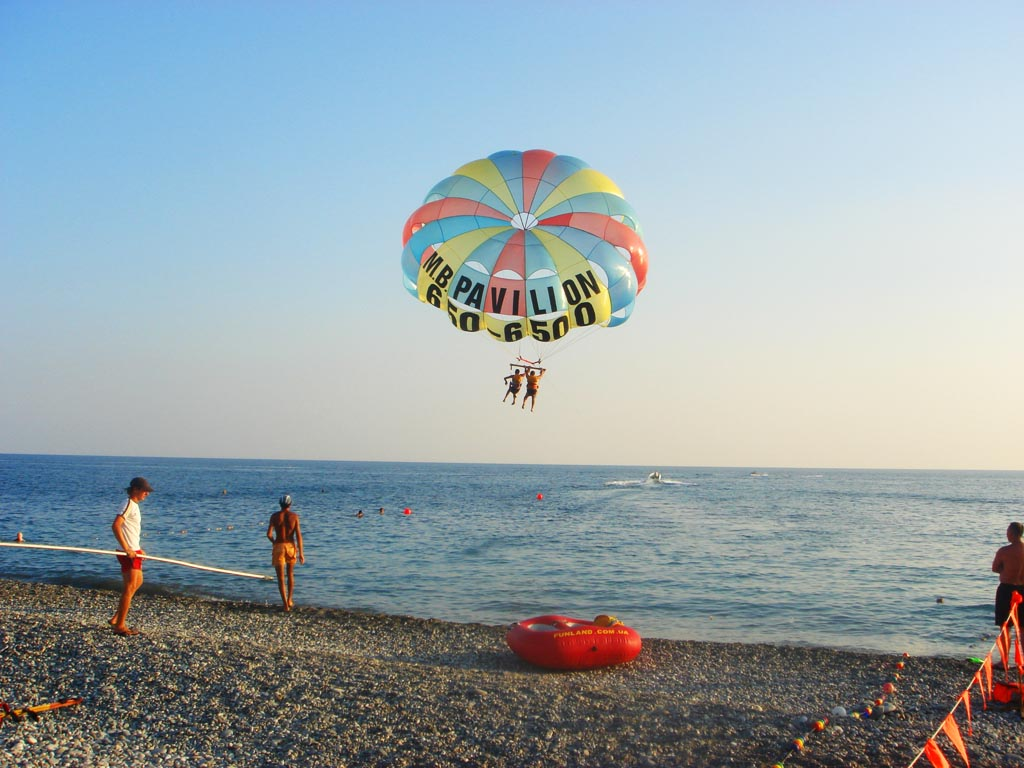
Dagomys parachute flying

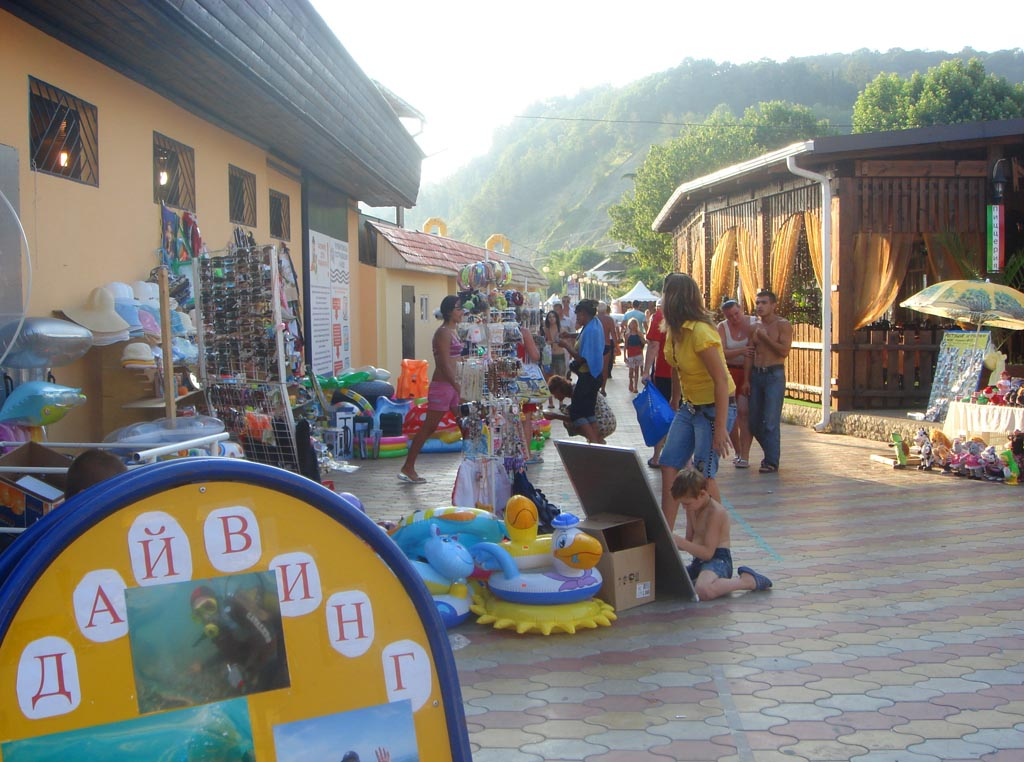
Dagomys near "Lastochka" cafe

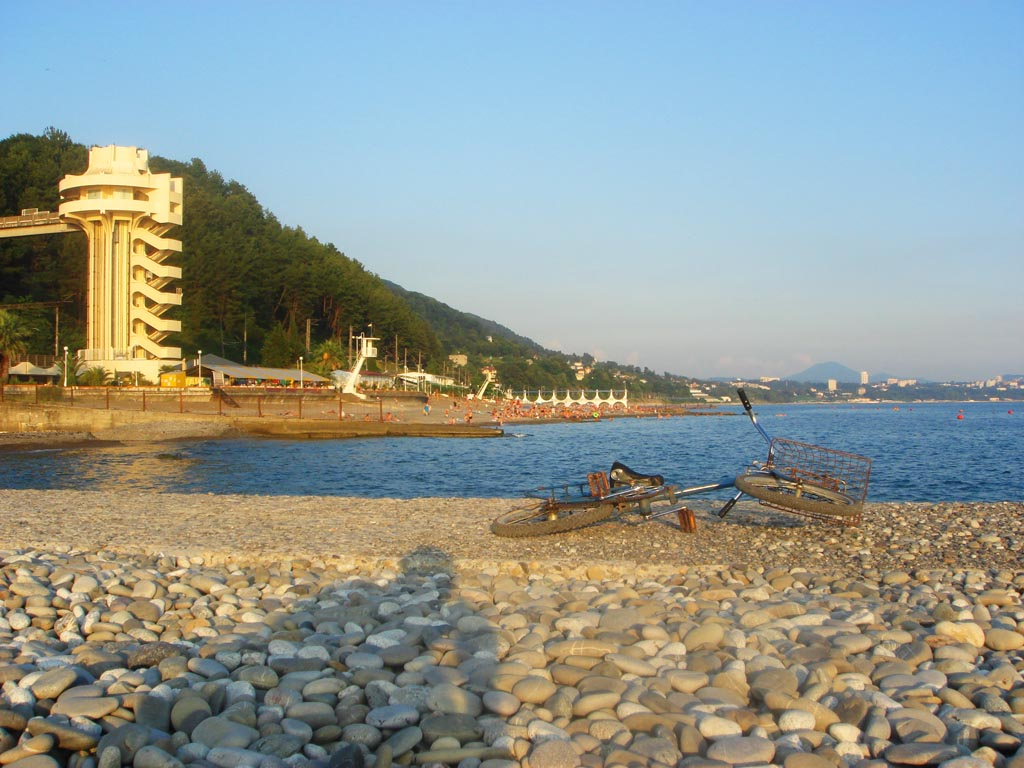
Dagomys eastern beach

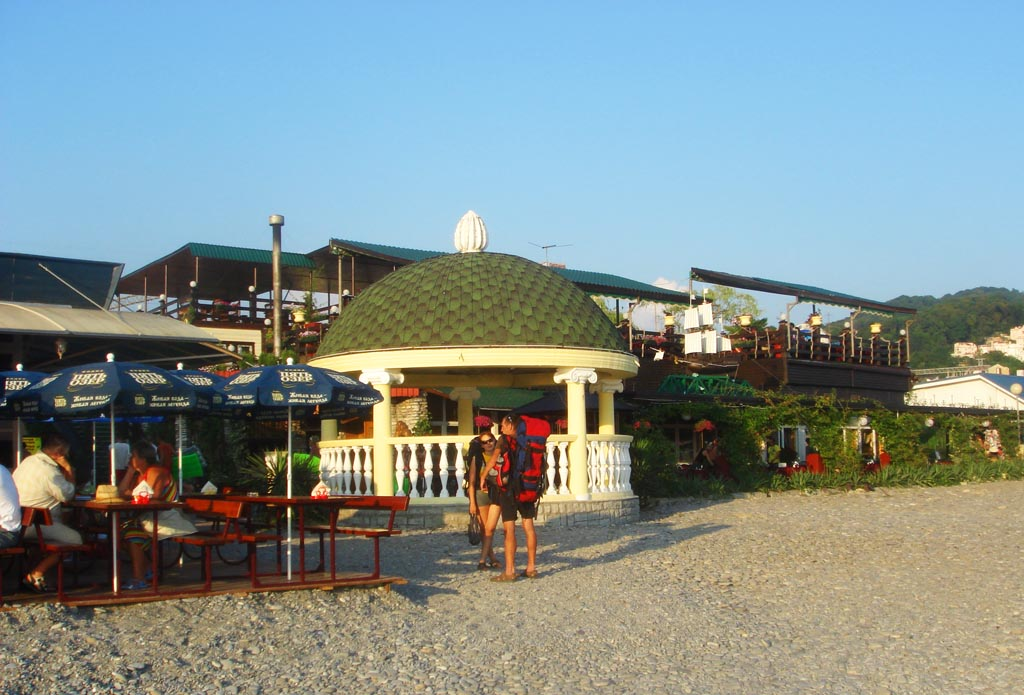
Dagomys, Sochi

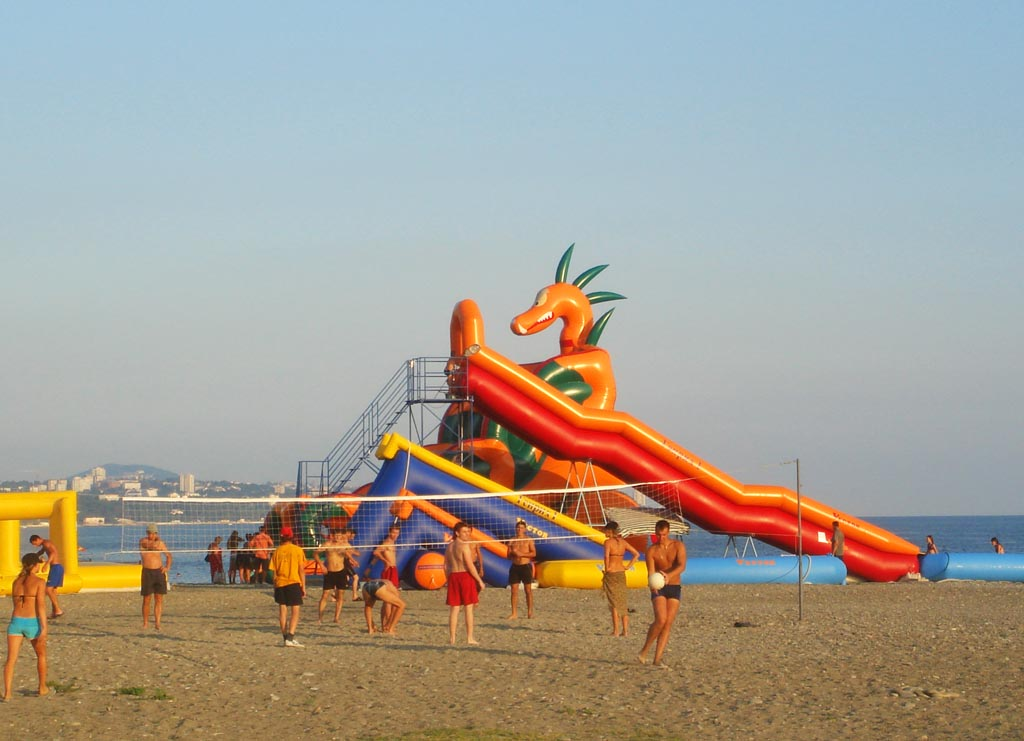
Dagomys, Sochi
