= Lazarevskoye Microdistrict =

Microdistrict of Sochi, Krasnodar Krai, Russia

Coordinates: 43°54′40″N 39°20′17″E

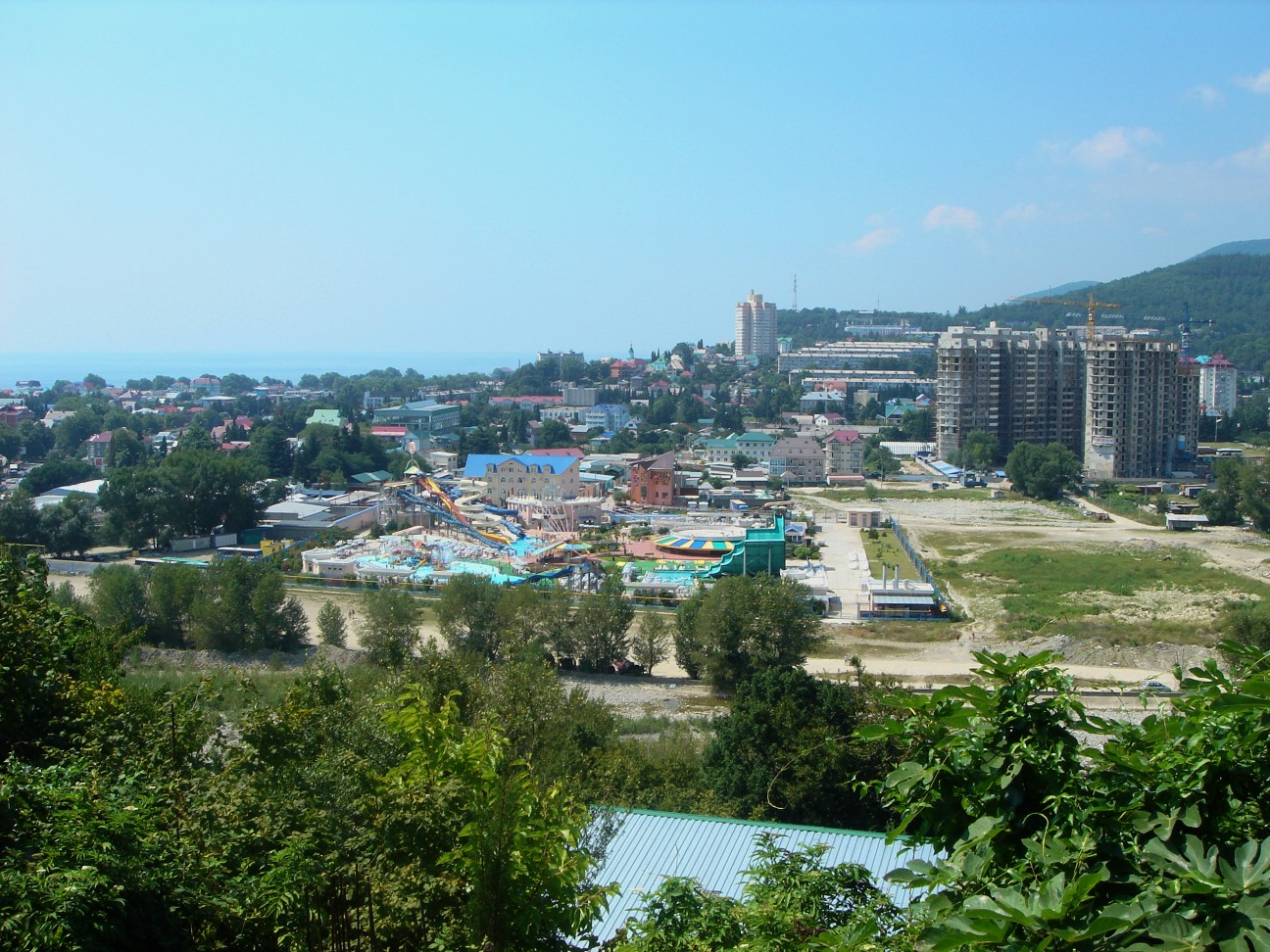
View of Lazarevskoye from a mountain

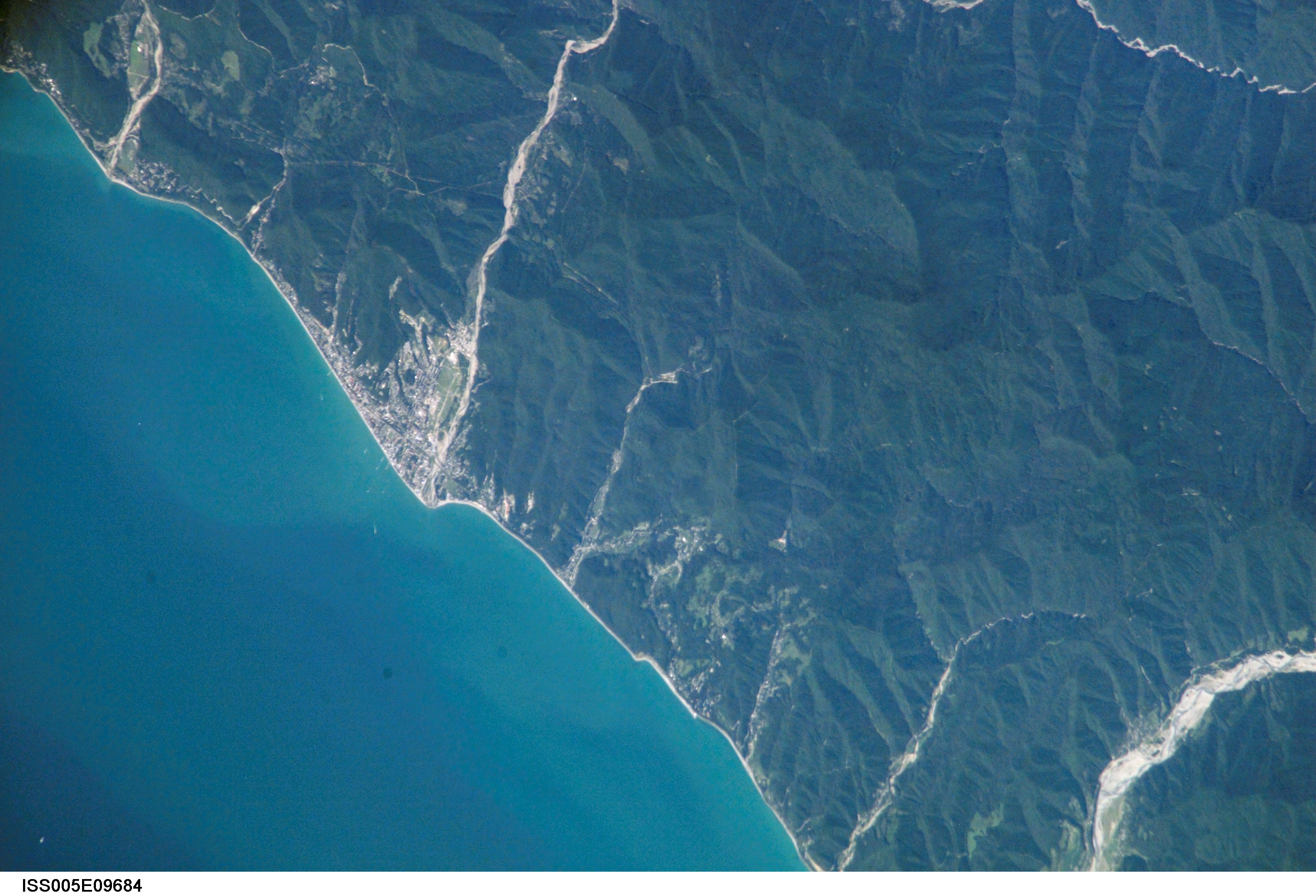
View from space

Lazarevskoye (Russian: Ла́заревское; Adyghe: Псышӏуап Adyghe pronunciation: [psəʃʷʼaːp]) is a microdistrict of Lazarevsky City District of the city of Sochi, Krasnodar Krai, Russia. It was a resort settlement before 1961, when it was merged into Sochi.

== Geography ==
The microdistrict is located on the shore of the Black Sea at the mouth of the Psezuapse River.

== History ==
It was founded in 1869 as the village of Lazarevka in place of the former Lazarevskoye Fortress, which existed in 1839–1854. The fortress was named after Admiral Mikhail Lazarev. Later the name of the village was changed to Lazarevskoye. On July 12, 1949, it was granted resort settlement status. On February 11, 1961, it was merged into the city of Sochi and ceased to exist as an independent entity.

== Others ==
Lazarevskaya railway station on the Tuapse-Adler line is located on the territory of the microdistrict. There are two waterparks and a dolphinarium.
