= Dagomys (river) =

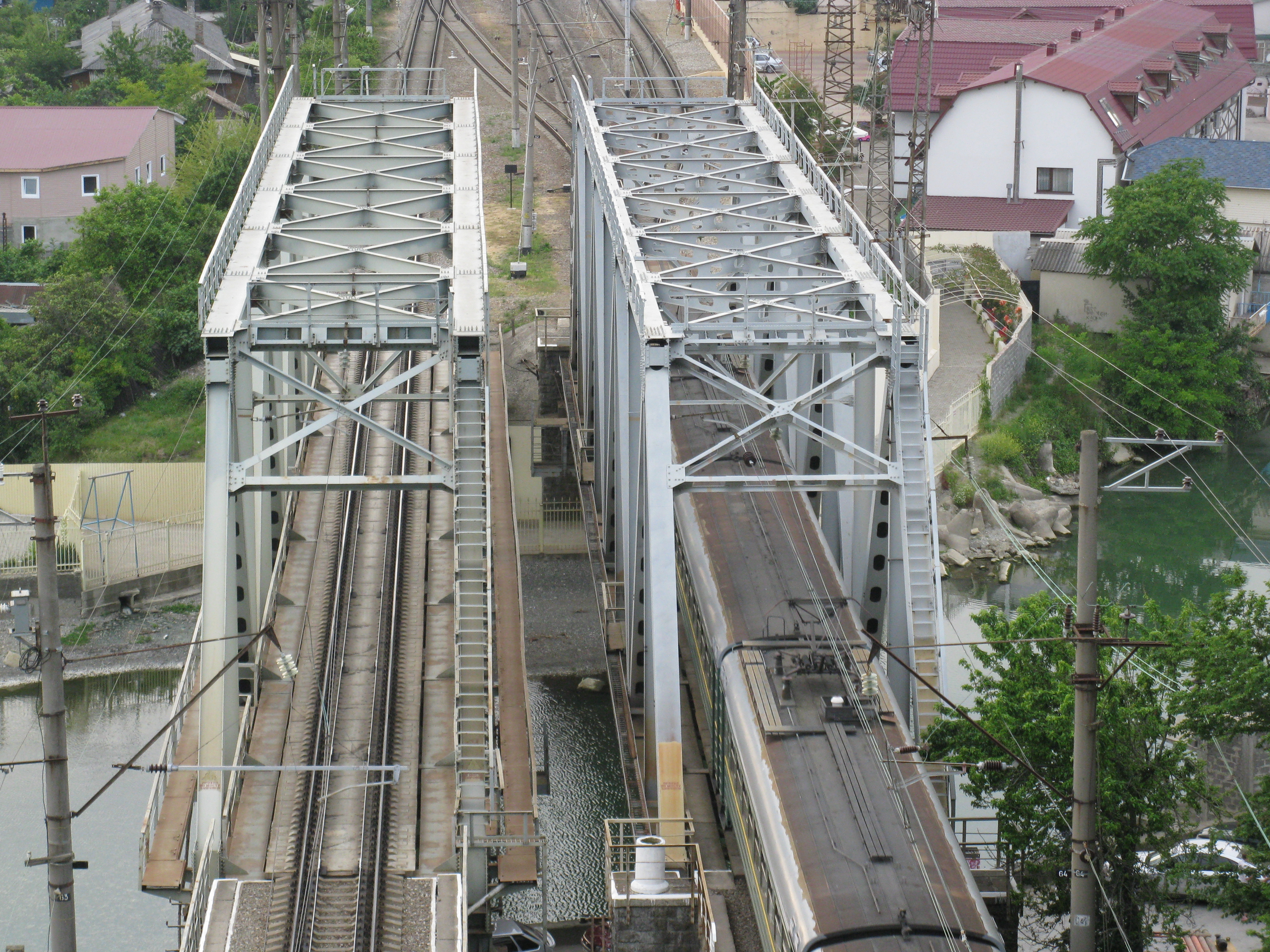
- Rail bridge crossing the Dagomys

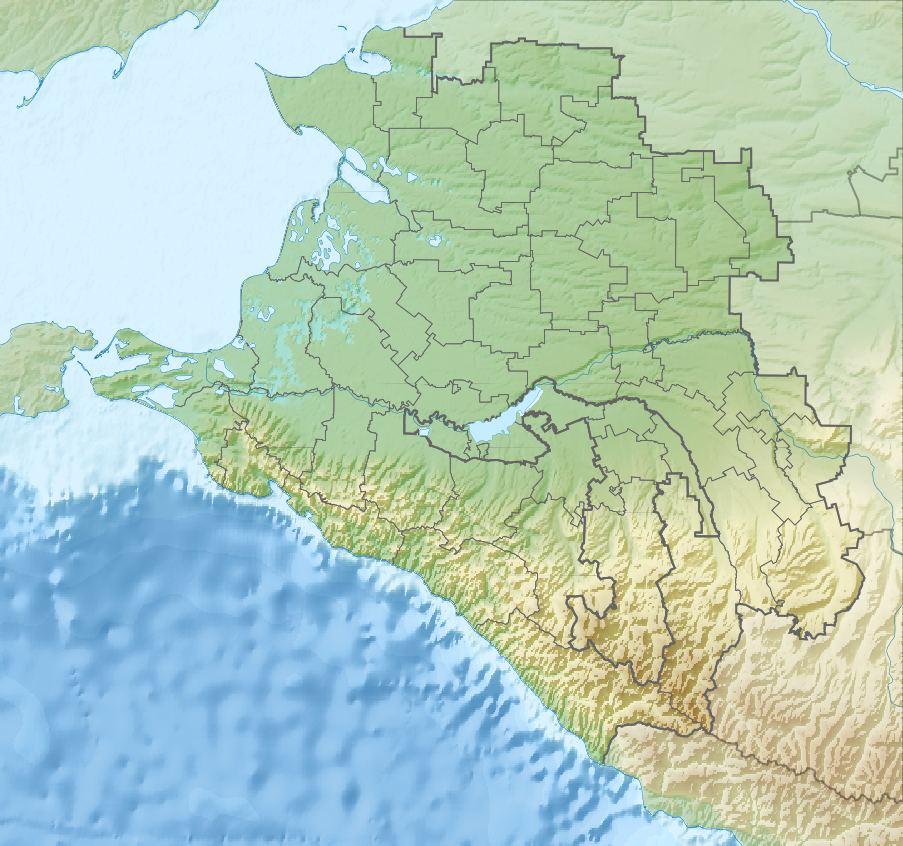
- Native name: Дагомыс (Russian)

Location
- Country: Russia

Physical characteristics
- Mouth: Black Sea
  - location: Sochi
  - coordinates: 43.6498°N 39.6524°E
- Length: 0.8 km (0.50 mi)
- Basin size: 103 km^{2} (40 sq mi)

The Dagomys (Russian: Дагомыс) is a river in the Caucasus that flows into the Black Sea. It has two tributaries; on the left is the Western Dagomys, and on the right is the Eastern Dagomys. The river flows through the City of Sochi. It is 0.8 kilometres (0.50 mi) long, with a drainage basin of 103 square kilometres (40 sq mi).
