= Lazarevskaya railway station =

Railway station in Sochi, Russia

Coordinates: 43°54′53″N 39°19′15″E

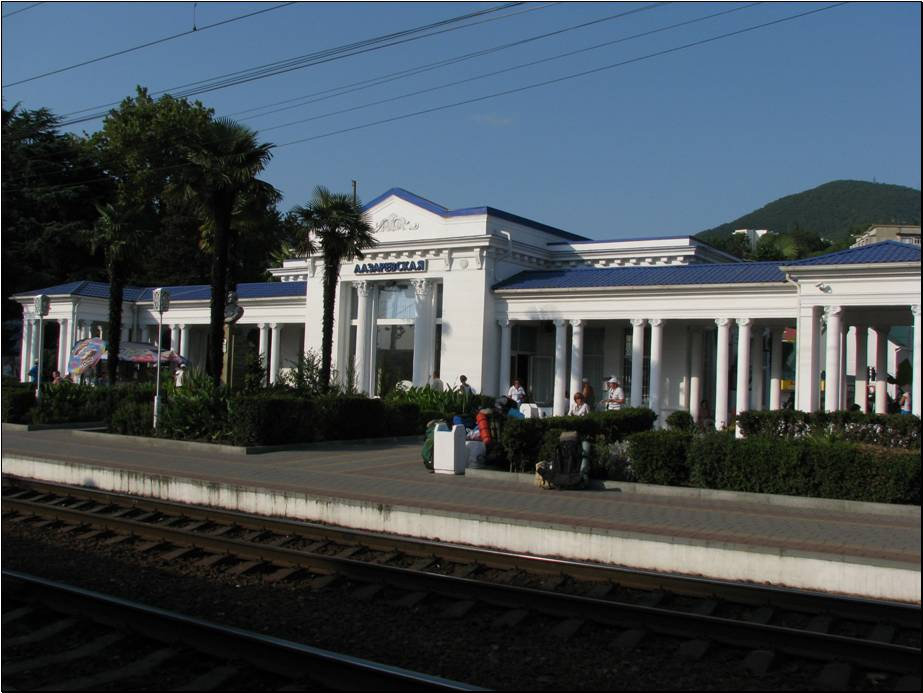
Lazarevskaya railway station in 2010

Lazarevskaya railway station (Russian: Железнодорожная станция Лазаревская) is a railway station of the North Caucasus Railway, subsidiary of Russian Railways, located in Lazarevskoye Microdistrict, Lazarevsky City District of the city of Sochi, Krasnodar Krai, Russia. The station was opened in 1918 and was renovated for the 2014 Winter Olympics.
