= Vardane Microdistrict =

Coordinates: 43°43′50″N 39°32′59″E

Vardane Вардане
- Location of Vardane
- Location of Vardane Vardane (Krasnodar Krai)
- Coordinates
- Country: Russia
- Federal subject: Krasnodar Krai
- Founded: 1872
- Postal code(s): 354209

Vardane (Russian: Вардане) is a microdistrict in Lazarevsky City District of the City of Sochi in Krasnodar Krai, Russia, located on the coast of the Black Sea at the influx of the Buu River. It was formerly a stand-alone settlement before being subsumed into Sochi. The Vardane railway station of the North Caucasus railway is located here. The microdistrict has a population of 5,000 people.

== History ==
Vardane (formerly known as Buap and Tsopsyn) is one of the oldest settlements on the territory of present-day Sochi. Its name is of Abkhaz origin and is linked to the Vardan family, whose name can be found in the toponymy of Abkhazia as well. From the 16th century onward, the Abazin population was being constantly expelled and assimilated by Ubykhs. Vardane became the center of the Ubykh society of Vardane, which comprises land stretching from the Buu River to the Mamaysky passage. The Dzepsh royal family ruled in this society.

During the Caucasian War from 1817 to 1864, Ubykhia became under control of Imam Shamil. At that time, Magomet Amin built the one and only fortress on the territory of Vardane. In 1864, the land of Vardane and the neighboring Uch-Dere were handed over to the Grand Duke Michael Nikolaevich of Russia.

== Infrastructure ==
Within the microdistrict are facilities for animal husbandry and greenhouses, as well as a school, a clinic, and several recreation centers such as "Sheksna" and "Vardane".
