= Port of Sochi =

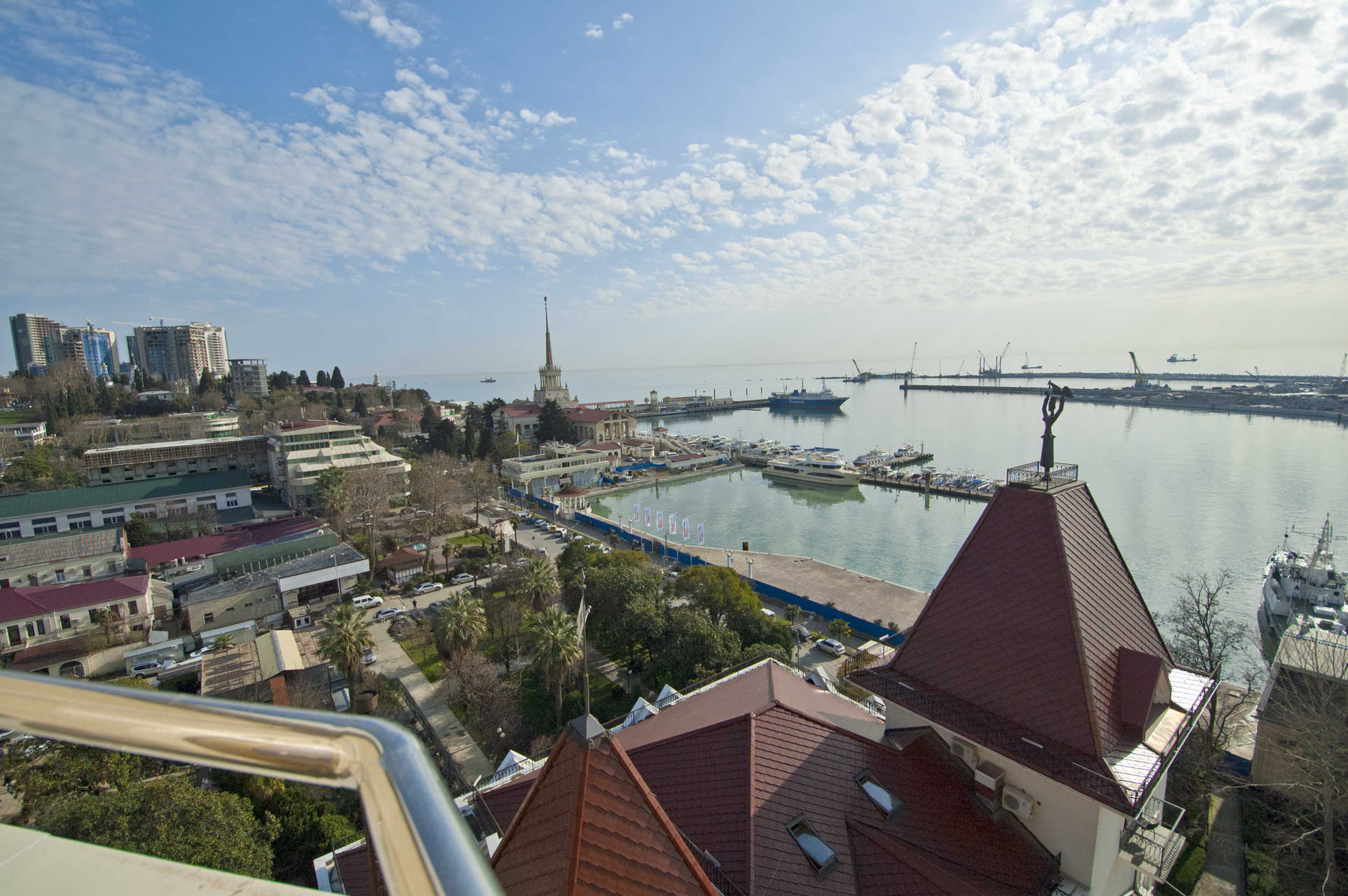
- View of the port, March 2013
- Click on the map for a fullscreen view
- Native name: Сочинский морской торговый порт

Location
- Country: Russia
- Location: Sochi, Krasnodar Krai
- Coordinates: 43°34′50″N 39°42′54″E
- UN/LOCODE: RUAER

Details
- Type of harbour: Sea
- Size: Medium

Statistics
- Website; Port of Astrakhan

The Commercial Sea Port of Sochi (Russian: Сочинский морской торговый порт) is a seaport on the Black Sea, the main focus of which is marine passenger transportation. Its headquarters is in the city district of Sochi, Krasnodar Krai, Russia.

== Overview ==
The port has two passenger berths that have a total length of 330 m, and can accommodate vessels up to 220 meters with a draft of 8.5 m. The port does not freeze; marine navigation is possible year round. Through it are provided passenger service from Poti and Batumi in Georgia, and cargo service to the Turkish ports of Trabzon and Istanbul. The seaport is a major railway station complex, which was built in 1955.

In 2013 the port was modernized as part of the renovations in the city for the 2014 Winter Olympics. New berths were constructed. Sochi seaport is now able to admit cruise ships up to 300 meters long almost all year round. Before reconstruction the seaport of Sochi could admit only cruise ships up to 200 meters long. After the reconstruction the port was able to admit simultaneously two cruise ships and a ferry. In addition, hydrotechnical facilities were capitally repaired and the front side promenade was tidied up.

== Gallery ==
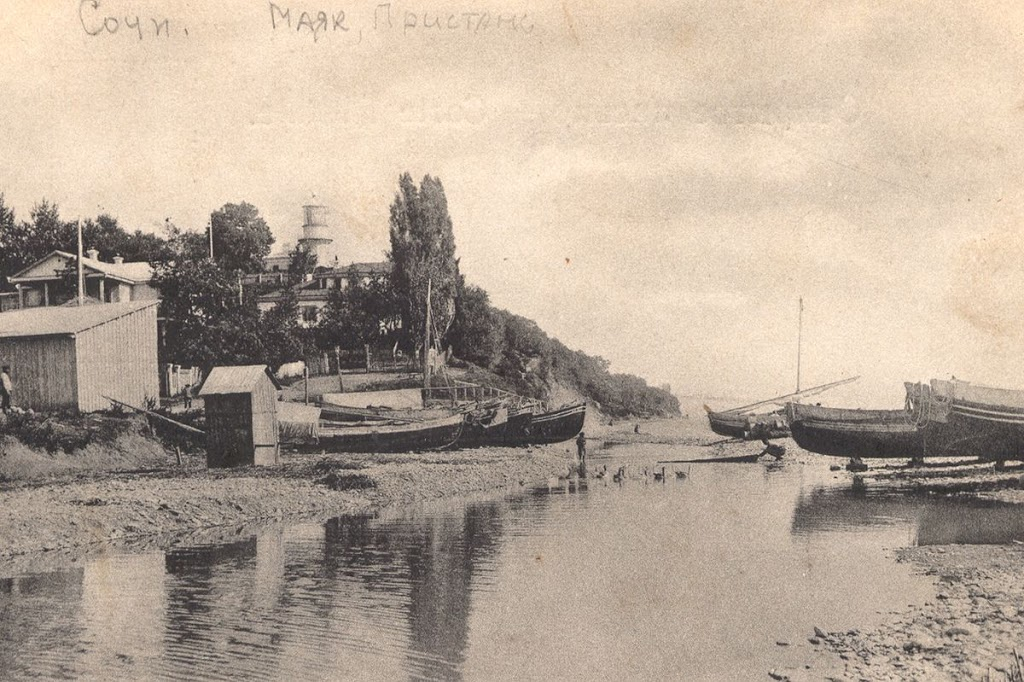
Sochi wharf, 1910

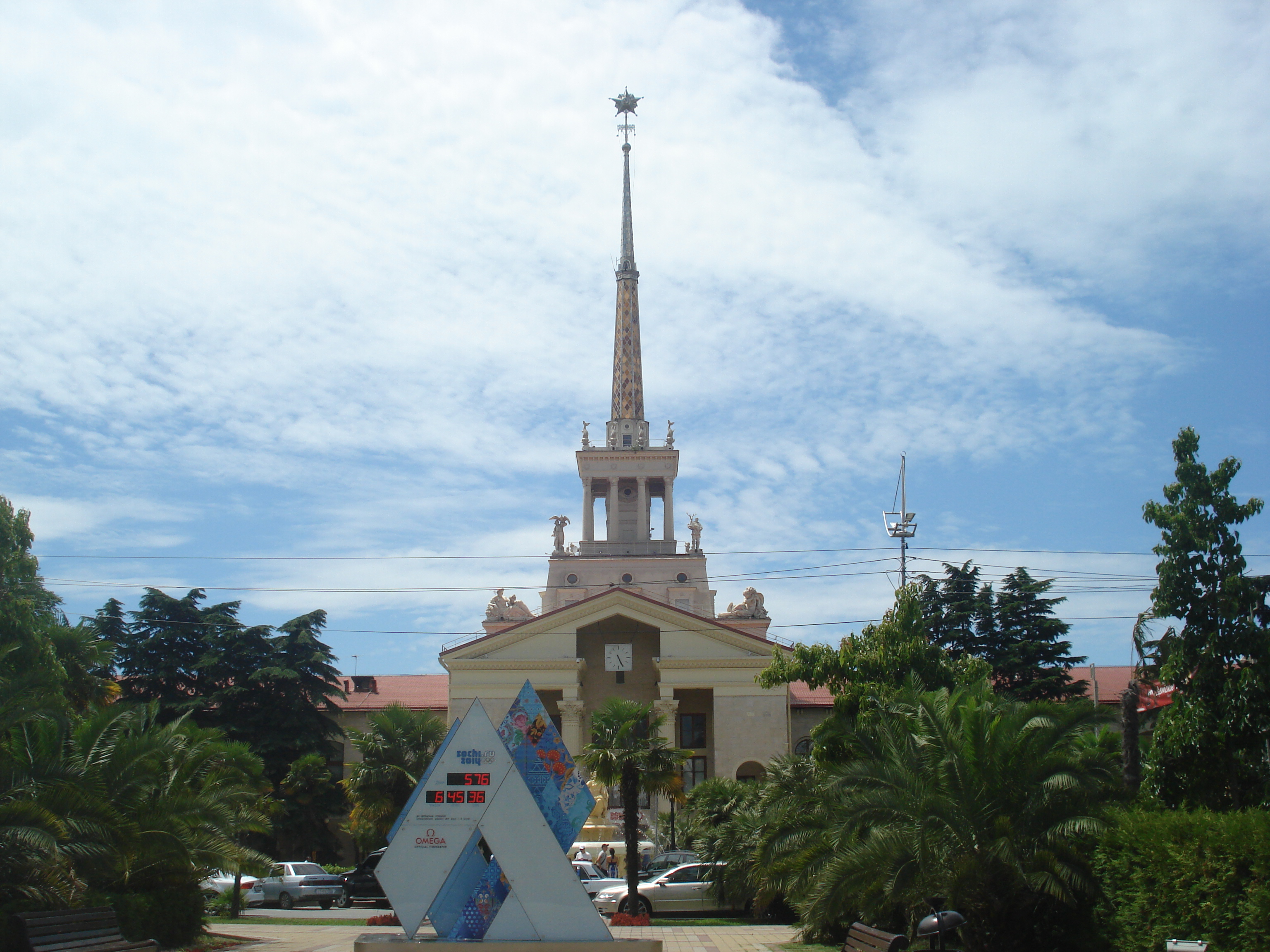
Marine passenger terminal built in Stalinist architecture (architect Karo Halabyan)

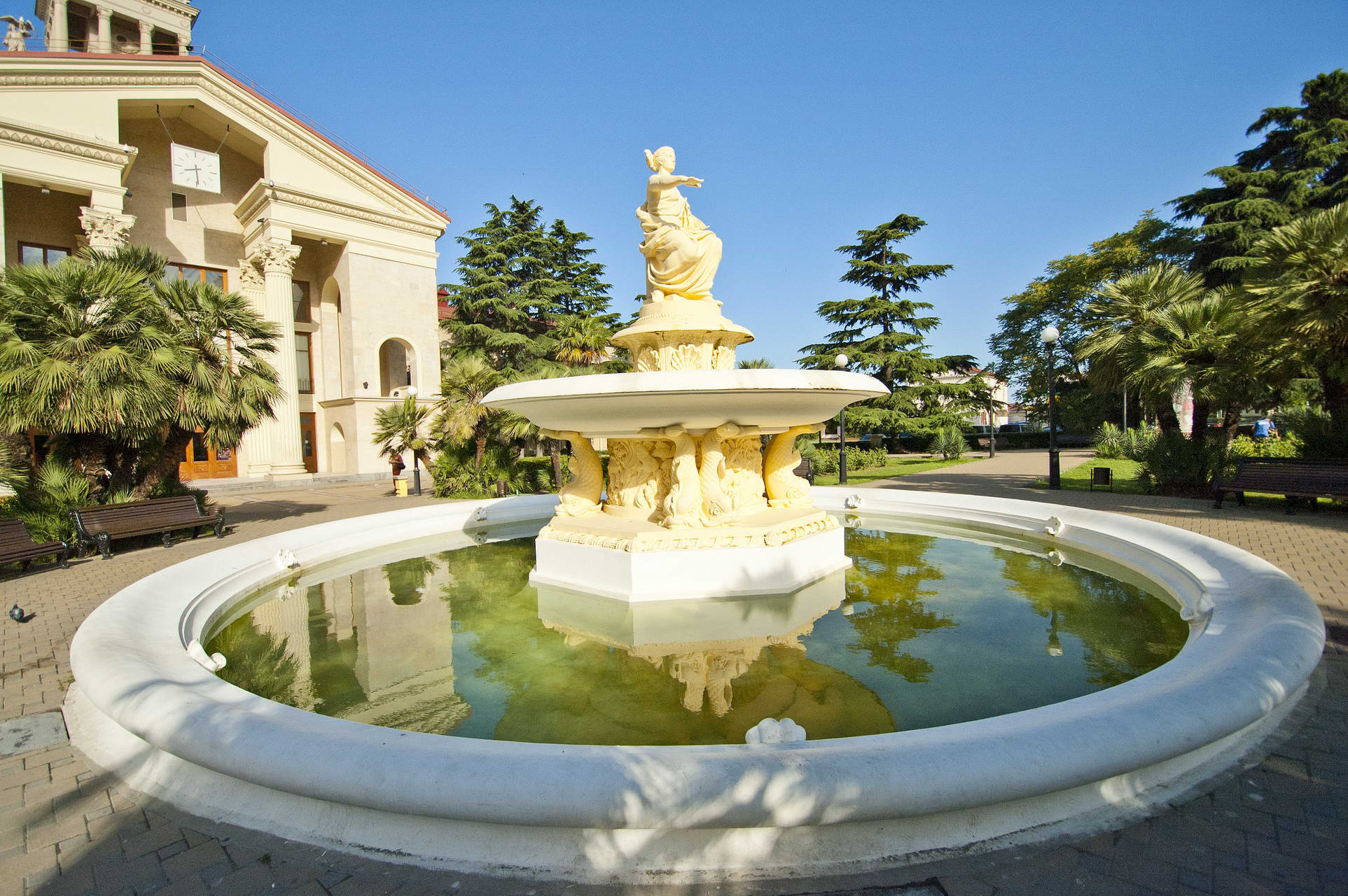
Fountain "The goddess of navigation" in front of the passenger terminal

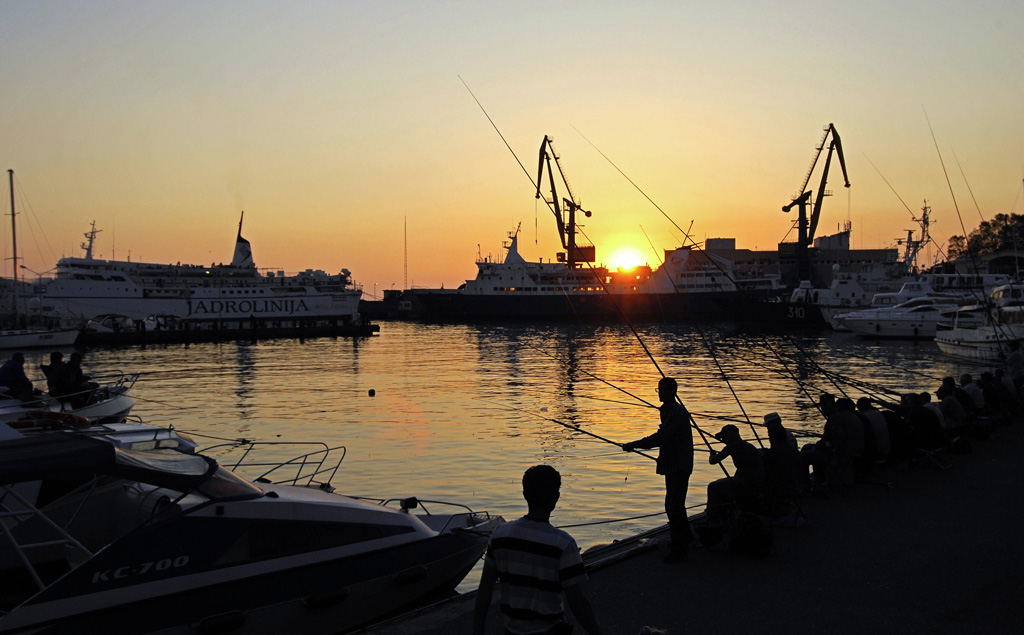
Angling in the port
