= Marine Station (Sochi) =

Marine passenger terminal in Krasnodar Krai, Russia

Coordinates: 43°34′50″N 39°43′06″E

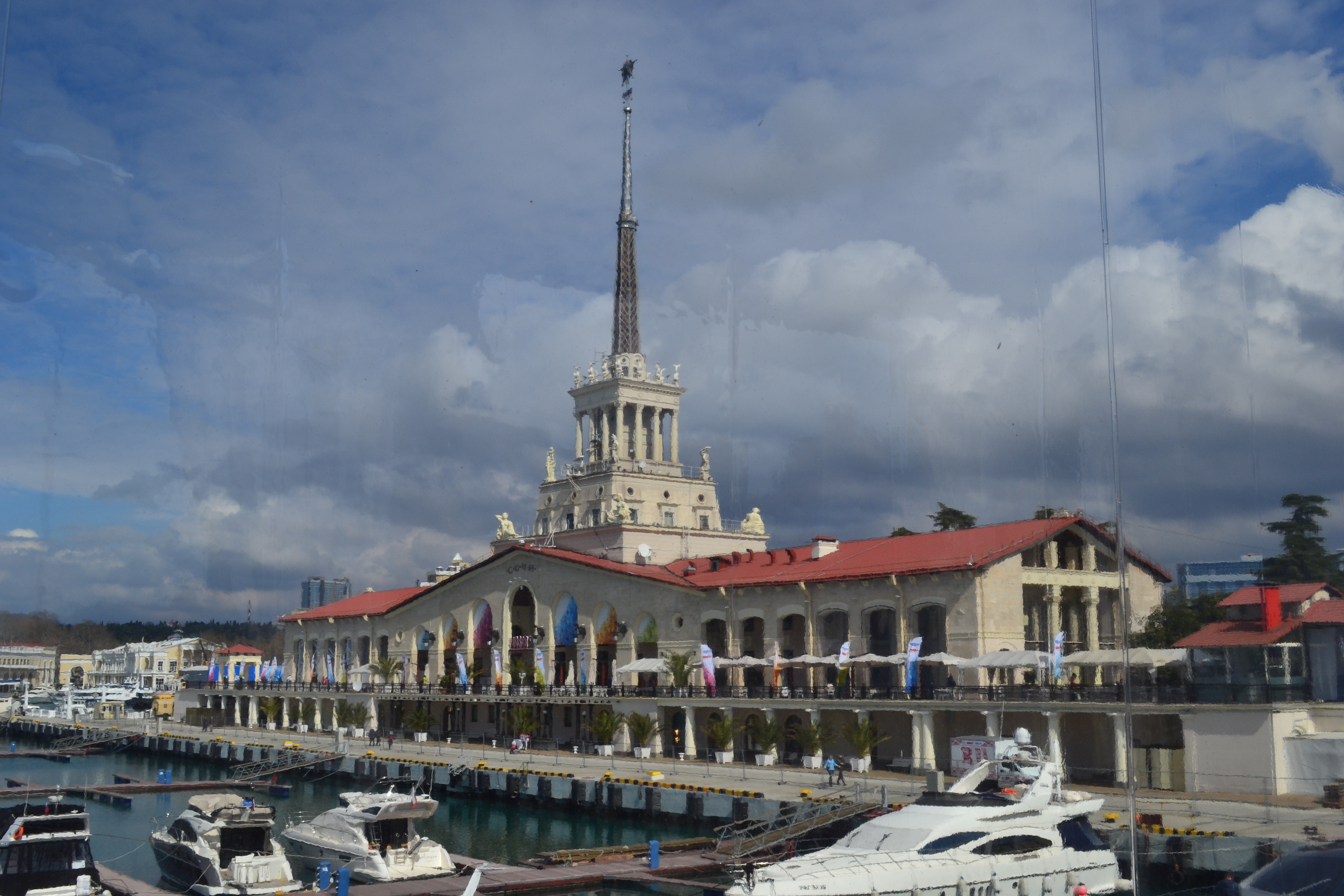
The Marine Terminal building

The Marine Station or Marine Terminal (Russian: Морской вокзал) is a marine passenger terminal in the port of Sochi, Krasnodar Krai, Russia.

== History ==
The building was built in 1955, to the design of architects Karo Halabyan and Leonid Karlik.

It is listed as an object of cultural heritage of Russia of federal significance. The centre of the building is topped by a 71-meter three-tiered tower and spire made of polished stainless steel. The tower is decorated with sculptures by Valentin Ingal. They represent the four seasons and the four cardinal points. A fountain stands in front of the terminal, with a statue of the goddess of navigation.

== Destinations ==
Vessels from the terminal sail to a number of destinations, including Batumi, Gagra, Trabzon, Novorossiysk, Yalta, and Sevastopol.

== In popular culture ==
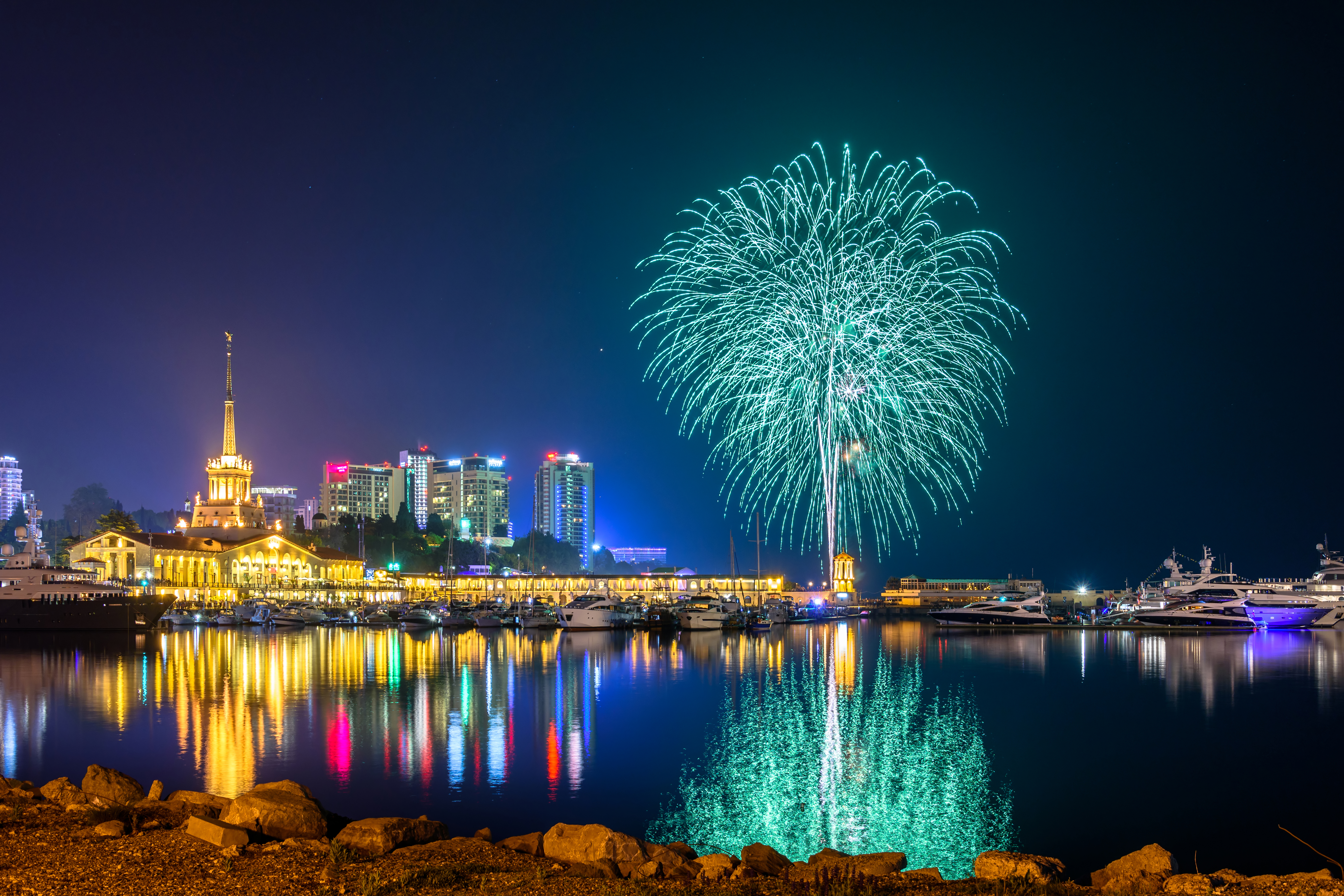
The terminal at left illuminated during Victory Day celebrations, 9 May 2015

A scene of the Soviet film The Diamond Arm was filmed at the main deep-water berths for cruise liners. It showed protagonist Semen Semenovich Gorbunkov's farewell to his family as he began his journey on the ship Mikhail Svetlov.
