= Tsentralny city district, Sochi =

Tsentralny city district Центральный внутригородской район
- District
- Tsentralny city district in Sochi
- Coordinates: 43°48′N 39°30′E
- Country: Russia
- Federal subject: Krasnodar Krai
- City: Sochi
- Established: February 10, 1961

Area
  - Total: 30.37 km^{2} (11.73 sq mi)

Population (2010 Census)
  - Total: 137,677
  - Estimate (January 2014): 170,578
  - Density: 4,533/km^{2} (11,740/sq mi)

Tsentralny city district (Russian: Центра́льный внутригородско́й райо́н) is one of four city districts of the city of Sochi in Krasnodar Krai, Russia. Sometimes referred to as "Sochi proper", it borders Lazarevsky city district in the west and Khostinsky city district in the north and in the east. In the southwest, it is bounded by the Black Sea. Population: 137,677 (2010 Census); 133,935 (2002 Census); 137,968 (1989 Soviet census).

== Geography ==
It is the core, historic, and most populous city district of Sochi, but also the smallest in terms of area, covering only 30.37 square kilometers (11.73 sq mi).

== Landmarks ==
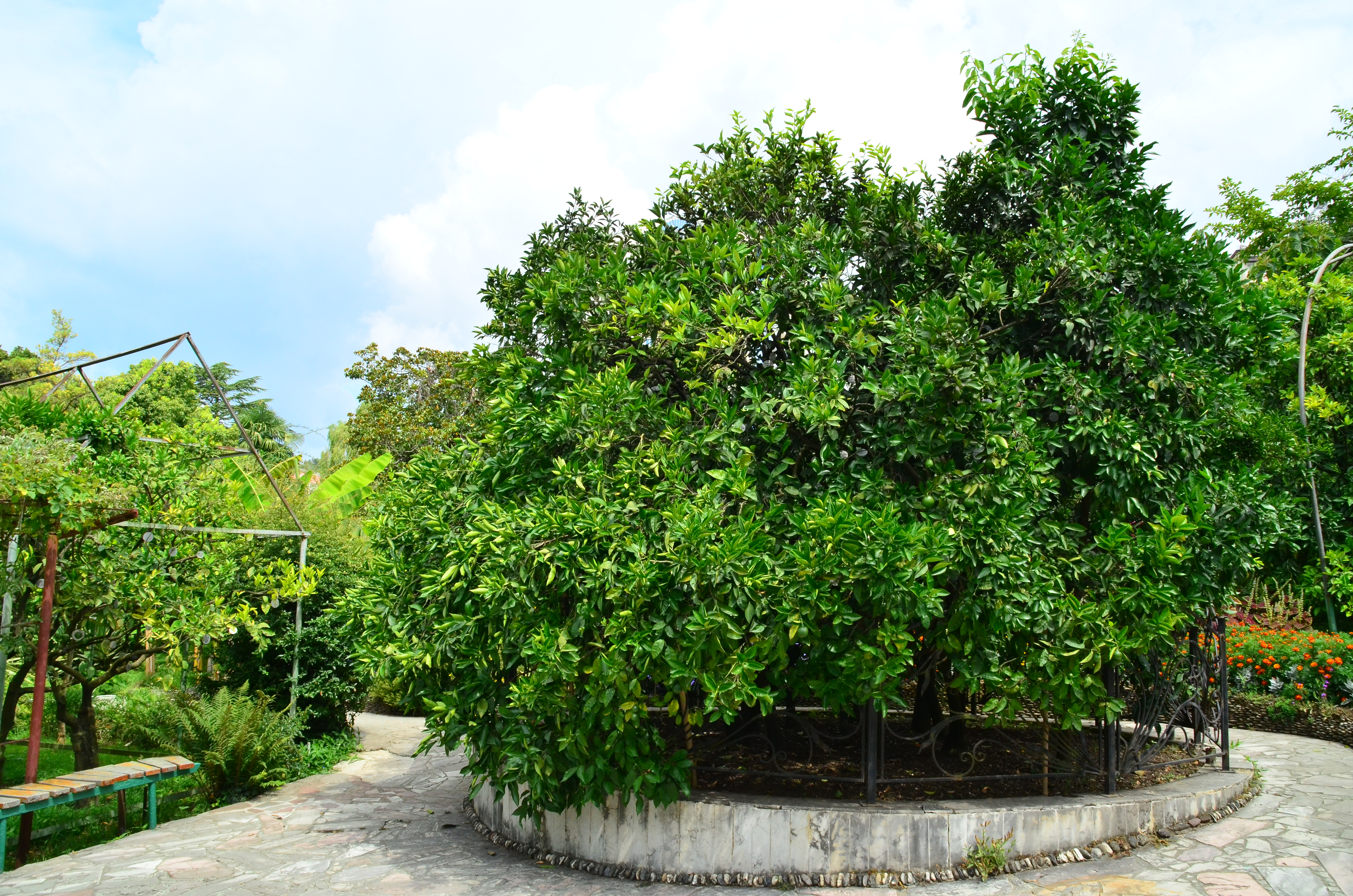
Friendship Tree in the Subtropical Botanical Garden

- The Friendship Tree and the Friendship Tree Garden Museum, in the Subtropical Botanical Garden
- St. Michael's Cathedral, Sochi, a diminutive church built in 1873–1891 to Alexander Kaminsky's designs in order to commemorate the victorious conclusion of the Caucasian War
- The red-granite Archangel Column, erected in 2006 in memory of the Russian soldiers fallen in Sochi during the Caucasian War. It is capped by a 7-meter (23 ft) bronze statue of Sochi's patron saint, Archangel Michael.
- Sochi Art Museum occupies a large building with a four-columned portico, completed in 1939. Its Neoclassical design is by Ivan Zholtovsky.
- Sochi Arboretum, a large botanical garden with tropical trees from many countries and the Mayors Alley—the line of palm-trees planted by the mayors of different cities of the world.
- The Winter Theater (1934–1937), another rigorously Neoclassical edifice, surrounded by eighty-eight Corinthian columns, with a pediment bearing the statues of Terpsichore, Melpomene, and Thalia; all three cast by Vera Mukhina.
- Hall of Organ and Chamber Music. Centrally located, it conducts organ, symphony, chamber-ensemble, choral, and vocal music concerts.

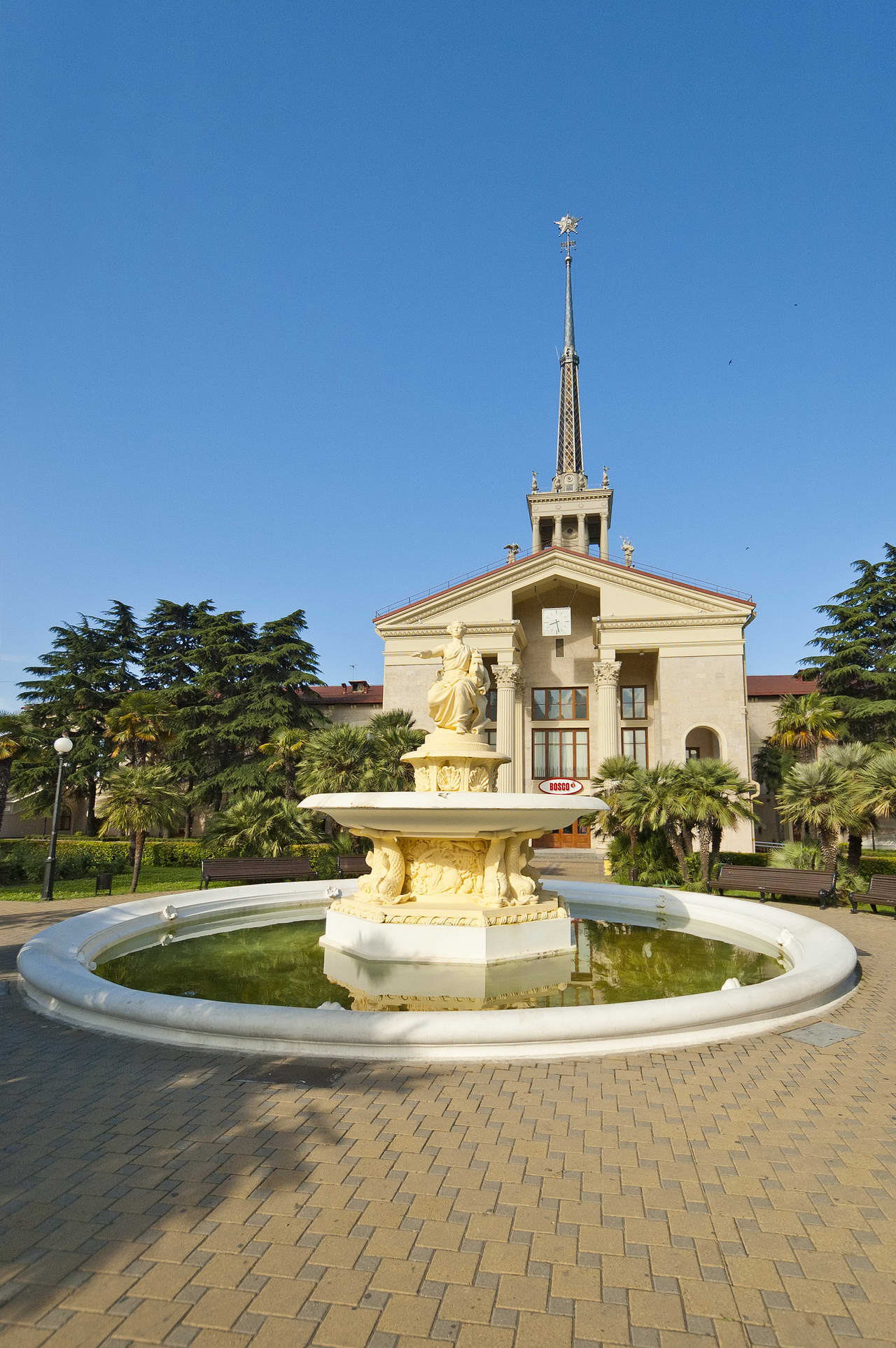
Maritime Passenger Terminal in Port of Sochi.

- The Maritime Passenger Terminal (1955), notable for its distinctive 71-meter (233 ft)-high steepled tower and four statues symbolizing the cardinal points
- The railway station (1952)
- The Riviera Park, established by Vasily Khludov in 1883 in the part of the city which later became known as Khludovskaya. The park is popular with tourists and local residents alike. It has a variety of attractions, including an outcrop of funny statues and a "glade of friendship" where magnolia trees were planted by every Soviet cosmonaut, among other notables.
