= Friendship Tree =

Citrus tree in Sochi, Russia

Friendship Tree Friendship Tree Garden Museum
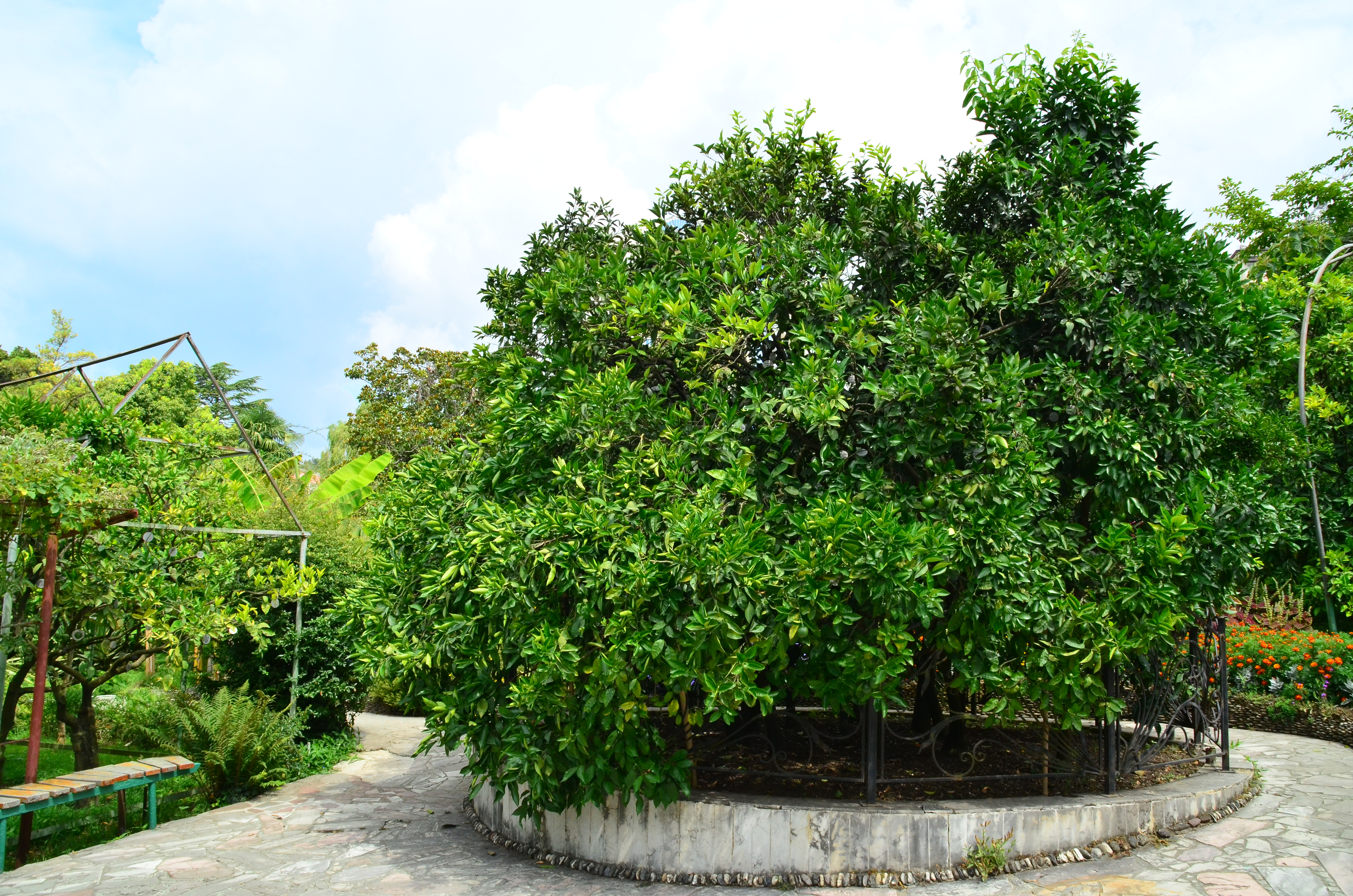
- The Friendship Tree, in the Subtropical Botanical Garden.
- Interactive map of Friendship Tree; Friendship Tree Garden Museum
- Type: Botanical
- Location: 2/28 Fabritsiusa Street, Tsentralny city district, Sochi, Russia, 354002
- Opened: 1940
- Owner: Institute of Floriculture and Subtropical Crops
- Operator: Russian Scientific Botanical Institute.
- Species: > 200, in eighty Families.
- Collections: subtropical fruits, subtropical ornamental plants.
- Website: www.vniisubtrop.ru/derevo-druzhby.html

The Friendship Tree is a unique citrus tree, in the Friendship Tree Garden Museum and Subtropical Botanical Garden, in the Tsentralny city district of Sochi, on the east coast of the Black Sea in southern Russia.

The Friendship Tree grew to prominence from the numerous citrus sprigs grafted to it by people of 167 countries from around the world, as symbols of international friendship and living in harmony with nature.

== History ==
The Friendship Tree was planted as a scientific experiment to create a new hybrid of mandarin orange, by FM Zorin in Sochi Agricultural and garden Experiment Station. The tree's experiments became a collection of 45 different types of citrus fruit grafted on it, with more planted in the botanical gardens.

In 1940 the arctic explorer and Soviet scientist Otto Yulyevich Schmidt visited the tree and botanical garden. As a token of his love for the nature of his Soviet Union homeland, he grafted a new citrus bud on the crown of the tree.

People from various countries, nationalities, professions, and religions later continued the example, creating a tradition. The experimental citrus tree was named the Friendship Tree in 1957, upon the suggestion of Vietnamese doctors.

Commemorative grafts have been added onto the Tree of Friendship by many heads of state; prominent public figures and politicians; representatives from the sciences, arts, and culture; as well as astronauts, athletes, military, and religious figures. Among these are the Soviet figure skating Olympic Gold Medalist Irina Rodnina in 1976, and Secretary-General of the United Nations Ban Ki-moon in 2013. Each graft has a round metal tag attached, with the grafter's name and event's date.

== Botanical garden ==
The Subtropical Botanical Garden is a unique botanical garden and a natural history museum, and part of the Russian Institute of Floriculture and Subtropical Crops. The garden features the Friendship Tree and Friendship Tree Garden Museum, and also living collections of subtropical fruit, flowering, and subtropical climate ornamental plants. Plants of eighty botanical families are grown and displayed here. The botanical garden also has garden paths, ornamental ponds, and garden sitting lounges.

=== Museum ===
The Friendship Tree Garden Museum displays:

- history of the Friendship Tree in words and images.
- volumes of guest signature books, with thoughts of peace, friendship, and harmony inspired by the Friendship Tree, written by Russian and international visitors.
- numerous gifts commemorating the Friendship Tree, representing cultures and traditions around the world.

== See also ==
- Citrus hybrids
- Grafting
- Subtropical climate

== Gallery ==
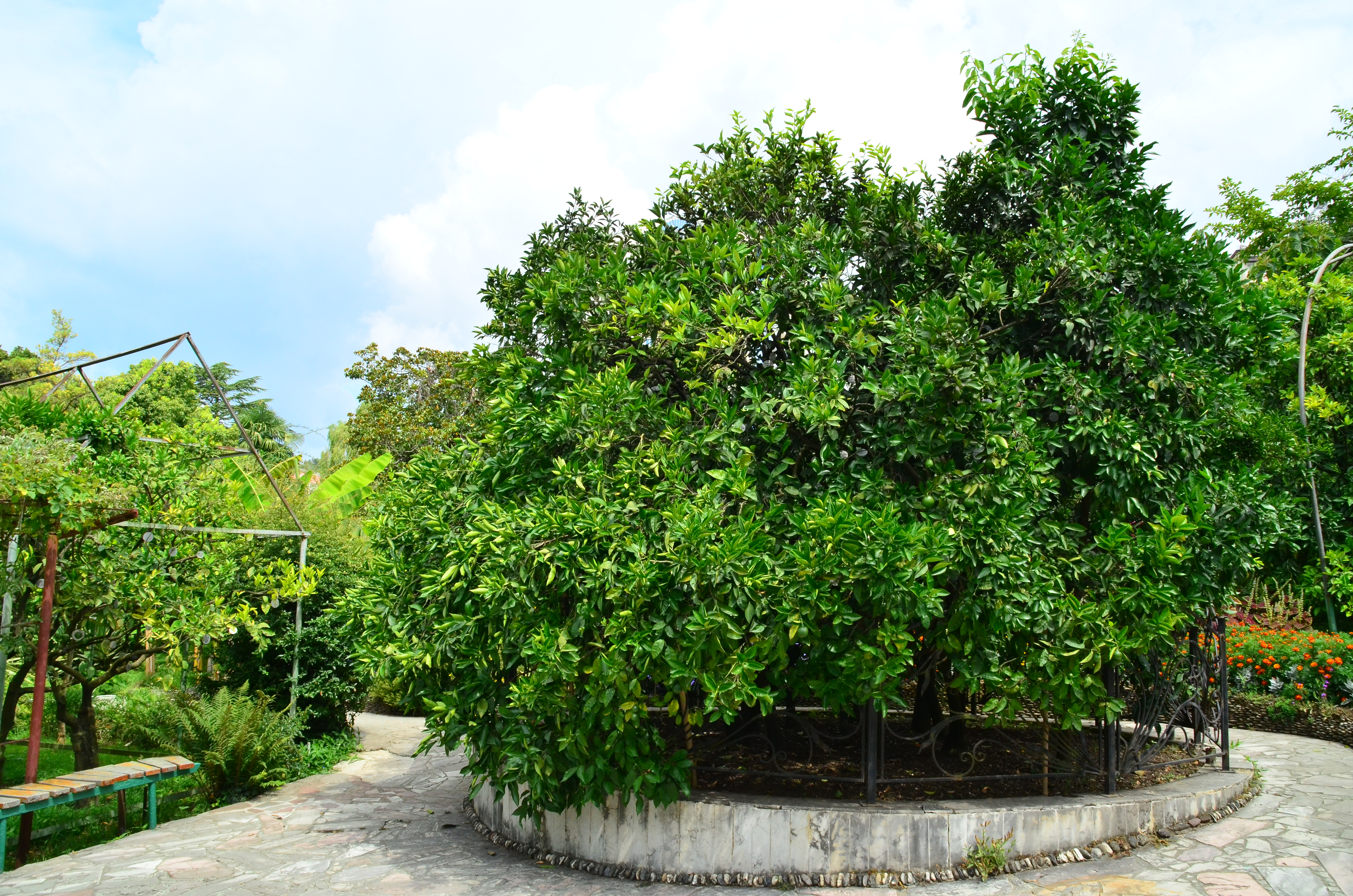
Friendship Tree in the Subtropical Botanical Garden

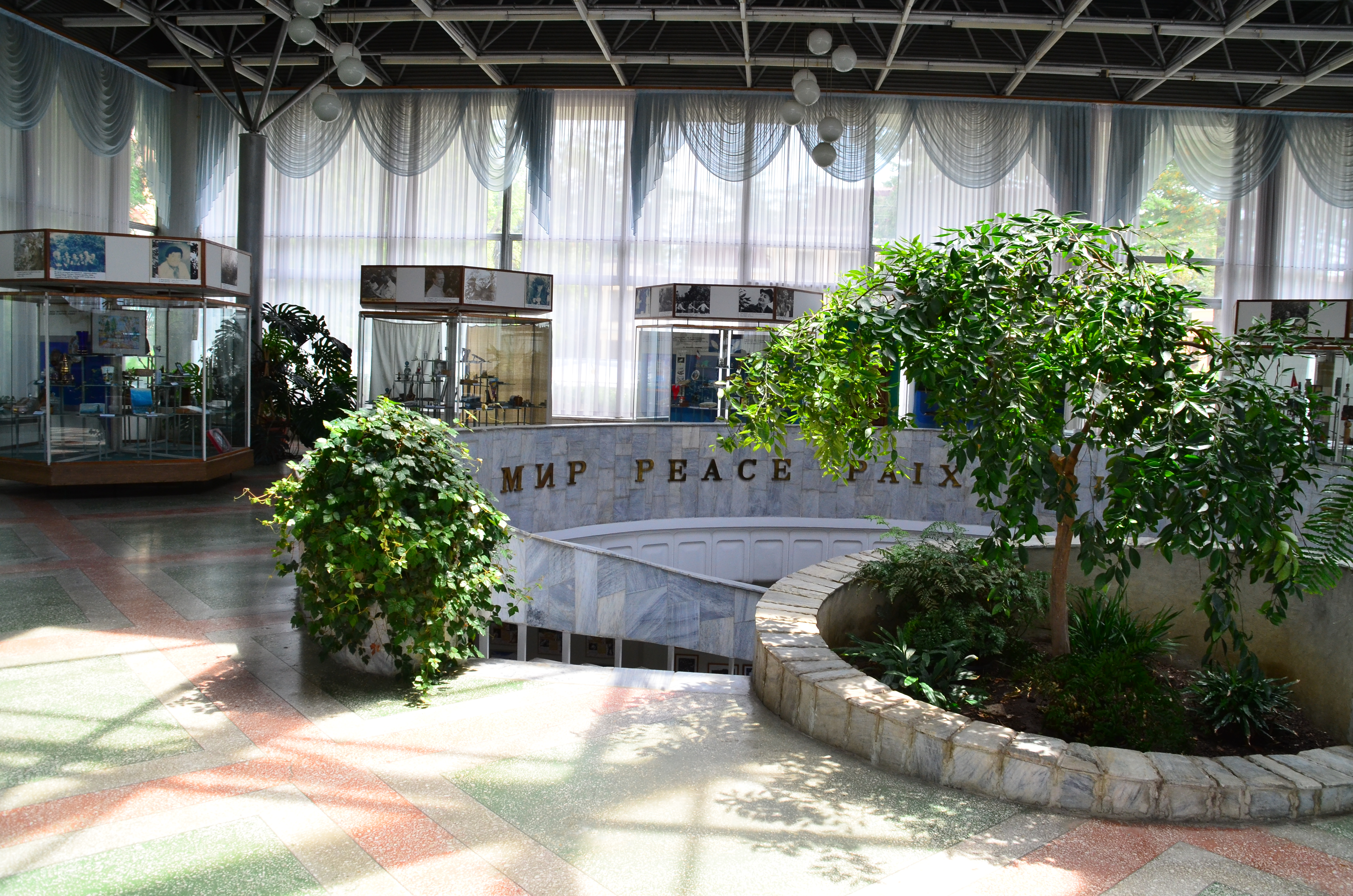
Friendship Tree Garden Museum structure

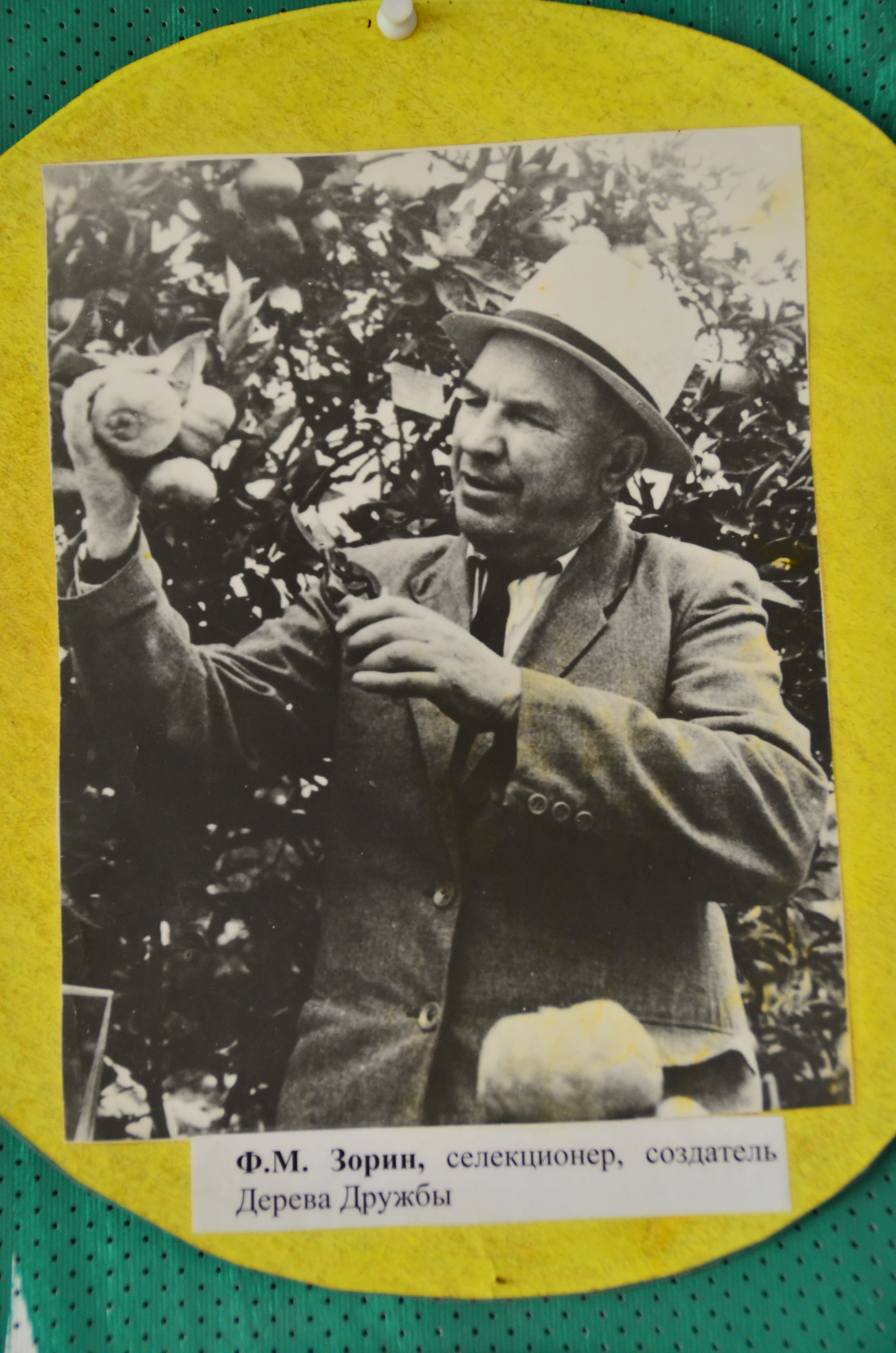
FM Zorin — the founder of the Friendship Tree and Subtropical Botanical Garden

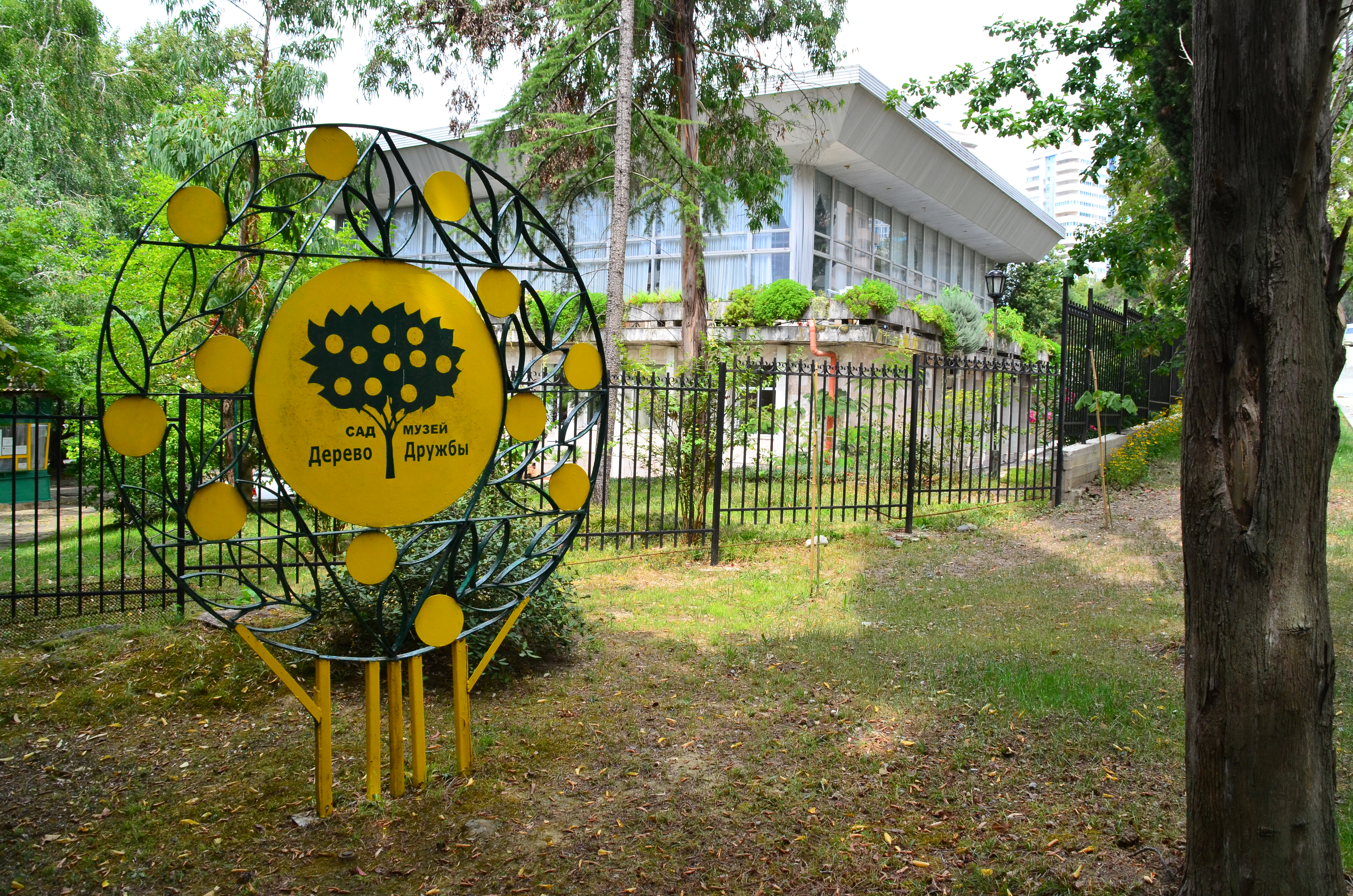
Near the entrance to the Subtropical Botanical Garden

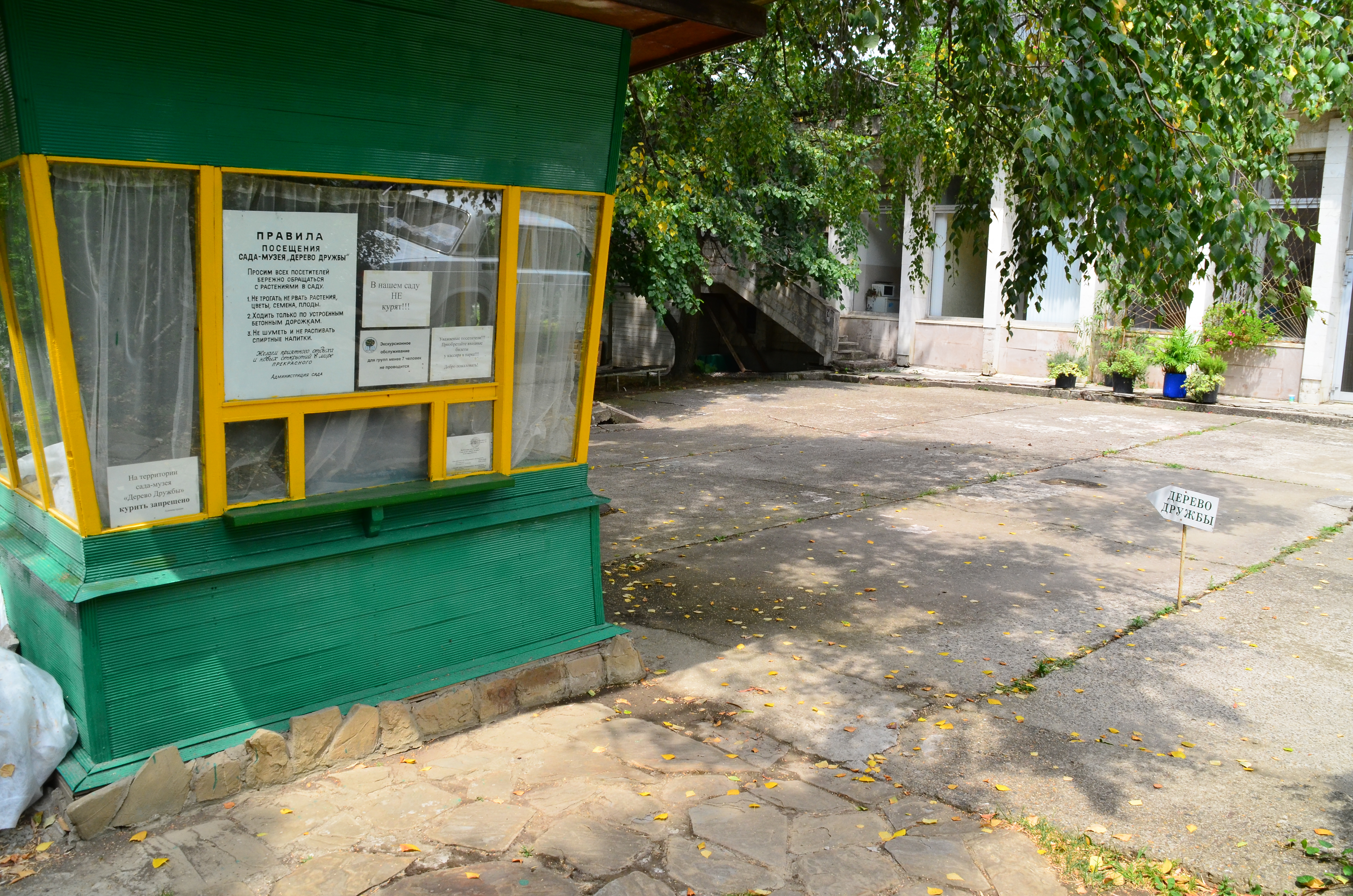
Entrance kiosk to the Subtropical Botanical Garden

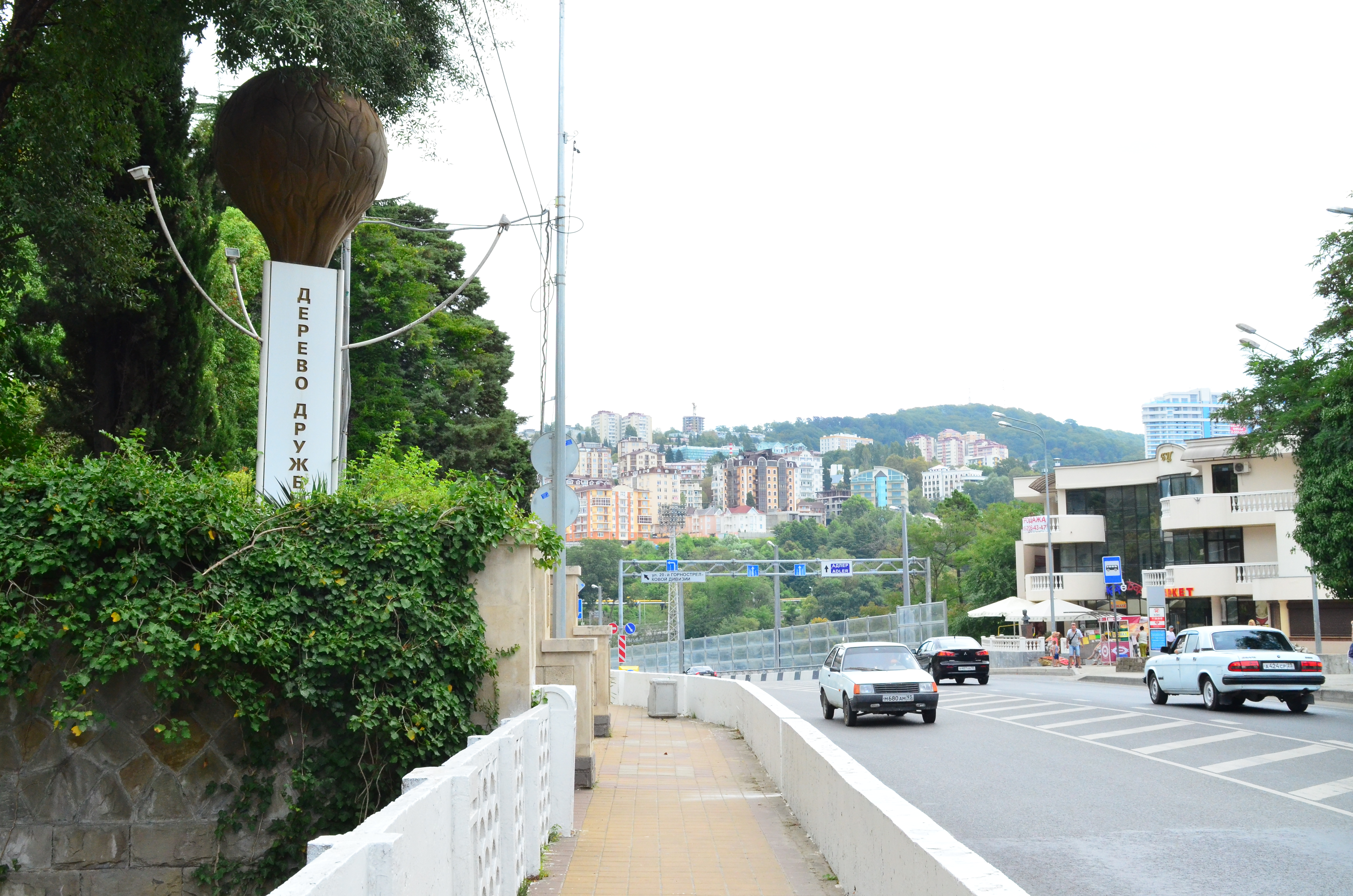
Friendship Tree Garden Museum sign on Kurortniy Prospect Street

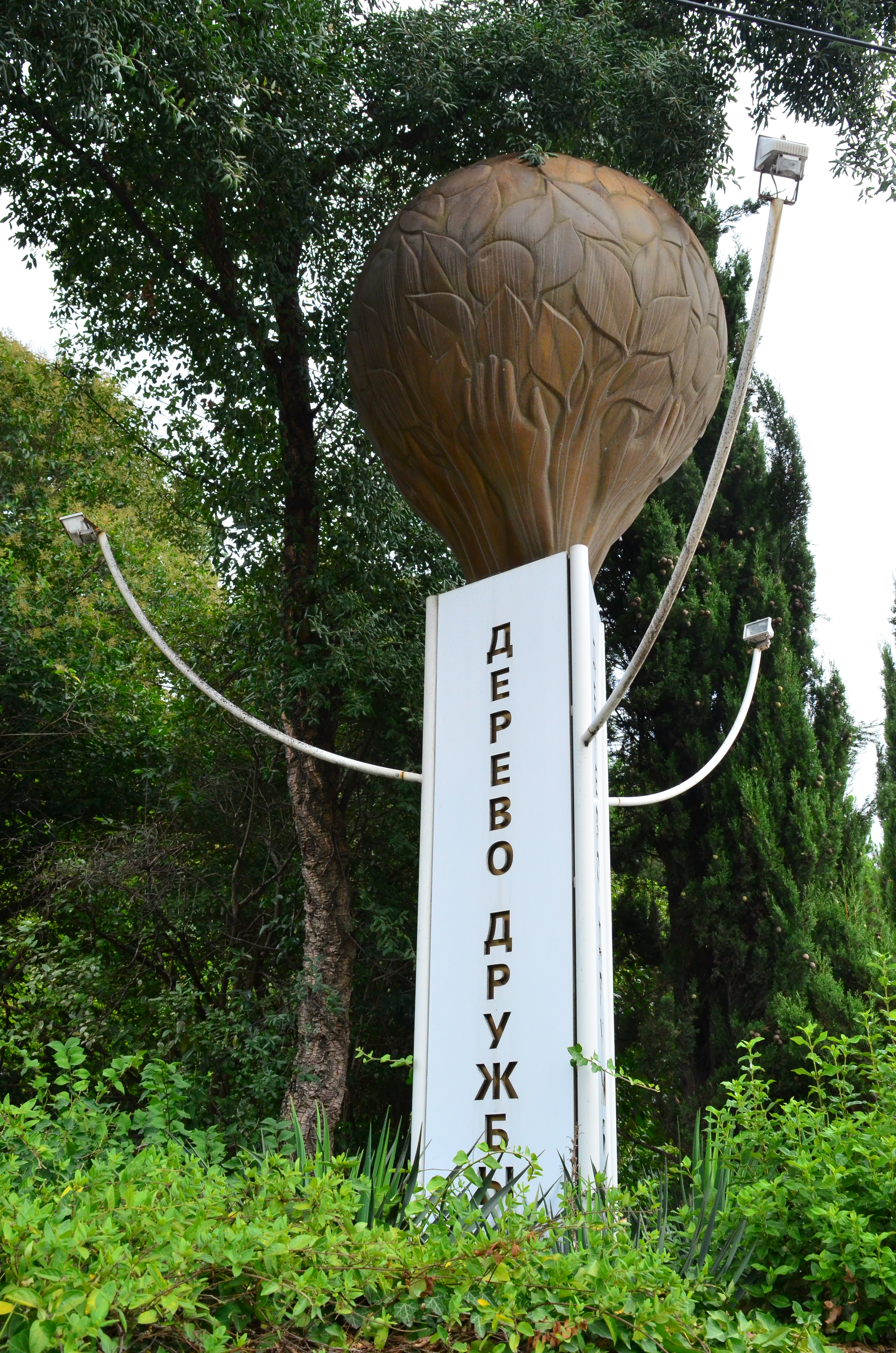
Friendship Tree Garden Museum sign

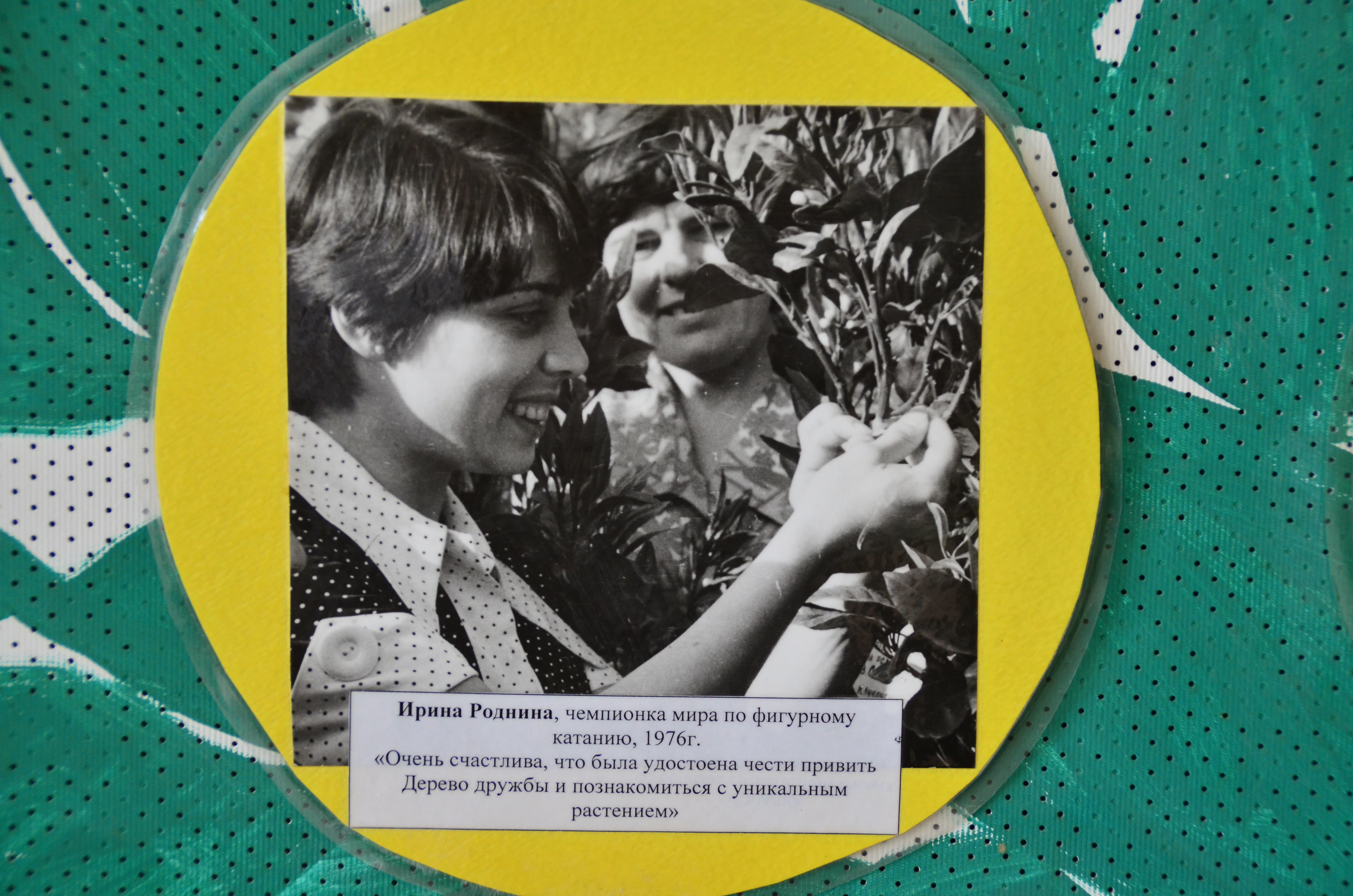
Irina Rodnina placing graft on Friendship Tree (1976)

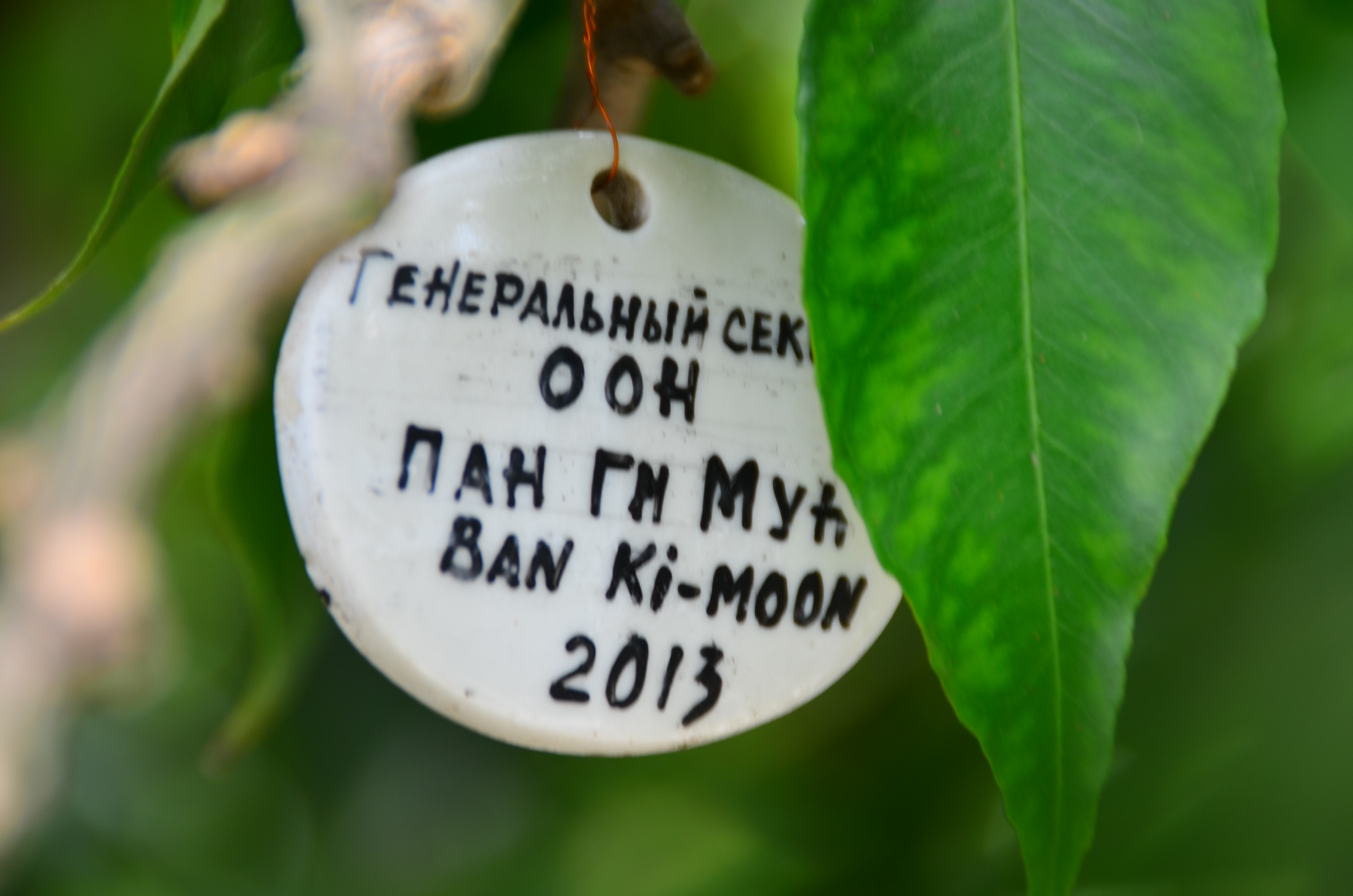
Ban Ki-moon graft label (2013)

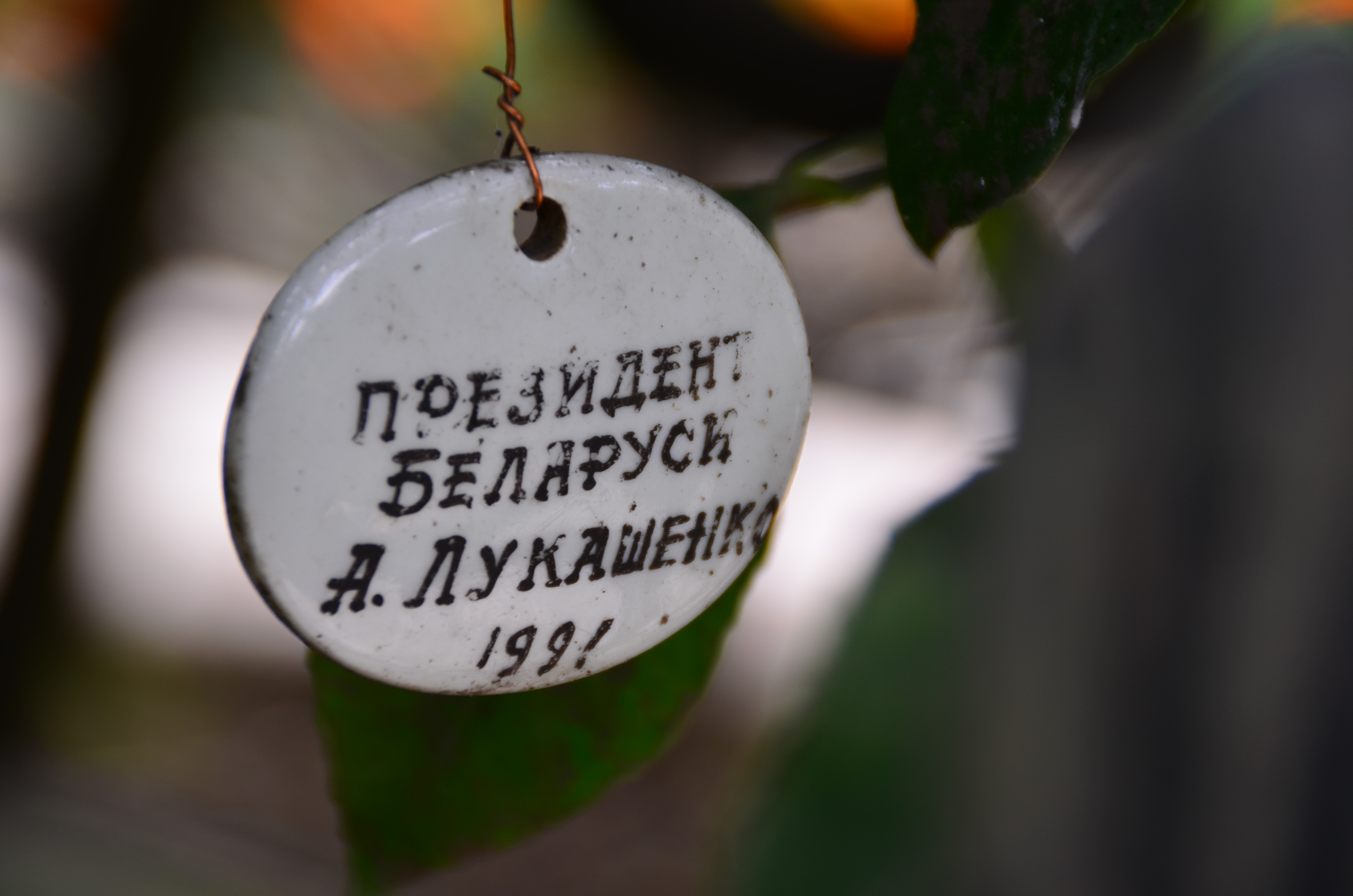
Belarus president Alexander Lukashenko graft label (1991).

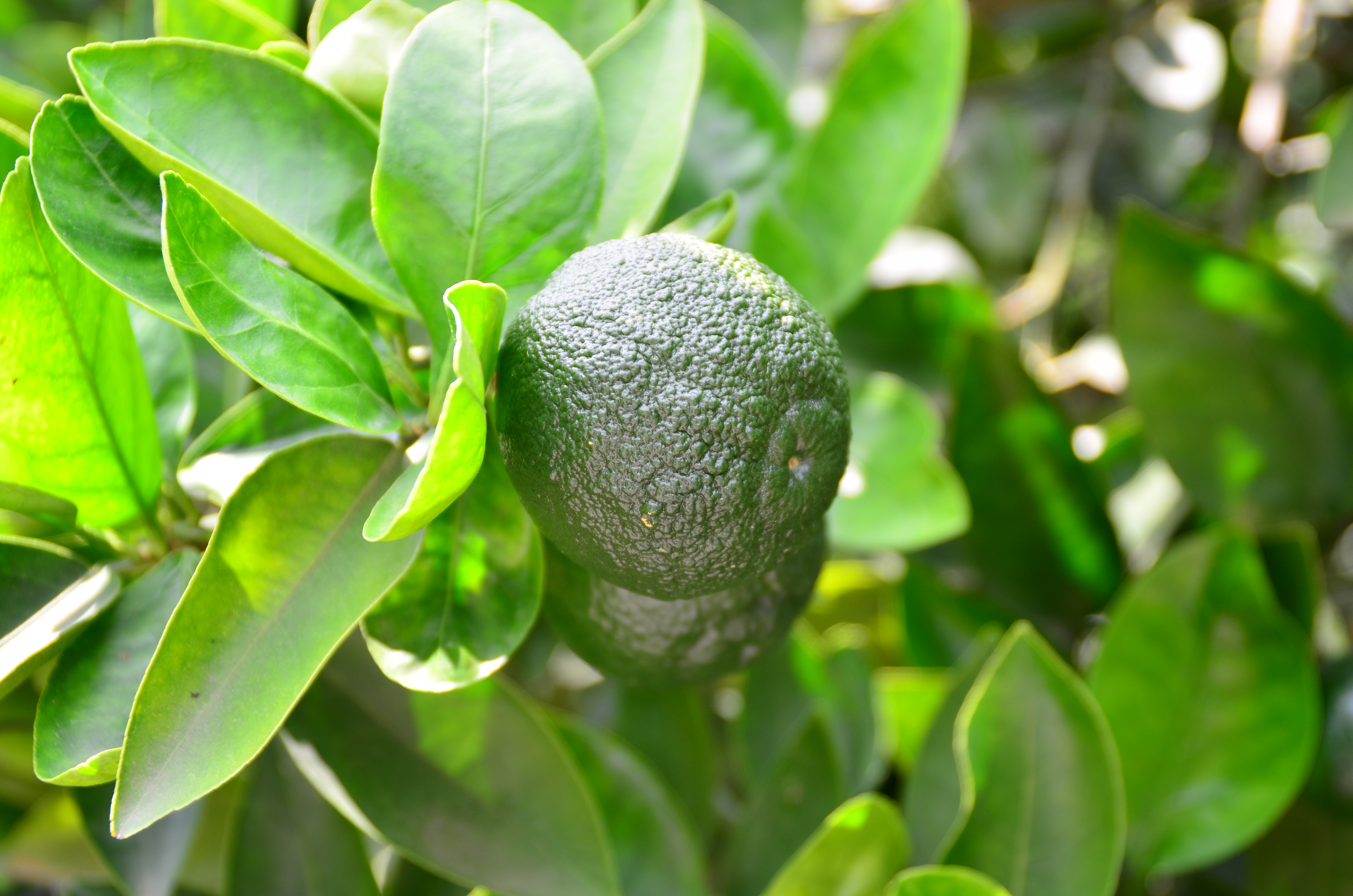
Tangerine in the Subtropical Botanical Garden

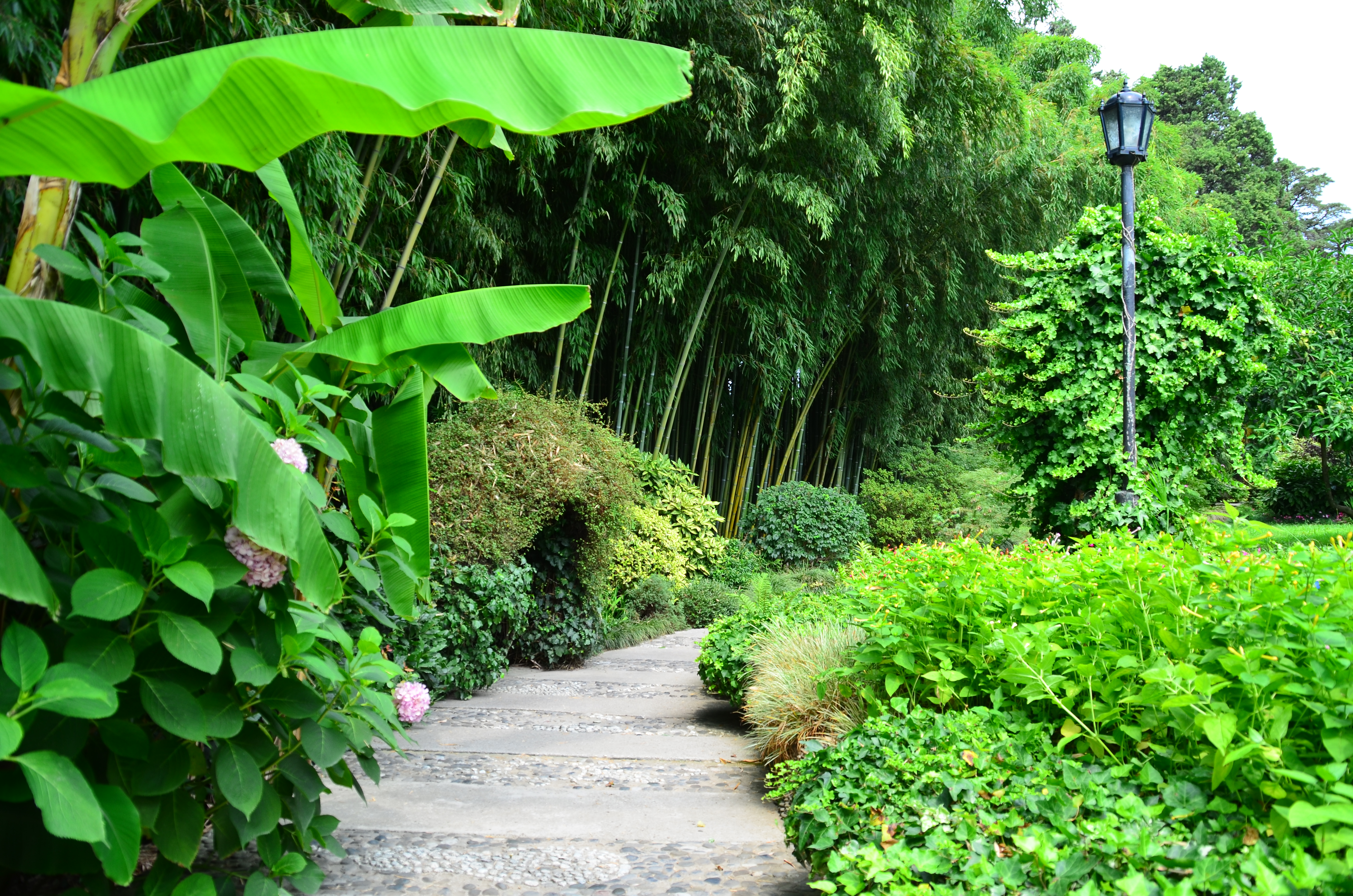
Path in the botanical garden

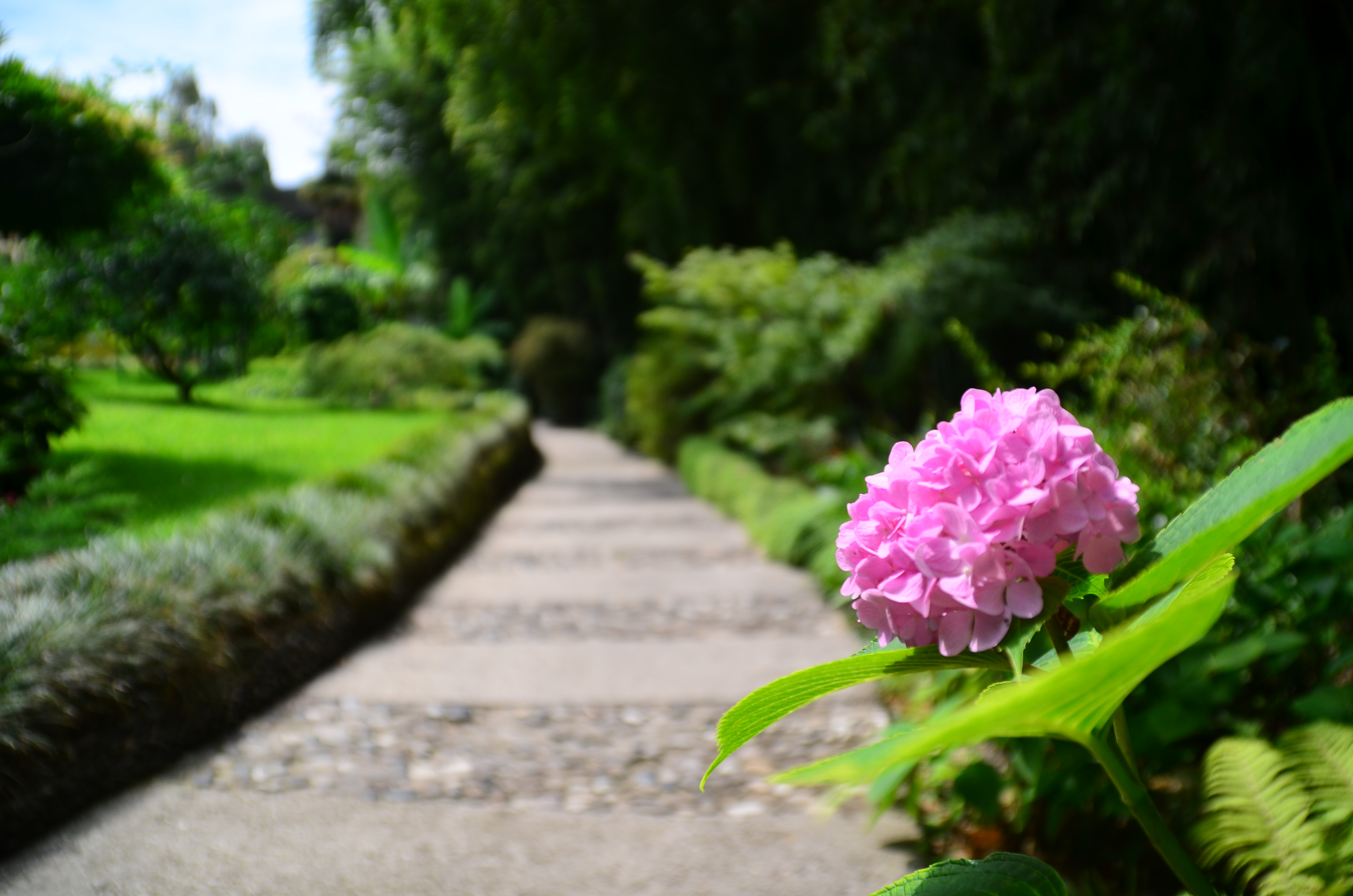
Flower in the botanical garden

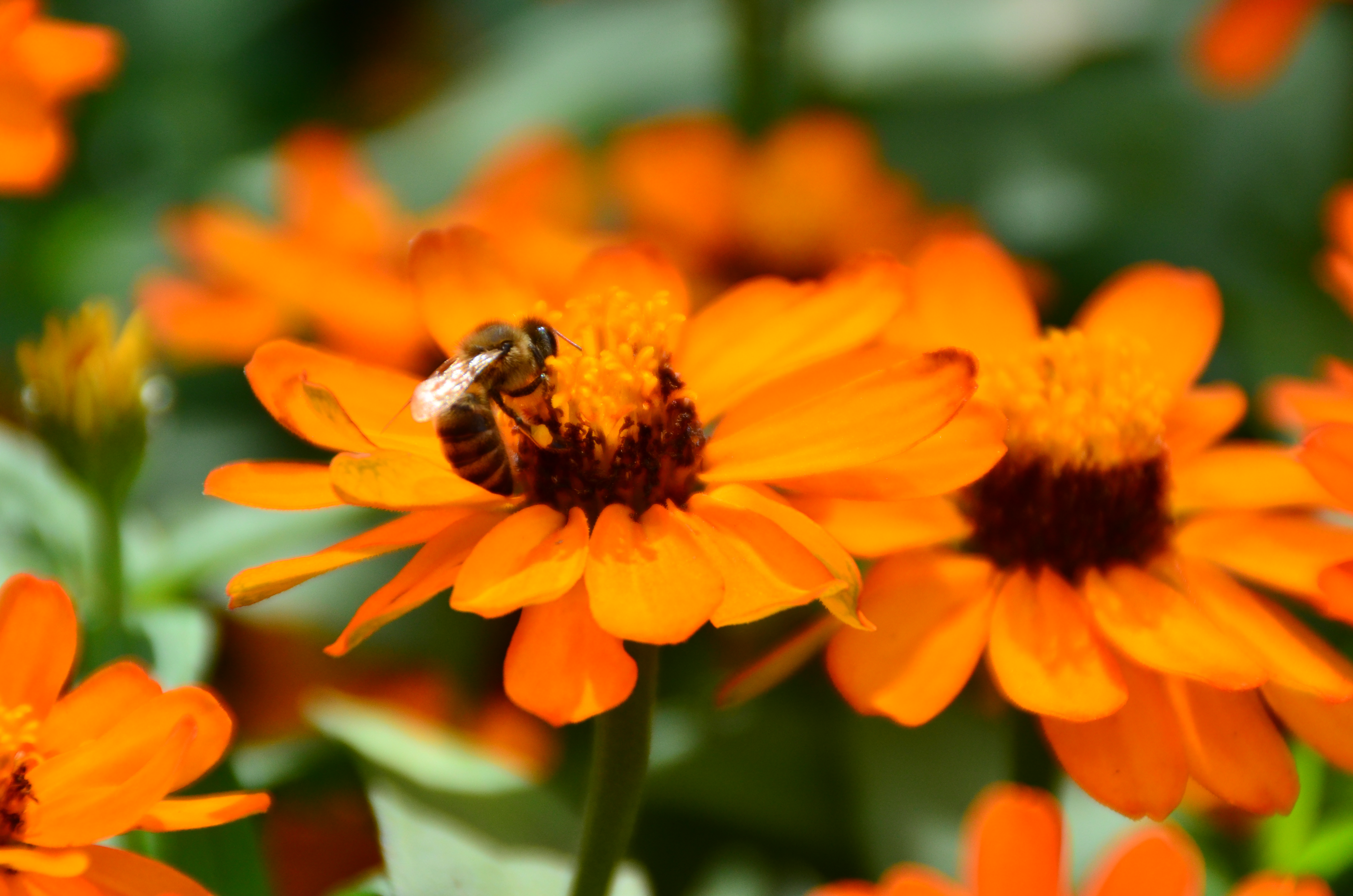
Bee

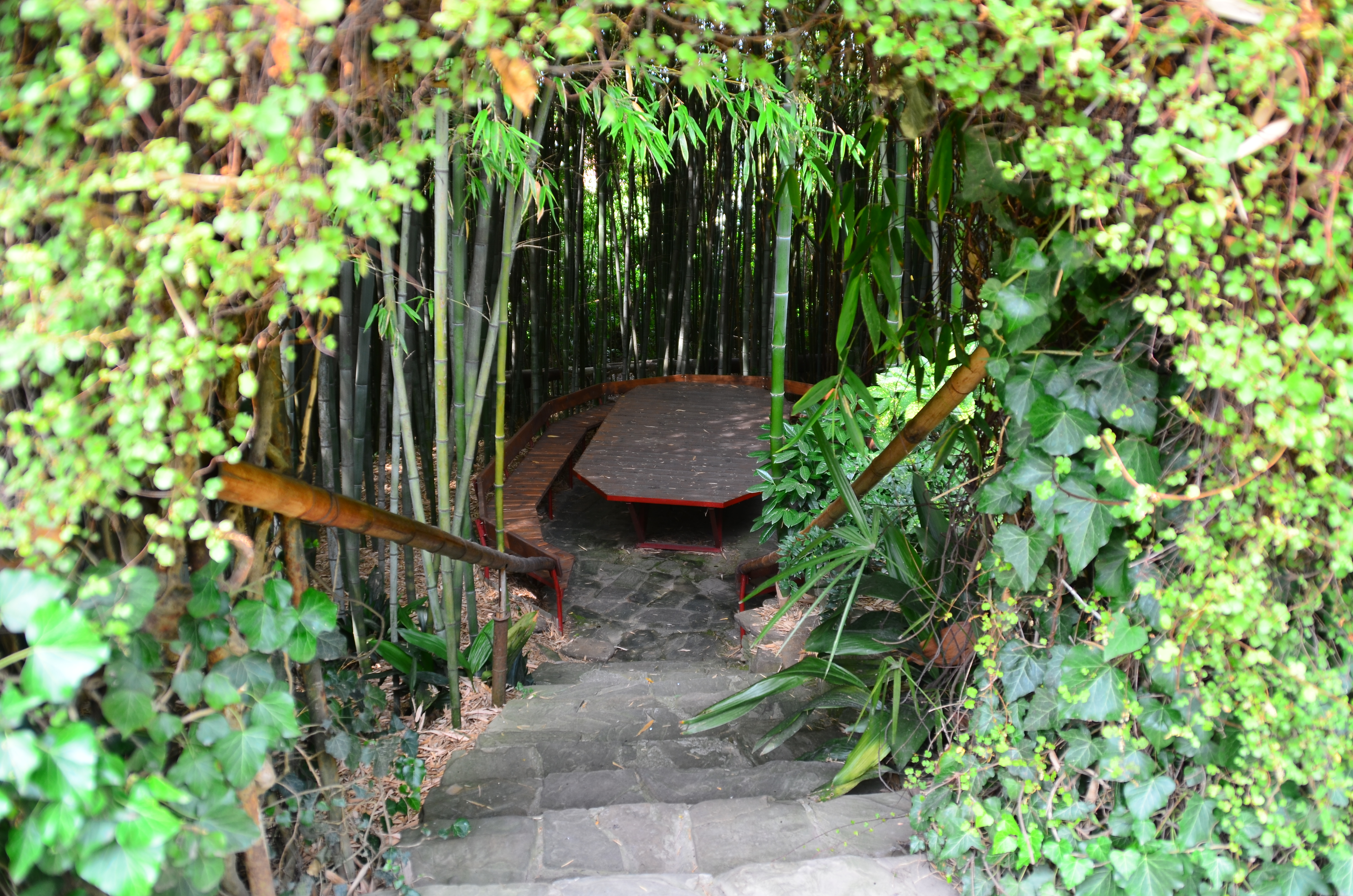
Path in botanical garden to sitting area

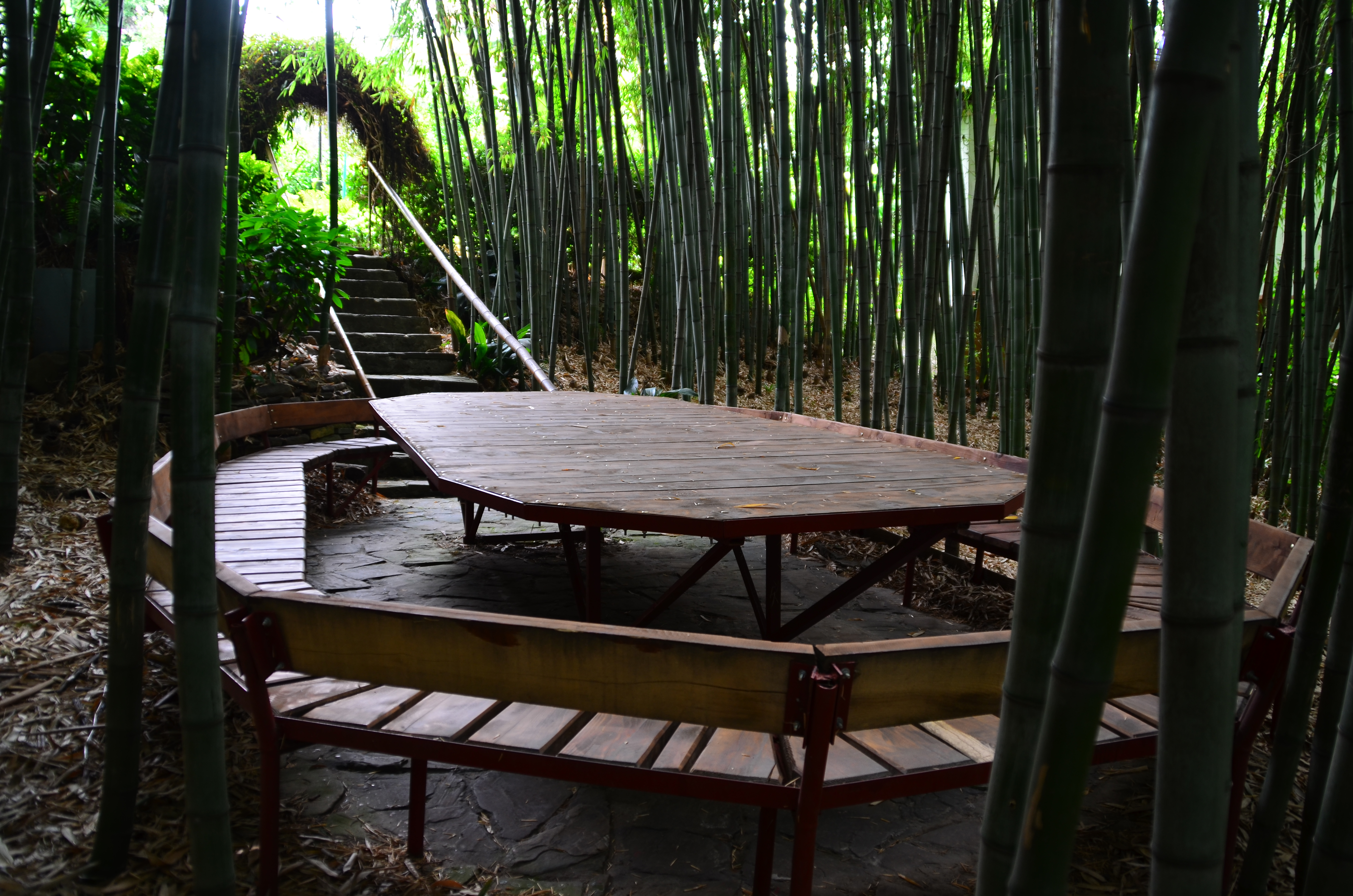
Sitting area lounge

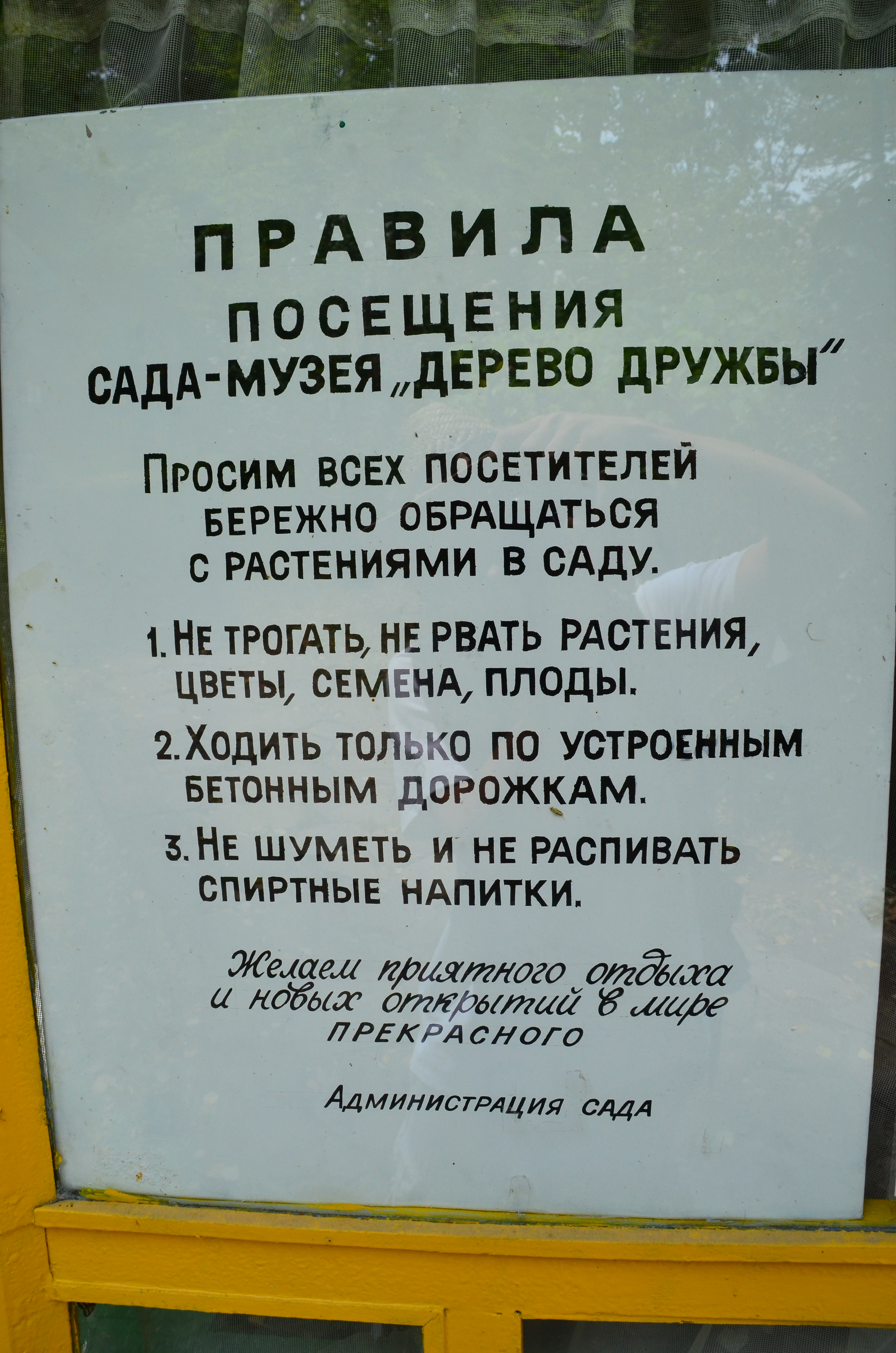
Visitors sign, terms and conditions

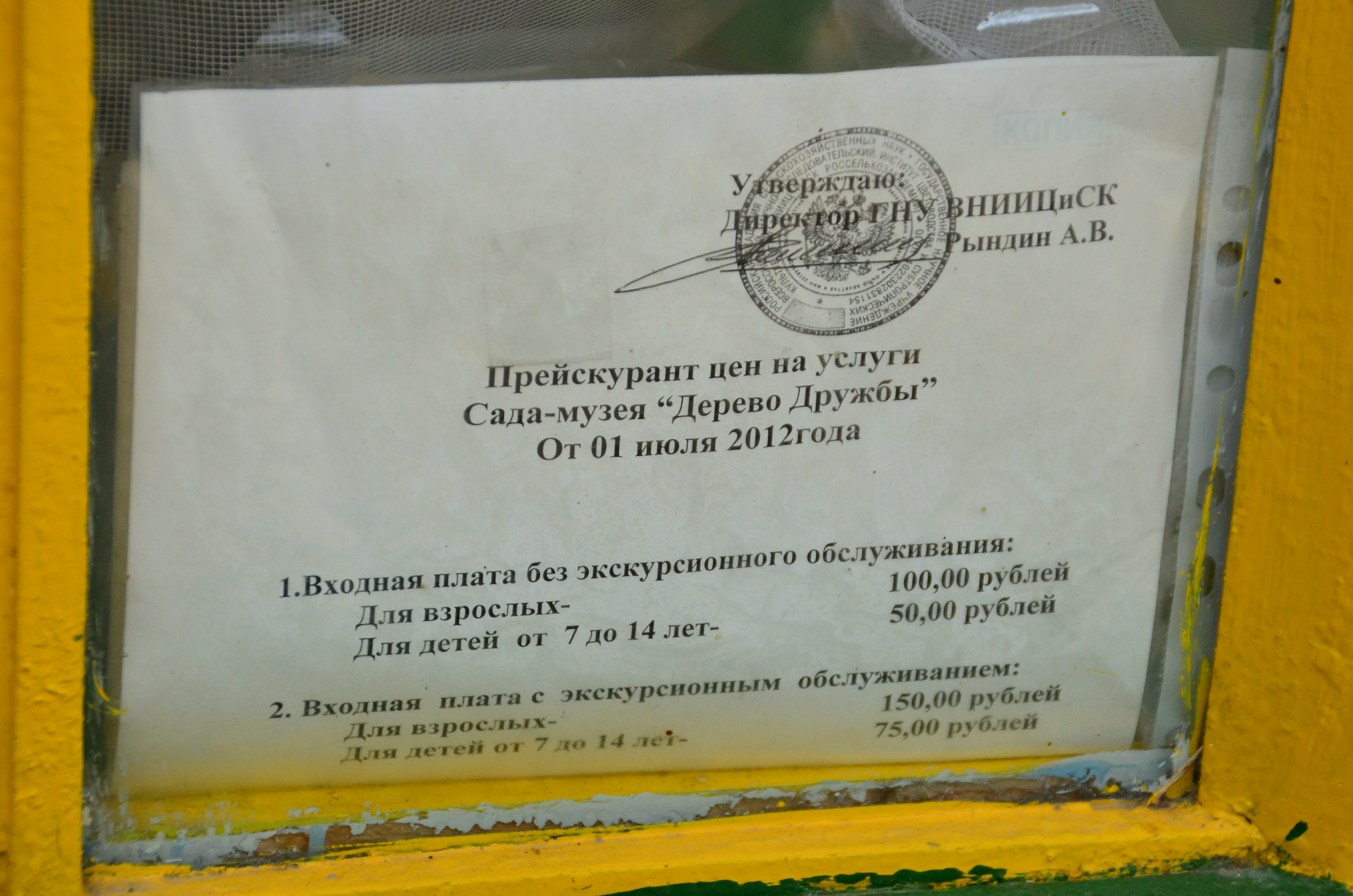
Visitors sign, price-list

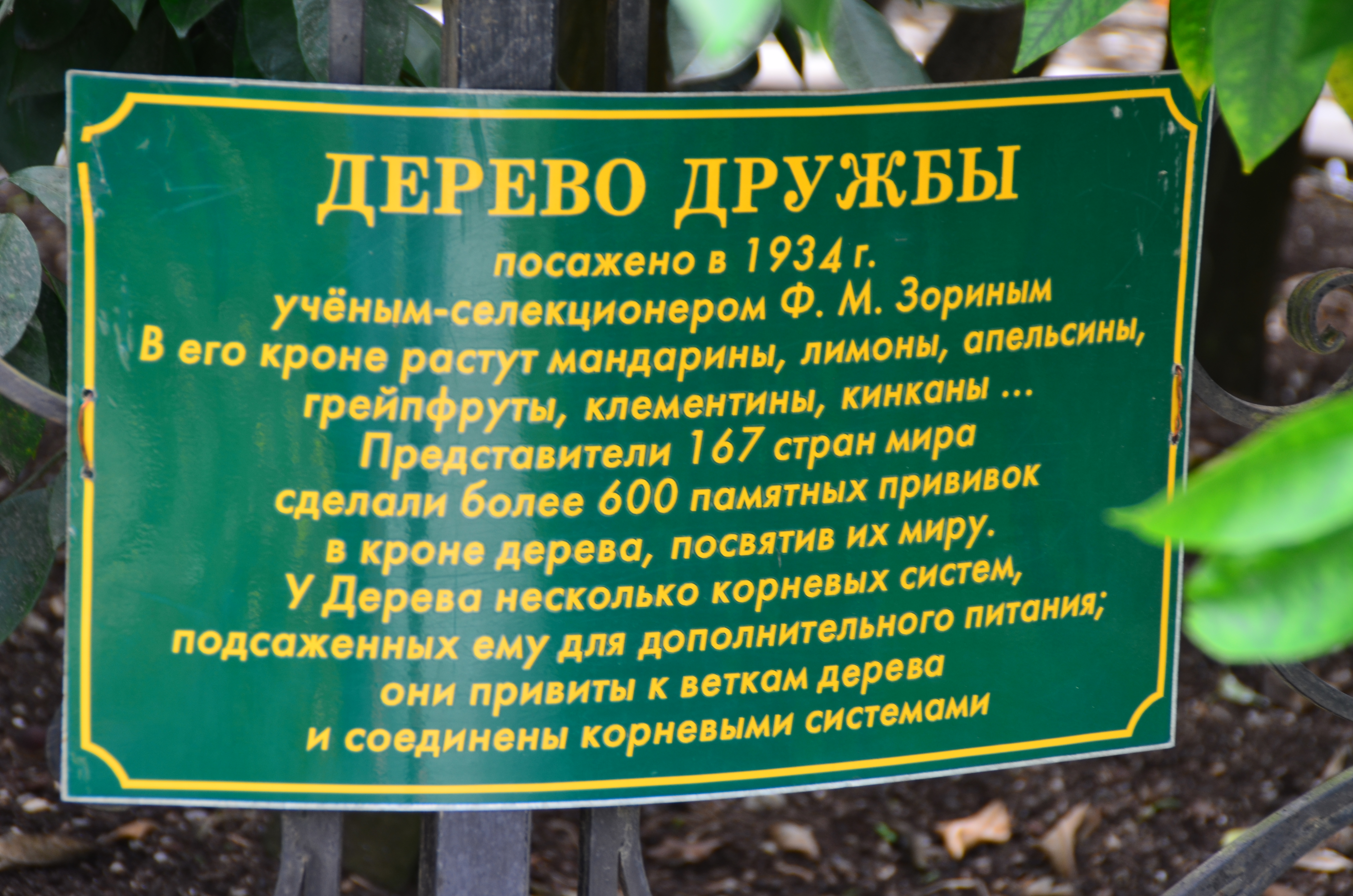
Sign beside the historic Friendship Tree
