= EVS360 Bely Krechet =

Russian train

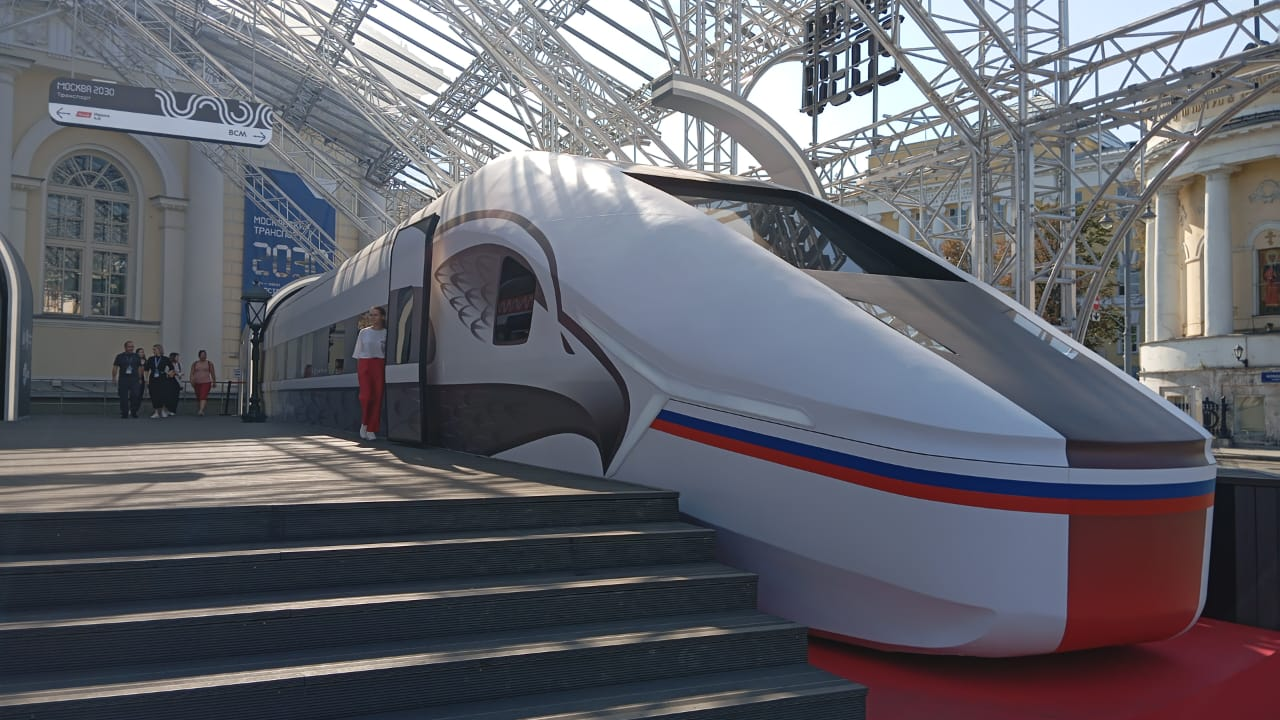
- Presentation of concept design at the "Manezh Station: Moscow Transport 2030" exhibition
- Stock type: Electric multiple unit
- Manufacturers: Ural Locomotives, Verkhnyaya Pyshma
- Designers: Railway Transport Engineering Centre (RZD and Sinara Transport Machines)
- Entered service: 2028 (planned)
- Number under construction: 43 (planned)
- Predecessor: EVS1/EVS2 Sapsan
- Capacity: 454 seats (8 car sets)
- Operator: Russian Railways

Specifications
- Maximum speed: Design (max speed): 400 km/h (250 mph); Design (commercial speed): 360 km/h (220 mph)
- Electric systems: 25 kV 50 Hz AC / 3,000 V DC overhead line
- Current collection: Pantograph
- Track gauge: 1,520 mm (4 ft 11 27/32 in) Russian gauge

The EVS360 Bely Krechet (Russian: ЭВС360 Белый кречет, lit. 'White Gyrfalcon') is a Russian gauge high-speed train under development by Ural Locomotives for use on the future Moscow–Saint Petersburg high-speed railway (VSM-1). The type is planned to enter service in 2028.

== Construction history ==
On 15 February 2024 Sinara Transport Machines announced that it would begin the production of a high speed train for the new Moscow–Saint Petersburg high-speed railway. In March 2024, construction on the line began. Trains will operate at a maximum speed of 360 km/h, while the line is reported to be designed to speeds of 400 km/h

On 15 April 2024 Russian Railways signed a ₽12 billion contract with Ural Locomotives (a subsidiary of Sinara Transport Machines) to produce 2 pre-series trains to be delivered in April 2028.

On 30 August 2024, the State Transport Leasing Company (GTLK) signed an agreement for 41 trainsets at the 'Manezh Station - Moscow Transport 2030' exhibition, which included a mock-up of the design, in Manezhnaya Square, Moscow. In addition to the pre-series trains, it brings the total number of trains on order to 43, to be delivered by 2030.

The implementation of the high speed railway, along with Bely Krechet is planned to be financed through funds from the Russian National Wealth Fund and the Pension and Social Insurance Fund of Russia.

== Branding ==
In line with other trains such as Sokol and Sapsan, 'Bely Krechet' (white gyrfalcon) continues the branding of Russian train designs named after birds.

== See also ==
- Moscow–Saint Petersburg high-speed railway
