= Sinara Group =

Russian investment company (2001)

- Company type: CJSC (Closed joint stock company)
- Founded: 2001
- Headquarters: Yekaterinburg, Russia
- Key people: Mikhail Khodorovsky CEO; Dmitry Alexandrovich Pumpyansky Chairman of the Board
- Website: www.sinara-group.com

Sinara Group is a Russian investment company founded in 2001 with holdings in the property development, rail transportation and financial services sectors. In 2021, Sinara Group had a turnover of US$1.8 billion.

== History ==
The company was founded in 2001, and in 2004 acquired industrial and agricultural companies. In 2006 the group merged with Metallprom. The company division Sinara Transport Machines was formed in 2007, and the division Sinara Development was formed in 2009.

In 2009 Sinara Group and Siemens created a joint venture for the production of twin unit electric locomotive to be based at Sinara's Ural Locomotives near Yekaterinburg. In December 2021, the JV announced production of concept of Lastochka electric train with 200 mm low float in 2025.

== Group divisions and subsidiaries ==
=== Transport engineering and production ===
The group division ОАО "Синара – Транспортные машины" (Open joint stock company 'Sinara - transport machines') (STM) is based in Yekaterinburg and comprises ОАО "Уральский завод железнодорожного" (JSC Ural locomotive factory) in Verkhnyaya Pyshma, the ОАО "Людиновский тепловозостроительный завод" (Lyudinovsky locomotive factory) in Lyudinovo, the ООО "Уральский дизель-моторный завод" (Ural diesel engine factory Ltd.) and the ООО "Центр инновационного развития СТМ" (STM research centre) in Yekaterinburg.

=== Property development ===
The group division "Синара – Девелопмент" (Sinara - development) includes ООО "фирма КОМ-БИЛДИНГ" (COM-Building company) based in Volgograd, КОТ Новокольцовский (Novokoltsovsky development); a 600ha residential, commercial and industrial development near Yekaterinburg, the ОАО "Архыз-Синара" in Karachay–Cherkessia, the ОАО "Центральный стадион" (Central Stadium company) in Yekaterinburg; a sports arena development, and ЗАО "Интурист-Синара" (Intourist-Sinara); a joint venture with Intourist headquartered in Moscow.

=== Financial services ===
The financial services division includes the ООО "СИНАРА-ИНВЕСТ" (Sinara invest) and ОАО "СКБ-банк" (SKB-Bank), both in Yekaterinburg.

In September 2021, Sinara Financial Corporation (an integral part of Sinara Group) bought Think Wealth Ltd, an investment company registered in Cyprus, already renamed in Sinara Financial Corporation (Europe), which is focused on consulting, broker services, trust management, high-frequency trading and others.

=== Other business areas ===
The group has holdings in the agricultural business area via ОАО "Каменское", hotels and tourism via ОАО "Пансионат отдыха Бургас" based in Sochi, and energy business via ЗАО "Синэрго" in Yekaterinburg.

In December 2021, Gazprombank confirmed selling of 99,9% of "Kriogaz" LLC, business operator of technical gases, to "Sinara Group" in the first quarter of 2022 within ESG strategy of the buyer. The deal was closed in February 2022.

== Revenue ==
By the end of 2022, the revenue of the Sinara group increased to 8.36 billion rubles (in 2021 — 2.85 billion rubles). Net profit amounted to 9.65 billion rubles (an increase of 132% compared to last year). Revenues from participation in other organisations increased to 10.9 billion rubles (in 2021 — 1.3 billion rubles). The cost of sales of the group amounted to 3.49 billion rubles (1.65 billion rubles in 2021).

== See also ==
- Transmashholding, Russian railway industry group
