= Moscow–Saint Petersburg high-speed railway =

High-speed rail system in Russia

Overview
- Termini: Moscow-Leningradsky; St. Petersburg-Moskovsky
- Stations: 16

Service
- Type: High-speed rail

History
- Planned opening: 1 April 2028

Technical
- Line length: 679 km (422 mi)
- Track gauge: 1,520 mm (4 ft 11 27/32 in) Russian gauge
- Electrification: Overhead line: 25 kV 50 Hz AC; 3 kV DC
- Operating speed: 360 km/h (220 mph)

The Moscow–Saint Petersburg high-speed railway (Russian: Высокоскоростная магистраль Москва — Санкт-Петербург), also known as VSM-1 (Russian: ВСМ-1) is a high-speed rail line under construction in Russia.

== History ==
In 2020, Russian Railways reported construction was scheduled to begin in 2021. The estimated travel time was 2 hours 19 minutes, and the length of the line would be 679 km.

In November 2021, reports suggested it was likely for the project to be abandoned favouring possible upgrades to the existing Saint Petersburg-Moscow railway.

In August 2023, president Vladimir Putin announced his support for taking the project forward, as well as making progress towards Nizhny Novgorod, Voronezh and Kazan.

On December 15, 2023, the Russian minister of transport, Vitaly Savelyev, said that they have formed the main parameters of implementation and developed a financial and organizational model.

Estimates placed cost more than ₽2.3 trillion ($25.97 billion), and will be built by VSM Two Capitals LLC (VSM Dve Stolitsy), a Russian company, using both government and private funds, under concession. The Russian government plans to allocate more than ₽300 billion from the National Welfare Fund at 1% in 2025, and ₽328 billion in subsidies in the period between 2024 and 2038. In total, it is estimated ₽580 billion will need to be allocated form the National Wealth Fund, with the remaining amount coming from sources such as VTB, Sberbank and Gazprombank.

Sberbank arranged two syndicated loans, involving VTB (providing ₽400 billion) and Sovcombank, for the construction of the new line and the rolling stock. The line is expected to cost ₽1.788 trillion ($16.55 billion) to build.

President Vladimir Putin gave the go-ahead for construction in March 2024. Construction is planned to begin in the summer of 2025, with the line opening for service on 1 April 2028.

== Route ==
The line was planned to be 679 km long, and will serve 16 stations (including 4 intermediate stations within Moscow).

The planned stations as of 2024 are, in Moscow: Moscow-Leningradsky, Rizhskaya and Petrovsko-Razumovskaya, in Moscow Oblast: Zelenograd-Kryukovo and Vysokovo, in Tver Oblast: New Tver, Logovezh and Vypolzovo, in Novgorod Oblast: Valday, Gorki, Veliky Novgorod and Tigoda, in Leningrad Oblast: Zharovskaya, and in Saint Petersburg: Obukhovo-2 and Moskovsky railway station.

== Operation ==
Trains will operate at a maximum speed of 360 km/h, while the line is reported to be designed to handle speeds of 400 km/h.

The line is estimated to cut travel time between Moscow and St Petersburg to 2 hours 15 minutes, running at 15-20 minute headways, later increasing in frequency to 10–15 minutes by 2030.

== Rolling stock ==
Bely Krechet
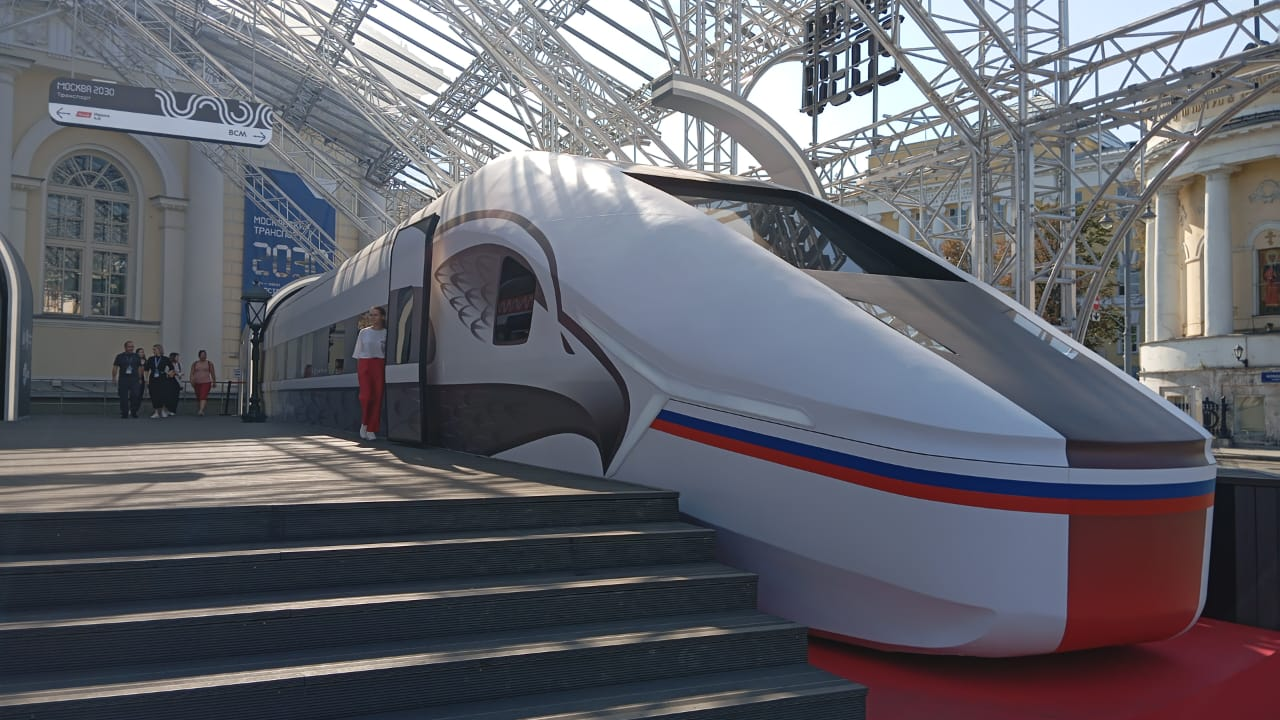
- Presentation of concept design at the "Manezh Station: Moscow Transport 2030" exhibition
- Stock type: Electric multiple unit
- Manufacturer: Ural Locomotives
- Designers: Railway Transport Engineering Centre (RZD and Sinara Transport Machines)
- Assembly: Verkhnyaya Pyshma, Sverdlovsk Oblast, Russia
- Entered service: 2028 (planned)
- Number under construction: 43 (planned)
- Capacity: 454 seats (8 car sets)

Specifications
- Maximum speed: Design (max speed): 400 km/h (250 mph); Design (commercial speed): 360 km/h (220 mph)
- Electric systems: 25 kV 50 Hz AC / 3,000 V DC overhead line
- Current collection: Pantograph
- Track gauge: 1,520 mm (4 ft 11 27/32 in) Russian gauge

The rolling stock is being produced by Sinara, which in a joint venture with Siemens, produced the Velaro RUS (Sapsan) and Desiro RUS (Lastochka) trains. A previous partnership to produce high speed trains with Siemens was dissolved due to Russia's invasion of Ukraine, following which Siemens exited the Russian market and the joint venture.

In April 2024, a ₽12 billion ($119.6 million) contract was signed with Ural Locomotives (a subsidiary of Sinara Group) to produce 2 pre-series trains. The trains will be 8 cars long, with a design speed of 400 km/h, and a maximum operational speed of 360 km/h.

In September 2024, an agreement for 41 trainsets was signed by GTLK, a Russian state lessor, and VSM Two Capitals LLC, the concessionaire, at the 'Manezh Station - Moscow Transport 2030' exhibition, which included a mock-up of the design, in Manezhnaya Square, Moscow. In addition to the pre-series trains, it brings the total number of trains on order to 43, to be delivered by 2030.

They will be branded as 'Bely Krechet' (white gyrfalcon) trains, alongside other Russian train designs named after birds.

The trains will be composed of 8 or 16 cars, with 4 classes of seating and a bistro car. 8 car trains will have 454 seats (21 first, 68 business, 135 standard, and 230 'comfort' seats). They will be designed for operating temperatures ranging from -40 to +40°C. Designs are to be finalised by Q1 2026, with the first prototype built by 2027, and certified by 2028.

The train will be tested on a section of the line under construction between Moscow and Tver.

== See also ==
- Saint Petersburg–Moscow railway
- High-speed rail in Russia
