= 2ES10 =

Russian locomotive

"Granite" 2ES10 "ГРАНИТ" (2ЭС10)
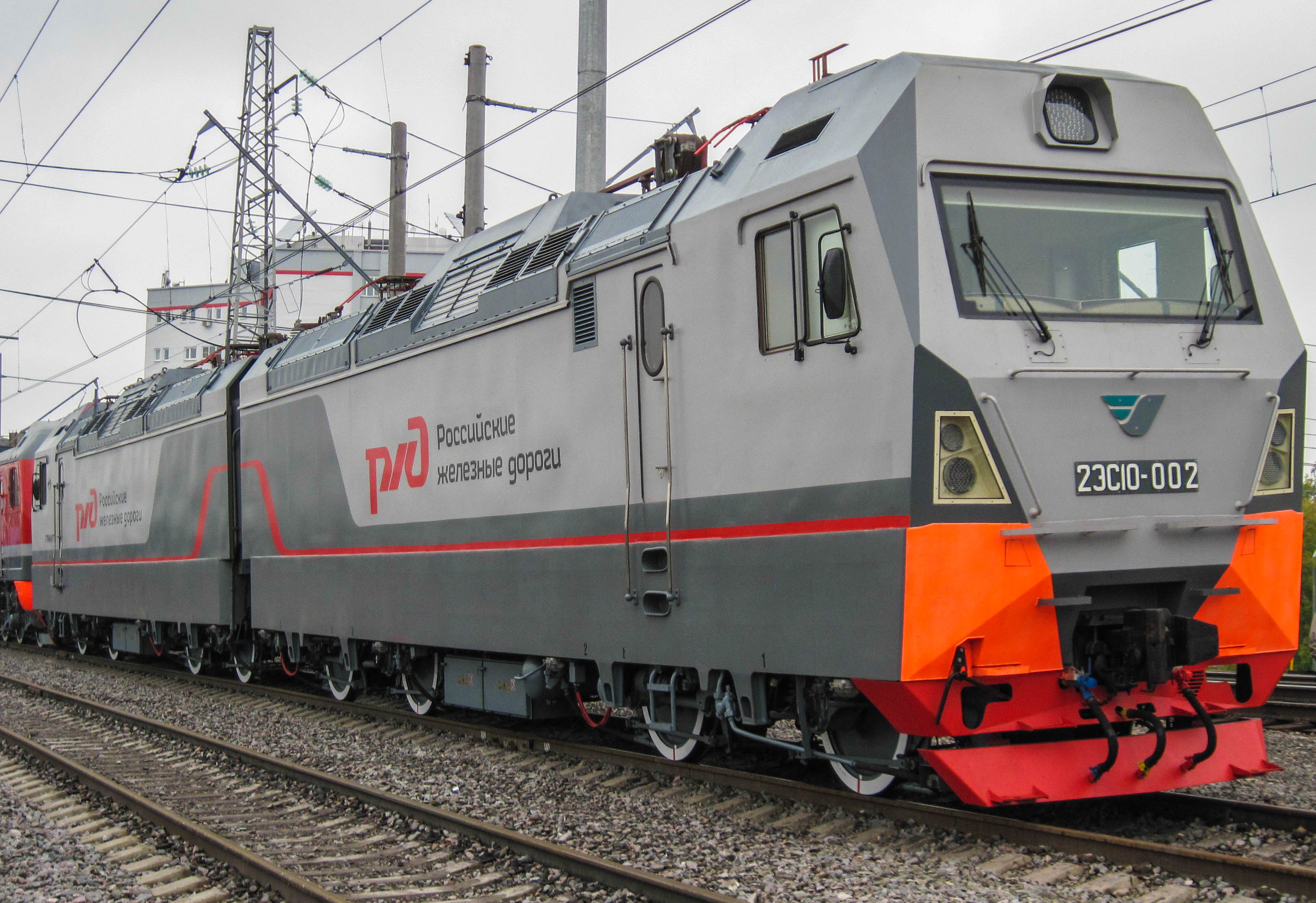
Type and origin
- Power type: Electric
- Builder: Ural Locomotives (Уральские локомотивы)
- Order number: 221+1
- Build date: 2010-
- Total produced: 140 (January 2017)
Specifications
- Configuration
  - UIC: 2(Bo'Bo')
- Gauge: 1,520 mm (4 ft 11 27/32 in) Russian gauge
- Wheel diameter: 1,250 mm (49.2 in)
- Length: 34 m (111 ft 7 in) (over couplers)
- Axle load: 24.9 t (24.5 long tons; 27.4 short tons) (245+/-4.9kN)
- Loco weight: 190–202 t (187–199 long tons; 209–223 short tons)
- Electric system/s: 3 kV DC Catenary
- Current pickup: Pantograph
- Traction motors: nose suspended
- MU working: up to four sections
- Loco brake: 8,400 kW (11,300 hp) Regenerative; 5,600 kW (7,500 hp) Resistive (max.); Mechanical pneumatic
Performance figures
- Maximum speed: 120 km/h (75 mph)
- Power output
  - 1 hour: 8,800 kW (11,800 hp) short-time
  - Continuous: 8,400 kW (11,300 hp)
- Tractive effort: starting: 784 kN (176,000 lb_{f}) continuous: 538 kN (121,000 lb_{f}) @ 55 km/h (15 m/s); 370 kN (83,000 lb_{f}) @ 120 km/h (33 m/s)
- Sources: except where noted

The 2ES10 is a twin section electric locomotive manufactured from 2010 by Ural Locomotives, also known as the "Granite". RZD ordered 221 units in 2010. Ukrainian Railways ordered 50 units in 2013. These units are primarily used to pull freight trains.

== Design ==
The 2ES10 is a two-unit eight-axle electric freight locomotive manufactured for RZD by Ural Locomotives, a joint venture between Sinara Group of Russia (base platform and auxiliary equipment) and Siemens of Germany (traction electrical equipment). It is also known as the "Granite".

The 2ES10 offers double the power output of VL11 locomotives, with lower operating and maintenance costs. During trials in August 2010, a three-section 2ES10 hauled a 9,000-tonne (8,900-long-ton; 9,900-short-ton) train across the Urals.

== History ==
In May 2010, Russian Railways signed an order for 221 2ES10 locomotives. The first prototype locomotive was presented 18 November 2010.

In 2012 the company JSC "Apatite" (ОАО "Апатит") acquired one locomotive, 2ES10-222.

In 2013 Ukrainian Railways sign an agreement to lease 50 2ES10 units as part of a larger 350-locomotive order; the first unit was delivered in Dec. 2013.
