= Lastochka =

German/Russian commuter intercity electric train

ES1 / ES1P / ES2G / ES2GP / ES104 / ES105 / ES105P Lastochka/Finist
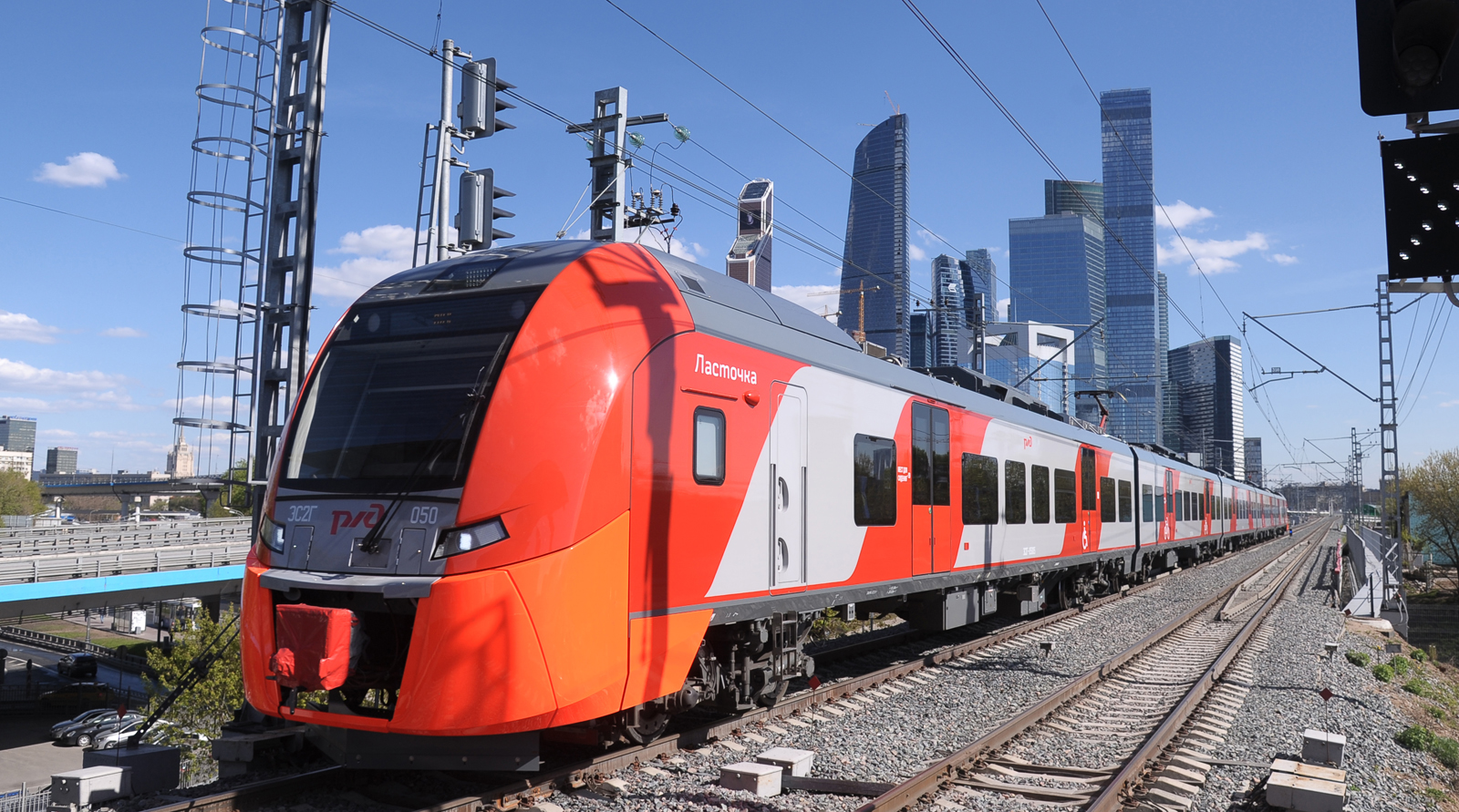
- ES2G Lastochka
- In service: 2013–present
- Manufacturer: Siemens / Ural Locomotives
- Family name: Siemens Desiro
- Number built: As of July 2023 Trainsets: ES1: 54; ES1P: 47; ES2G: 164; ES2GP: 17; ES104: 7 Cars: ES1: 270; ES1P: 250; ES2G: 938; ES2GP: 85; ES104: 35
- Formation: 5-6-7-8-10 cars (train set); 10-20 cars (multiple working)
- Capacity: ES1 (suburban): 449; ES1 Premium (intercity): 340; ES2G (suburban): 386; ES2G (city-urban): 346; ES2GP (intercity): 326; ES1P (intercity): 326; ES104: 416; ES105: 386; ES105P: 311
- Operator: Russian Railways
- Lines served: Moscow Railway; North Caucasus Railway; Gorky Railway; Sverdlovsk Railway; October Railway; Moscow Central Circle

Specifications
- Car body construction: Aluminium alloy
- Car length: 26.031 m (85 ft 4.8 in) (end car); 24.8 m (81 ft 4 in) (intermediate car)
- Width: 3.48 m (11 ft 5 in)
- Height: 4.4 m (14 ft 5 1/4 in)
- Floor height: 1.4 m (55.12 in)
- Platform height: 1,100 mm (43.3 in) / 200 mm (7.9 in) (ES1); 1,400 mm (55.1 in) (ES2G)
- Doors: 2 per side
- Maximum speed: 140 km/h (87 mph) - 160 km/h (99 mph)
- Weight: ES1: 264,000 kg (582,000 lb) (5 cars, train set); ES2G: 260,200 kg (573,600 lb) (5 cars, train set)
- Power output: ES1: 2,550 kW (3,420 hp); ES2G: 2,932 kW (3,932 hp)
- Tractive effort: 328 kN (74,000 lb_{f}) (starting); 296 kN (67,000 lb_{f}) at 97 km/h (60 mph) (continuous)
- Acceleration: 0.64 m/s^{2} (1.4 mph/s)
- Power supply: (At the traction motors?)
- Electric systems: ES1, ES1P, ES105, ES105P: 25 kV 50 Hz AC and 3 kV DC catenary; ES2G, ES2GP, ES104: 3 kV DC catenary
- Current collection: Pantograph
- UIC classification: Bo′Bo′+2′2′+2′2′+2′2′+Bo′Bo′ (train set); 2×(Bo′Bo′+2′2′+2′2′+2′2′+Bo′Bo′) (multiple working)
- Safety system: KLUB-U
- Multiple working: Yes (2 train sets)
- Track gauge: 1,520 mm (4 ft 11 27/32 in) Russian gauge

The Lastochka/Finist (Russian: Ласточка/Финист, lit. 'Swallow') is a German/Russian commuter intercity electric multiple unit train used across multiple Russian cities, based on the Siemens Desiro design and manufactured by Siemens and Ural Locomotives.

== History ==
In 2009, Russian Railways commissioned Siemens to develop a suburban dual-system electric train adapted to Russian conditions. The new trains were planned to be used in Sochi for suburban passenger traffic during the 2014 Winter Olympics and then to be partially transferred to other train lines with non-stop service routes.

Previously, Siemens had already produced dual-system Sapsan trains (Velaro RUS) for Russian Railways. The design of the new electric train was based on the five-car Siemens Desiro ML electric train. On 29 December 2009, Russian Railways signed a contract with the German company Siemens for the production of 54 Siemens Desiro RUS electric trains worth €410 million.

The trains received the ES1 (Russian: ЭС1 (Электропоезд Сименс мод.1), lit. 'EMU Siemens 1 model') series designation and were branded as Lastochka. All 54 trains were manufactured in Germany.

In March 2022, after Russia invaded Ukraine, Siemens put all new business and international deliveries in Russia and Belarus on hold. In June 2022 Siemens Chief Executive Officer Roland Busch condemned the war in Ukraine and announced that the company had decided to wind down its industrial business activities in Russia. In line with the requirement of Russian Railways for "technology transfer", most components for Lastochka can now be locally sourced, with over 80% of the latest trains being Russian made.

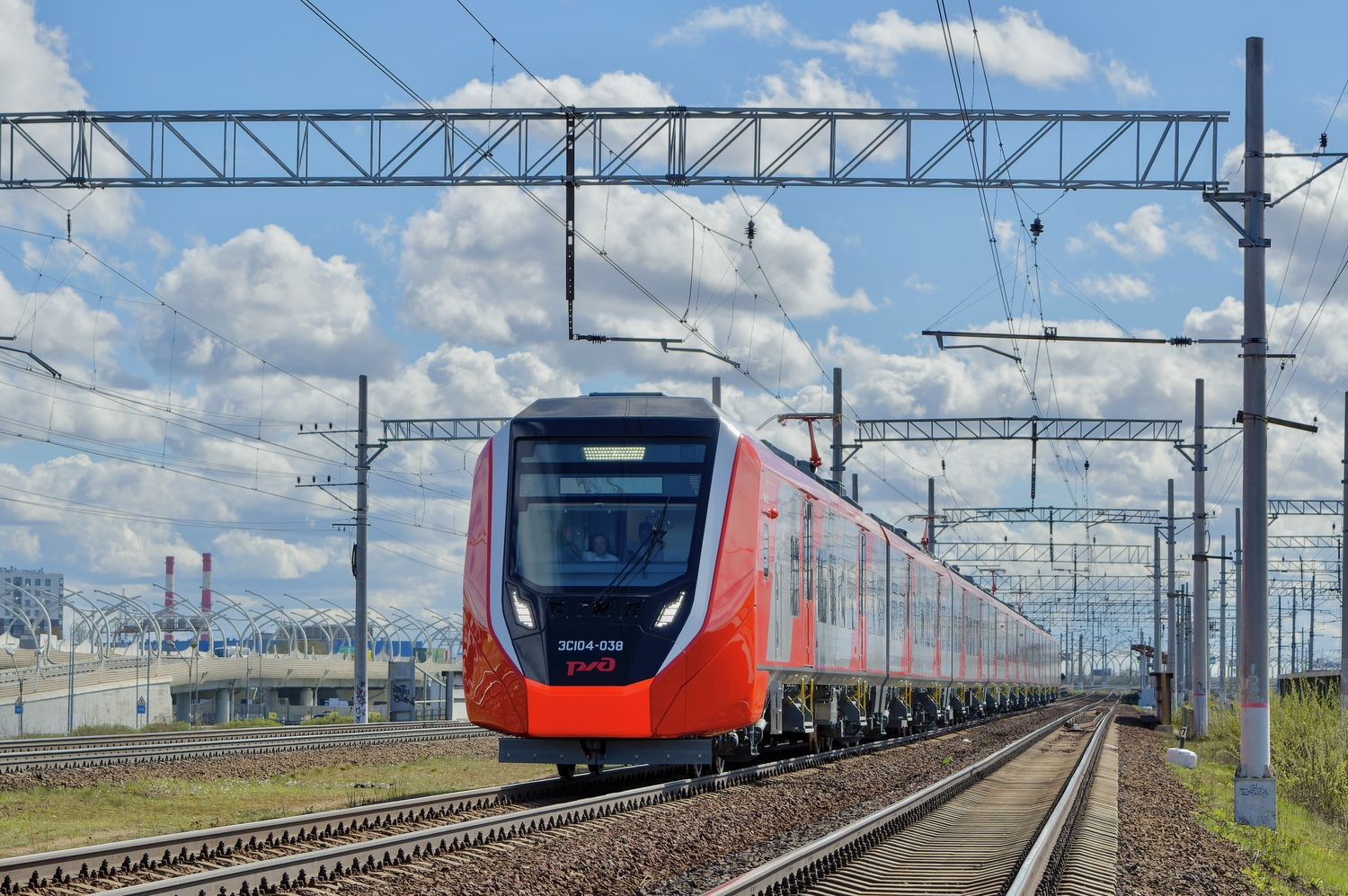
New Russian EMU - ES104 Finist

Since 2023, the Sinara Group has been implementing its own new project (based on Siemens Desiro technical solutions) - electric train ES104 under the former commercial name "Lastochka" (now "Finist").

== Train design ==
Dual-system trains with automatic system transfer were the ideal solution for amalgamating pre-existing railway lines in the region of the Olympic Games. There, the main railway network operating in flat terrain along the coast of the Black Sea had been electrified with direct current at 3 kV, while the lines built in the mountainous section of Adler – Krasnaya Polyana had been electrified with AC voltage at 25 kV, 50 Hz, appropriate for the steep gradients, and hence much higher power demands. Dual-system electric trains allow commuter rail routes covering sections of both DC and AC track with no need to stop at places where the electric power changes. With the technology, the trains are able to run directly from Adler to Krasnodar without stopping at the Goryachiy Klyuch changeover station.

All technical solutions adopted by Siemens in the design of the new Desiro ML RUS electric trains were discussed with experts from specialized research institutes and were approved by Russian Railways. Siemens consulted many Russian experts in high-speed railways—especially those involved in the Velaro RUS high-speed trains construction—for the design decisions concerning the Desiro ML train design and construction.

In particular, the base platform of the Desiro ML train had to be adapted to the Russian gauge of 1,520 mm and the demands of the harsh Russian winter. The topographical conditions in the region of the Olympic Games present higher requirements for automated systems and traction equipment. The design and construction efforts were focused particularly on the head car of the train.

In March 2011, LLC Ural Locomotives—a joint venture of Siemens AG and Sinara Group—and LLC Aeroexpress formed a joint venture to manufacture electric trains in Russia at the Ural Locomotives plant in Verkhnyaya Pyshma (Sverdlovsk Oblast). Production started in late 2013 with the aim of producing around 200 train carriages per year for Russian Railways. By 2017, 80 percent of the production of these trains is expected to be localized in Russia.

On 7 September 2011, Russian Railways placed an order for up to 1,200 Desiro RUS train carriages. The contract was signed by the President of Russian Railways Vladimir Yakunin, Siemens CEO and Chairman of the Management Board Peter Löscher, and President of Sinara Group Dmitry Pumpyansky at the international railway business forum Expo 1520 in Shcherbinka.

Russian Railways also has a maintenance contract with Siemens for 54 trains, ordered in 2009 and 2010. The contract with a value exceeding 500 € million was signed by Vladimir Yakunin and Peter Löscher and came into force in 2013 for a period of 40 years.

On 11 November 2013, Ural Locomotives started manufacturing a new model developed for 3 kV-only routes with the interior designed for city lines. It was designated as ES2G (Russian: ЭС2Г (Электропоезд Сименс мод.2 городской), lit. 'EMU Siemens second model cityline'). In 2014, manufacturing ES1 on Siemens factory was finished. On the third quarter of 2016 ES2G started their work on MCC, earlier and now they are working as suburban trains on Moscow–Tver line (Moscow–Zelenograd and Moscow–Tver) and on Yekaterinburg suburban lines. In August 2017, 72 trains were produced.

In March 2016, Ural Locomotives transferred to RZD a new train designated as ES2GP (Russian: ЭС2ГП (Электропоезд Сименс мод.2 городской повышенной комфортности), lit. 'EMU Siemens second model cityline increased comfort'), which is technically similar to ES2G, but designed for intercity lines and has not only standard 3rd-class seats like ES2G, but also 1st- and 2nd-class seats. In March 2017 train have only trial runs.

== Lines ==
=== Operating ===
==== Northwestern Russia ====
- St. Petersburg – Moscow
- St. Petersburg – Novgorod
- St. Petersburg – Valday
- St. Petersburg – Staraya Russa
- St. Petersburg – Petrozavodsk
- St. Petersburg – Sortavala
- St. Petersburg – Ruskeala
- St. Petersburg – Volkhov
- St. Petersburg – Vyborg
- St. Petersburg – Pskov
- St. Petersburg – Kalishe
- St. Petersburg – Oranienbaum
- St. Petersburg – Luga
- St. Petersburg – Pechory
- St. Petersburg – Tikhvin
- St. Petersburg – Kuznechnoye
- St. Petersburg – Sosnovo
- St. Petersburg – Tosno
- Petrozavodsk – Pskov

==== Moscow ====
- Moscow Central Circle
- Moscow – Nizhny Novgorod
- Moscow – Kursk
- Moscow – Oryol
- Moscow – Konakovo
- Moscow – Smolensk
- Moscow – Tver
- Moscow – Zelenograd
- Moscow – Ivanovo
- Moscow – Kostroma

==== South Russia ====
- Krasnodar – Adler
- Krasnodar – Rostov-on-Don
- Novorossiysk – Rostov-on-Don
- Maikop – Adler
- Sochi – Sochi International Airport
- Sochi – Roza Khutor
- Sochi – Olympic Park
- Tuapse – Olympic Park
- Tuapse – Sochi International Airport
- Lazarevskaya – Sochi International Airport
- Dagomys – Sochi International Airport

==== Urals ====
- Yekaterinburg – Nizhny Tagil
- Yekaterinburg – Kamensk-Uralsky
- Yekaterinburg – Pervouralsk – Kuzino

=== Planned ===
- Mineralnye Vody – Sochi
- Barnaul – Novosibirsk

== See also ==
- Sapsan
- Allegro
- Strizh
