= Siemens Desiro =

Family of diesel and electric multiple units from Siemens

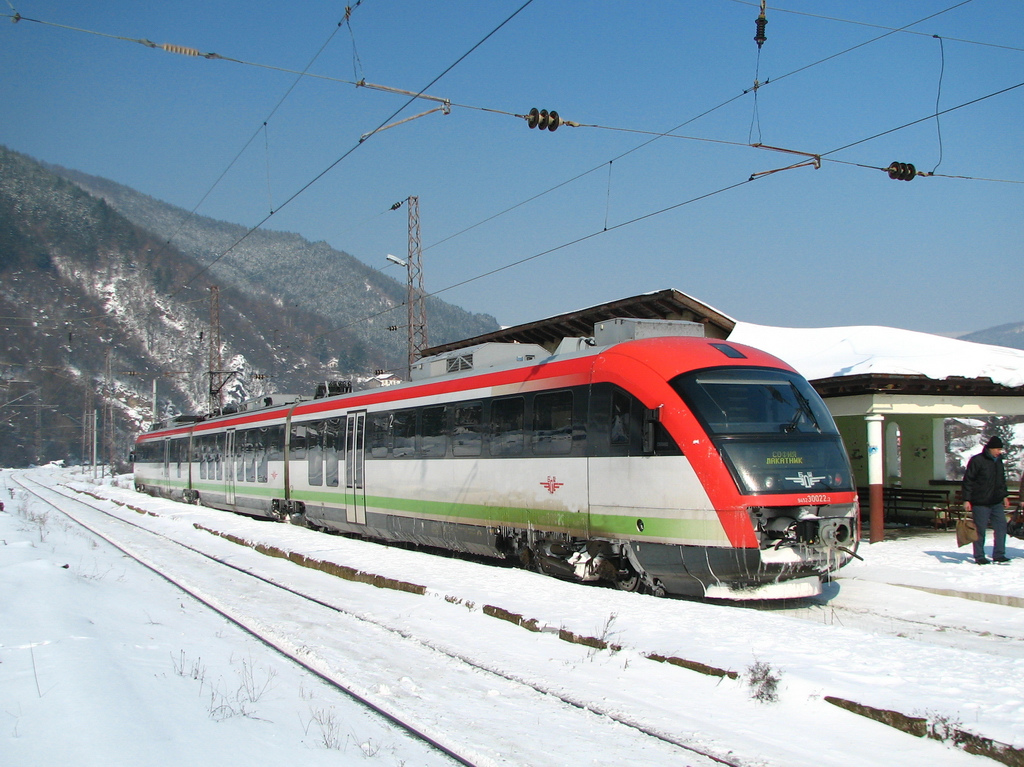
- Desiro on the Sofia-Lakatnik line, 2012
- Stock type: Multiple unit
- Manufacturers: Siemens Mobility, Ural Locomotives

Specifications
- Maximum speed: United Kingdom: 177 km/h (110 mph); Majority: 160 km/h (100 mph)
- Track gauge: 1,435 mm (4 ft 8 1/2 in) standard gauge

The Siemens Desiro (/ˈdɛziroʊ/, /dɛˈziːroʊ/, German pronunciation: [ˈdɛziʁoː]) is a family of diesel or electric multiple unit passenger trains developed by Siemens Mobility, a division of the German Siemens AG conglomerate. The main variants are the Desiro Classic, Desiro ML, Desiro UK and the later Desiro City, Desiro HC and Desiro RUS. The trains are mostly used for commuter and regional services, and their rapid acceleration makes them suitable for services with short distances between stations. The design is flexible, and has become common in many European countries. The trainsets have modern equipment such as toilet waste retention tanks, ergonomic seats, and automated information displays with spoken announcements.

== Desiro Classic ==
=== Austria ===
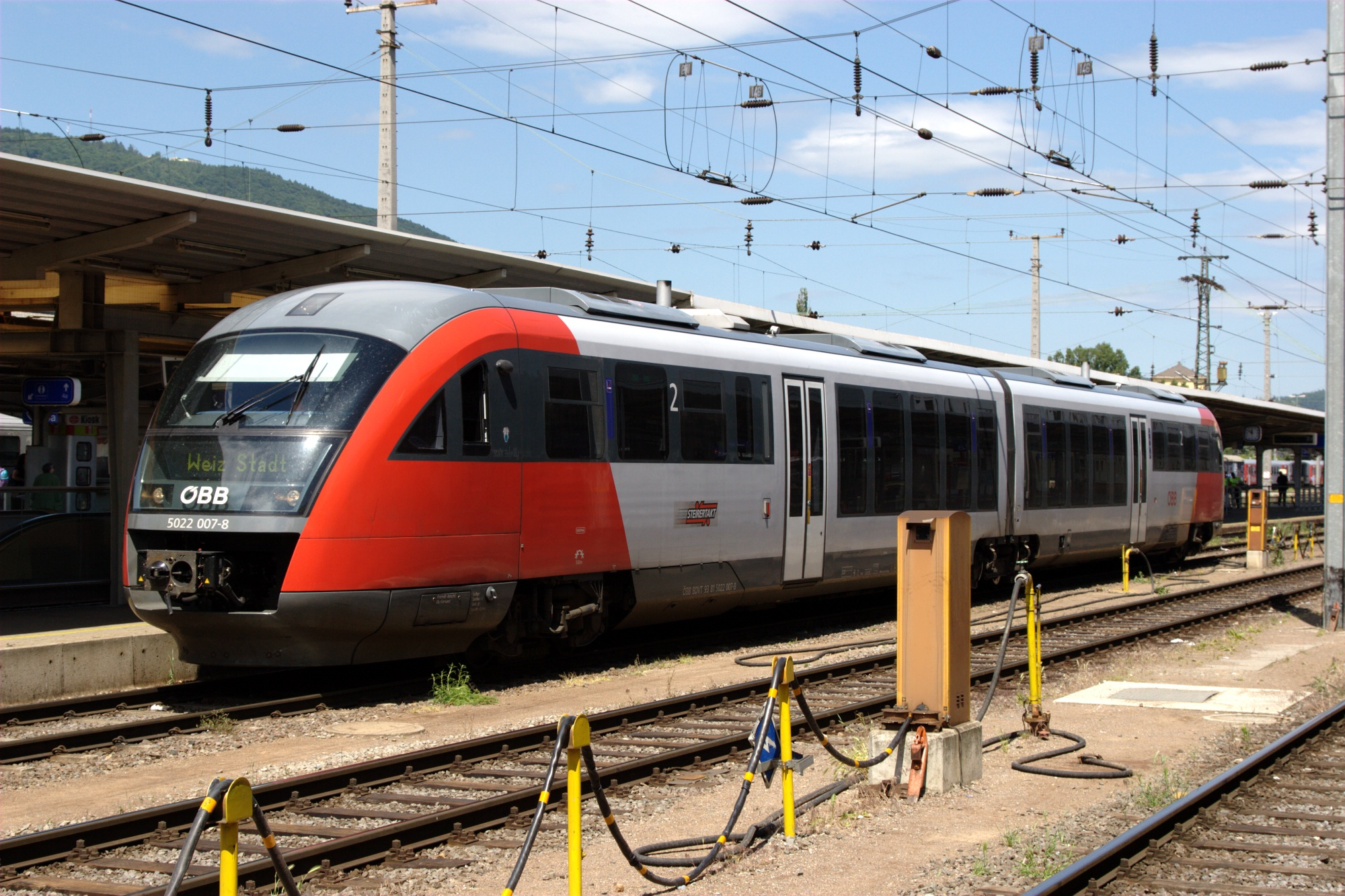
ÖBB Class 5022 in Graz, Austria

Austrian Federal Railways (ÖBB) is using 60 diesel-powered Desiro trains designated as ÖBB 5022. These are based on the Class 642 used by Deutsche Bahn, but have some additional safety equipment.

=== Bulgaria ===
In 2005 and 2006, the Bulgarian State Railways began operating Desiro trains as part of a €67 million deal with Siemens AG for a total of 25 Diesel multiple units. As of 22 March 2006, 16 trains had been delivered, with many of them operating on the Sofia-Kyustendil-Sofia line. Another €117 million deal for 25 EMUs has also been signed with Siemens AG. The EMUs were fitted out in Varna, where BDZ and Siemens AG are intending to establish a joint venture company. The EMUs are designated classes 30 and 31 and are servicing traffic in the Sofia and Plovdiv areas.

=== Czech Republic ===
Private railway company Arriva vlaky operates with two Desiro trains borrowed from Deutsche Bahn (DB).

=== Denmark ===
In Denmark, DSB has rented 12 Desiro trains since 2002. The trains were originally used between Odense and Svendborg and between Odense and Fredericia, although they were later moved to service on the Little South Line. On 2 July 2009 DSB signed a contract for eight trains from Siemens for Grenaabanen, with an option for 92 more. The trains entered service on 12 December 2010, also servicing Odderbanen from December 2012. Grenaabanen and Odderbanen shut in 2016 for their re-purposing for a light rail network in Aarhus and its satellite towns. The trainsets were moved to Svendborgbanen, whose rolling stock was in turn moved to Lille Syd.

Nordjyske Jernbaner used Desiro trains since 2004 on all its operations. Today the company owns eight Desiro trains.

=== Germany ===
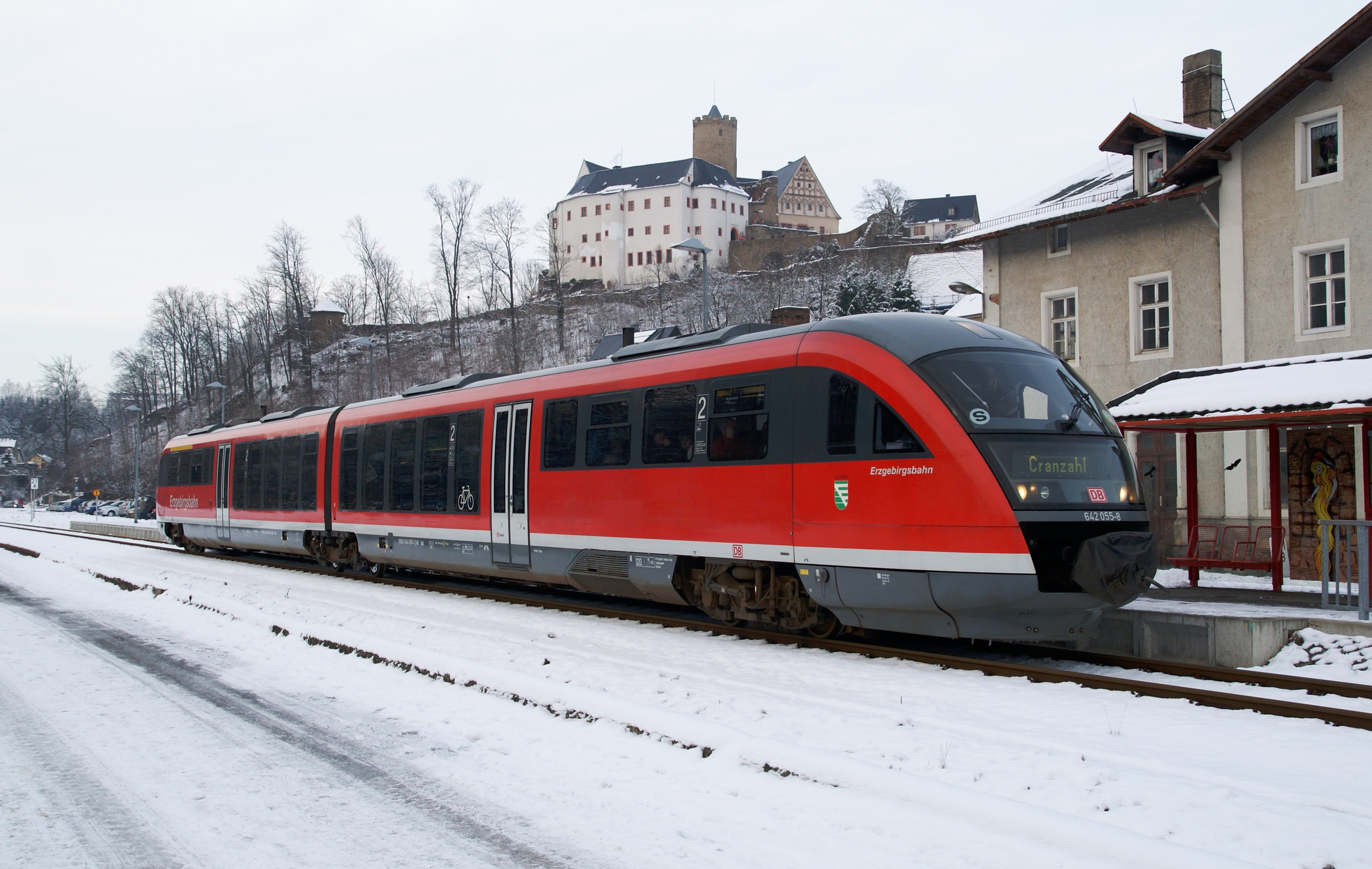
DB Class 642 in Germany

Germany's Deutsche Bahn introduced two-car Desiro DMUs for local services in 2000. With a top speed of 120 km/h (75 mph), these Class 642 units are mainly used on branch lines and regional lines. Besides the 234 units purchased by DB in 2007, various private German rail companies are also using Desiro DMUs.

The Class 642 is equipped with two MTU diesel engines with an output of 275 or 315 kW (369 or 422 hp) each and hydro-mechanical transmission with retarders. It typically contains 100 seats. When linked together with Scharfenberg couplers, up to three trainsets can be operated together. The Desiros are quite popular with most passengers, thanks to their good acceleration. Because they have often replaced push/pull trains, their shorter journey times, such as on the Müglitz Valley Railway, have encouraged greater passenger numbers.

Originally DB intended to operate together modern DMUs purchased from different manufacturers, but due to software incompatibilities this proved to be impossible. Therefore, the Class 642 can only be mechanically coupled with other DMUs like the Class 643.

=== Greece ===
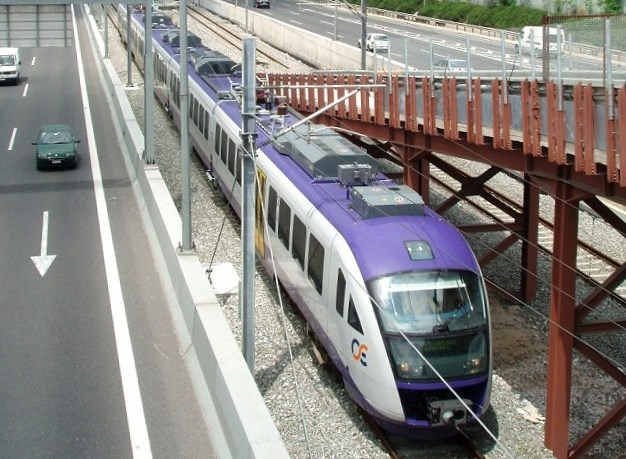
OSE Desiro EMU

In Greece eight diesel DMU-2 Desiro trains (OSE class 660) were temporarily in service with the Hellenic Railways Organisation (OSE) during 2004–2006, and again in 2007 on the Athens–Chalkida line and on the Athens suburban railway lines (Proastiakos). Afterwards they were returned to their owner (Hellenic Shipyards S.A.) in December 2007. In the late 2008 Hellenic Shipyards/MAN-FERROSTAAL leased the eight units to Hungary with a contract for 20 years.

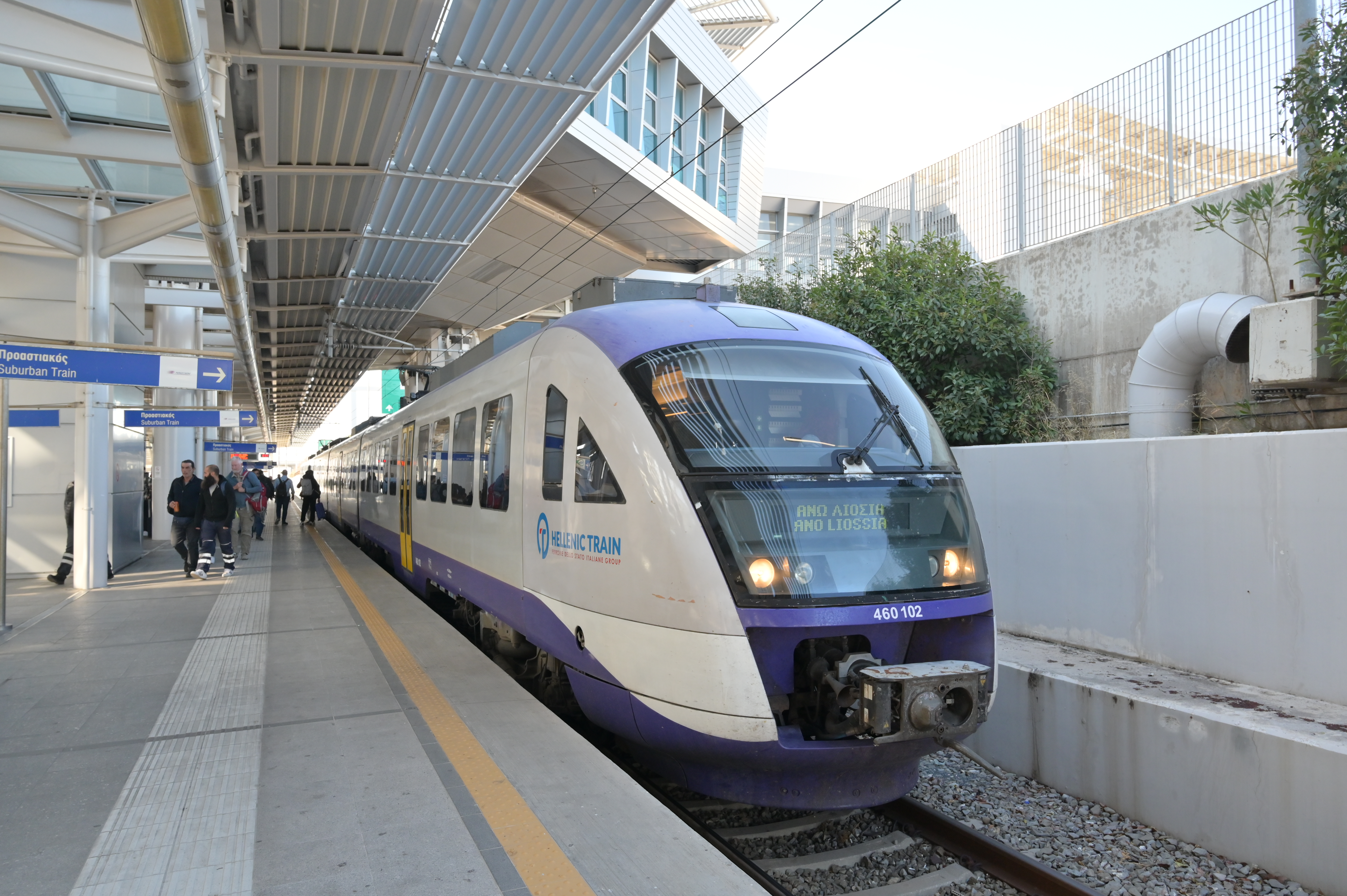
OSE class 460 Desiro EMU in Athens International Airport Station

OSE owns and TrainOSE operates twenty electric Desiro EMU-5 (OSE class 460) equipped for the 25-kV overhead catenary system as part of the Proastiakos fleet. They operate on the Athens Suburban Railway network and as a stopping service on the mainline between Thessaloniki and Larissa, which is advertised as a regional service. OSE is in litigation with the joint venture of Siemens & Hellenic Shipyards for the supply of those 20 Desiros.

=== Hungary ===
At present 31 diesel Desiros are in service with MÁV (including the eight units from Greece), mainly as suburban trains on the regional line between Debrecen - Nagykereki and Budapest - Lajosmizse and as an express train between Budapest and Baja. Also used as local trains between Füzesabony and Debrecen and InterRegio train between Győr and Balatonszentgyörgy via Tapolca. During the summer months (when fewer units are used on the Budapest suburban routes) Desiros appear on some local train diagram on the north shore of the Lake Balaton. Desiros are used as "Helikon InterRegio" trains between Győr, Kaposvár, and Pécs. Desiros are also in service as InterRegio trains between Szombathely and Pécs.

=== Malaysia ===
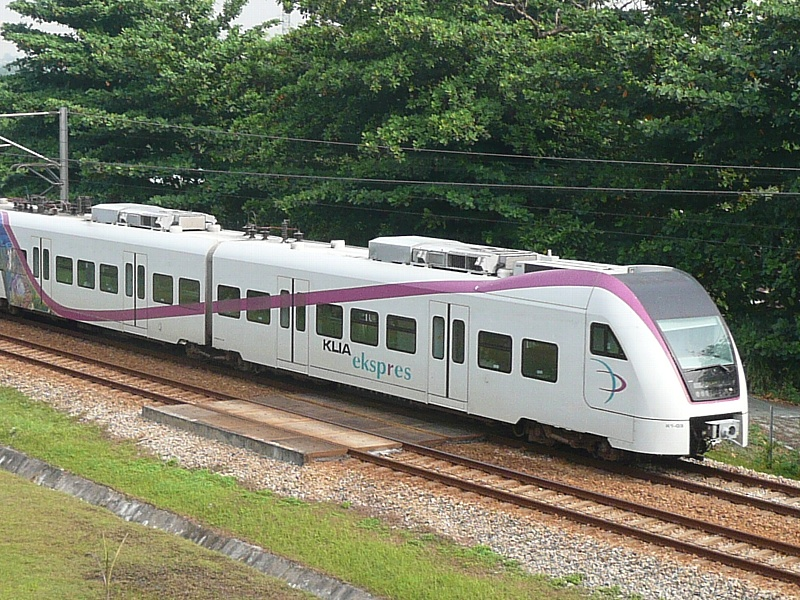
KLIA Ekspres-operated Desiro ET 425 M electric multiple unit train

The 57 km (35 mi) KLIA Express, an airport rail link service between Kuala Lumpur Sentral station and Kuala Lumpur International Airport to the south, uses the Desiro ET425M four-car electric multiple units (EMUs) (which are technically similar to DBAG Class 425 sets in Germany). Twelve trainsets are currently in operation: eight trains are used for the non-stop KLIA Ekspres service between KL Sentral and the airport, while another four trains call at three intermediate stations in between, including one serving Putrajaya. These EMUs have a maximum commercial speed of 160 km/h (100 mph) making them the fastest trains currently operating in Malaysia.

=== Romania ===
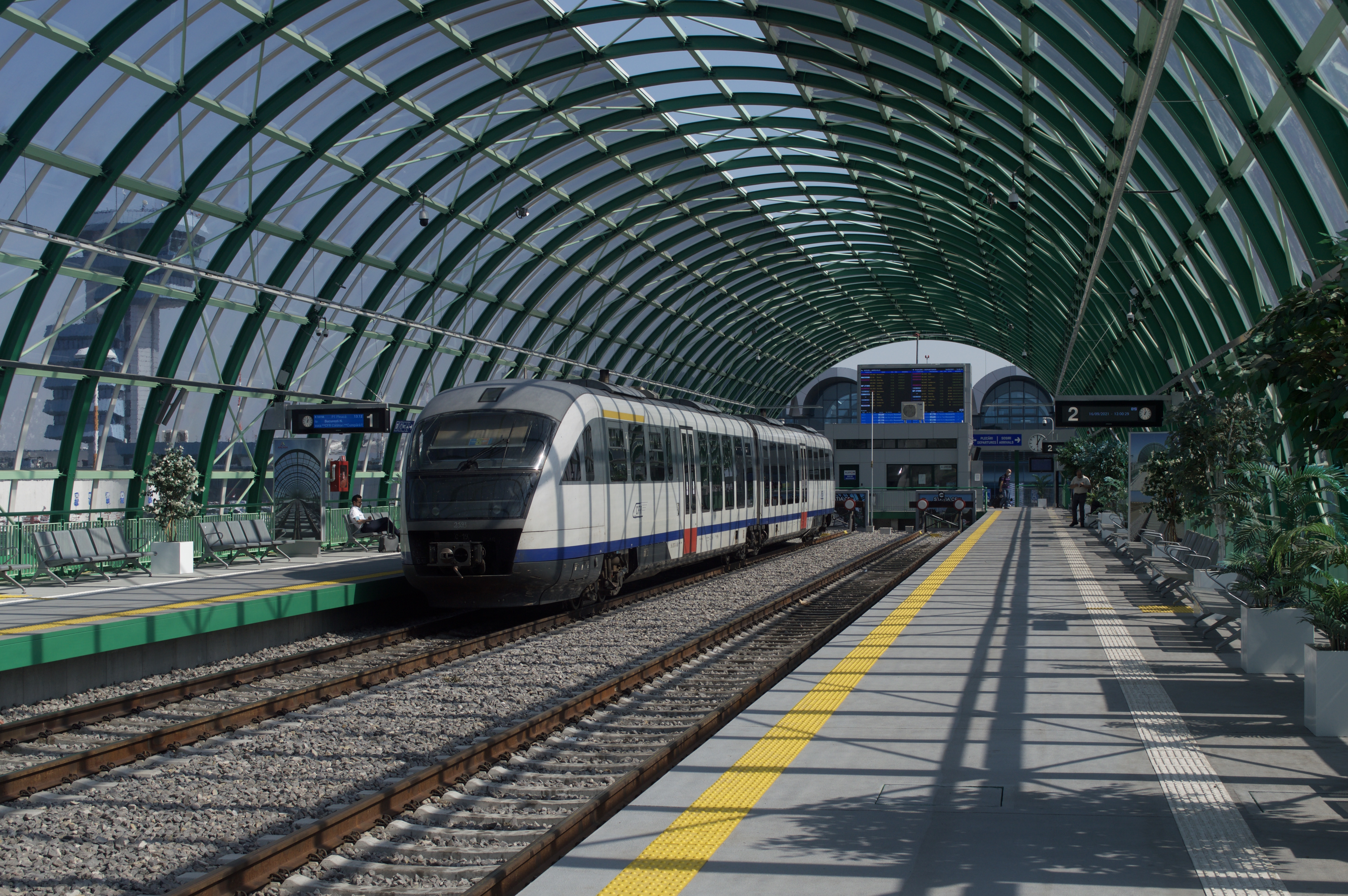
A Desiro train in Romania at Otopeni Airport station

CFR Călători, Romania's national railway operator, is one of the largest users of the Siemens Desiro trainsets (as the light train variant). Introduced since 2003, CFR Călători operates 120 diesel Desiro trainsets, and uses them for both its "Inter Regio", and "Regio" services, but mainly on its "Regio" trains. The trains, designated as CFR Călători Class 96, are nicknamed "Săgeata Albastră" ('The Blue Arrow'). There was some criticism of the use of Desiros for CFR Călători's long-distance services because they were considered to be uncomfortable. CFR Călători had refitted them, and is now using Desiros mainly on its medium- and short-distance routes. For example, it is planning to use them as part of a proposed commuter link in Bucharest and Ilfov County.

=== Slovenia ===
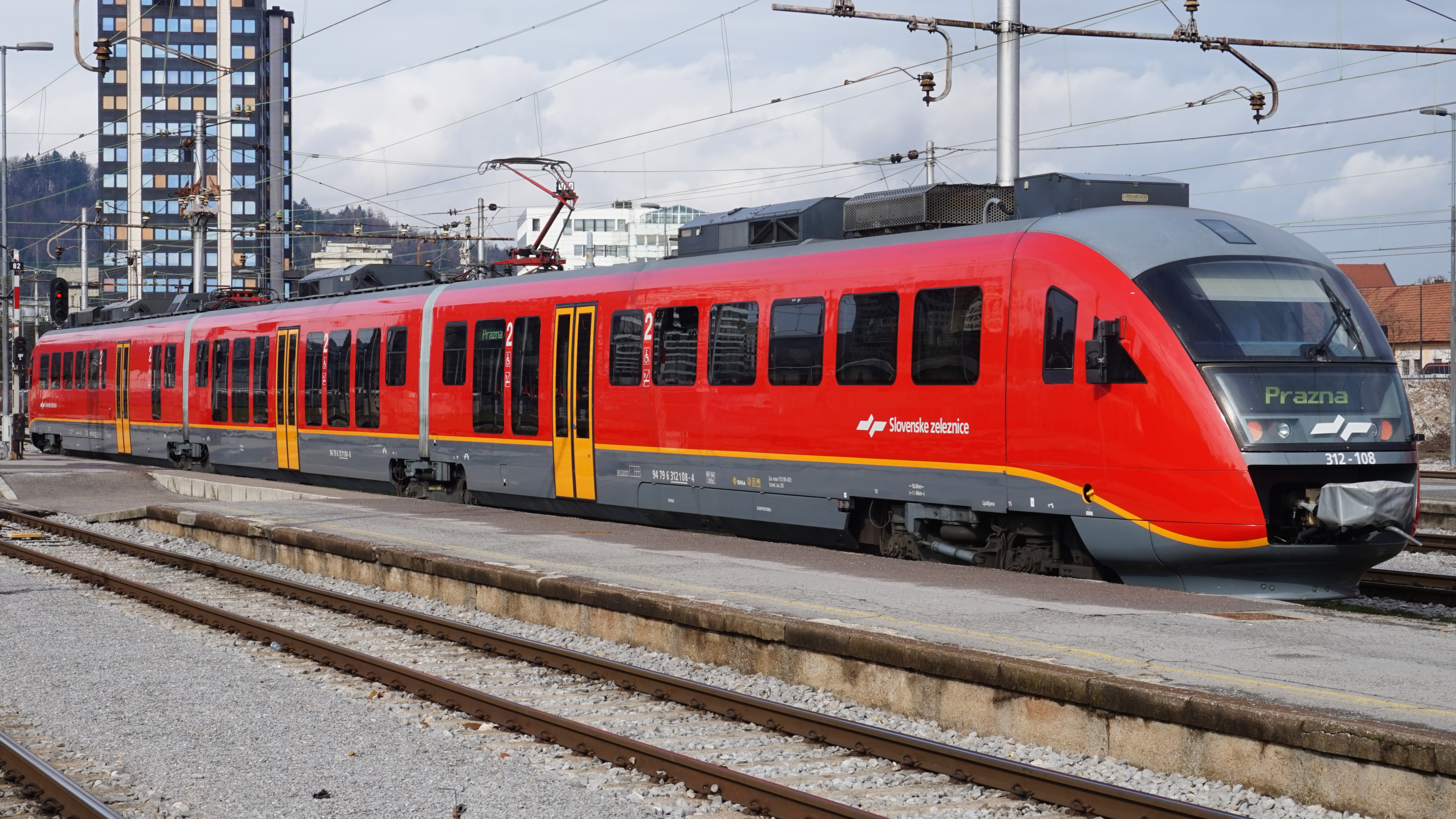
SŽ Series 312 at Ljubljana station

Slovenian Railways operates 30 electric Desiro units that are designated as Desiro EMG 312 SR 31E. They are used as commuter stopping trains on electrified lines, i.e., from Ljubljana to Koper, Jesenice (via Kranj), Maribor and Dobova (via Zidani Most).

=== United States ===
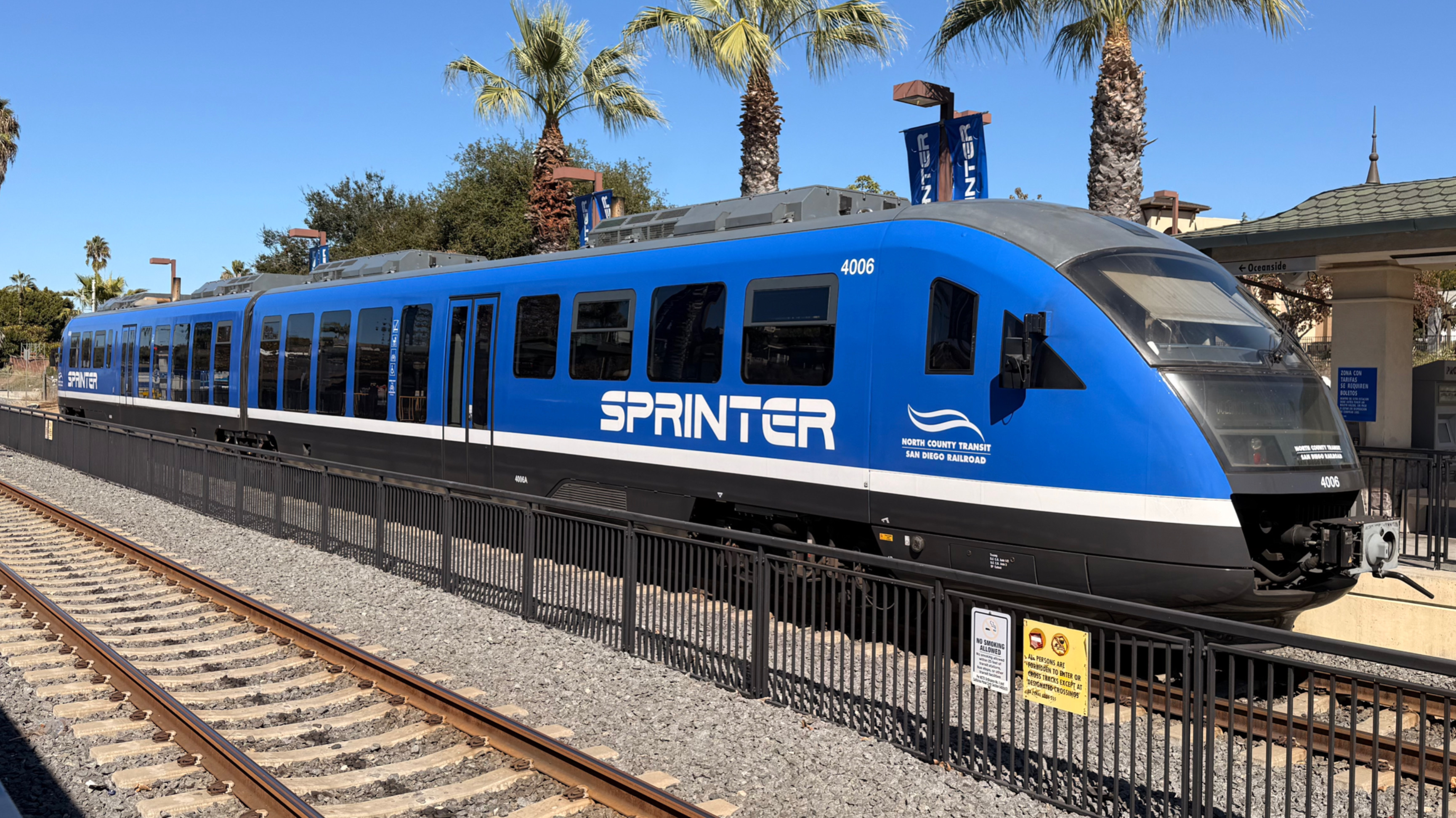
SPRINTER at Vista

The Sprinter hybrid rail system employs VT642 Desiro diesel units. It serves Northern San Diego County, California, United States between Escondido and Oceanside along a 35 km (22 mi) railway line. Twelve married pairs were delivered in August 2006 to the operator North County Transit District (NCTD). Service began on 9 March 2008, serving fifteen stations along the 22-mile right of way.

Mountain Rail, one of two competing coalitions bidding on a large portion of FasTracks in Denver, appeared to be proposing a Siemens Desiro ML derived vehicle that is Federal Railroad Administration compliant. Both EMU and DMU units would have been used for the Northwest Corridor, North Metro Corridor and Gold Line. Electric traction was eventually chosen for the project.

== Desiro Mainline ==
=== Austria ===
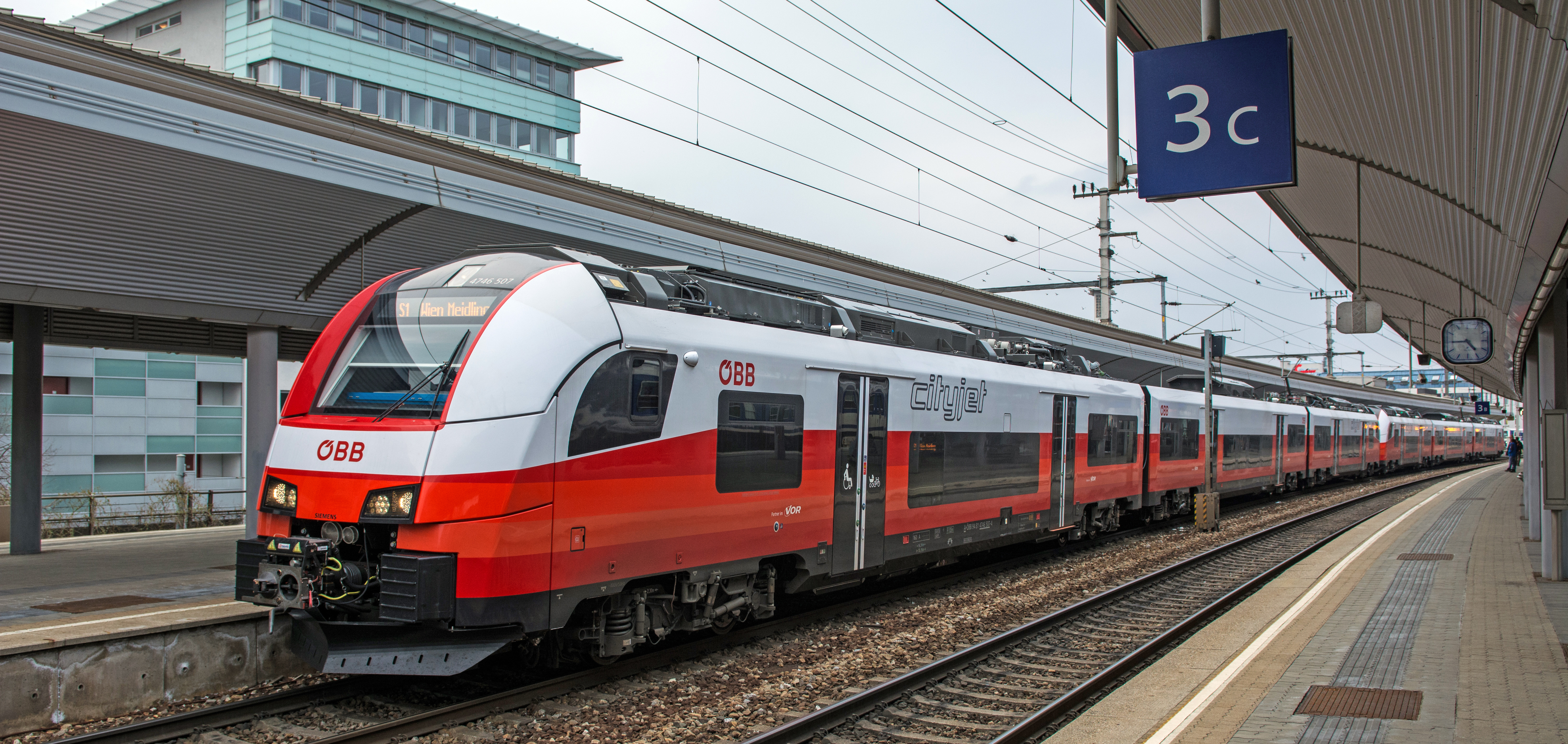
ÖBB cityjet at Wien Floridsdorf train station in Vienna

In April 2010 ÖBB signed a framework agreement for up to 200 Desiro ML trains. The first such trains entered service on the Vienna S-Bahn in 2015, branded as class 4744/4746 cityjet. By the end of December 2021 ÖBB received the last three-car cityjet Desiro ML from the framework contract for 200 vehicles in April 2010.

In August 2021 ÖBB acquired 21 additional four-car cityjet Desiro ML trains with eight doors per side and more than 290 seats.

=== Belgium ===
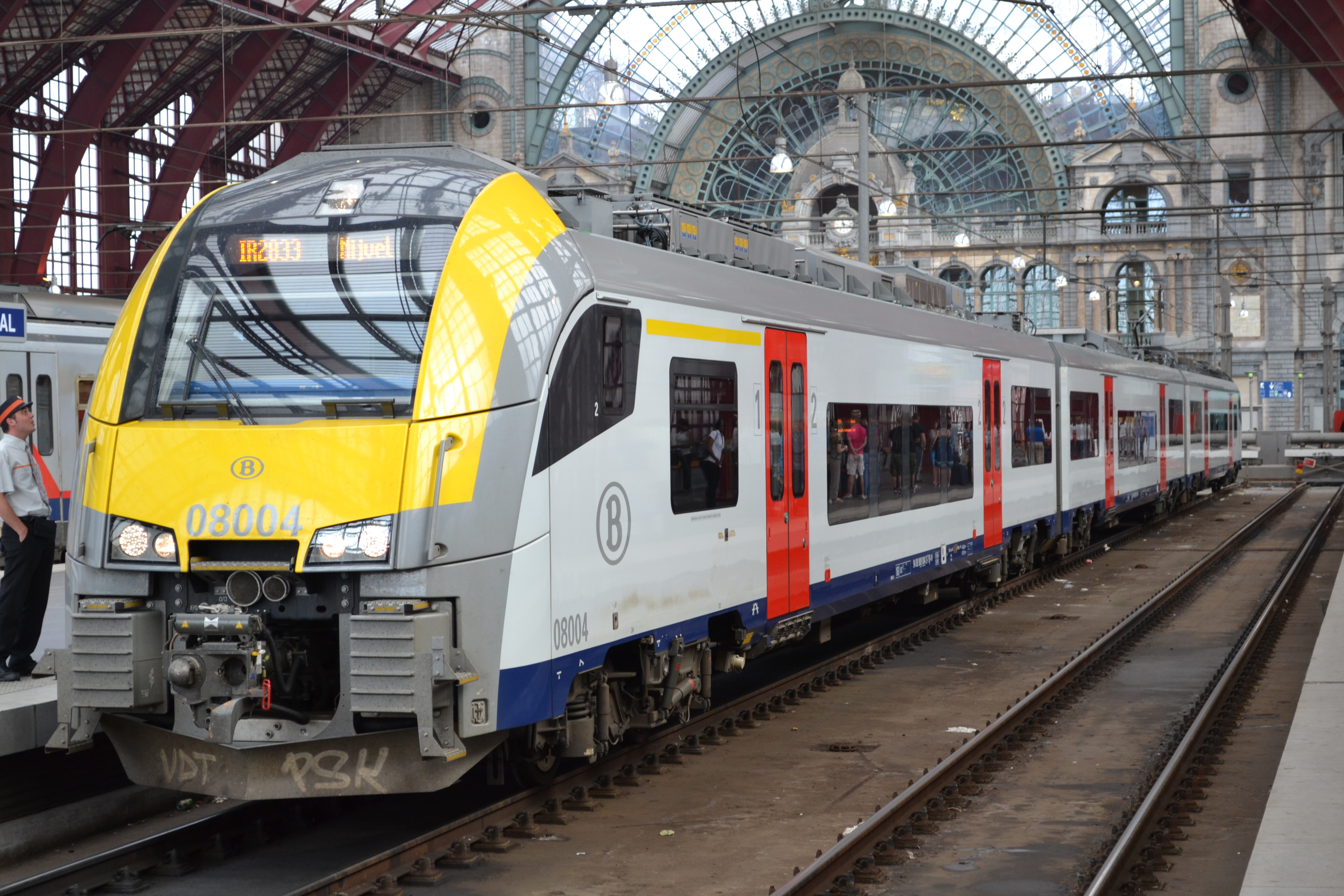
Belgian MS08 at Antwerpen-Centraal in Antwerp

In 2008 NMBS/SNCB ordered 305 Desiro ML trains. In 2013, the order of the final 250 trains was suspended because of technical problems with the trains already running. The company is seeking damages from Siemens for these problems which caused many delays. Siemens had already been fined €25 million for the late delivery of the first batch of trains. The order for all units was confirmed in 2013 and in March 2015 the last two arrived.

In August 2014 the head of the NMBS/SNCB explained to the newspapers that the Desiro trains need repairing too often, i.e., at a rate of one technical intervention per 8000 kilometers. The trains are used heavily on the Brussels Regional Express Network, but also InterCity lines between Antwerp and Ghent and on lines electrified with 25kV AC in the Belgian Ardennes where they replaced diesel-trains or locomotive-hauled stock on the international Liège to Luxembourg City route.

=== Germany ===
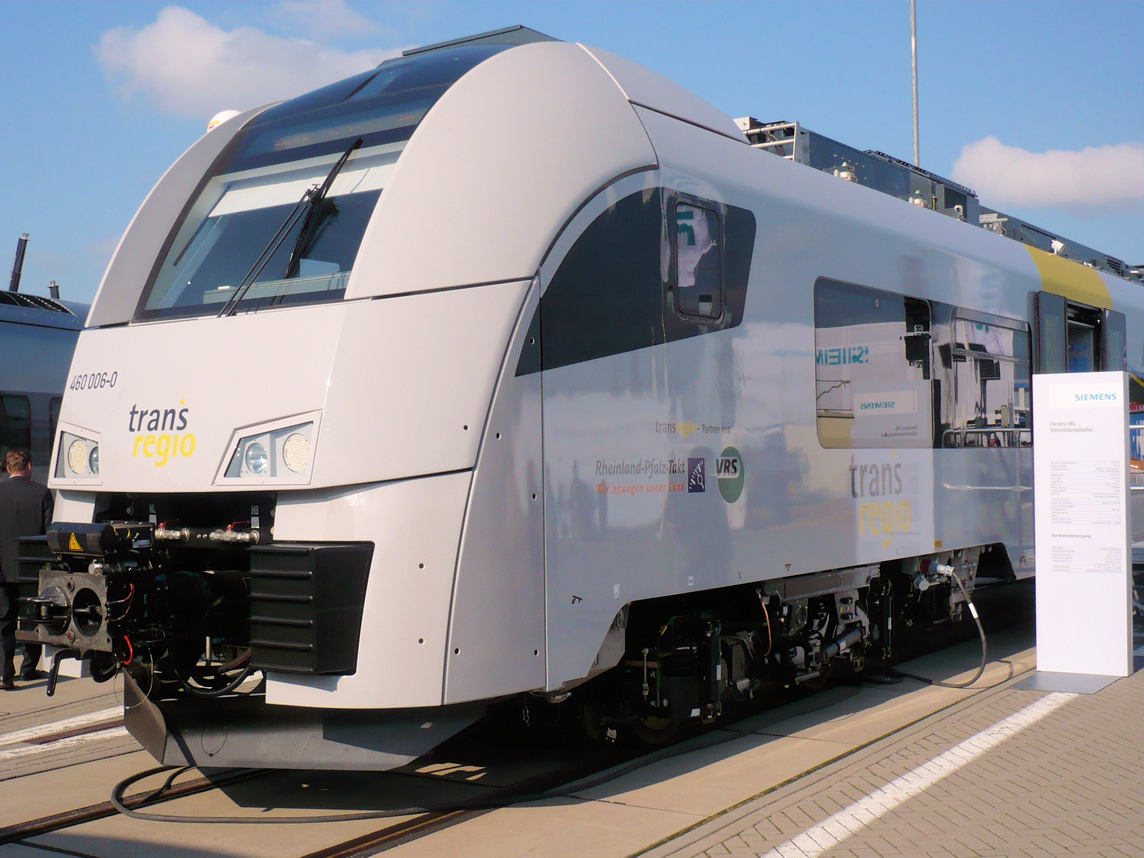
German class 460

Desiro ML Mittelrheinbahn is used by the private rail operator trans regio for regional services between Cologne and Mainz on the left bank of the Rhine. The EMUs are leased from Angel Trains and received the class number 460 by the Eisenbahnbundesamt, the federal railway authority (the unpowered middle carriages have the class number 860). The 15 kV AC overhead line EMUs have a top speed of 160 km/h (99 mph); however they are limited by the EBA to 150 km/h (93 mph) on account of insufficient braking power from 160 km/h (99 mph). All cars use conventional bogies and additional middle carriages can be added later.

== Desiro RUS ==
=== Russia ===
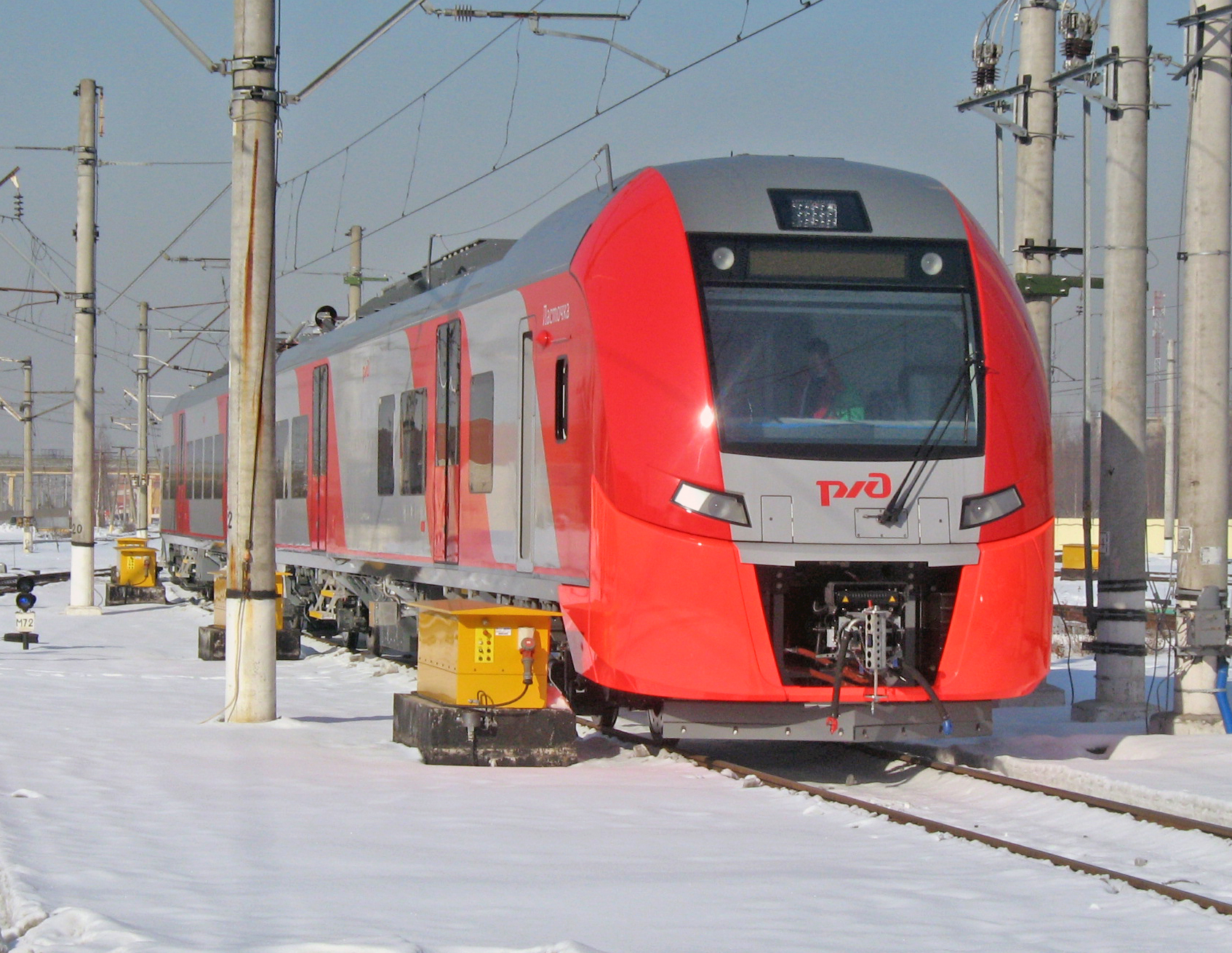
First Russian Lastochka

Desiro RUS, designated ES1, is a 1,520 mm (4 ft 11 27/32 in) broad gauge electric commuter and regional train developed for Russian railways, which calls them Lastochka (English: Swallow).

In January 2013 RZD began putting into service the first 18 trains from the initial order for 38. In mid-2013 a joint venture between Siemens and Ural Locomotives began production of the second batch of 16 trains at a factory in Ekaterinburg. The first train was assembled in June 2014. 62% of its components were produced locally. The factory was expected to supply 240 trains by 2021.

In 2011 RZD ordered 1,200 cars from Ural Locomotives. Local content was to be increased to 80 percent. Siemens also had an order for maintenance of rolling stock for a period of 40 years. The contract with Siemens was estimated at €2.5 billion.

Desiro Rus was divided into 6 types (ES1 (suburban), ES1 Premium (intercity), ES2G (suburban), ES2G (city-urban), ES2GP (intercity), ES1P (intercity).

A total of 281 trainsets (1538 carriage) of all Lastochka types were delivered as of January 2023.

== Desiro UK ==
Siemens uses the name Desiro UK for the diesel multiple unit (DMU) and electrical multiple unit (EMU) trains operated by various United Kingdom and Thailand train operators. These trains have a completely different design to the lighter Desiro Classic variant.

=== Thailand ===
Nine four-car and three-car Desiro UK EMUs based on the British Rail Class 360 are used for the Suvarnabhumi Airport Link in Bangkok, Thailand which provides express and local services between Phaya Thai Station and Suvarnabhumi Airport. The only significant difference from the UK units is a much larger air conditioning pod on the roof, providing extra cooling to cope with the Thai climate. As with other Class 360 units, the trains were built in Krefeld, Germany - and were delivered from 2007. The line opened in 2010.

Class	Image	Operator	Introduced	Number	Power	Carriages	Door configuration	Car length	End Gangway
Class 360/2		Asia Era One Company Limited	2010	9	AC electric	3-4	High-volume	20 m (65 ft 7 in)	No

=== United Kingdom ===
==== EMUs ====
The first Desiro UK units were ordered by South West Trains in 2001 for both short- and long-distance services on the South West Main Line, serving routes between London Waterloo and Alton, Basingstoke, and the Hampshire and Dorset coast, to replace its Mark 1 slam-door EMUs. These became two different classes, both of which use the 750 V DC third-rail power supply. One hundred and ten Class 450 four-car units for commuter services entered service in 2003, and 45 Class 444 five-car units for long-distance inter-city services entered service in 2004.

An additional order for a further 17 Class 450 units was placed, with the trains entering service by early 2007.

First Great Eastern acquired 21 Class 360/1 four-car units which operate from 25 kV overhead electrical supply for services from London Liverpool Street to Clacton-on-Sea and Ipswich. These entered service in 2003.

Heathrow Connect ordered five Class 360/2 four-car units for services between London Paddington and Heathrow Airport. They were converted from a speculative Class 350 order made by Angel Trains. They were later increased to five cars. In May 2018, all of the Class 360/2s were transferred to TfL Rail which were replaced by Class 345 trains from July 2020. In February 2021, it was announced that Rail Operations Group had inherited the Class 360 units from Heathrow Airport Holdings. In August 2022, two sets were scrapped, with the remaining three sets being sold to the Global Centre for Rail Excellence in October 2022.

As part of the modernisation of the West Coast Main Line, the Strategic Rail Authority (SRA) ordered 30 Class 350 dual-voltage sets for use on stopping services by Central Trains and Silverlink. They are operated by West Midlands Trains. These units were originally ordered as Class 450 third-rail units for South West Trains, but following a review by the SRA they were diverted to the West Coast. The dual-voltage capability has only been used in service on temporary loan to Southern on Milton Keynes Central to East Croydon services whilst covering for a shortfall of Southern Class 377 units. In 2008/2009, a further 37 Class 350/2 four-car units entered service with London Midland followed by ten Class 350/3 units in 2013. First TransPennine Express took delivery of ten Class 350/4 units in 2013.

First ScotRail ordered 22 three-car and 16 four-car Class 380 units. Entry to service began 8 December 2010.

Class	Image	Operator	Introduced	Number	Power	Carriages	Door configuration	Car length	End Gangway
Class 350/1		West Midlands Trains	2004	30	AC/DC electric	4	High-volume	20 m (65 ft 7 in)	Yes
Class 350/2		Stored	2008	37	AC electric	4	High-volume	20 m (65 ft 7 in)	Yes
Class 350/3		West Midlands Trains	2014	10	AC electric	4	High-volume	20 m (65 ft 7 in)	Yes
Class 350/4		West Midlands Trains	2013	10	AC electric	4	High-volume	20 m (65 ft 7 in)	Yes
Class 360/1		East Midlands Railway	2003	21	AC electric	4	High-volume	20 m (65 ft 7 in)	No
Class 360/2		Global Centre of Rail Excellence (GCRE)	2005	3	AC electric	5	High-volume	20 m (65 ft 7 in)	No
Class 380/0		ScotRail	2010	22	AC electric	3	High-volume	23 m (75 ft 6 in)	Yes
Class 380/1		ScotRail	2010	16	AC electric	4	High-volume	23 m (75 ft 6 in)	Yes
Class 444		South Western Railway	2004	45	DC electric	5	Low-volume	23 m (75 ft 6 in)	Yes
Class 450		South Western Railway	2003	127	DC electric	4	High-volume	20 m (65 ft 7 in)	Yes

==== DMUs ====
In 2003 First TransPennine Express ordered 51 three-car diesel-powered Desiro UK trains for use on its inter-city services across the north of England and to southern Scotland. These Class 185 units entered service in 2006.

Class	Image	Operator	Introduced	Number	Power	Carriages	Door configuration	Car length	End Gangway
Class 185		TransPennine Express	2006	51	Diesel-Hydraulic	3	High-volume	23 m (75 ft 6 in)	No

== Desiro City ==
Desiro City is a high-capacity commuter EMU for the UK market building on the Desiro UK and Desiro Mainline, with a reduction in weight and energy use, and with 'fly-by-wire' controls.

A £1.6 billion order for 115 eight-car and twelve-car units (1,150 vehicles) for the Thameslink rolling stock programme was awarded in 2011 and finalised in 2013. The vehicles were given the designation Class 700.

In 2014, South West Trains ordered 30 Class 707 five-car units, at a cost of £210 million. In 2017, South Western Railway announced that they would be replacing the Class 707s with Class 701 trains. In April 2020, Southeastern signed a deal to lease the Class 707s for extra capacity.

Twenty-five six-car Class 717s were ordered by Govia Thameslink Railway in December 2015 to replace Class 313 trains on services into Moorgate, entering regular service from March 2019.

Class	Image	Operator	Introduced	Number	Power	Carriages	Door configuration	Car length	End gangways
Class 700/0		Thameslink	2016-18	60	AC/DC electric	8	High-volume	20 m (65 ft 7 in)	No
Class 700/1		Thameslink	2016-18	55	AC/DC electric	12	High-volume	20 m (65 ft 7 in)	No
Class 707		Southeastern	2017-2018	30	DC electric	5	High-volume	20 m (65 ft 7 in)	No
Class 717		Great Northern	2019	25	AC/DC electric	6	High-volume	20 m (65 ft 7 in)	Emergency only

== Desiro HC ==
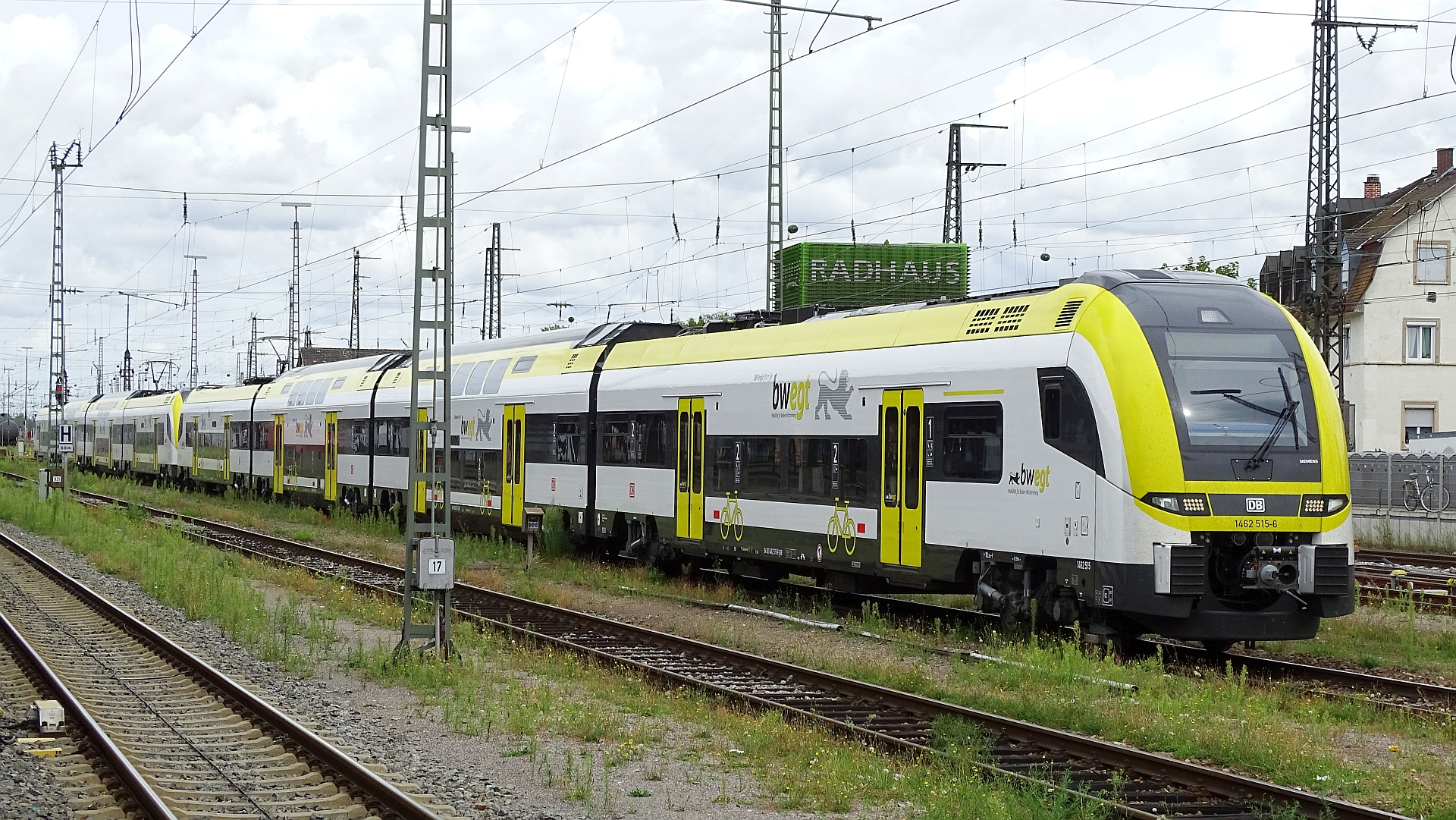
A Desiro HC operated by DB Regio Baden-Württemberg.

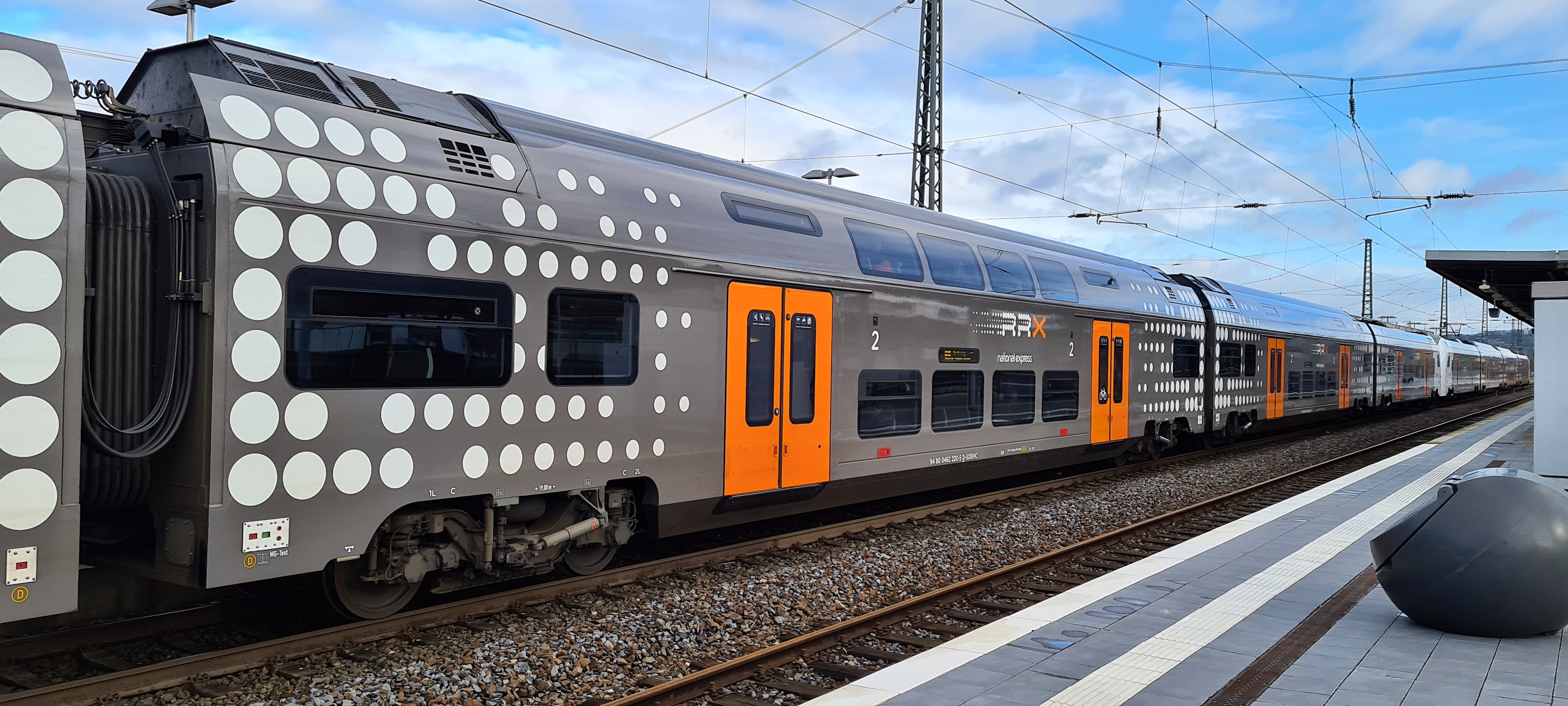
Double deck coach of a Rhein Ruhr Express Desiro HC operated by National Express.

At InnoTrans 2014, Siemens presented its Desiro High Capacity (Desiro HC) offering. The Desiro HC consists of single deck motor cars with up to four intermediate double deck coaches, which combines accessibility with capacity.

=== Egypt ===
In May 2022, it was announced the Egypt has ordered 94 Desiro four-car sets, amongst other railway equipment, for a 2,000 km (1,200 miles) railway development.

=== Germany ===
In April 2015, Siemens announced that it had won a tender to build a fleet of 82 Desiro HC trains for the Rhein-Ruhr-Express (RRX) project in Germany.

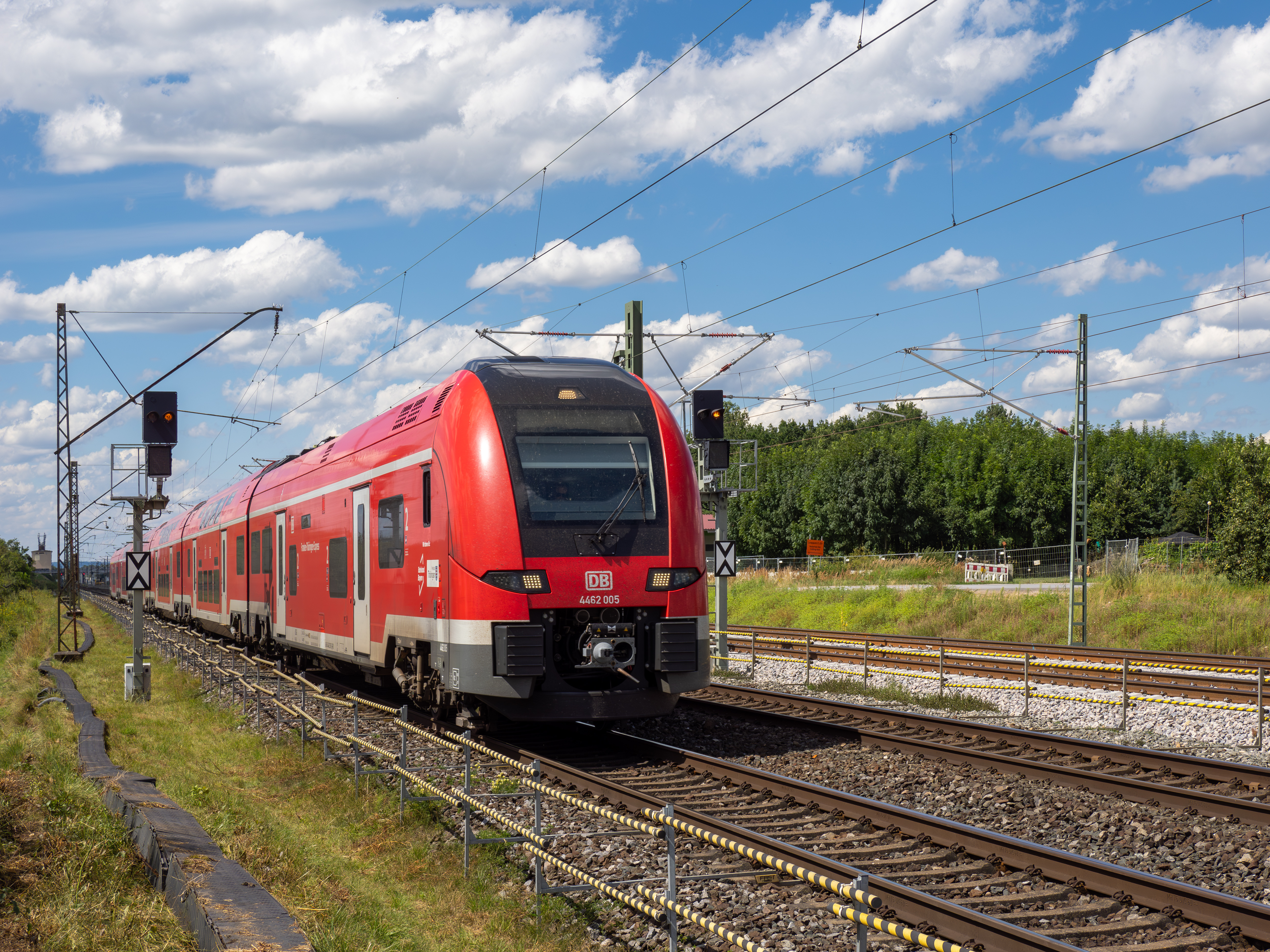
A six-car Desiro HC train passing Altendorf station in 2024.

In December 2023, 18 four-car Desiro HC trains entered service on the Franken-Thuringen-Express network, followed by 8 six-car Desiro HC trains in June 2024. Also in December 2024, 25 four-car Desiro HC trains entered service on the Donau-Isar-Express network.

=== Israel ===
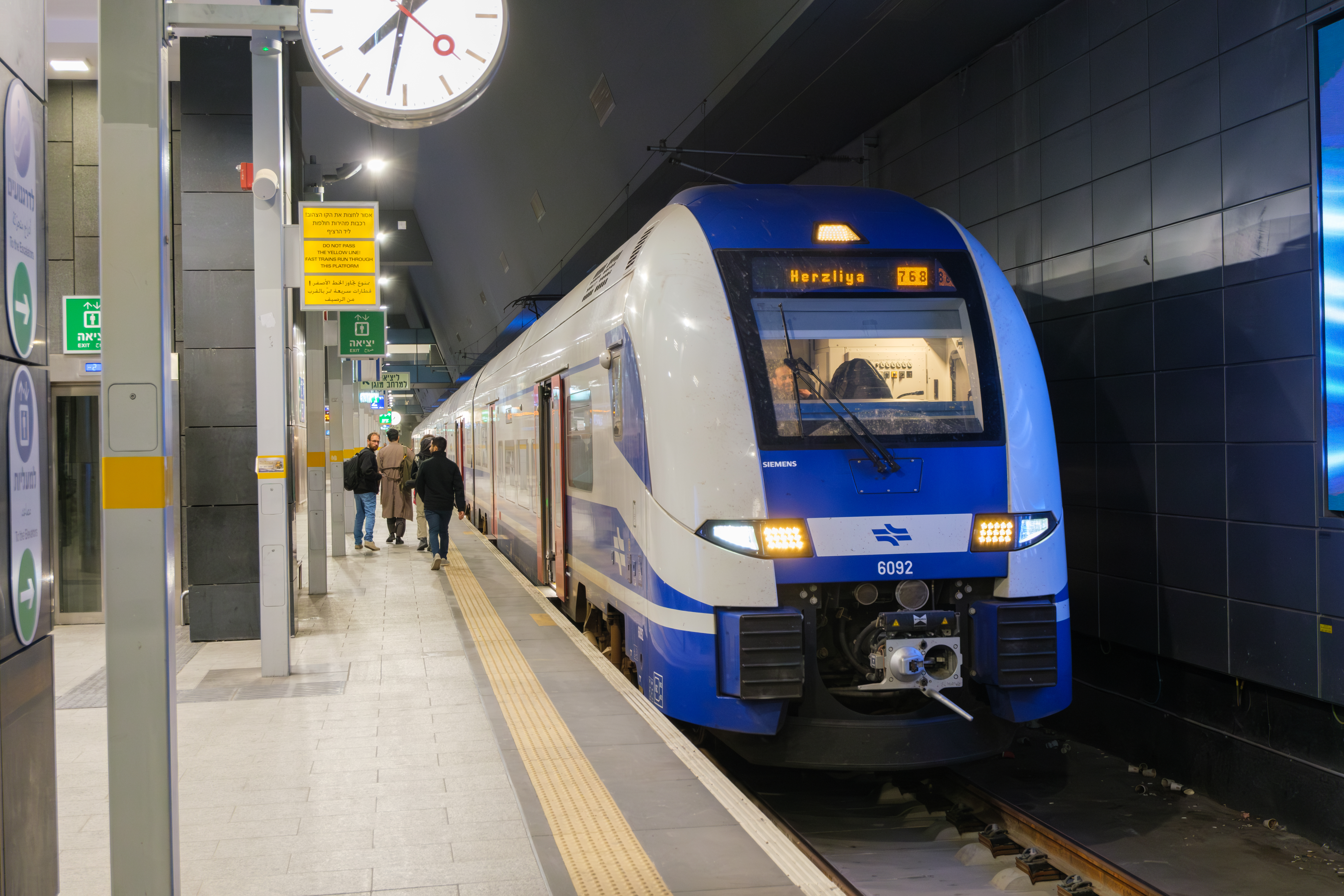
Israel Railways Desiro HC at Jerusalem–Yitzhak Navon railway station in 2024

In September 2017, Israel Railways announced that Siemens was the successful bidder in a tender for 60 Electric Multiple Unit sets (for a total of 330 carriages) to be delivered starting in 2021. Under the contract, Siemens will supply Israel Railways with Desiro HC trainsets at a value of US$910 million with options for additional units to be supplied in the future. Siemens will also build a US$65 million maintenance depot in Ashkelon and maintain the first 24 trains for the sum of US$114 million, with an option for Israel Railways to increase the number of trains under Siemens' maintenance later.

== Desiro Double Deck ==
A low-floor, double-deck multiple unit.

=== Switzerland ===
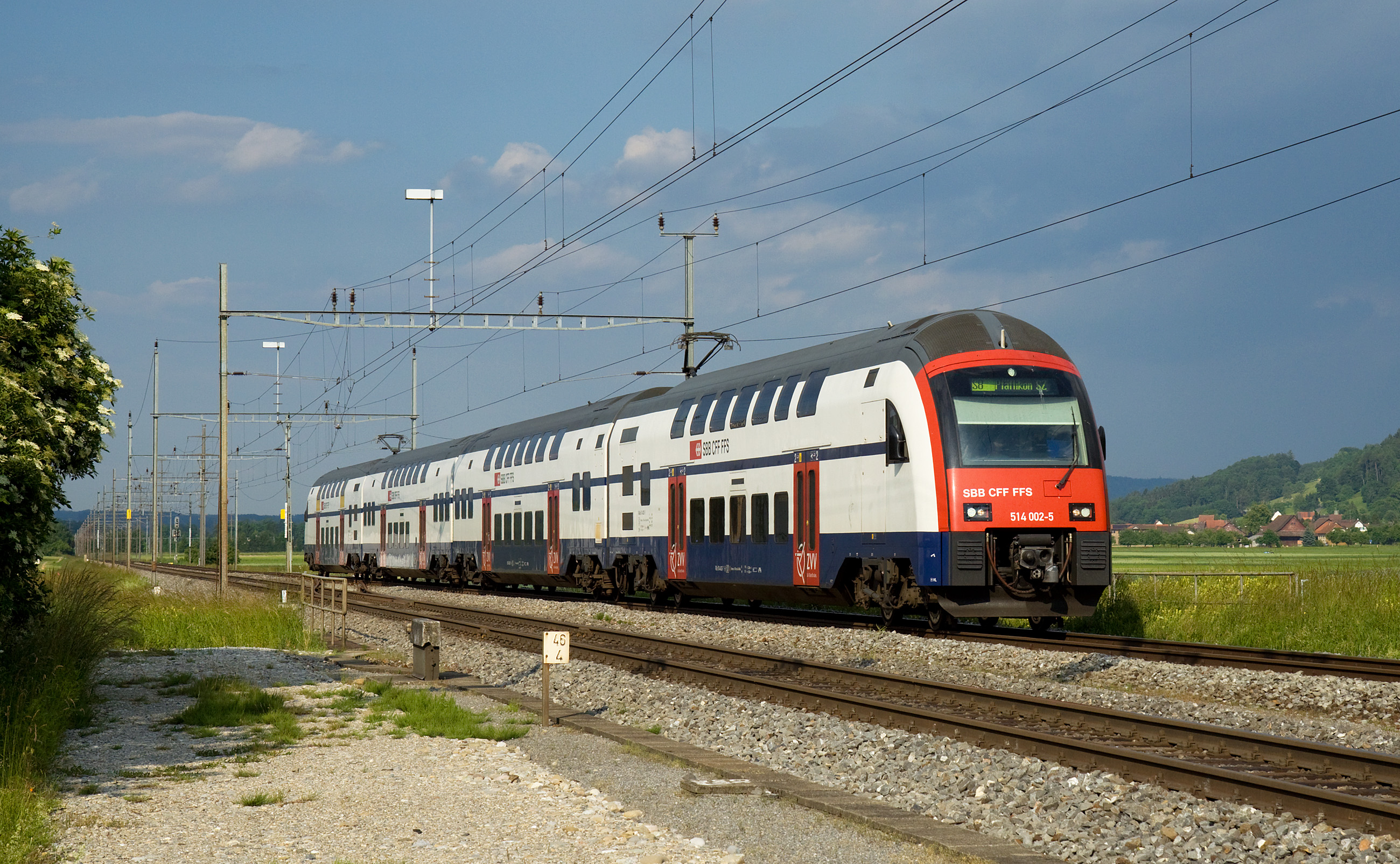
A Swiss Federal Railways operated Desiro train in Zürich's S-Bahn rail system

Swiss Federal Railways operates double-decker, or bilevel, EMUs designated as class SBB RABe 514. They are used as commuter trains in Zürich, as part of the Zürich S-Bahn, where 61 four-car sets have been in operation since 2006.

== Desiro Verve ==
The Desiro Verve is the name given to a prospective tri-mode (diesel-battery-electric) version of the Desiro, currently being developed in the UK, and planned to be built at Siemens Goole.

The battery technology developed as part of the project has already been deployed on Siemens' Mireo Plus B trains, built for the state of Baden-Württemberg, Germany.

== See also ==
- Alstom Aventra
- CAF Civity
- Stadler FLIRT
- TMH Ivolga
