= Verkhnyaya Pyshma =

Town in Sverdlovsk Oblast, Russia

Verkhnyaya Pyshma Верхняя Пышма
- Town
- View of Verkhnyaya Pyshma

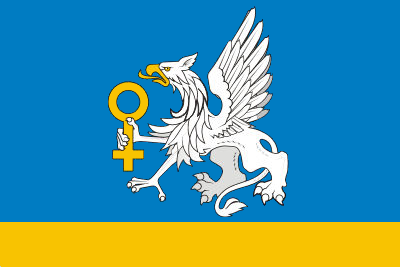
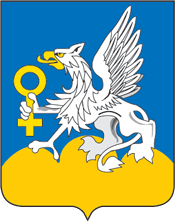
- Flag Coat of arms
- Interactive map of Verkhnyaya Pyshma
- Location of Verkhnyaya Pyshma Verkhnyaya Pyshma (Sverdlovsk Oblast)
- Coordinates: 56°58′34″N 60°35′40″E
- Country: Russia
- Federal subject: Sverdlovsk Oblast
- Founded: 1660
- Town status since: 1946
- Elevation: 270 m (890 ft)

Population (2010 Census)
  - Total: 59,749
  - Estimate (2025): 77,492 (+29.7%)

Administrative status
  - Subordinated to: Town of Verkhnyaya Pyshma
  - Capital of: Town of Verkhnyaya Pyshma

Municipal status
  - Urban okrug: Verkhnyaya Pyshma Urban Okrug
  - Capital of: Verkhnyaya Pyshma Urban Okrug
- Time zone: UTC+5 (MSK+2)
- Postal code: 624080
- Dialing code: +7 34368
- OKTMO ID: 65732000001

Verkhnyaya Pyshma (Russian: Ве́рхняя Пышма́) is a town in Sverdlovsk Oblast, Russia, located 1 kilometer (0.62 mi) north of Yekaterinburg. A large industrial center of the region. Due to its historical connection with copper mining and processing, Verkhnyaya Pyshma is called the "Copper Capital of the Urals".

Fountain in Verhnyaya Pyshma on the stamps of Russia 2009

== History ==
It was founded in 1660 as the village (selo) of Pyshminskoye, which was named after the Pyshma River. A copper mine opened here in 1856. Town status was granted to it in 1946.

Town development in 20th century is closely related to copper production. The factory called Uralelectromed developed here and in 1990s it became the main company of Ural Mining and Metallurgical Company holding. The company Ural Locomotives is also located there, it produces modern Russian locomotives and trains such as 2ES10 (the most powerful Russian locomotive) and Lastochka suburban EMU based on Siemens Desiro.

== Administrative and municipal status ==
Within the framework of the administrative divisions, it is, together with the town of Sredneuralsk and twenty-seven rural localities, incorporated as the Town of Verkhnyaya Pyshma—an administrative unit with the status equal to that of the districts. As a municipal division, Verkhnyaya Pyshma and twenty-four rural localities are incorporated as Verkhnyaya Pyshma Urban Okrug. The town of Sredneuralsk, together with three other rural localities, is incorporated separately as Sredneuralsk Urban Okrug.

== Coat of arms ==
The coat of arms of the town is a griffin holding a gold mirror of Venus. The griffin is the guard of riches and also the symbol of strength of mind. The mirror of Venus represents copper, which is mined in the region.

== Ecology and health issues ==
In late July 2007, the town was hit by an outburst of atypical pneumonia, with 200 infected and 170 death cases. According to the official information, the infection was caused by Legionella pneumophila virus, which spread through the water supply network. However, there was much speculation that biological warfare (similarly to Sverdlovsk anthrax leak in 1979), or the pollution from chemical industry, is responsible for the infection.

== Politics ==
At the regional elections held on 18 September 2016, 62,276 voters were included in the voting lists of the Verkhnepyshma City Election Commission. 24,228 people took part in the elections.

Voting results for elections to the Regional Duma in the urban district of Verkhnyaya Pyshma in a single electoral district:

- United Russia - 10,242 (42.28%)
- A Just Russia - 4364 (18.01%)
- Liberal Democratic Party of Russia - 3480 (14.37%)
- Communist Party of the Russian Federation - 2997 (12.37%)
- Yabloko - 731 (3.02%).

== Twin towns – sister cities ==
Verkhnyaya Pyshma is twinned with:

- Zhodzina, Belarus
