= Kuzino, Bolshesosnovsky District, Perm Krai =

Kuzino Кузино
- Village
- Location within Perm Krai Location within Russia
- Coordinates: 57°35′N 54°28′E
- Country: Russia
- Region: Perm Krai
- District: Bolshesosnovsky District
- Time zone: UTC+5:00

Kuzino (Russian: Кузино) is a rural locality (a village) in Bolshesosnovskoye Rural Settlement, Bolshesosnovsky District, Perm Krai, Russia. The population was 119 as of 2010. There are 4 streets.

== Geography ==
Kuzino is located 15 km southwest of Bolshaya Sosnova (the district's administrative centre) by road. Gladky Mys is the nearest rural locality.
