= Dmitry Pumpyansky =

Russian billionaire

- Дмитрий Пумпянский
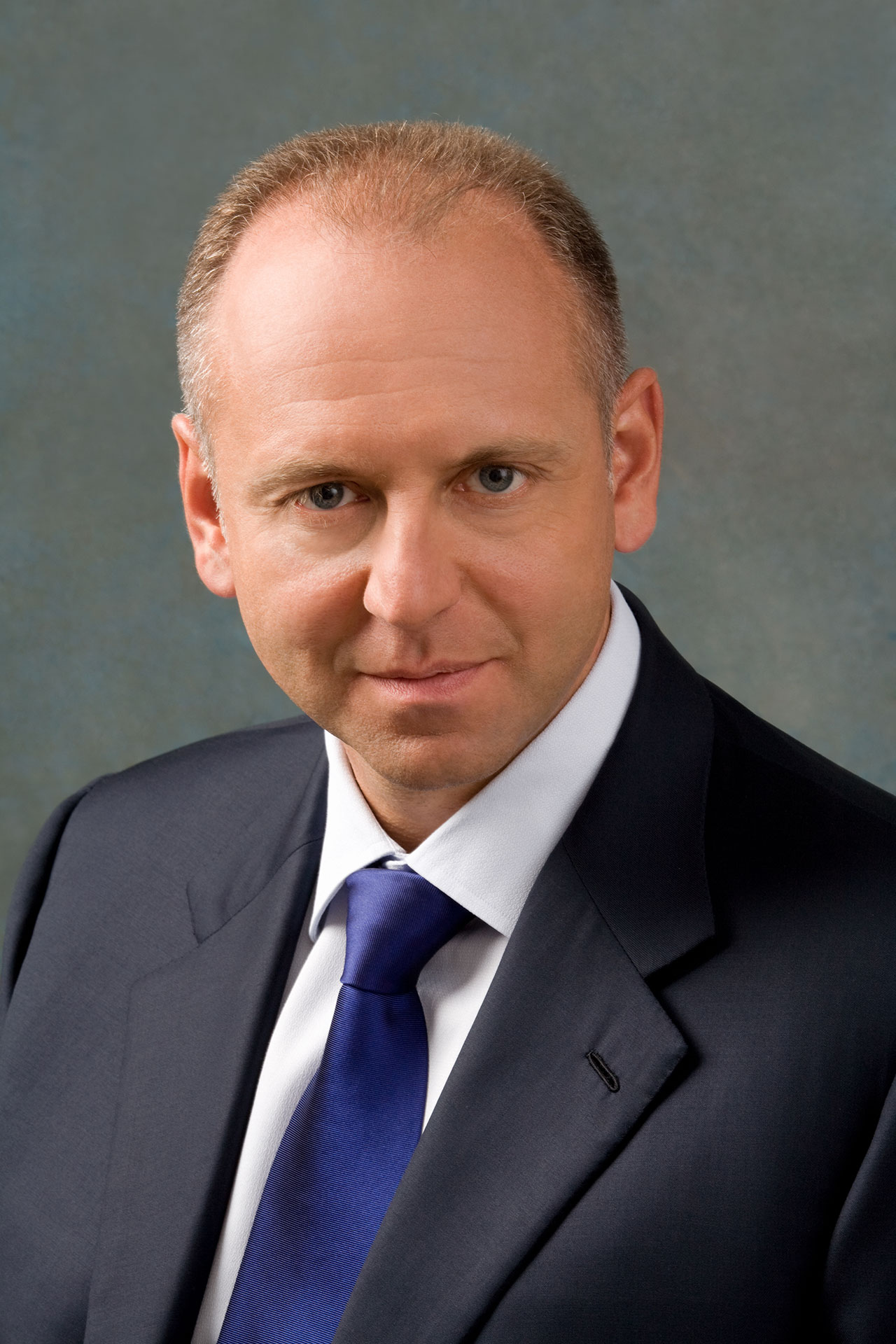
- Pumpyansky in 2016
- Born: 22 March 1964 (age 62)
- Occupation: Businessman
- Children: 1

Dmitry Aleksandrovich Pumpyansky (Russian: Дмитрий Александрович Пумпянский; born 22 March 1964) is a Russian billionaire businessman. He was the owner and chairman of OAO TMK, a Russian global manufacturer of steel pipes for the oil and gas industry. As of August 2022, his net worth was estimated at US$2.0 billion.

== Early life ==
Pumpyansky graduated from the Kirov Ural Polytechnic Institute in 1986, and earned a Candidate of Sciences (Engineering), and a Doctor of Science (Economics).

2024 — Doctor of Technical Sciences. Dissertation topic: “Scientific foundations for the development of steels, alloys, and high-efficiency technologies for the production of next-generation OCTG and specialty pipe solutions.”

== Career ==
Pumpyansky started as a metals trader, then ran several metal factories, then took over the Sinarsky Pipe Factory.

Pumpyansky joined OAO TMK in 2002. Together with fellow billionaires Sergei Popov and Andrey Melnichenko, they bought the company, and he bought them out in 2006, becoming the 100% owner. He was the chairman of TMK.

On March 9, 2022, TMK said in a statement that Pumpyansky is no longer a beneficiary of the Russian pipe manufacturer and has resigned from the company's board of directors.

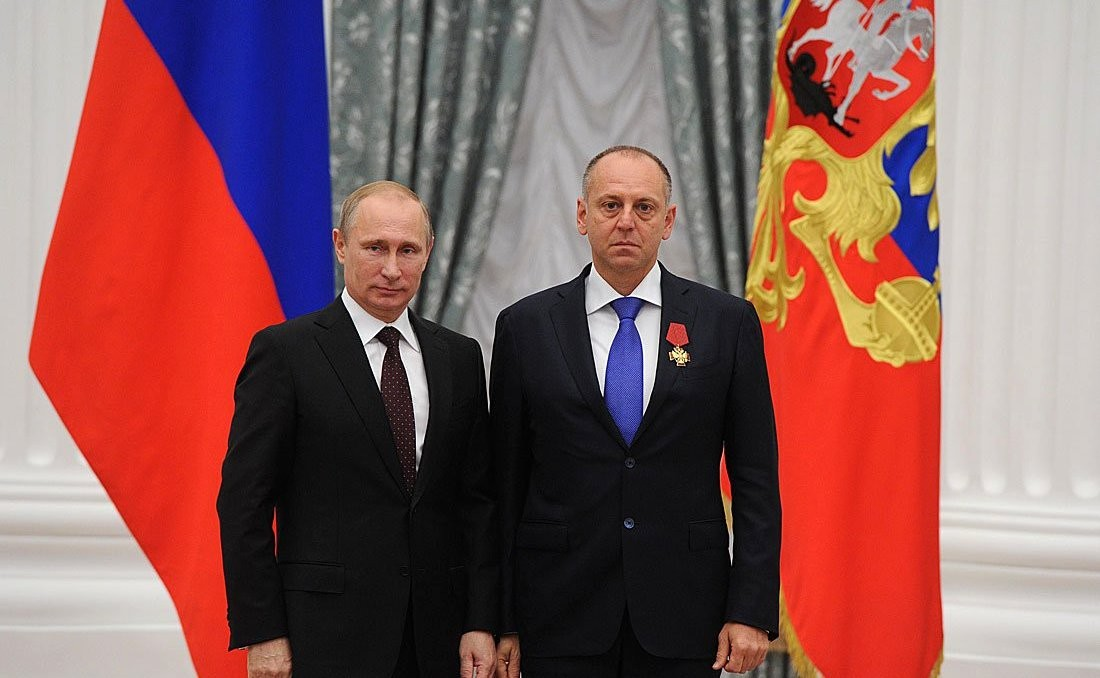
President Vladimir Putin awards the 4th Degree Order "For Merit to the Fatherland"" to Pumpyansky, 31 July 2014

== Personal life ==
Pumpyansky is married, with one child. According to Forbes, he lives in Yekaterinburg, Russia. In 2022 Swissinfo reported that he, his wife, and Swiss son live in Geneva. He owned the 236-foot megayacht Axioma until it was auctioned off after it was seized in Gibraltar.

== Sanctions ==
Pumpyansky is on the list of 96 "oligarchs" in Countering America's Adversaries Through Sanctions Act, passed into US law in August 2017.

He was sanctioned by the UK government in 2022 in relation to the Russo-Ukrainian War.

In March 2022, Pumpyansky was put on a list of sanctions by the European Union. Following an appeal, the European General Court annulled the sanctions in September 2025.
