= VL11 =

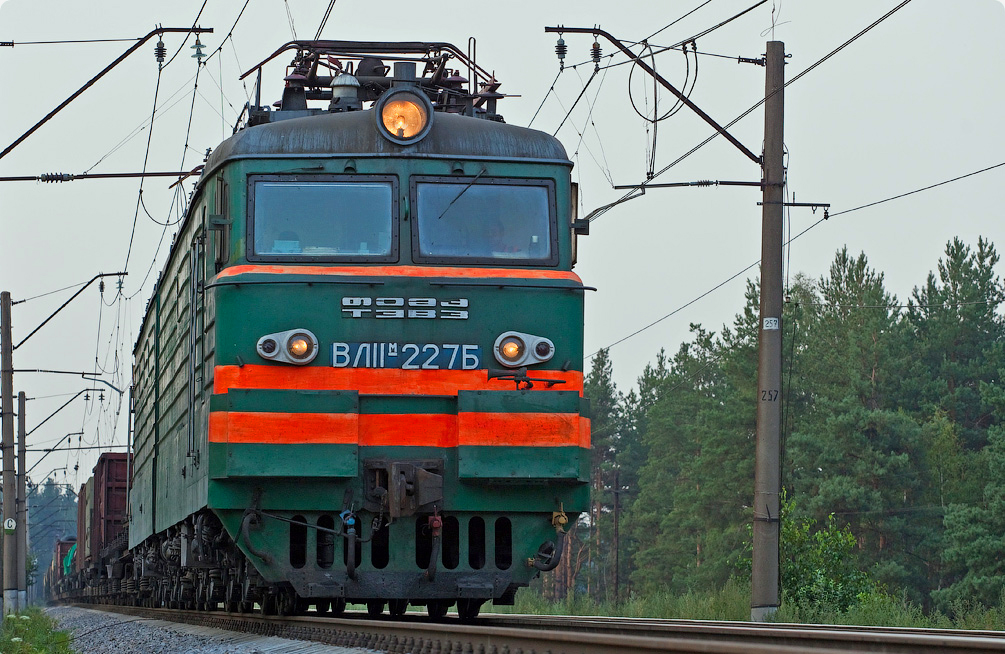
- VL11M-227
Type and origin
- Power type: Electric
- Builder: Tbilisi electric locomotive builder plant (Тбилисский электровозостроительный завод)
- Build date: 1975-
- Total produced: 1338
Specifications
- Configuration
  - UIC: Bo′Bo′+Bo′Bo′
- Gauge: 1,524 mm (5 ft); 1,520 mm (4 ft 11 27/32 in) Russian gauge
- Loco weight: 184 t (181 long tons; 203 short tons)
- Electric system/s: 3 kV DC Catenary
- Current pickup(s): Pantograph
Performance figures
- Maximum speed: 100 km/h (62 mph)
- Power output: 4,600 kW (6,200 hp) Continuous, 5,360 kW (7,190 hp) Short Term
Career
- Operators: РЖД (RZhD), УЗ (UZ), Georgian Railway
- Locale: Russia; Soviet Union; Ukraine (Georgia (country)) Georgia; Azerbaijan

The VL11 Russian: ВЛ11 is an electric mainline DC freight and passenger locomotive, built in Georgia, used in Russia and Ukraine. The initials VL are those of Vladimir Lenin (ru: Владимир Ленин), after whom the class is named.

The ВЛ11 are built in two-section units, but can be built with three or four sections working with multi-tier technology. The three-section units have 12 axles, regenerative brakes and can haul loads up to 59,250 kg. They have an output of 8,040 kW.

The Ukrainian State Railway Administration (Ukrzaliznytsia) has upgraded their VL11 locomotives; starting in 2012, they plan to upgrade 20 a year. The upgrade will extend the operating life of each locomotive by 15 years, and it represents only 28% of the cost of a new electric locomotive.

== See also ==
- The Museum of the Moscow Railway, at Paveletsky Rail Terminal, Moscow
- Rizhsky Rail Terminal, Home of the Moscow Railway Museum
- Varshavsky Rail Terminal, St.Petersburg, Home of the Central Museum of Railway Transport, Russian Federation
- History of rail transport in Russia
