= Ural Locomotives =

Railway equipment manufacturer

- Company type: Open joint-stock company
- Founded: 2010
- Headquarters: Verkhnyaya Pyshma, Russia
- Revenue: 29,985,000,000 Russian ruble (2017)
- Owners: Sinara Transport Machines
- Website: Official

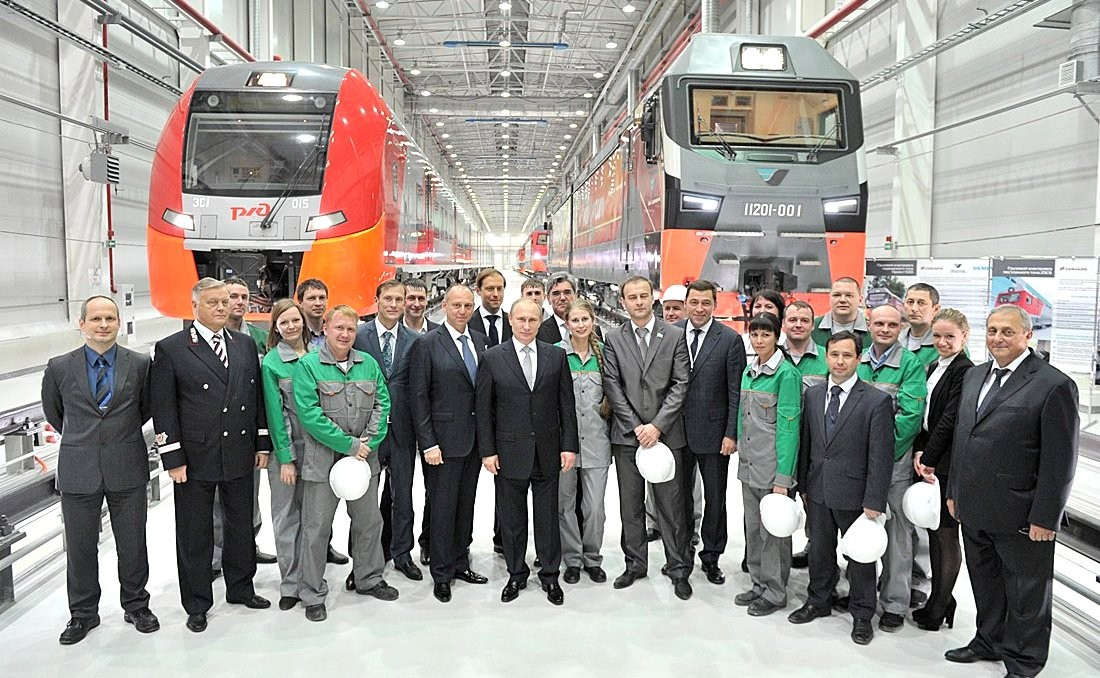
Workers of Ural Locomotives with Vladimir Putin

Ural Locomotives (Russian: Уральские локомотивы) is a railway engineering company. It was initially formed as a joint venture between Sinara Transport Machines and Siemens in 2010. Following the Russian invasion of Ukraine, Siemens exited Russia in May 2022, with Sinara Group taking full control a month later.

The manufacturing facilities are based at the Ural Railway Engineering Plant in Verkhnyaya Pyshma, which was incorporated into the Sinara Group in 2004.

In October 2004, the plant began collaboration with RZD with the aim of production of electric freight locomotives.

== History ==
The Ural Railway Engineering Plant was formed to locate a DC electric freight locomotive production site within Russian territory; formerly, during the Soviet era DC electric locomotive production in the USSR had been located in Tbilisi in Georgia.

Initially the plant was involved in the upgrading of electric locomotives of type VL11 (ВЛ11), by 2006 the plant had produced the first unit of electric locomotive 2ES6 (2ЭС6), which was certified for use by 2008. By 2009 production capacity for up to 60 twin-unit locomotives per year had been installed.

In 2010 a joint venture with Siemens (49% Siemens holding) named ООО "Уральские локомотивы" (Ural Locomotives) was formed to produce electric freight locomotives utilising asynchronous traction. The Sinara Group production facilities in Russia were to be based at the factory in Verkhnyaya Pyshma. The joint venture included a technology transfer agreement, with electrical traction components manufactured at Siemens' St. Petersburg plant "Сименс Электропривод". The locomotive produced as a result of the venture were the 2ES10 (2ЭС10) type. The first 2ES10 unit was produced in early 2011.

Following the exit of Siemens from Russia in May 2022, Siemens Mobility filed a lawsuit claiming Ural Locomotives had not paid them 799 million rubles for equipment supplied under a 2018 contract, in addition to penalty charges.

An order for 41 trainsets was placed with Ural Locomotives, following a similar order for 2 pre-series trains, in September 2024, for service on the Moscow-Saint Petersburg high speed railway.

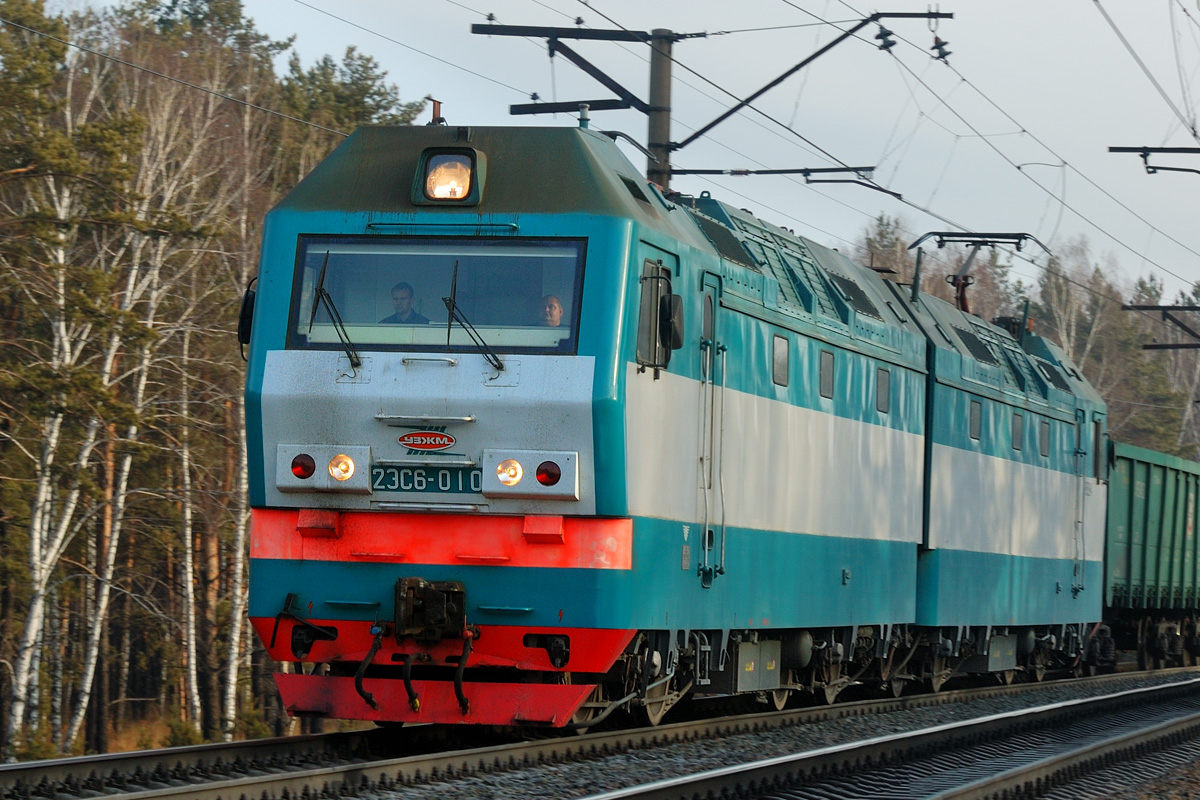
2ES6 "Sinara" (2006-current)- eight-axle two-piece main cargo electric locomotive DC commutator motors.

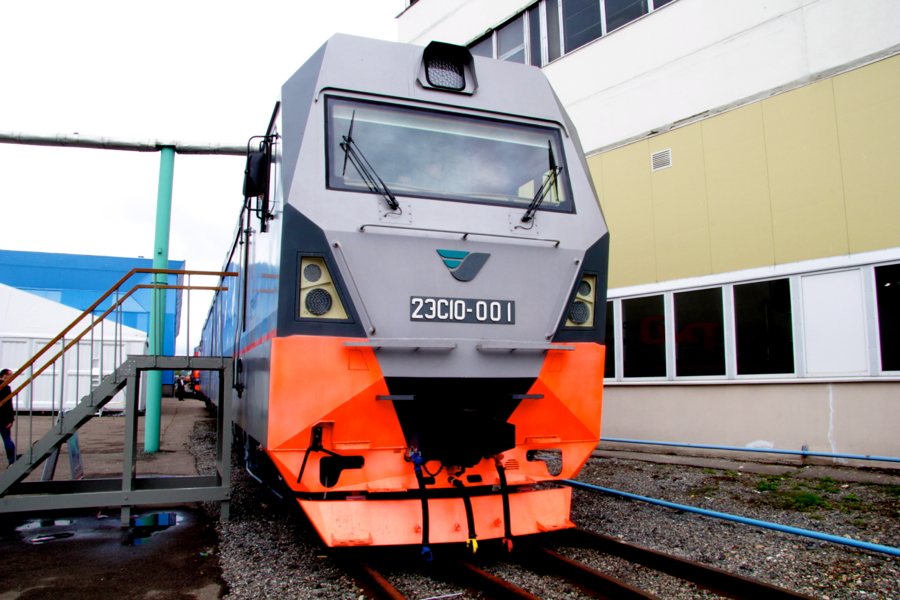
2ES10 "Granit" (2010-current)- eight-axle articulated trucks DC electric locomotives with asynchronous traction drive. Design developed by the Department of Research and Development, Ural Locomotives and Siemens.

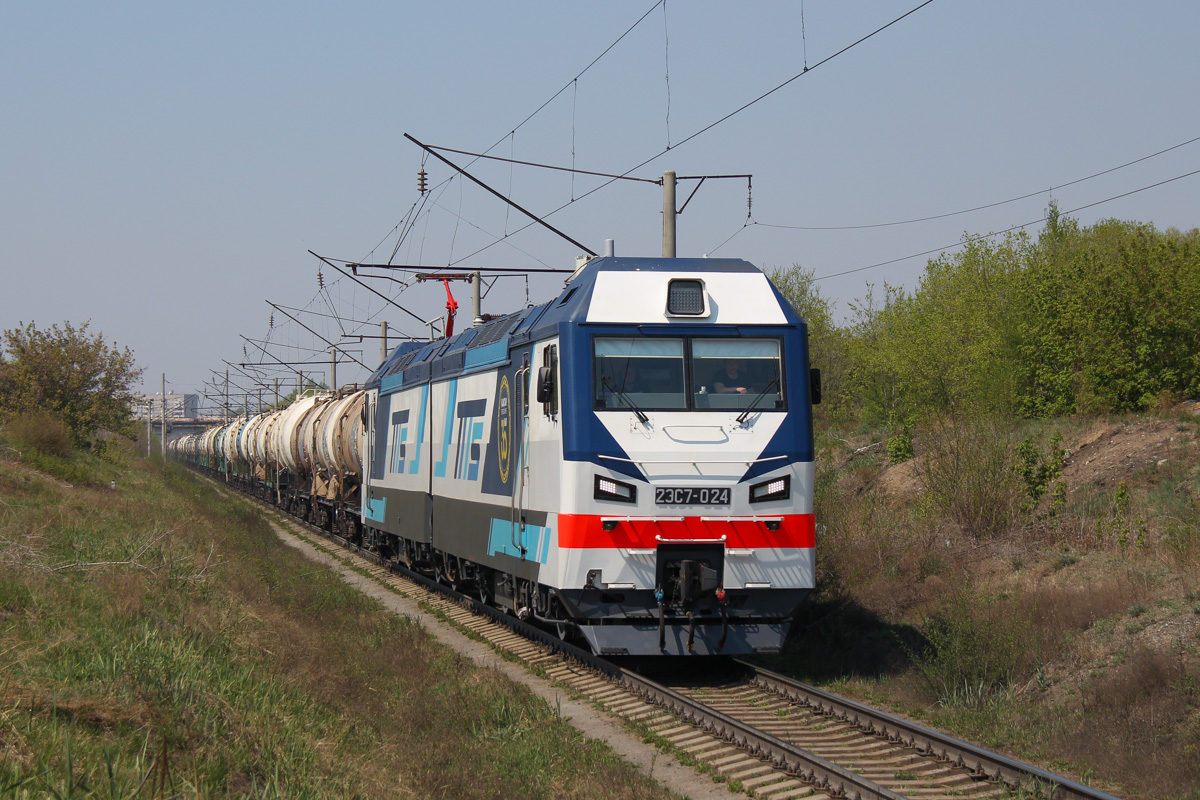
2ES7 series AC mainline electric locomotives (2016-current), developed by Siemens and Ural Locomotives

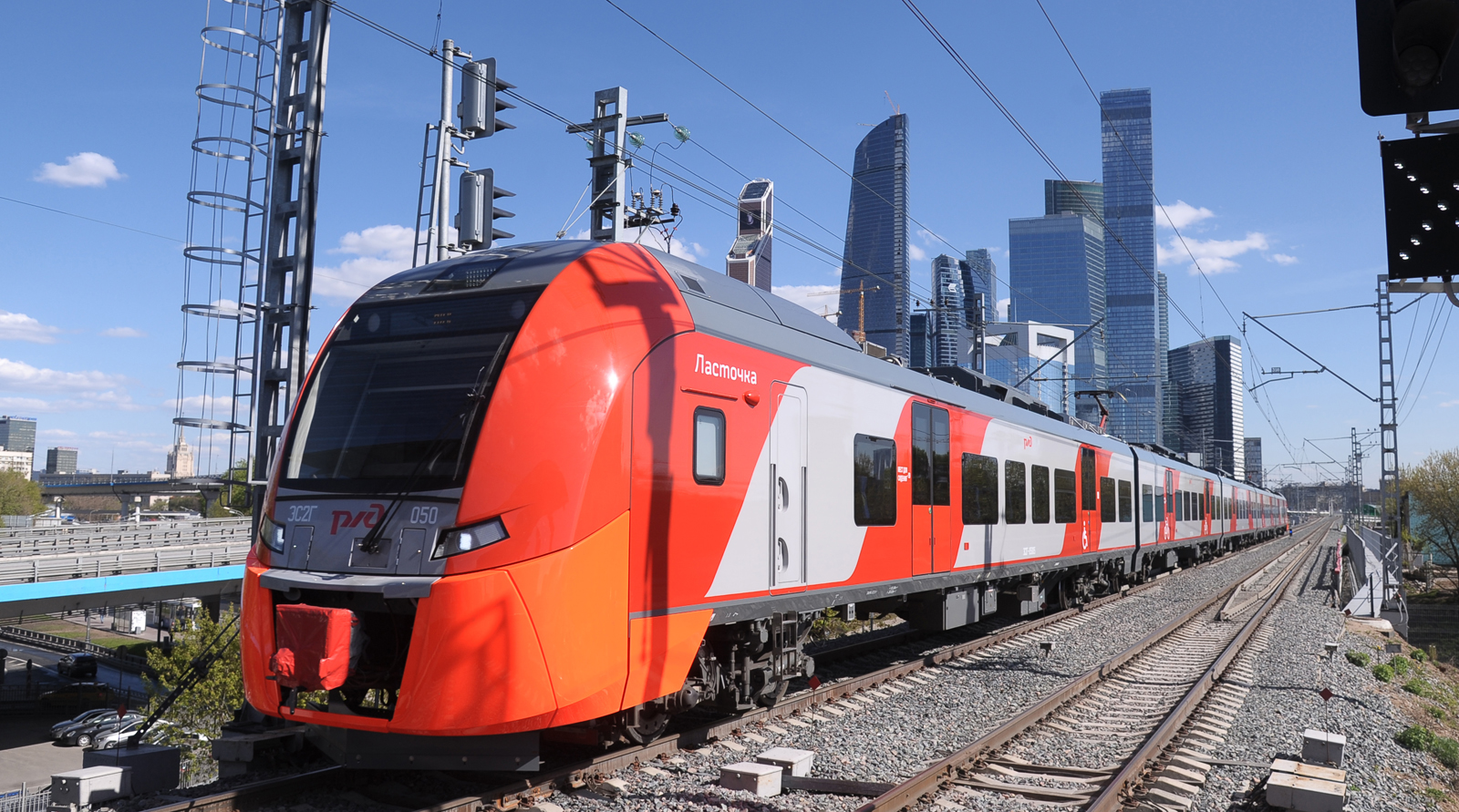
Lastochka (2013-current) electric multiple units developed by Siemens and Ural Locomotives
