= High-speed rail in Russia =

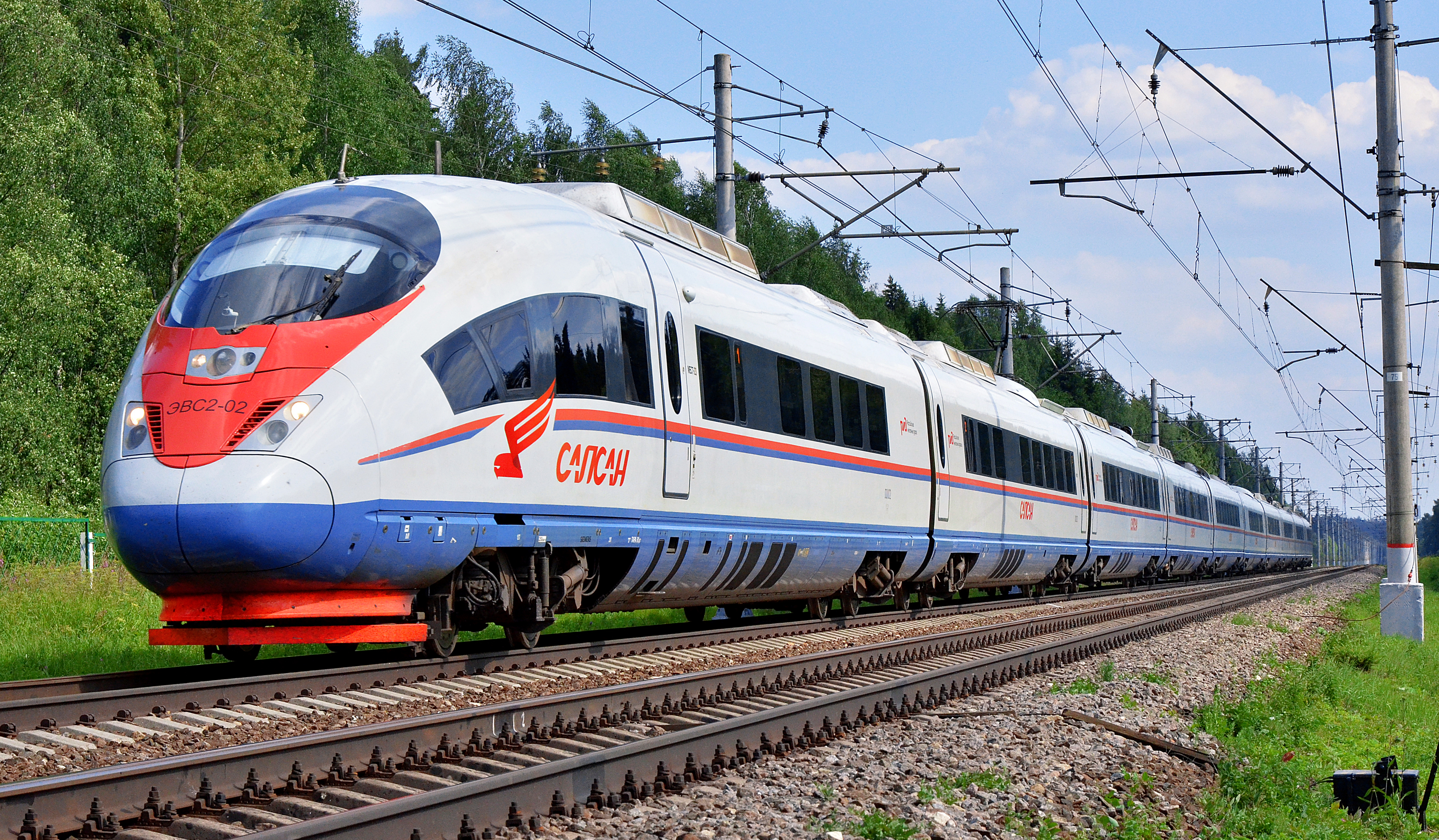
Russian high-speed Sapsan, operating a Siemens Velaro RUS train on route from Moscow to Saint Petersburg

High-speed rail (Russian: Высокоскоростные железные дороги) is emerging in Russia as an increasingly popular means of transport, where it is twice as fast as the regular express trains between Moscow and Saint Petersburg. As of 2026, only one high speed line is operational in Russia.

== Service development ==
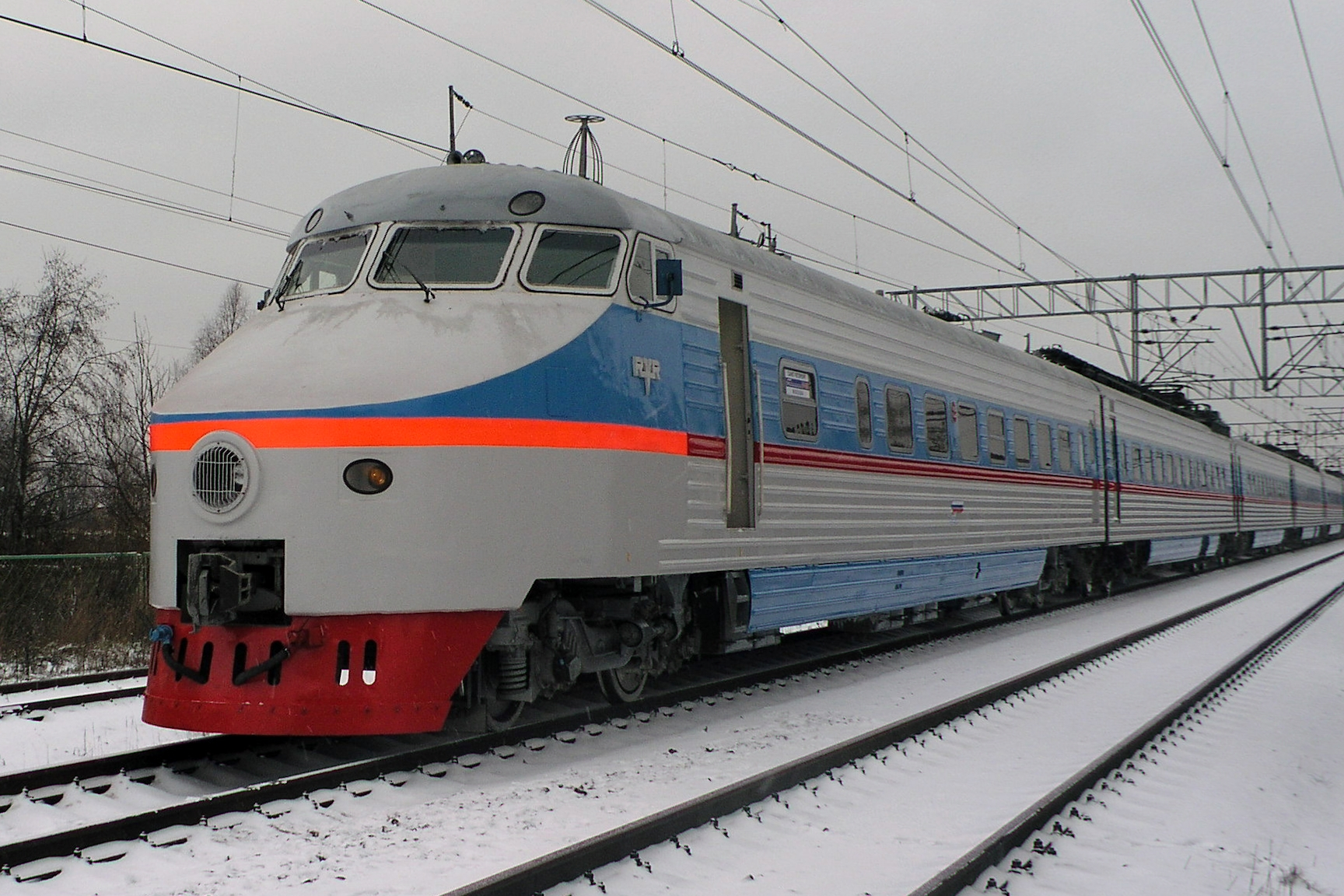
ER-200 (1984–2009)

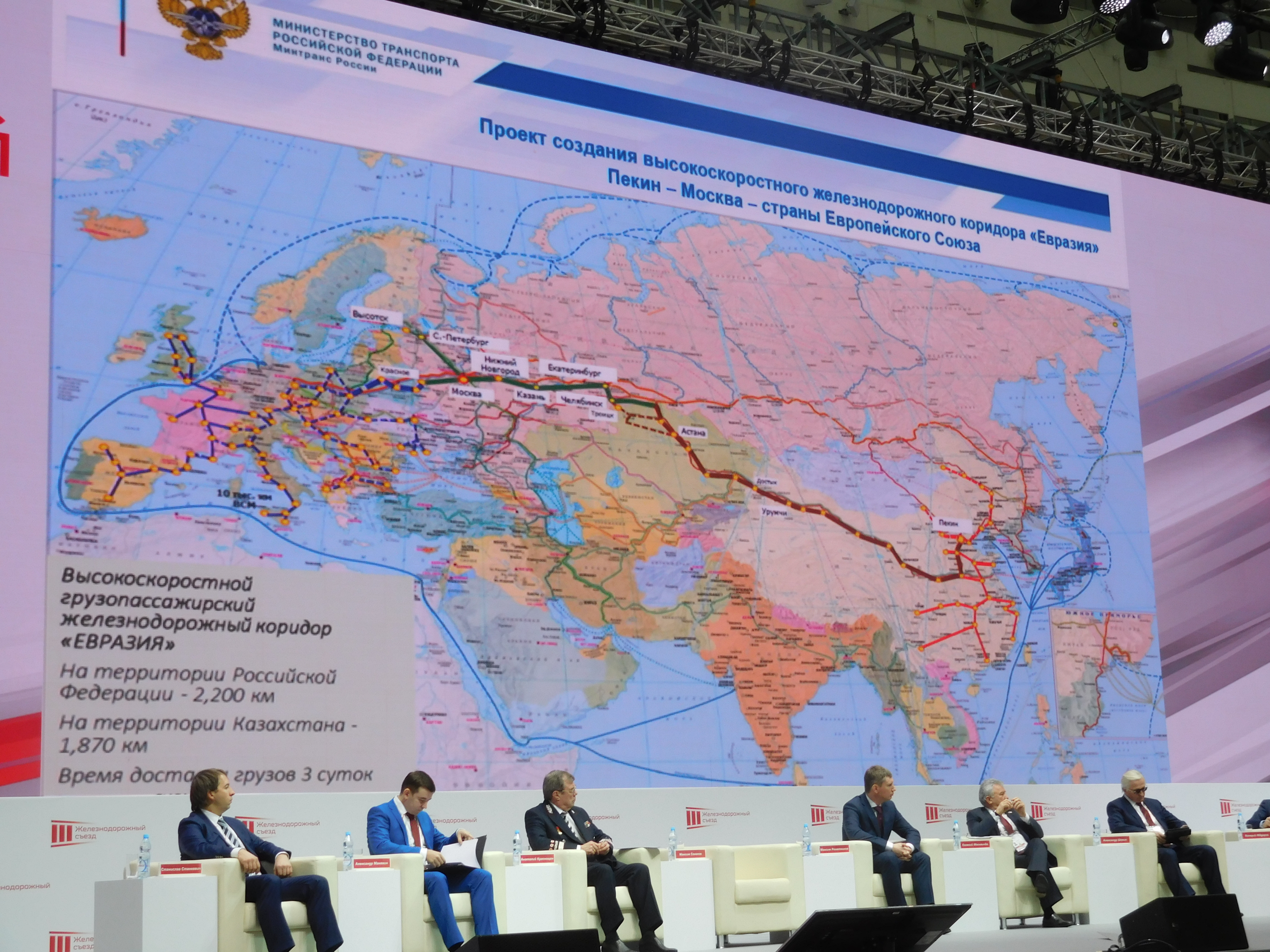
Proposed corridor for linking Asian and European rails.

Since June 1963 the Moscow–Leningrad line (ca. 650 kilometers) was serviced by a day train (Avrora) that offered a 5 hr 27 min ride with speed peaking at 160 km/h; faster speeds were not possible with heavy steel carriages and existing bogies.

Development of the higher speed passenger railway service in Soviet Russia started in 1965. First, the track and safety infrastructure was upgraded, then in 1972–1975 new aluminum cars with pneumatic suspension bogies, RT-200 (Russkaya Troyka), were designed by TVZ in Kalinin, Russia. These cars were originally supposed to be a hauled by experimental turbojet motor cars, but unfortunately this propulsion system was deemed unfeasible so the trainset was hauled by with the Czechoslovak locomotive ChS-2 and its later development ChS-200. At the time, the ChS was the fastest locomotive in the Eastern Bloc. Tests confirmed the trainset was capable of 220 km/h speed on the route, although in practice these speeds were not reached while in commercial service.

By 1973 a completely new integrated trainset, the ER-200 EMU, was designed and assembled at RVR, in Riga. It was put into service on the Moscow–Leningrad line and with due troubleshooting done during 1979–1987 its maximum speed reached 200 km/h, allowing the journey to be shortened by one hour, to 4 hrs 20 mins. Since the early 1990s its ageing parts have required extensive repairs, yet still it remained in service until 2009.

Further development of RT-200, Nevsky Express train of TVZ pulled by Czech ChS-200 locomotive, entered into commercial service in 2001, connecting two major cities in 4 hrs 10 mins at 200 km/h. It was planned for retirement, but instead was renovated, provided with newer EP-20 locomotive of Transmashholding and remains in service as the lower-cost alternative to Sapsan.

After an attempt to build a fully domestic high-speed (250 km/h) integrated trainset (Sokol) in 1993–2004 had proven a failure, the government signed an agreement with the German Siemens to supply Velaro trainsets, adapted to the Russian railway environment. EVS1 Sapsan entered into service in 2009 and by 2024 fifteen Velaro sets were in service between Moscow and St. Petersburg, forming the high speed Sapsan service.

However, due to the extensive timetable of the Sapsan service, freight services had to be moved to longer alternate routes, and many local commuter services in the St. Petersburg, Moscow and Tver areas had to be canceled or have schedule changes to accommodate the Sapsan service. Thus a project to build a new dedicated high speed rail line was revived and as of 2024, construction is underway.

From 2016 to 2020 the high-speed railway link between Moscow and Berlin was serviced by Talgo Intercity trainset, initially purchased for the Moscow–Kyiv day express train and abandoned after the Revolution of Dignity in Ukraine. In 2020 the Moscow–Berlin connection was discontinued due to the pandemic. Talgo cars were used for regular and high-speed commute between Moscow, Nizhniy Novgorod and Samara, before being stored due to the lack of technical maintenance from the manufacturer, caused by sanctions against Russia for the invasion of Ukraine.

=== Upgrades ===
In February 2010, RZD announced that it would unveil proposals in March 2010, for a new "European standard" high-speed line between St Petersburg and Moscow. The new line would be built to Russian gauge and would probably be built parallel to the existing line. At an event on 1 April 2010, it was announced that the new Moscow–St. Petersburg high-speed line would allow trains to run at speeds up to 400 km/h (249 mph). The total journey time would be cut from 3h 45m to 2h 40m. The new line was expected to make extensive use of bridges, tunnels and viaducts. Finance would be provided by a public-private finance vehicle. The line was expected to carry 14 million people in its first year, with capacity for 47 million passengers annually. Representatives from many other high-speed lines were to be consulted, in an effort to avoid construction delays and design flaws.

High-speed traffic Moscow–Nizhny Novgorod began in July 2010. Two Sapsan trains make shuttle trips between Nizhny Novgorod and Moscow, and one between Nizhny Novgorod and St. Petersburg. The latter route takes 8 hours and 30 minutes, compared to the previous 14 hours. Nevertheless, like the gradual speed increases of Afrosiyob in Uzbekistan, the line is technically not full HSR speed (below 200 km/h); the line has been undergoing upgrades as of 2018. By 2024 extension of St.Petersburg-Moscow line to N.Novgorod has been discontinued.

Apart from faster travel times, the new line would increase capacity, since the current line is congested and there is only room for a limited number of high-speed trains. It would also improve safety, since trains currently pass some level crossings at 250 km/h (155 mph). In November 2021, it was reported that the government was abandoning the proposal in favour of possible upgrades to the existing line. By 2023, the project was revived and by March 2024 construction had commenced.

== List of high-speed railway lines ==
=== Lines in operation ===
Line	Start	End	Top speed	Length	Operator	Opened
Nikolaevskaya	Moscow-Leningradsky	Saint Petersburg-Moskovsky	250 km/h (155 mph)	650 km (404 mi)	RZhD	1984

=== Lines under construction ===
Line	Start	End	Top speed	Length	Operator	Expected opening
VSM-1	Moscow-Leningradsky	Saint Petersburg-Moskovsky	360 km/h (224 mph)	679 km (422 mi)	RZhD	2029

=== Discontinued lines ===
Line	Start	End	Top speed	Length	Operator	Upgraded to HSR	Closed
Riihimäki–Sankt-Peterburg	Helsinki-Central	Saint Petersburg–Finlyandsky	200 km/h (124 mph)	197 km (122 mi)	VR, RZhD	2010	2022

Helsinki–St. Petersburg: 200 km/h (124 mph) high-speed service using Karelian Trains Class Sm6 (Allegro by Alstom) trains started on December 12, 2010, reducing travel time from 5.5 hours to 3.5 hours. The trains run at 200 km/h (124 mph) on most of the Russian part, and 220 km/h (137 mph) on a short stretch in Finland. Following the COVID-19 pandemic, and the Russian invasion of Ukraine, the service was discontinued and rolling stock decommissioned by VR for political reasons.

== Rolling stock ==
Type	Production	Number built	v_{max} [km/h]	In service	Status
Allegro (train)	2009–2011	4	220 km/h	2010-2022	retired
ER-200	1974	2	200 km/h	1984–2009	retired
Sapsan	2008 – 2014; 2021 – current	20	250 km/h	since 2009	20 in service
Sokol (train)	2000	1	250 km/h	never (experimental trainset)	retired
Strizh (train)	2014	7	200 km/h	since 2015	stored
Nevsky Express	2000	2	200 km/h	since 2001	2 in service

== New lines under consideration ==
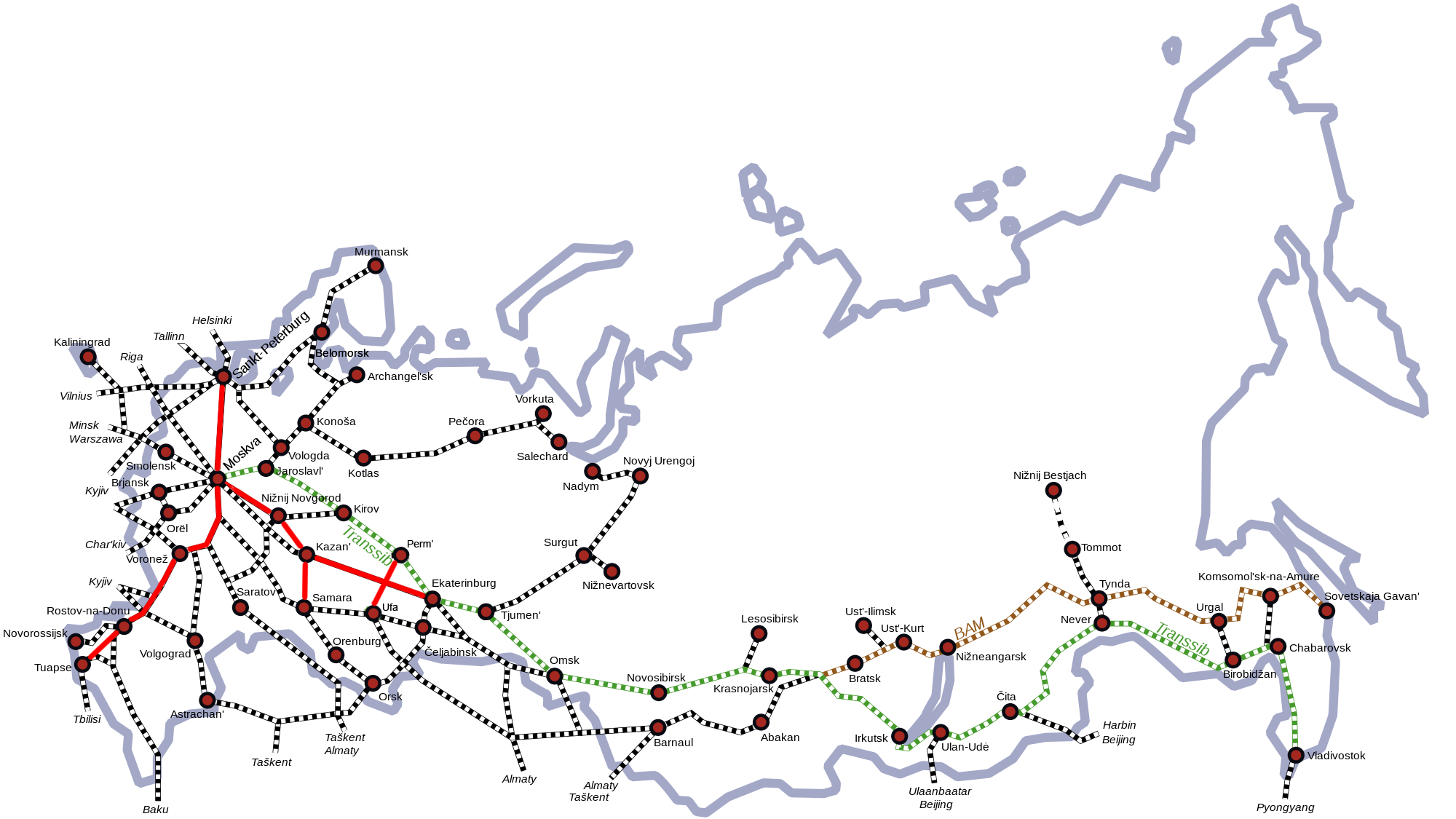
High-speed rail projects until 2030 (in red)

- Moscow–Nizhny Novgorod: This proposed leg of the high-speed rail project was originally due to open in 2024, and is 421 kilometers long. Construction has not started as of 2023.
- Moscow–Kazan high-speed railway: The call to build this 770 kilometers rail line that would connect Kazan and Moscow was first announced by President Vladimir Putin in the Economic Forum at St. Petersburg in 2013. It was to be the first true high-speed line in Russia with trains operating at up to 400 kilometers per hour. A rail trip from Moscow to Kazan which today takes a close to 13 hours trip, would be reduced to 3.5 hours. As of 2023, construction has still not begun, and president Vladimir Putin has given ambivalent answers regarding the status of the project which allude to projected lack of return on the investment.
- Moscow–Rostov line: A new line with the capacity for high-speed rail was approved due to the old line passing through Ukraine and was expected to be operational by 2018, but the project ended up having a top speed of 160 km/h, under the criteria for high-speed rail.
- Moscow–Riga: previously under consideration
- Moscow–Minsk: In 2019 a new international "high-speed" train service was announced between Minsk and Russia, but the estimated journey time of 6 hours for 700 kilometers yields a service of 120 km/h, which fails to qualify as true high-speed rail.
- In 2018 Chechen leaders requested federal financing of high-speed rail from Rostov to Krasnodar, Grosny, Maikop, Mineralnye Vody, Makhachkala, and other Northern Caucasus Republics. Preliminary cost estimates are nearly $13 billion. Economic benefits would include a new freight corridor from the Black Sea to the Caspian Sea, but some experts doubt the economic feasibility of the project.

== Criticism from rural areas ==
Since the Sapsan service between Moscow and St Petersburg shares tracks with regular passenger trains and freight trains, it has been widely reported that its introduction has resulted in the cancellation of a number of more affordable long-distance passenger and commuter trains, and long delays for many other trains that continue to run. Moreover, the numerous level crossings along the line have to be kept closed to road traffic for longer for the high-speed trains than for regular ones (the crossing is closed 15 minutes ahead of a fast train passing through); the resulting delays have been criticized by motorists and bus passengers, as well as by ambulance and fire services in towns along the railway. In some small towns dependent on commuter trains for connection with the outside world, and on level crossings for local travel, such as Chupriyanovka (Чуприяновка; population 2,500) near Tver, local officials have expressed the sentiment that "our town is cut into two halves for over seven hours each day" and that "we have been cut off from the outside world". Overall, the feeling is widespread that the new service benefits the country's moneyed elite, while severely inconveniencing the majority of the population in the regions through which the railway runs. As of 2015, the additional tracks for high-speed trains and over-crossings were built.

== See also ==
- Moscow–Saint Petersburg high-speed railway
- Moscow-Saint Petersburg railway
- Sharopoyezd
