= Nevsky Express =

Russian express train

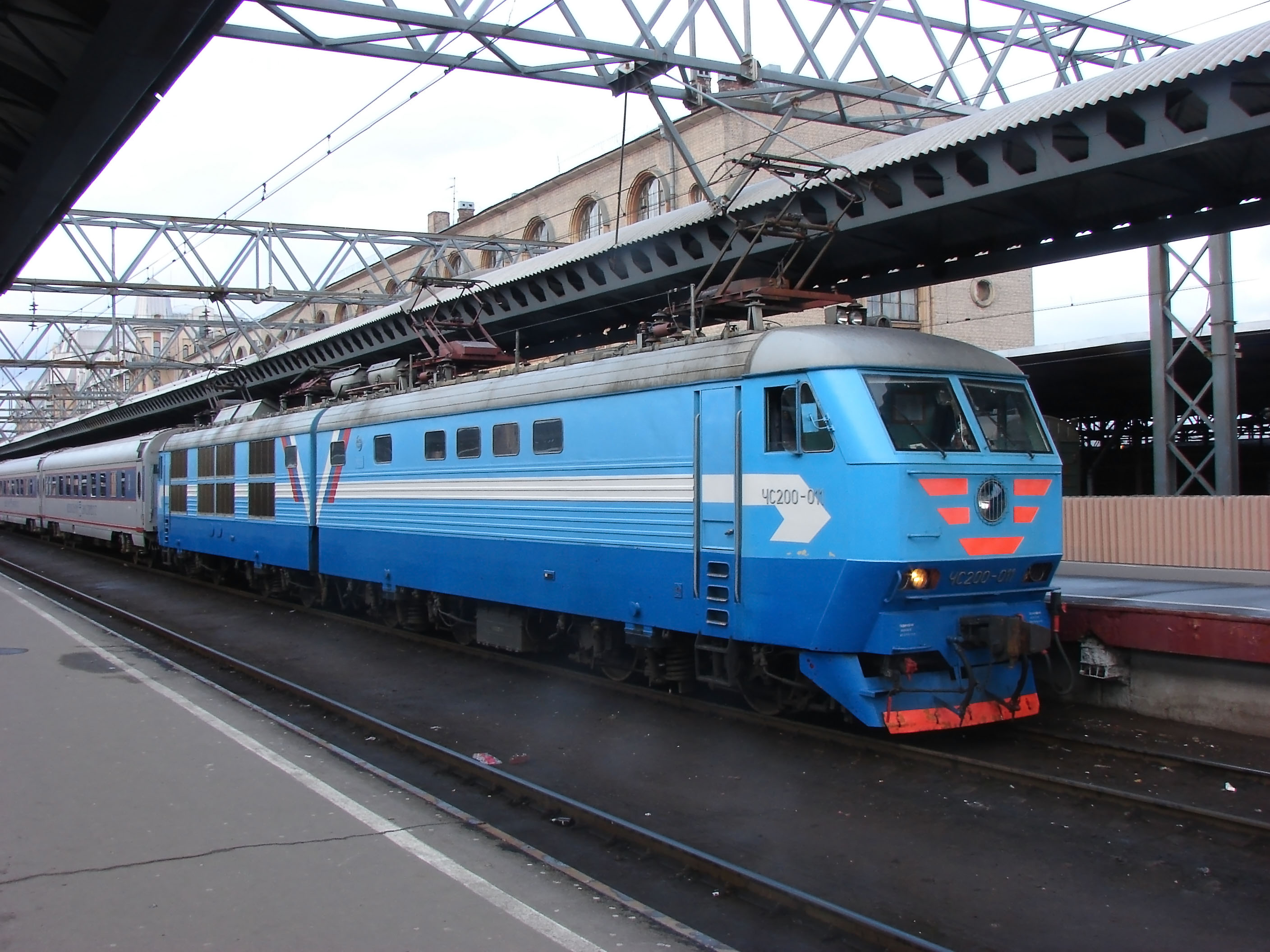
- The Nevsky Express train at Moskovsky Rail Terminal

Overview
- Service type: Express train
- Status: Operating
- Locale: Russia
- First service: 2001
- Current operator: Russian Railways

Route
- Termini: Moscow (Leningradsky Rail Terminal); Saint Petersburg (Moskovsky Rail Terminal)
- Distance travelled: 639 km (397 mi)
- Average journey time: 6 hours 15 minutes
- Service frequency: Six weekly

On-board services
- Catering facilities: Dining car

Technical
- Rolling stock: Škoda Chs200, EP20
- Track gauge: 1,520 mm (4 ft 11 27/32 in)
- Electrification: 3 kV DC
- Operating speed: 160km/h
- Track owner: October Railway (Russian Railways)

The Nevsky Express (Russian: Невский экспресс, lit. 'Neva Express') (No. 167B/168B) is a Russian Railways express train, formerly the fastest on the prominent route between the Leningradsky Rail Terminal in Moscow and the Moskovsky Rail Terminal in Saint Petersburg (the Saint Petersburg–Moscow Railway). Introduced in 2001, it used a high-speed locomotive and specially-built carriages rather than the ER200 used for all premier daytime expresses until then. The train had a maximum speed of 200 km/h (125 mph) and initially made no intermediate stops. It consists of an EP2K locomotive and a dedicated rake of carriages including a restaurant car. It features 6-person compartments in some cars and airline style seating in other cars.

The Nevsky Express was initially retired in 2009 with the introduction of the faster Sapsan high speed trains, but was reinstated the following year as a second-class-only low-cost high-speed service. The train covered the distance between Moscow and Saint Petersburg in 4 hours 10 minutes. By comparison, the Sapsan trains take between 3 hours 30 minutes and 4 hours to make the same trip. The train was again cancelled on August 27, 2021 but reinstated on April 29, 2022. On October 26, 2025, the schedule was changed to include intermediate stops at Kolpino, Tosno, Chudovo, Oklovka, Bologoye, Vyshny Volochek, Tver, and Zelenograd, and the locomotive changed from the original ChS200 or EP20 to the slower EP2K, making it only the third fastest day train on the route behind the Sapsan and Aurora.

== See also ==
- 2007 Nevsky Express bombing (Malaya Vishera)
- 2009 Nevsky Express bombing
- List of named passenger trains of Russia
