= Sokol (train) =

Prototype Russian high-speed train

ES250 (Falcon)
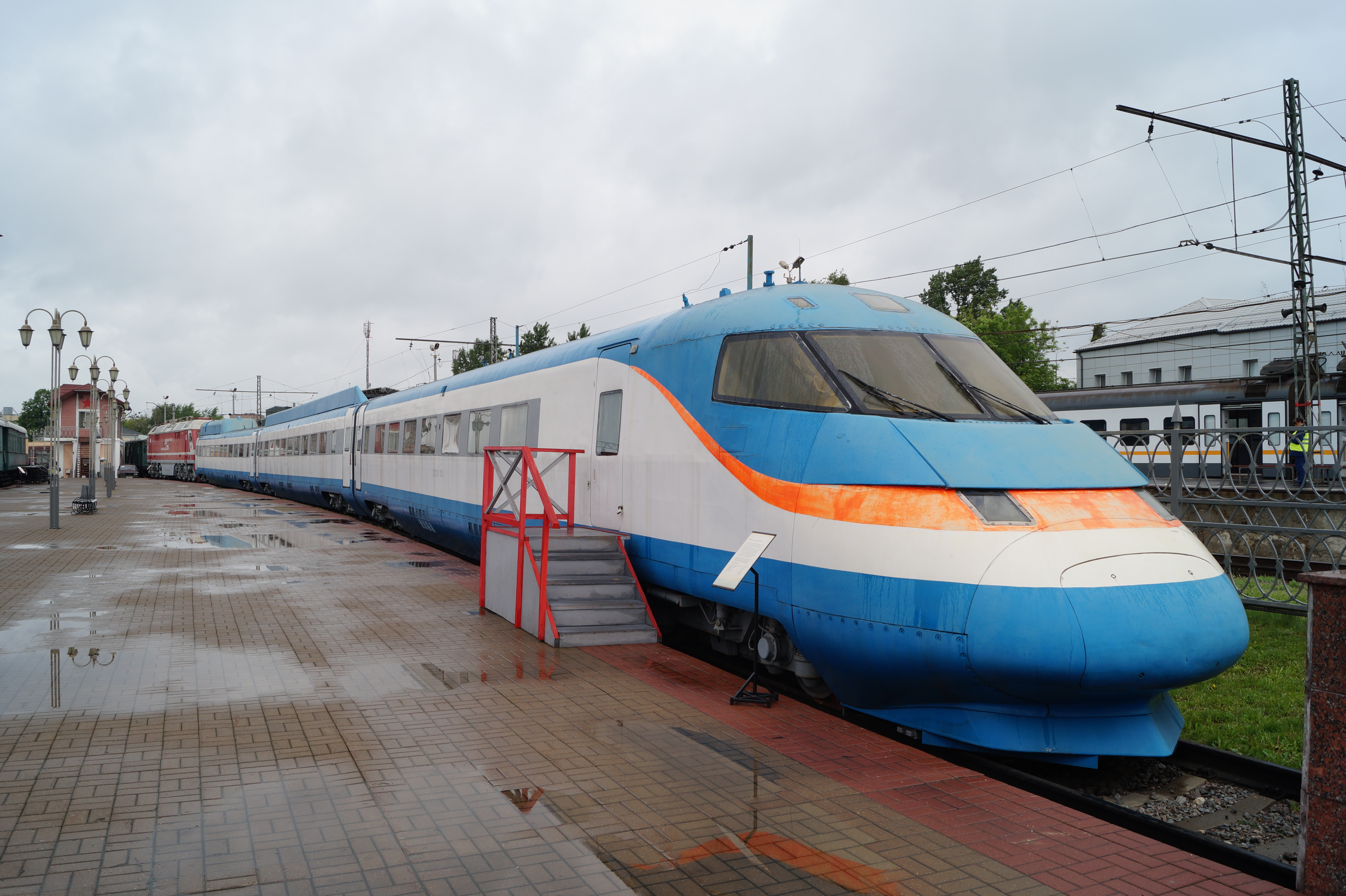
- Manufacturer: RAO VSM
- Formation: 6 cars
- Capacity: 350
- Operator: Russian Railways
- Line served: Moscow - St Petersburg

Specifications
- Car length: 26 m (85 ft 3 5/8 in)
- Width: 3.12 m (10 ft 2 7/8 in)
- Maximum speed: 250 km/h (155 mph)
- Weight: 356 t (350 long tons; 392 short tons)
- Power supply: (?)
- Electric systems: 3 kV DC; 25 kV 50 Hz AC (dual voltage units) Overhead catenary
- Current collection: Pantograph
- Track gauge: 1,520 mm (4 ft 11 27/32 in) Russian gauge

Sokol (Сокол, Russian for "falcon") was a planned high-speed train in Russia. It was to be a successor of the ER200 for use on the Moscow–St. Petersburg mainline, and was designed to operate at a cruising speed of 250 km/h. A prototype was built in 2000 and tested by Russian High Speed Railway Shareholding Co.

The Sokol project was cancelled in 2002. Instead of a Sokol-based design, high speed trainsets (named Sapsan) based on the Siemens Velaro were procured from Siemens in Germany. The Sapsan trains have been operating on the Moscow–St. Petersburg line since December 2009.
