= Sharopoyezd =

Soviet prototype high-speed transport system

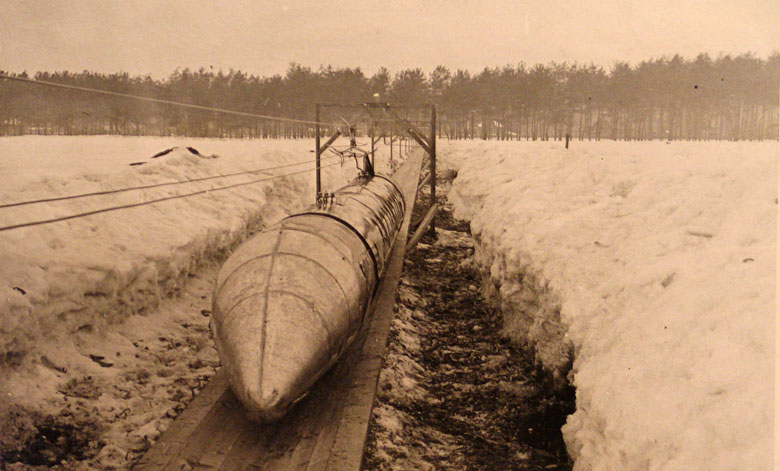
Photo of a model Sharopoyezd, 1932

The Sharopoyezd (Russian: Шаропоезд; literally "ball-bearing train"), also known as ShELT (Russian: ШЭЛТ, acronym for шаро-электро-лотковый транспорт, "ball-bearing electric trough transport") was a Soviet attempt to develop a high-speed rail system in the 1930s. Instead of iron rails, the design specified a single, large concave rail made of concrete.

== History ==
=== Background ===
The Sharopoyezd was the brainchild of Nikolai (Mykola) Yarmolchuk, a native of Lyubin who, after the Russian Civil War (in which he participated actively on the side of the Bolsheviks) settled in Kursk, where he worked as a railway fitter. After years on the job, having familiarised himself with the peculiarities of the Soviet rolling stock, Yarmolchuk came to the conclusion that for the further development of railroad transport, particularly in terms of speed, it was necessary to come up with a new concept. In his view, the flanged wheels typical of rail transport were the main obstacle, as at high speed there was a significant chance of damage to the carriage of the train due to increased beating of the wheels when turning in the axial direction. Furthermore, the friction itself caused by the flanges resulted in a slowing down of the train. Already in 1924, in order to overcome this issue, he conceived the idea of developing a single, trough-shaped rail, in which trains would run using wheels resembling spheres, as a replacement for the two-rail system. In this initial conception the carriages were expected to tilt in the appropriate direction when turning but, if the wheels were big enough, they would tilt back to the centre, preserving stability.

=== Early development ===
In the mid twenties Yarmolchuk went to Moscow in pursuit of a higher education, studying at the Moscow Higher Technical School, where he began to put his ideas in motion. After years reworking his project, the carriages became more conventional in appearance, but they were to have only two, large wheels, one at the front and one at the back. In 1929 he finally managed to attract the attention of the authorities, and under their auspices gathered a team from the Moscow Institute of Transport Engineers to build a maquette of his Sharopoyezd, which was then shown to representatives of the Narkomput, who were impressed. On that same year he applied for a state patent for his design.

The exhibition having made a positive impression on the authorities, a special Experimental Bureau of High-Speed Transport (Бюро опытного строительства сверхскоростного транспорта, also known by the acronym БОССТ) was established to develop Yarmolchuk's ideas into a high-speed transport system, and create a more advanced test model of the Sharopoyezd. This bureau worked on the project until 1931 and received special funding as well as the use of an area near the Severyanin railway platform.

=== Testing phase ===
In 1931 it was decided to test the project in a larger scale, building an initial 3 kilometre wooden model of the U-shaped rail. At this time the first doubts began to be voiced in the press and among specialists, both on account of the technical complexity of the project and of its cost, but the Sharopoyezd managed to secure the continued backing of the authorities. Between late 1931 and early 1932 the tracks were finished, and by April 1932 the first test carriage was also completed. It was a cylindrical structure with a frontal hood, of around 6 metres in length and 80 centimetres in width, with two wheels of around 1 meter in diameter, one at the front and another one at the back, each suited with an internal three-phase electric motor. By fall 1932 an additional four carriages had been built, which allowed for the testing of the entire unit. In testing the Sharopoyezd reached a speed of 70 km/h, and after successful early trials with empty carriages it was subsequently tested carrying both cargo and passengers.

In spite of the encouraging results of the trials, soon the drawbacks of the system became clear to the testers. As winter came it became evident that snow accumulated on the tracks and needed to be periodically removed. The need to build an analogue to railroad switches was also an issue that needed to be dealt with. БОССТ continued testing the Sharopoyezd until summer of 1933, while trying to elaborate solutions to these issues. These did not stop official support for the project, either, and a recommendation was issued to start work on full-size ShELT tracks.

=== Attempts at building a full-size train ===
Yarmolchuk and his colleagues worked on two train sizes, one labelled "medium" and the other "regular". The medium size train was to be used in the initial experimental runs, and then be used as a commuter train. The medium size model would have wheels of around 2 metres in diameter, a capacity of 82 seats per carriage, and travel at a speed of up to 180 km/h. The regular size version, by contrast, would have wheels of 3.7 metres in diameter, over 100 seats per carriage, and travel at speeds of up to 300 km/h. Special aerodynamic breaks were to be introduced for this model.

On August 13, 1933, the Soviet of People's Commissars ordered the construction of the first Sharopoyezd line. After some debate in regards to its ending point, the options being Zvenigorod and Noginsk, it was decided that the circumstances made building the line to the latter town more feasible. The starting point would be Izmaylovo, to link the new high-speed train with the Moscow tram and metro systems.

=== Collapse of the project ===
Before construction could begin, a new analysis of the project by specialists flagged some unresolved issues with the Sharopoyezd, putting the program on hold. Potential problems with safety were highlighted, especially in conditions of snow and ice, which could result in derailment and, given the speeds involved, numerous victims. A second issue was financial, as doubts emerged as to whether the significant costs of construction were justified by the benefits. Finally, the complexity of the task also proved to be an obstacle. If initially it was thought that building tracks out of concrete would be simpler than laying traditional rails, practice showed that the need for reinforced concrete tracks made this process far less straightforward than initially thought. The construction of the carriages themselves was also no less complex, and there was difficulty and great expense in acquiring or manufacturing the engines required to keep the wheels of the Sharopoyezd rolling, and even in manufacturing the wheels themselves.

On account of these issues, it was decided to shelve the project indefinitely. The test tracks were cleared, the press quietly stopped covering the issue, and by 1934 references disappeared from the public eye. Perhaps ironically, in 1935 the patent for his design was granted, but by then official interest in the project had waned.

== Aftermath ==
In the 1950s Yarmolchuk, who continued his career as an engineer, led a group of young technicians from the Bauman district House of Pioneers in Moscow in developing a new model of the Sharopoyezd that was presented at the 6th World Festival of Youth and Students. His attempts to once more interest the authorities in the project, however, were unsuccessful. Museum exhibits, excerpts from the Soviet and international press, and newsreel footage are all that remains today from the project.

Yarmolchuk died in April 1979. The Soviet Union would have to wait until 1984 for its first high-speed train model, the ER200, to enter service. Today there are high-speed train services in Russia linking Moscow and Nizhniy Novgorod, Moscow and Saint Petersburg, and Saint Petersburg with Riihimäki in Finland (the latter suspended as a result of the Russian invasion of Ukraine).

== See also ==
- High-speed rail in Russia
