= Moscow–Kazan high-speed railway =

Railway line under construction in Russia

Moscow–Kazan High-Speed Railway ВСМ Москва – Казань
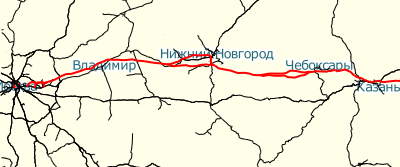
- Proposed routes

Overview
- Status: Proposed
- Locale: Russia
- Termini: Moscow Yaroslavskaya railway station; Kazan
- Stations: 15

Service
- Type: High-speed rail
- Services: Moscow–Vladimir–Nizhny Novgorod–Kazan (–Vladivostok/Beijing/India)
- Operator(s): Russian Railways

Technical
- Line length: 762 km (473 mi)
- Number of tracks: 2 Russian gauge
- Track gauge: 1,520 mm (4 ft 11 27/32 in) Russian gauge
- Loading gauge: Russian T
- Electrification: 25 kV 50 Hz AC overhead lines 3 kV DC overhead lines inside of the Greater Ring of the Moscow Railway
- Operating speed: up to 350 km/h (217 mph)

The Moscow–Kazan high-speed railway is a planned 772-kilometre long high-speed railway line connecting the cities of Moscow and Kazan in the Russian Federation, going through the intermediate cities of Vladimir, Nizhny Novgorod and Cheboksary. The project had an original expected completion date of 2018 (as of 2013), and Government of China intended to make the project the first segment of transnational high-speed railway that connect Beijing and Moscow over a distance in excess of 7,000 kilometres. Planning work was finished in September 2017. Preliminary construction on stations and platforms, with space reserved for the railway, started in spring 2018. Construction on the railway has been postponed as of March 2020, due to the high cost (estimated at 1.7 trillion rubles) and in lieu of further studies on ridership. As of 2025, the construction has still not started.

== Details ==
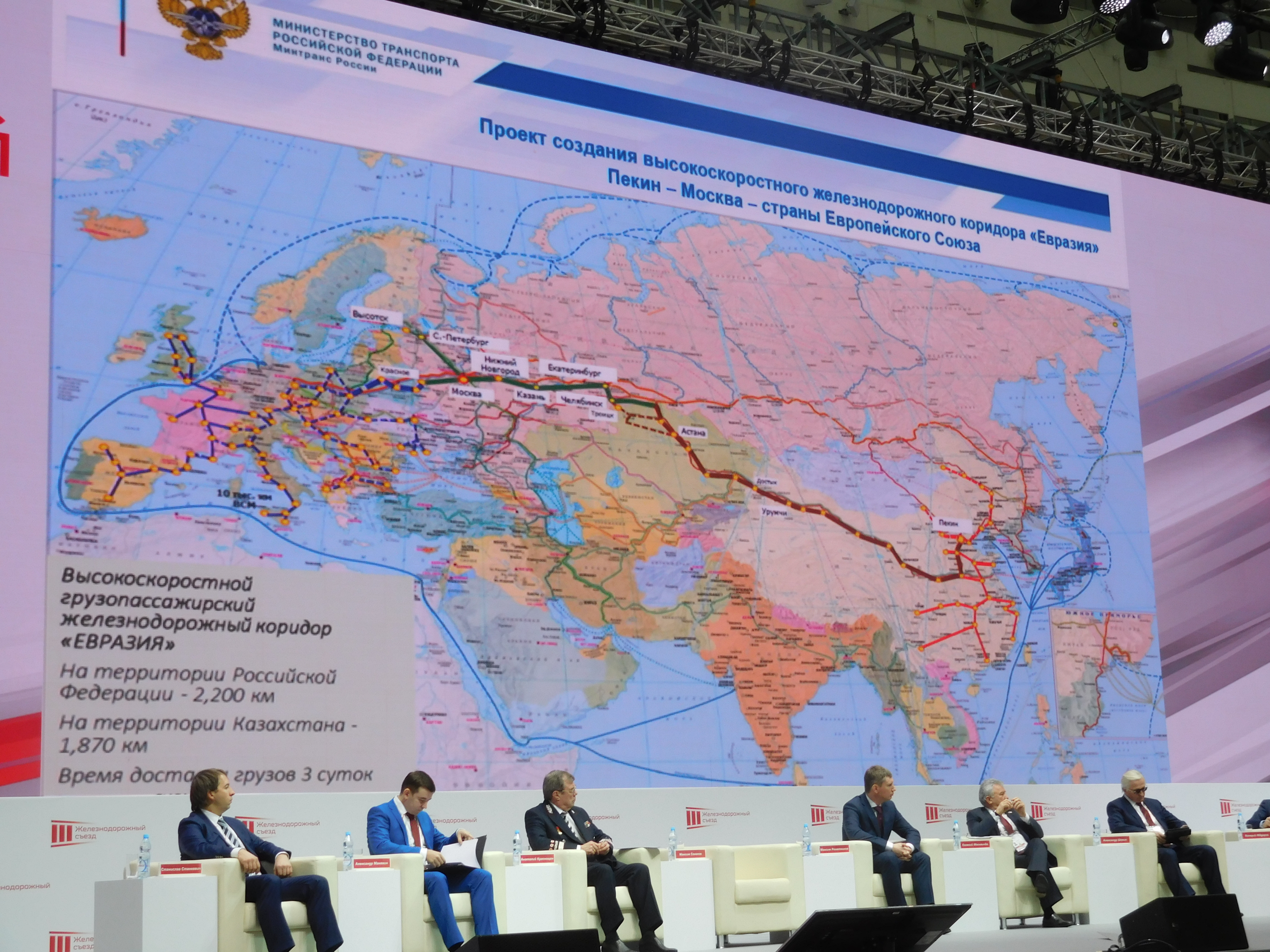
Proposed corridor for linking Asian and European rails.

- Route: Moscow – Vladimir – Nizhny Novgorod – Kazan (- Vladivostok/Beijing)
- Route length: 762 km
- Track gauge: 1,520 mm (4 ft 11 27/32 in) Russian gauge
- Number of tracks: 2 Russian gauge tracks
- Electrification: 25 kV 50 Hz AC overhead lines (with 3 kV DC overhead lines inside of the Greater Ring of the Moscow Railway)
- Loading gauge: Russian T loading gauge
- Platform heights: 200 mm (7.9 in) and 550 mm (21.7 in)
- Future travel time Moscow – Kazan: 3 hours 17 minutes.
- Avg speed: 235 km/h

== Rolling stocks ==
Proposed rolling stocks for this line which include:

- Talgo AVRIL Russian-gauge version
- Sapsan trainsets, which need to be modified including retractable steps for low platforms and main transformers for AC overhead lines
- Shinkansen-based trainsets, with Russian gauge and low doors

== See also ==
- High-speed rail in Russia
