= Strizh (train) =

Russian express train

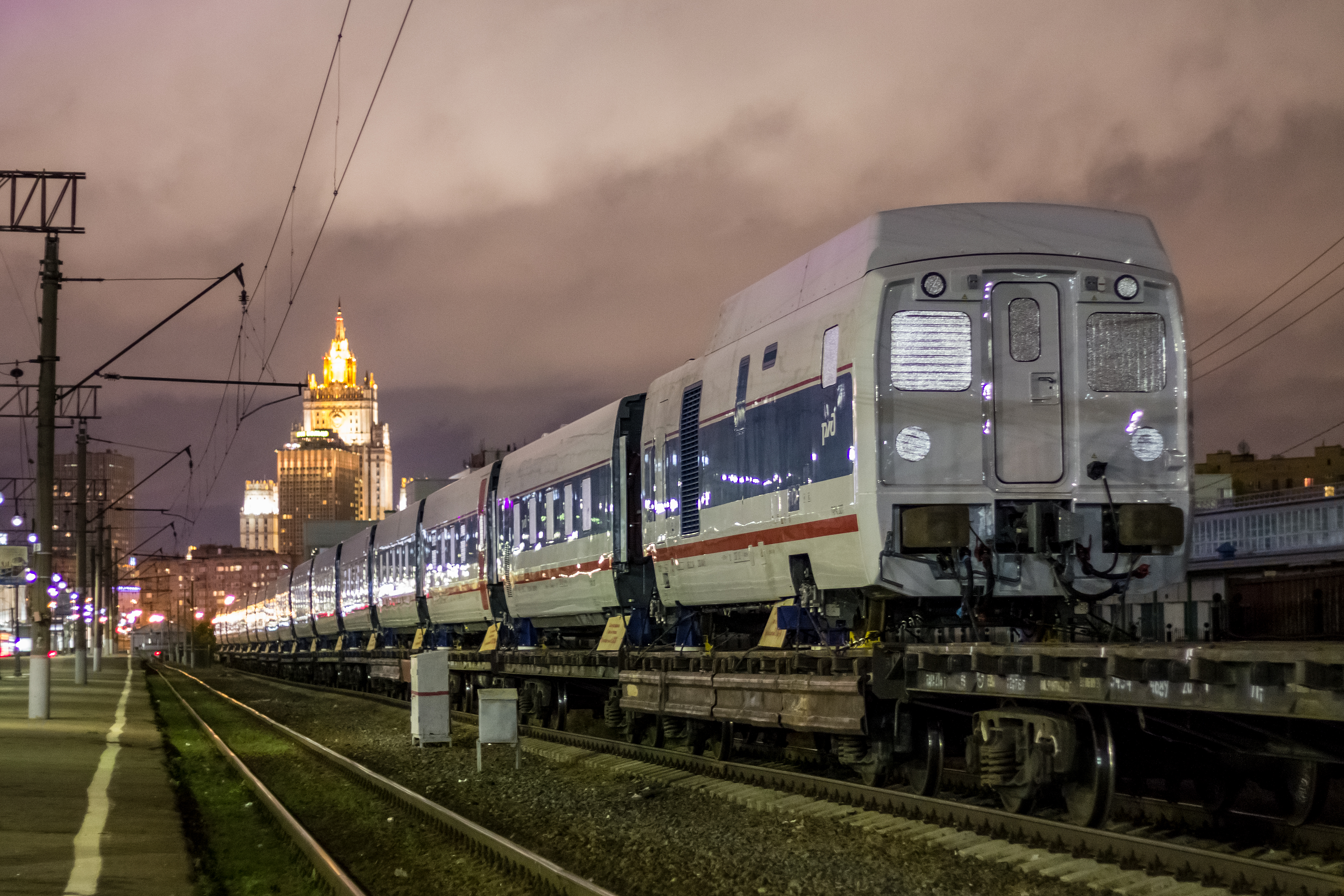
- In service: 2015–2022
- Manufacturer: Talgo, Transmashholding
- Family name: Talgo (Talgo 6)
- Formation: 18 passenger cars, 2 diesel-generator cars
- Capacity: 414 (short-distance train); 216 (long-distance train)
- Operators: Russian Railways
- Lines served: Moscow Railway; Gorky Railway

Specifications
- Car length: 13.88 m (45 ft 6 in) (passenger car); 12.2 m (40 ft 0 in) (diesel-generator car)
- Width: 2.9 m (9 ft 6 in) and 3.2 m (10 ft 6 in)
- Height: 4.4 m (14 ft 5 in)
- Floor height: 760 mm (29.9 in)
- Platform height: 200 mm (7.9 in) and 550 mm (21.7 in)
- Maximum speed: 200 km/h (124 mph)
- Weight: 667 t (656 long tons; 735 short tons)
- Prime mover(s): EuroSprinter; EP20
- Electric system(s): 3 kV DC/15 kV 16.7 Hz AC/25 kV 50 Hz AC overhead line
- UIC classification: 1+1+1+1+1+1+1+1+1+1+1+1+1+1+1+1+1+1+1+1+1
- Safety system(s): KLUB-U
- Track gauge: 1,520 mm (4 ft 11 27/32 in) Russian gauge convertible Variable gauge Talgo to 1,435 mm (4 ft 8 1/2 in)

The Strizh (Russian: Стриж, lit. 'Swift') is a Russian locomotive-hauled, low-floor, high-speed express train.

== Main information ==
The trains have been running between Moscow and Nizhny Novgorod since 1 June 2015 and between Moscow and Berlin since 17 December 2016. On the Moscow – Nizhny Novgorod line, they make 1 to 3 stops, linking the two cities in 3 hours 35 minutes (when they only stop in Vladimir). The cars are pulled by an EP20 locomotive.

In 2016, Russian Railways also connected Moscow and Berlin using the Strizh. The travel time between the two cities is a little over 20 hours.

== Lines ==
Previously the train was in operation on international line:

- Moscow – Berlin (via Smolensk, Minsk, Brest and Warsaw)
- Moscow – Nizhny Novgorod (via Vladimir, Kovrov and Dzerzhinsk)
- Saint-Petersburg – Samara (via Moscow, Vladimir, Kovrov, Dzerzhinsk, Nizhny Novgorod, Arzamas, Saransk, Syzran)

=== Moscow – Nizhny Novgorod line ===
The Strizh trains run between Moscow and Nizhny Novgorod since 1 June 2015. They make 1 to 3 stops on the line: in Dzerzhinsk, Kovrov and Vladimir. The travel time between Moscow and Nizhny Novgorod is between 3 hours 35 minutes, when it stops only in Vladimir, and up to 3 hours 50 minutes with 3 stops. The cars are pulled by an EP20 locomotive.

Another fast train, the Lastochka ("Swallow") operates on the same line but makes 6 stops: in Orekhovo-Zuyevo, Vladimir, Kovrov, Vyazniki, Gorokhovets and Dzerzhinsk, travelling between Moscow and Nizhny Novgorod in 4 hours 6 minutes.

Running of Strizh trains in Russia was terminated in March 2022 due to sanctions.

=== Moscow – Berlin line ===
The Strizh trains were in operation between Moscow and Berlin from 17 December 2016 until 15 March 2020. Later this international route was canceled due to the COVID-19 pandemic and closing of borders between countries. The length of the line was 1,896 km (1,178 mi).

The initial schedule was 2 trains per week, between Moscow Kurskaya and Berlin Ostbahnhof, linking both stations in 20 hours 14 minutes westbound (instead of 24h 49min previously) and 20 hours 35 minutes eastbound (compared with 25h 56min previously). The trains left from Moscow on Saturdays and Sundays, and from Berlin on Sundays and Mondays. They made intermediate stops in Smolensk, Orsha, Minsk, Brest, Terespol, Warsaw, Poznań, Rzepin and Frankfurt (Oder).

The Strizh trains to/from Berlin left and arrived at the Moscow Smolenskaya station (also called Moscow Belorussky) instead of Moscow Kurskaya. Between June 2017 and June 2019, some modernization work on a 100 km (62 mi) railway section between Warsaw and Poznań forced the trains to take a detour. After this renovation the speed limit was 160 km/h (99 mph) on all the length of this section.

Moscow and Berlin were also connected once weekly by the non-Strizh trains from the Moscow–Paris line, which depart from Moscow on each Wednesday evening and from Berlin on each Saturday morning. These trains, using RIC wagons, link both cities in about 24 hours.

A departure of the Strizh train hauled with EP20 electric locomotive from Kursky Rail Terminal in Moscow

A trip in a long-distance version of train from Moscow to Berlin

A Strizh train on the Saint Petersburg — Samara line hauled with EP20 locomotive

== Media ==
=== Locomotives, used in operation ===
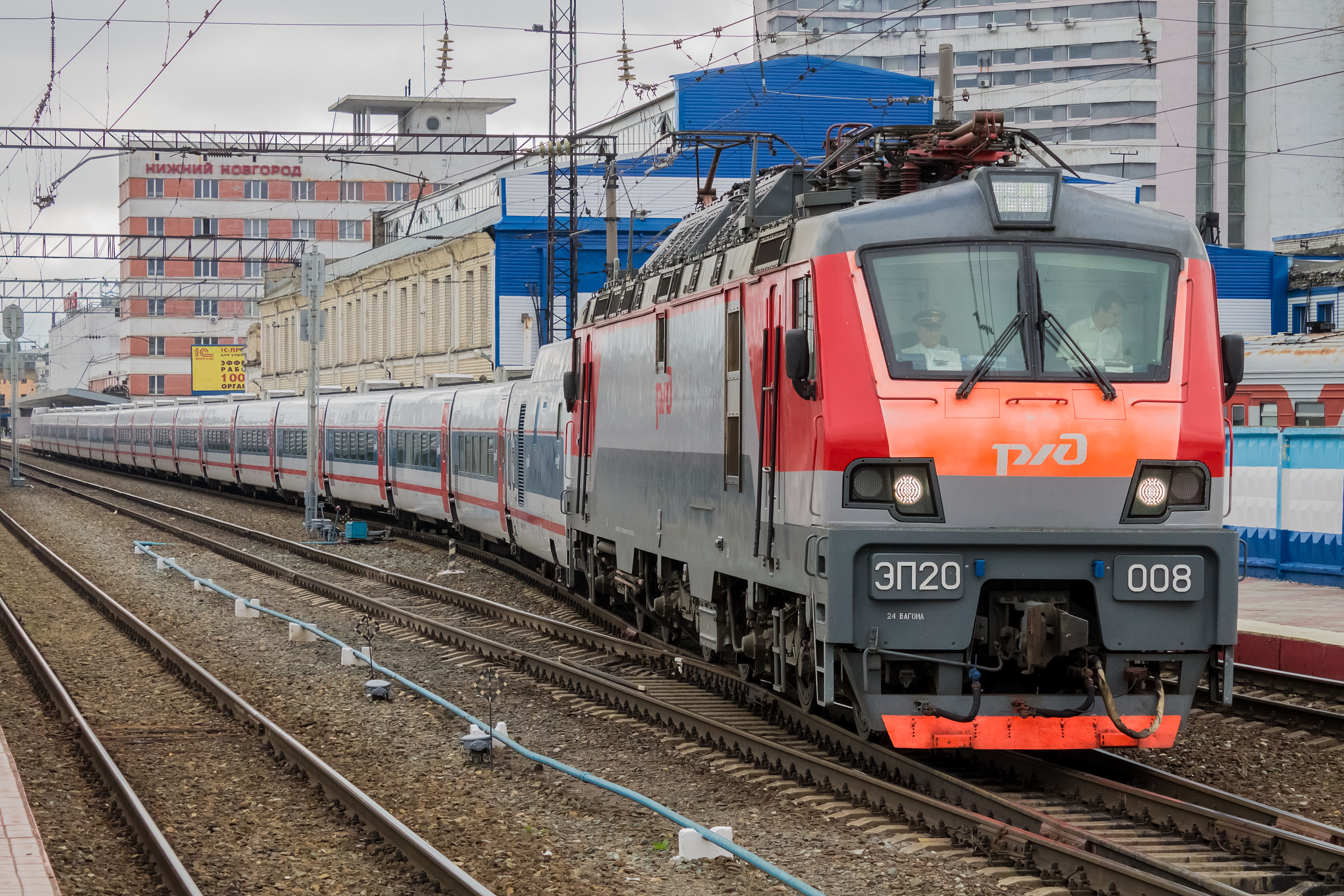
Electric locomotive EP20 with Strizh train

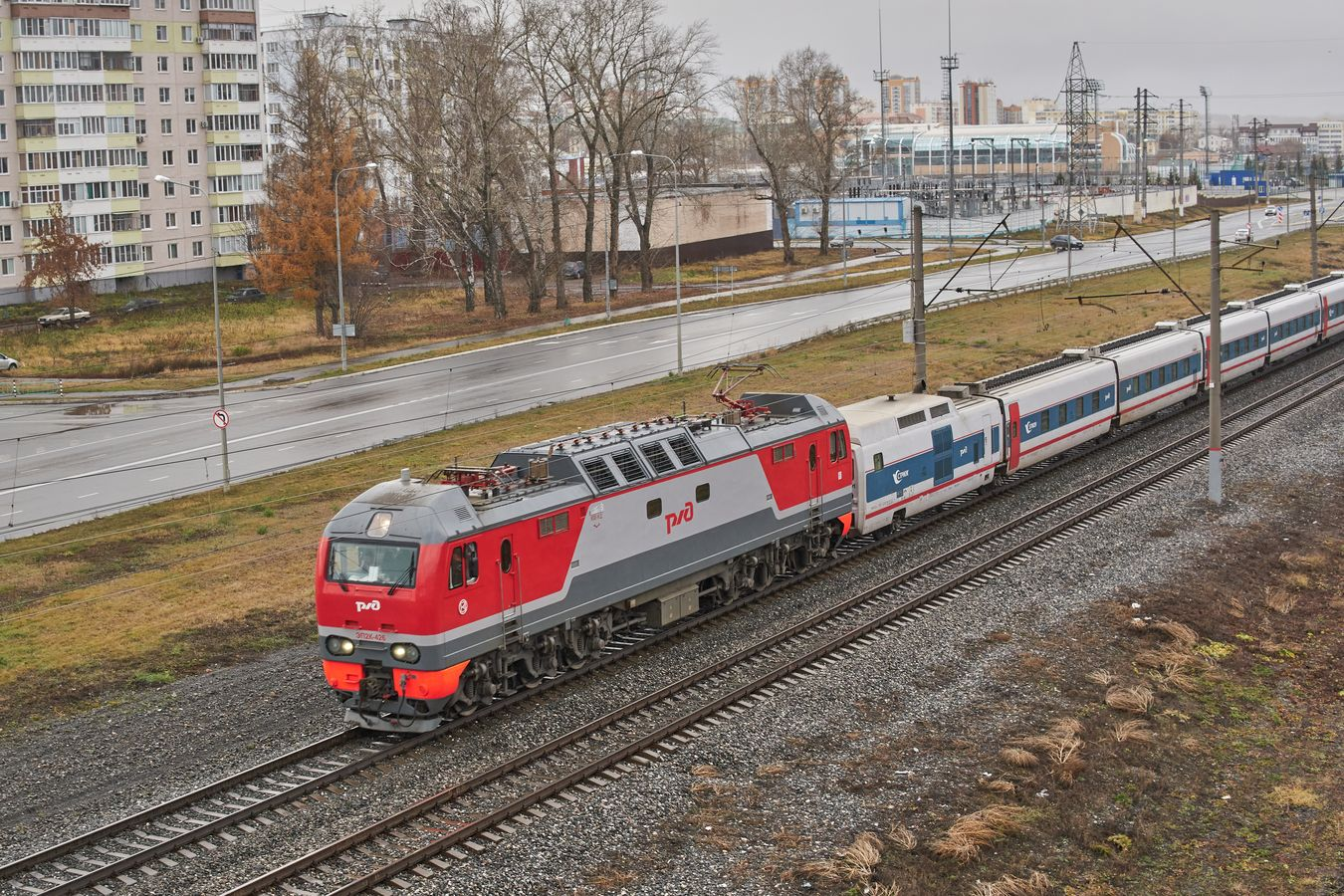
Electric locomotive EP2K with Strizh train

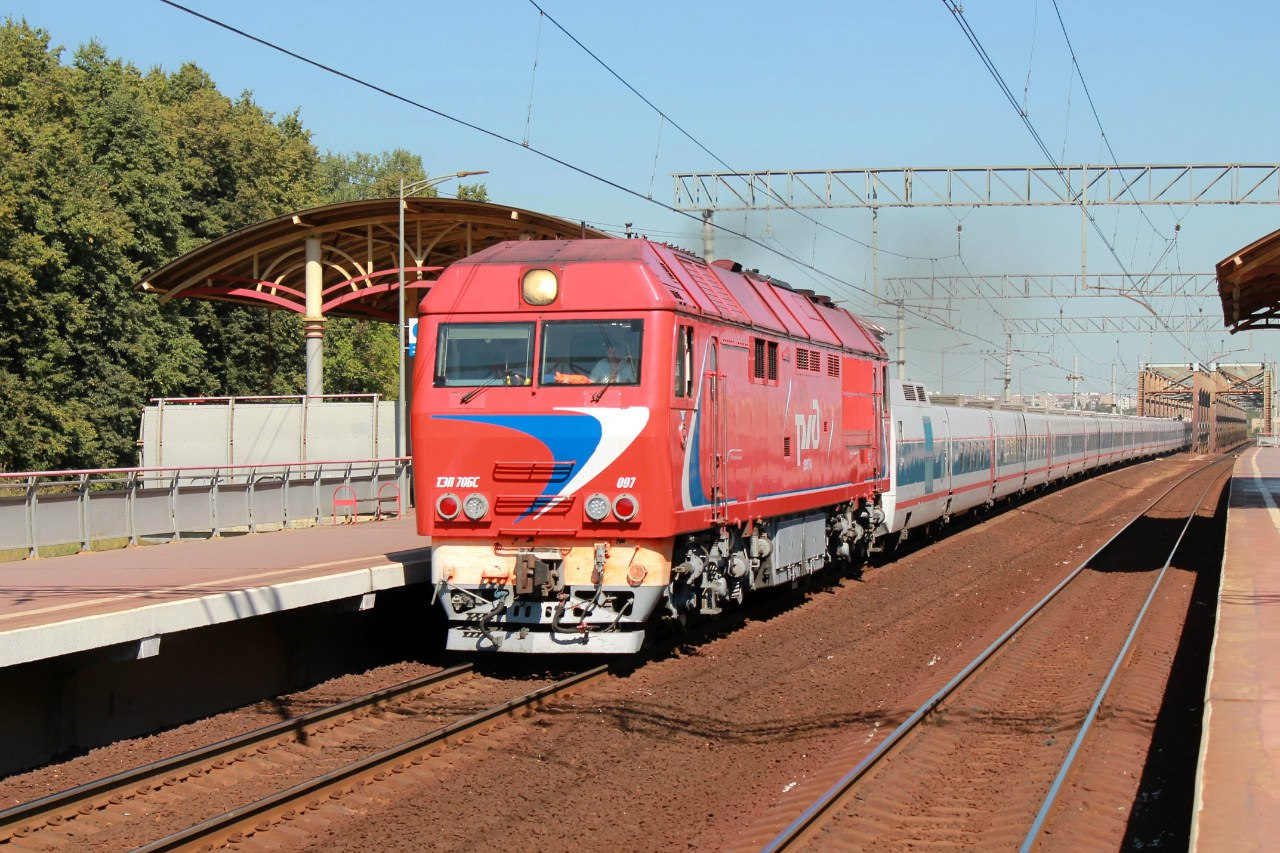
Diesel locomotive TEP70BS with Strizh train

=== Interiors ===
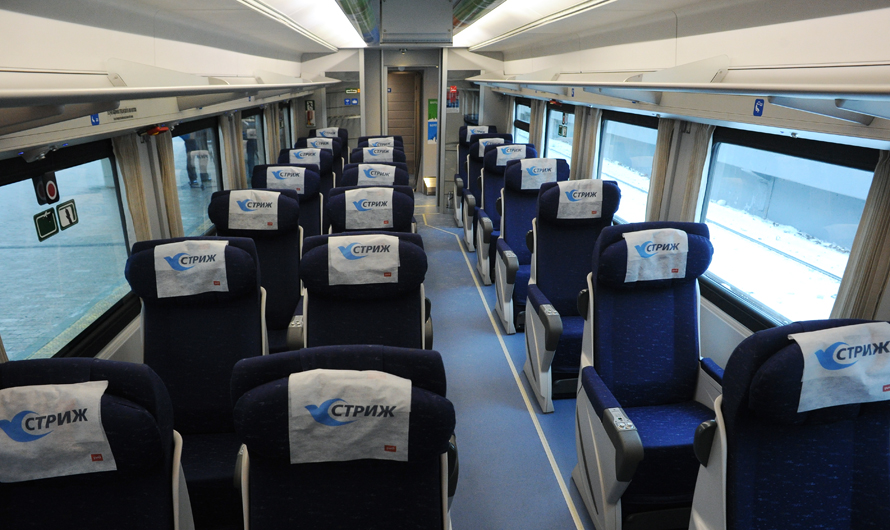
An open coach with 1st class seats

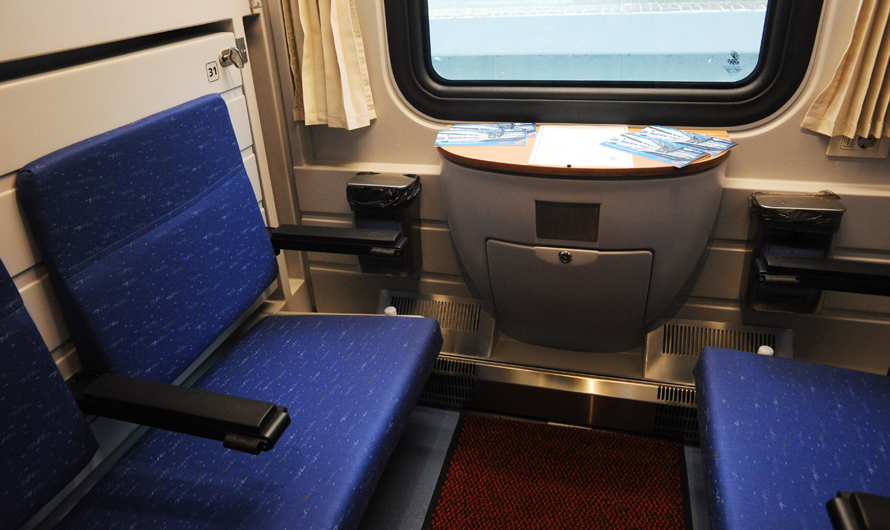
A couchette car with 2nd class places

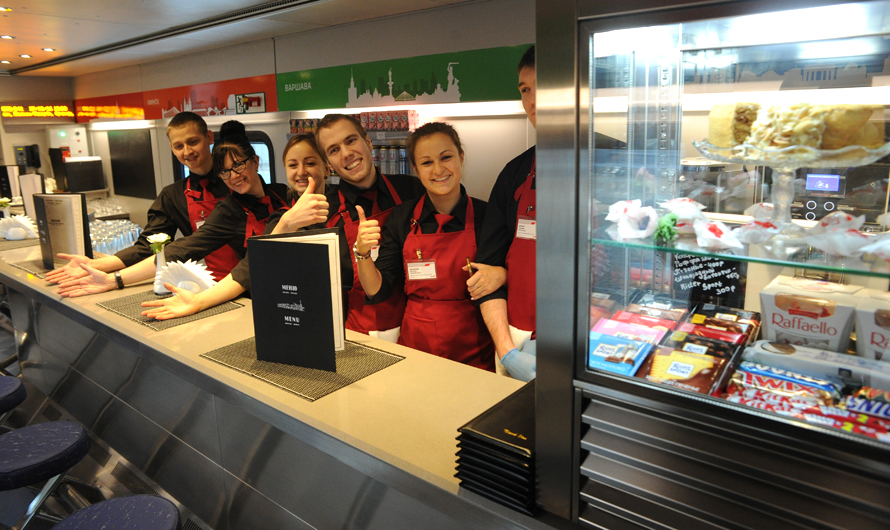
A bar car

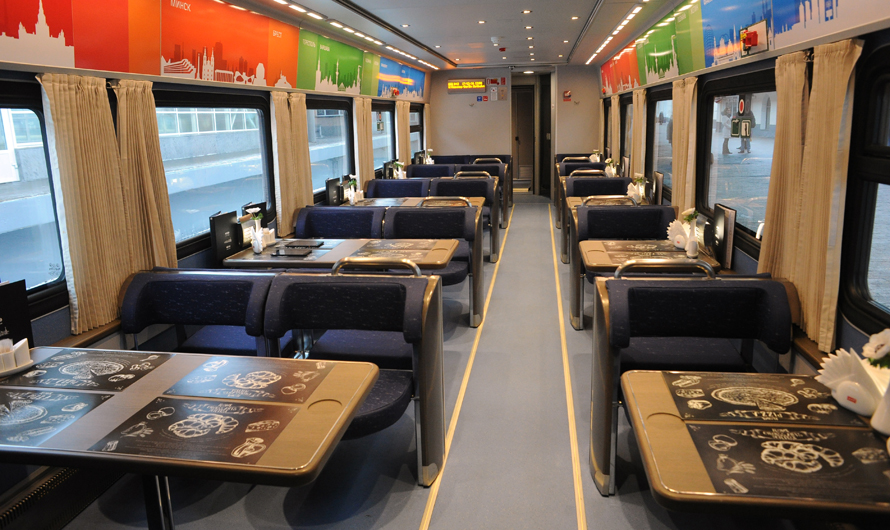
A dining car

== See also ==
- Sapsan
- Lastochka
