= EP20 =

Class of Russian electric locomotives

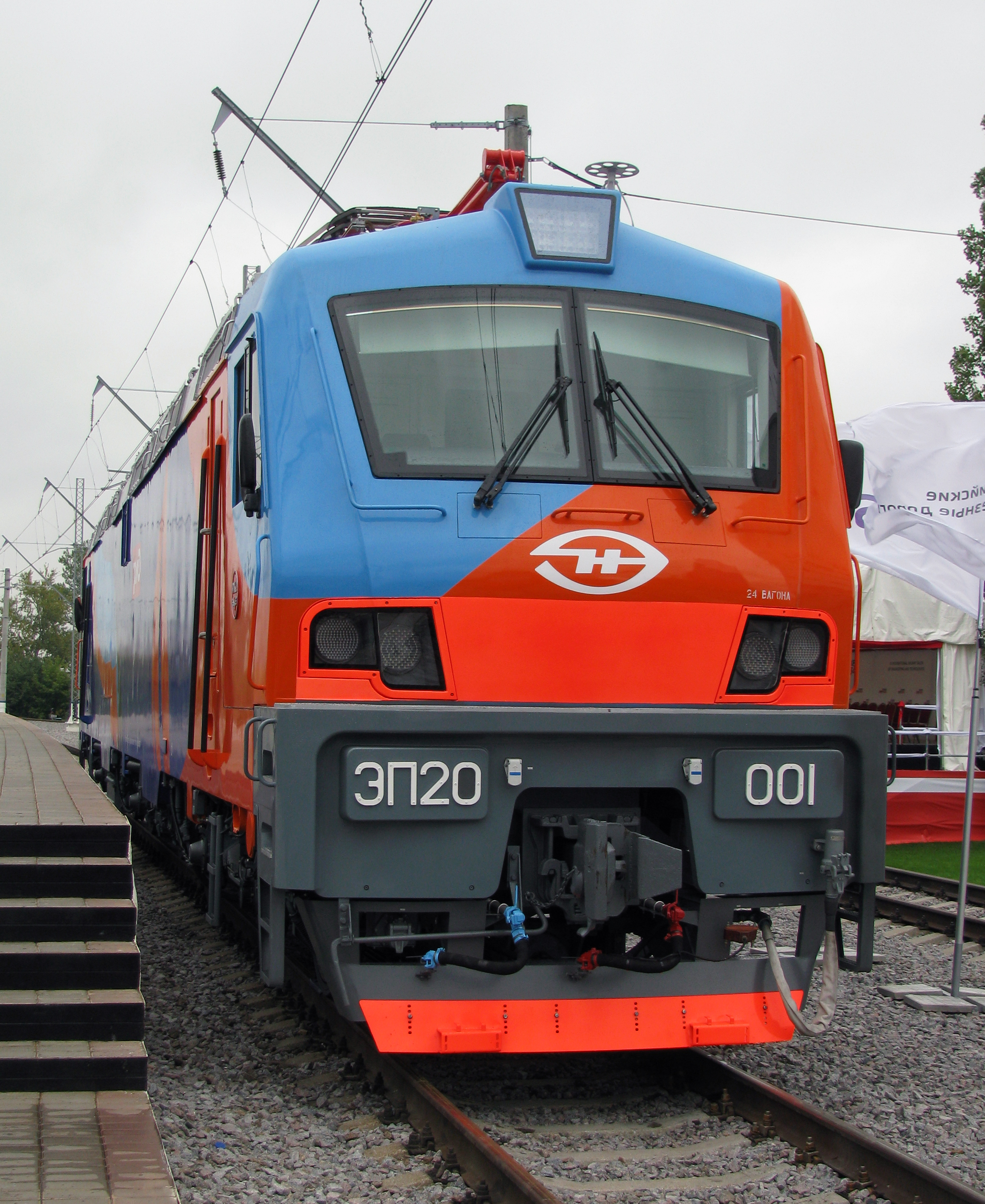
- EP20-001 (delivered in 2011)
Type and origin
- Power type: Electric
- Designer: TRTrans (Transmashholding / Alstom / VELNII)
- Builder: Novocherkassk Electric Locomotive Plant
- Total produced: 80 (December 2021)
Specifications
- Configuration
  - UIC: Bo'Bo'Bo'
- Gauge: 1,520 mm (4 ft 11 27/32 in) Russian gauge
- Wheel diameter: 1,280 to 1,200 mm (50.4 to 47.2 in) (new/worn)
- Minimum curve: 125 m (410 ft)
- Length: 22.532 m (73 ft 11.1 in)
- Width: 3.100 m (10 ft 2.0 in)
- Height: 5.100 m (16 ft 8.8 in) (pantograph down)
- Loco weight: 135 t (133 long tons; 149 short tons)
- Electric system/s: 25 kV 50 Hz AC / 3 kV DC
- Current pickup: Pantograph
- Traction motors: Bogie suspended six pole 1.2 MW (1,600 hp) asynchronous DTA-1200A
- Transmission: Six IGBT traction converters Bogie mounted traction motors, via gear to hollow shaft drive, with flexible couplings
- Train heating: 1200 kW
- Loco brake: Rheostatic 4500 kW (DC)/ 3200 kW (AC), regenerative 6000 kW, electropneumatic wheel disc
Performance figures
- Maximum speed: 200 km/h (124 mph)
- Power output: hourly : 7,200 kW (9,655 hp) continuous : 6,600 kW (8,900 hp)
- Tractive effort: 350 kN (0-74 km/h) 115 kN at 200 km/h
Career
- Official name: ОЛИМП (Olympus)
- Source: (Parkhomenko, Beregovaya & Pernička 2012, p. 85), except where noted

The EP20 (ЭП20) is a type of 6 axle Bo'Bo'Bo' electric passenger locomotive being built for the Russian Railways by Transmashholding's Novocherkassk Electric Locomotive Plant. The locomotive was designed by TRTrans, a joint venture between Transmashholding and Alstom.

An order for 200 locomotives was placed in 2010, and the first production unit formally presented in 2012.

== Design ==
The EP20 was developed by an Alstom/Transmashholdingjoint venture TRTrans, established in Novocherkassk, by French, Belgian, and Russia based engineers.

One specification for the design was the ability to haul 24 coaches at 160 km/h or 17 coaches at 200 km/h on straight level track.

The EP20 has a modular design. The locomotive body consisted of an underframe and sidewalls, with removable roof segments, and separately manufactured cab units. The driving cab modules were sourced from PKPP MDC (Ukraine); the cab design included a progressive deformation steel cage for impact absorption, and incorporated heating and air-conditioning. Access was via side doors in the main bodyshell, accessed via cab unit rear doors. PKPP MDC also supplied washrooms (2 per unit), incorporating a retention toilet system supplied by EVAC.

The locomotive body had a central corridor connecting the end cabs, with equipment located on either side. The electrical system included four pantographs (2 for DC, 2 for AC). For AC drive a body mounted 9.3 MW transformer outputs 6 separate traction outputs at 1650 V, and a separate heating winding. The 1650V output is rectified to 3000 V DC; under 3 kV operation the input is connected directly through an intermediate diode four quadrant chopper. DC smoothing is via 8.550 MW rated inductances located under the locomotive. The DC link supplies six IGBT three phase inverters (grouped in three sets of two, one set per bogie), each driving a traction motor. The system allows individual axle control including anti-slip, as well as electrical dynamic braking.

The traction motors are three phase asynchronous machines (DTA-1200 model, developed by NEVZ). They are suspended in the bogies and decoupled from the non-rotational motions of the driving wheels. (Note: A design known as Gealaif, or in Russia, a third class traction motor drive system. ("Gealaif" refers to an AEG trademarked drive design: GEA from AEG company; and laif lokomotivantrieb mit integriertem fahrmotor.) The connection between motor and reduction gear is via a diaphragm coupling, and the gearbox output drives a hollow shaft connected to the axle via a flexible coupling.

The bogie suspension system consisted of coil primary suspension, and flexicoil secondary suspension with anti-hunting and anti-rocking dampers. Tractive forces from bogie to locomotive were transferred via traction rods connected to a low lying connection at the bogie pivot centre. Mechanical braking was by wheel mounted disc brakes. Electric braking is either up to 4.5MW rheostatic braking via roof mounted resistors, or up to 7.2MW regenerative braking.

The locomotives are designed to operate in winter conditions down to −50 °C (−58 °F), and incorporates underframe snowplows.

The locomotive design was proposed as the base for a number of design variants: a single unit dual voltage freight variant E20, and dual unit dual voltage freight variant 2ES20, as well as single voltage DC and AC machines. Additional variants with a design derived from the EP20 are freight and passenger 4 axle Bo'Bo' based machines.

== History ==
By 2007 Russian Railways had identified a need for 230 units of a series of new electric locomotive, designated EP20; at that time Transmashholding was seeking a foreign partner to form a joint venture for the production of the locomotives. In late 2007 TMH entered into a joint venture with Alstom; the cooperation between the two companies was later extended, leading to Alstom taking a 25% stake in TMH in 2009.

In May 2010, RZD placed an order for 200 EP20 locomotives, to be supplied in the period 2011 to 2020. The first locomotive was presented at Expo 1520 in Moscow in September 2011.

In February 2013, Transmashholding and Russian Railways signed a 40-year contract for maintenance of the EP20.

=== Production ===
The first of the production series of the EP20 was official handed over in late 2012, at a ceremony attended by Dmitry Medvedev, and high officials of Alstom, Transmashholding, RZD and V. Golubev, Governor of the Rostov region. The delivery rate to Russian Railways is expected to be of the order of 3 per month. The locomotives were expected to be used on for the 2014 Winter Olympics on Moscow-Sochi trains.

The first 36 units had much of the electrical equipment (some auxiliary units, circuit breakers, transformer, and electronic control for the traction system) supplied by Alstom from, and integrated into new standardized locomotive platform developed by Transmashholding, the remainder also will be supplied by TMH, and the locomotives assembled at TMH's Novocherkassk plant. The initial batch of locomotives had pantographs from Faiveley, transformer and DC inductors from ABB, disc brakes from Knorr Bremse, and mechanical drive (gear, hollow shaft) from Henschel Antriebstechnik.

A joint venture between Alstom and TMH, "RailComp" will establish a production site at Novocherkassk to supply traction drives for the remaining 164 units of the order.

In 2013 Voith was awarded a contract to supply the mechanical part of the traction drives (SEH-525 single stage helical gear to hollow shaft drive) for 164 units (804 drives).

=== Testing ===
EP20-001 began testing at VELNII's test track at Novocherkassk in April 2011 and later at the Shcherbinka test track. In April 2012 certification testing began on the Belorechenskaya to Maykop line (see North Caucasus Railway). A second prototype EP20-002 began testing in October 2011. Test runs at 200 to 220 km/h (120 to 140 mph) took place on the October Railway in mid-late 2012.

== Gallery ==
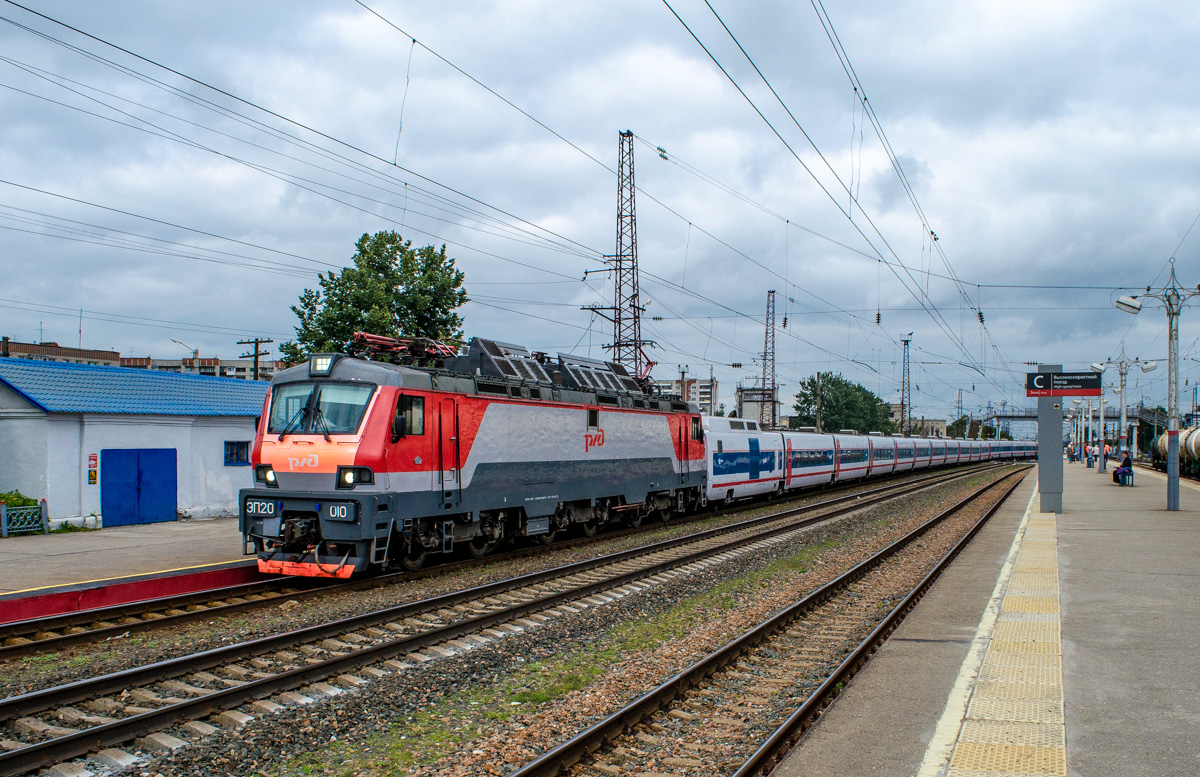
EP20 with Strizh (train)

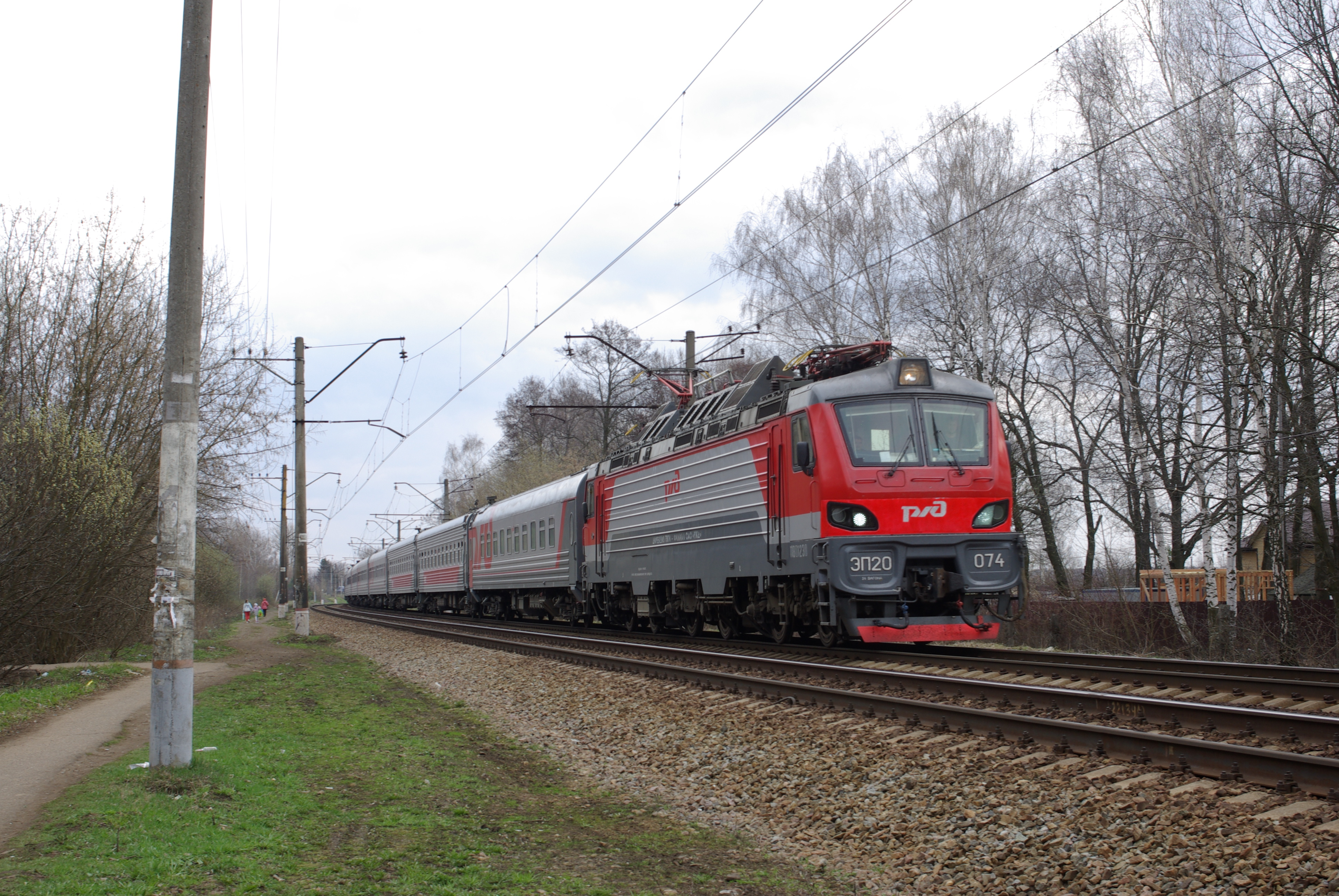
Updated EP20-074
