= Sapsan =

Russian gauge high speed electric express train

EVS1/EVS2 Sapsan
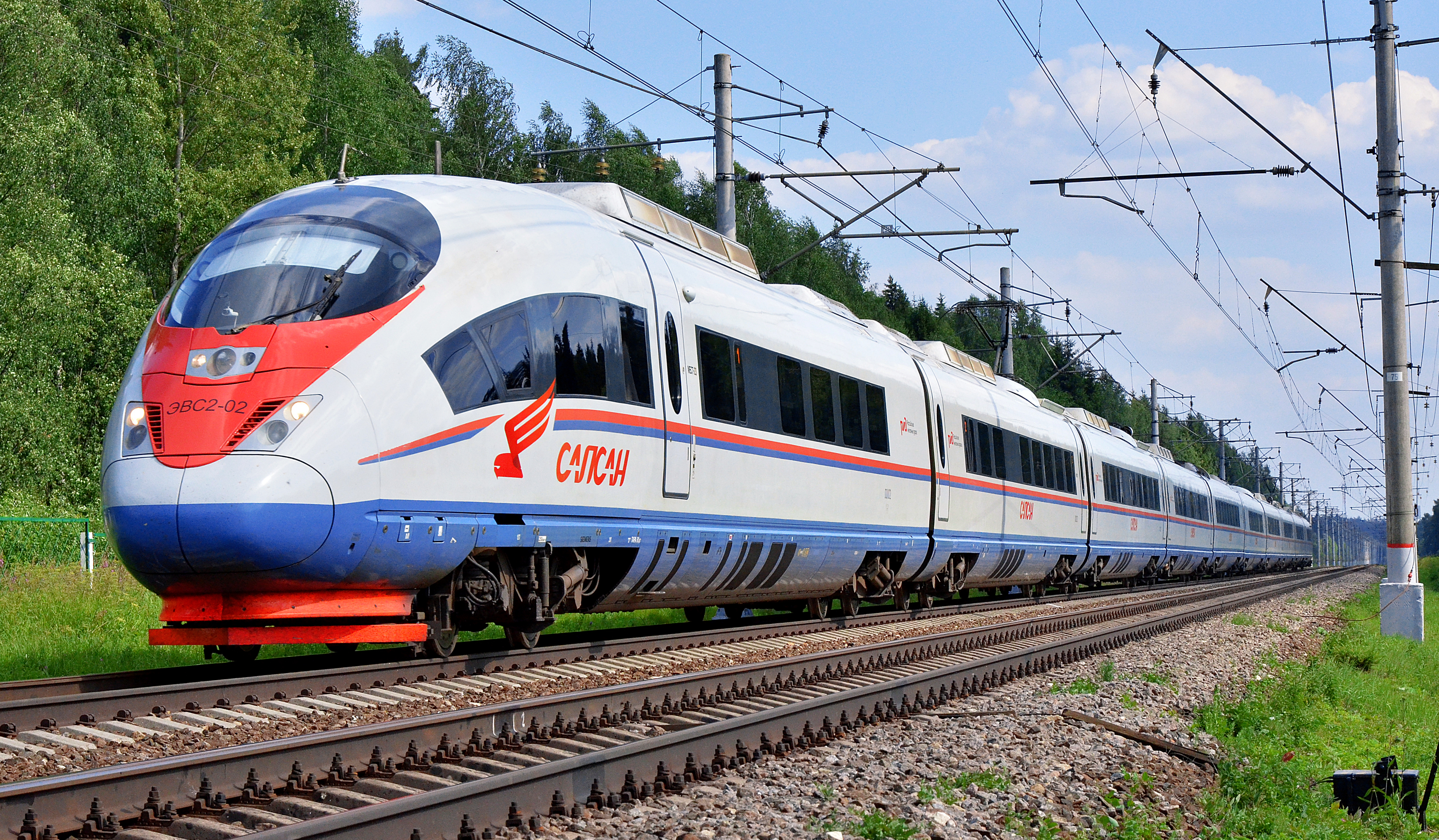
- Siemens Velaro RUS (Sapsan) en route from Moscow to Saint Petersburg
- In service: 2009–present
- Manufacturer: Siemens
- Family name: Siemens Velaro
- Formation: 10 / 20 cars
- Capacity: 604 / 1208
- Operator: Russian Railways
- Lines served: October Railway; Moscow Railway; Gorky Railway

Specifications
- Train length: 250 m (820 ft 2 1/2 in)
- Car length: 25.535 m / 24.175 m
- Width: 3.265 m (10 ft 8 1/2 in)
- Height: 4.4 m (14 ft 5 1/4 in)
- Floor height: 1.36 m (53.5 in)
- Platform height: 1,100–1,300 mm (43.3–51.2 in); 200–550 mm (7.9–21.7 in) (EVS2 only; delivery in 2015 onward)
- Maximum speed: Service: 250 km/h (155 mph); Upgradeable to: 350 km/h (220 mph)
- Weight: 667 t (656 long tons; 735 short tons)
- Traction system: Asynchronous induction motors
- Power output: 8,000 kW (11,000 hp)
- Tractive effort: 328 kN (74,000 lb_{f}) (starting); 296 kN (67,000 lb_{f}) @ 97 km/h (60 mph) (continuous)
- Electric systems: EVS1: 3 kV DC; EVS2 (dual voltage units): 3 kV DC / 25 kV 50 Hz AC; Overhead catenary
- Current collection: Pantograph
- UIC classification: Bo′Bo′+2′2′+2′2′+Bo′Bo′+2′2′ +2′2′+Bo′Bo′+2′2′+2′2′+Bo′Bo′
- Safety system: KLUB-U
- Track gauge: 1,520 mm (4 ft 11 27/32 in) Russian gauge

The Sapsan (Russian: Сапсан, lit. 'Peregrine Falcon'), also known as Velaro RUS EVS, is a Russian gauge high speed electric express train. The train is a Siemens Velaro model, which in turn is based on the ICE 3M/F high-speed trains manufactured by Siemens Mobility for Russian Railways (RZD). The trains started regular service on the Saint Petersburg–Moscow Railway in December 2009, at a maximum speed of 250 km/h (155 mph) and journey time of four hours between Moscow and Saint Petersburg.

On 22 March 2022, following the 2022 Russian invasion of Ukraine, Siemens suspended its contract to supply additional trainsets, as well as announcing it would end maintenance and other services from 13 May 2022, with Russian Railways stepping in to continue their maintenance.

== Construction history ==
On 18 May 2006, Siemens and Russian Railways signed a €276 million order for eight high-speed trains with a 30-year service contract worth around €300 million.

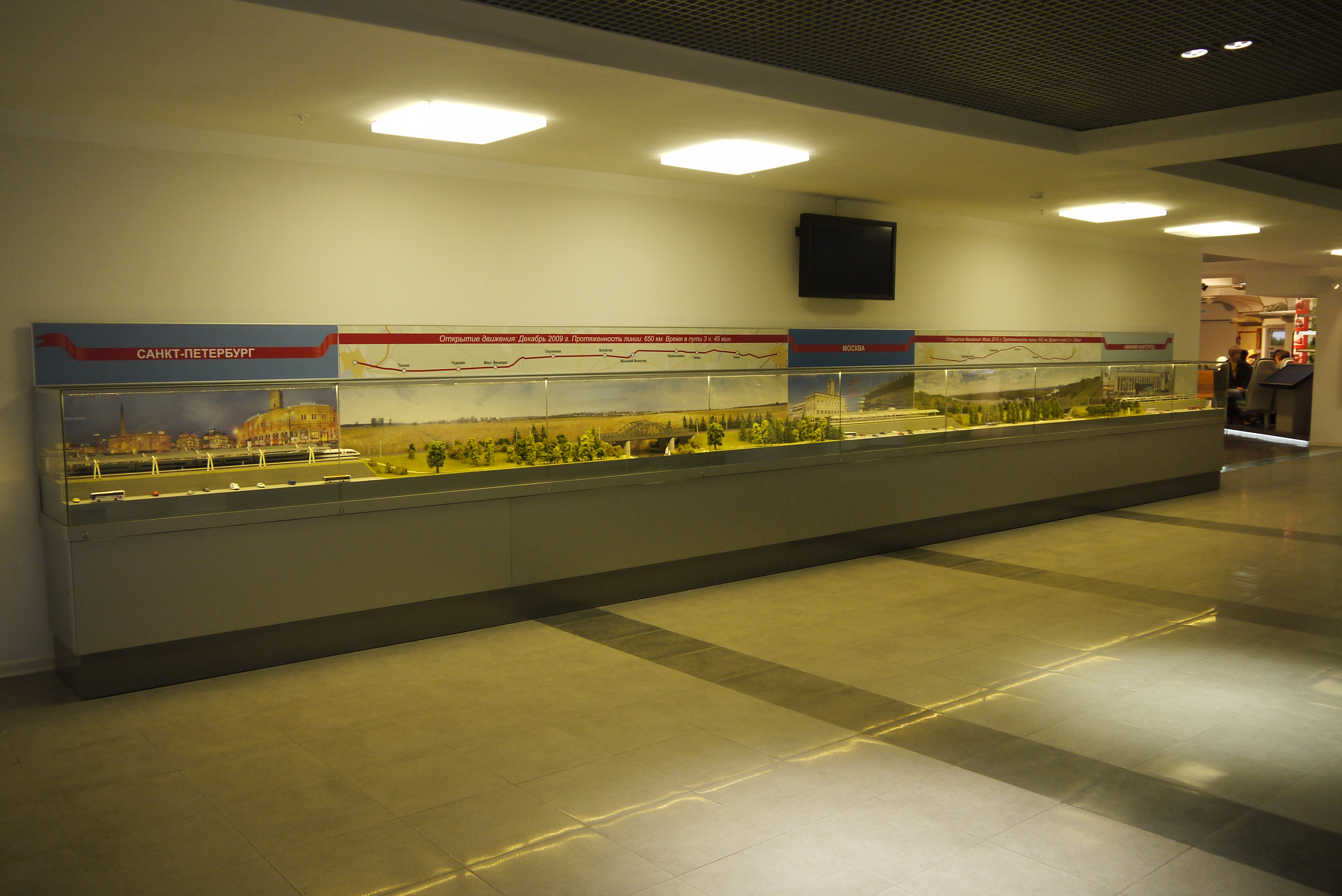
OO gauge model railway featuring the Sapsan train on the Moscow – Saint Petersburg Railway and Moscow to Nizhny Novgorod Railway in the Museum of the Moscow Railway, Moscow.

The trains were ordered to connect Moscow with Saint Petersburg and later Nizhny Novgorod at a speed of up to 250 km/h (155 mph). They are derived from the German ICE 3 train but with bodies widened by 330 mm (13.0 in) to 3,265 mm (10 ft 8.5 in) to suit Russia's wide loading gauge. Four of the trains (EVS2) are equipped for both 3 kV DC and 25 kV 50 Hz AC operation. The total length of each ten-car train is 250 m (820 ft 3 in), carrying up to 600 passengers.

Development and construction were carried out by Siemens at Erlangen and Krefeld in Germany. In August 2009, it was announced that the fifth Sapsan had been delivered to Russia, of the eight that were planned.

Four single-voltage ("EVS1", 3 kV DC powered, trainsets 5-8) trains entered passenger service at the end of 2009 on the Moscow – St Petersburg route, with the dual-system trains (EVS2, trainsets 1-4) entering service on the Nizhny Novgorod route on 30 July 2010.

Sapsan set records for the fastest train in Russia on 2 May 2009, travelling at 281 km/h (175 mph) and on 7 May 2009, travelling at 290 km/h (180 mph).

On 19 December 2011, a €600 million order for an additional twenty trainsets including eight EVS2 sets was signed in order to facilitate an increased number of services on existing lines and the expansion of new service elsewhere in the system. The second-batch EVS1 sets (trainsets 9-20) will be same details as the first-batch EVS1 sets, but the second-batch EVS2 sets (trainsets 21 onward) will have retractable steps suited for low platforms, unlike the first-batch EVS2 sets.

== Operations ==
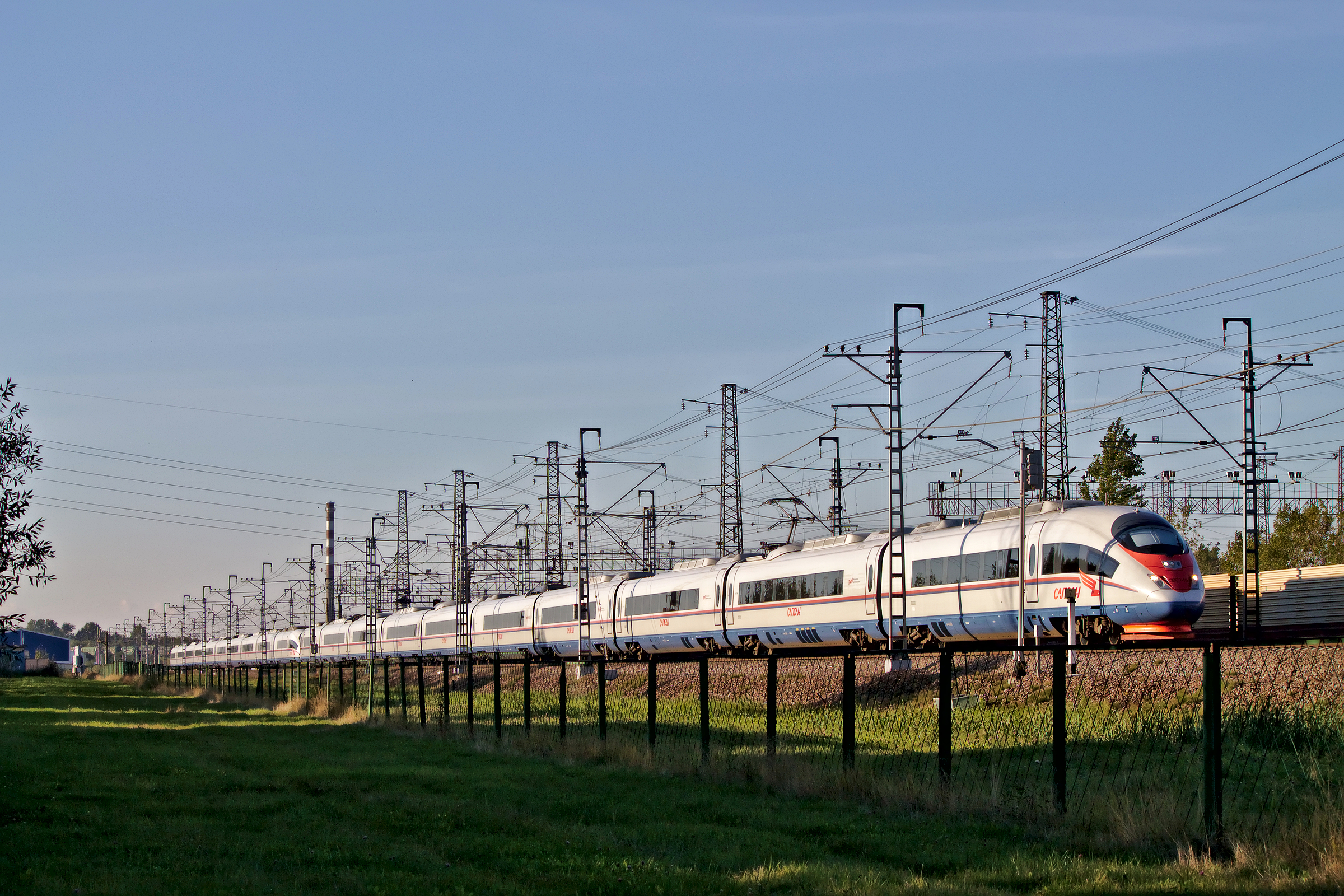
500 meters version on a route Moscow — Saint Petersburg

According to the timetable valid from 30 October 2011, the direct train from Moscow to St Petersburg without intermediate stops needs 3 hours 40 minutes, the train from Moscow to Nizhny Novgorod 3 hours 55 minutes.

Introduction of Sapsan initially caused cancelation of affordable daytime trains between Moscow and St Petersburg. Since the end of 2012, Moscow – St Petersburg daytime trains other than Sapsan have been running again.

New bridge crossings were built, platforms along the railway were reconstructed and an additional track was completed in 2015. New Lastochka commuter trains were introduced on the Moscow – Tver and St Petersburg – Bologoye routes. Local trains in the rural areas were saved.

=== Wagon layout ===
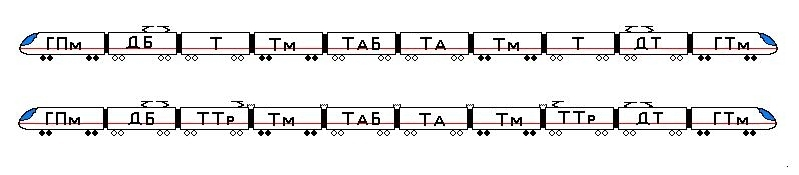

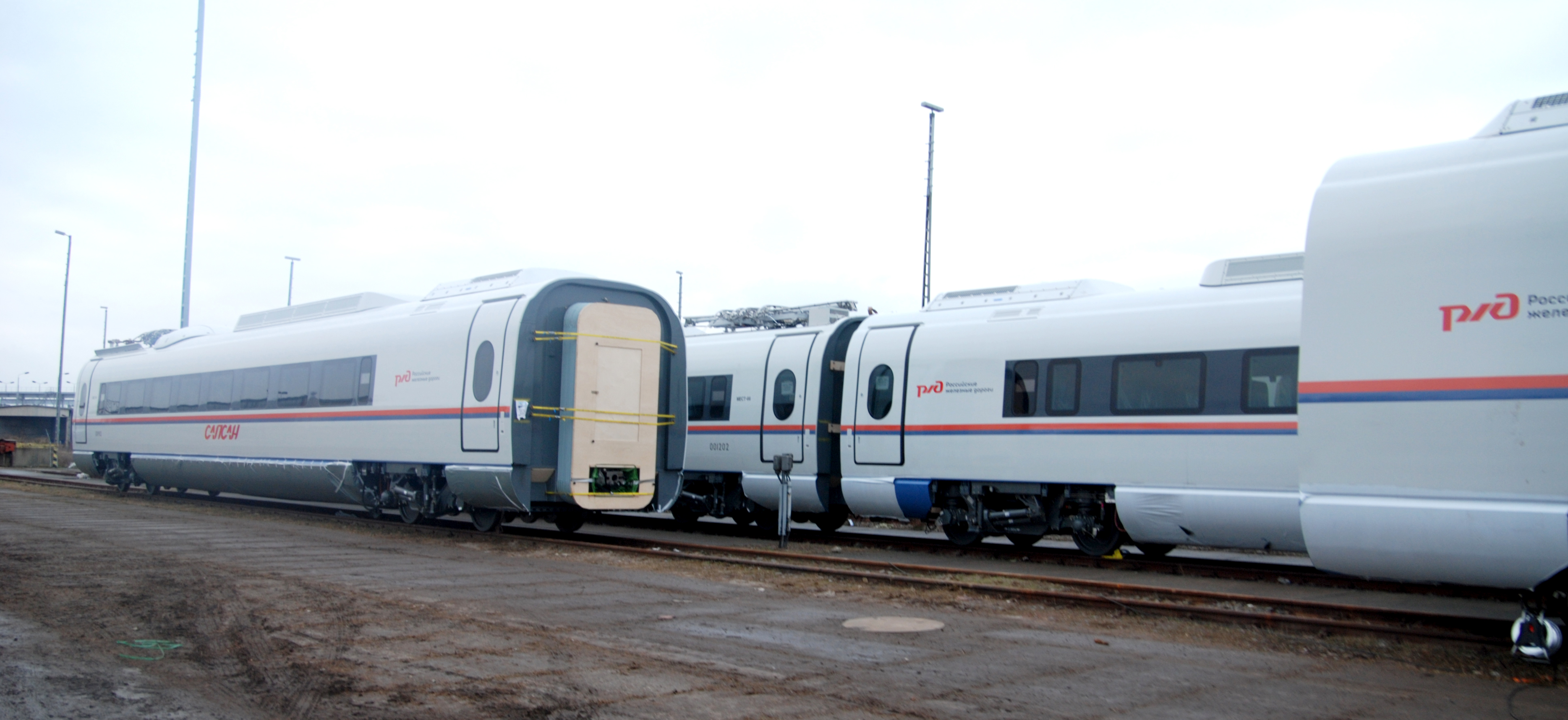
Intermediate carriages of the Sapsan electric train in a decoupled state

Top — single-system train of the EVS1 series with direct current of 3 kV (version B1)
Bottom — dual-system train of the EVS2 series with direct current of 3 kV and alternating current of 25 kV and 50 Hz (version B2)

- ГПм — head carriage, first class, motor, 23 seats (including four in the VIP section) + a three-seat sofa.
- ГТм — head carriage, passenger (third) class, motor, 51 seats (including 7 in the children's section) + baby cradle.
- ДБ — throttle, business (second) class, trailer, 52 seats.
- ДТ — throttle, passenger class, trailer, 99 seats.
- Т — passenger class, trailer, 66 seats.
- ТТр — passenger class, with transformer for alternating current, trailer, 66 seats.
- Тм — passenger class, motor, 66 seats,
- Та — passenger class, battery-powered, brake resistors on the roof, trailer, 60 seats.
- ТаБ — passenger class, battery-powered, brake resistors on the roof, with a bistro (restaurant), trailer, 40 seats + tables at the bar.

From 1 July 2018, a new class of service will appear in Sapsan carriage № 4 (14) — basic with a reduced cost and without additional services. According to the project, the carriage will have 66 seats.

== Route ==
=== Moscow – Saint Petersburg route ===
The first and the only (since 2015) route for Sapsan trains.

Moscow (Leningradsky railway terminal) – Tver (756A, 762A, 770A, 778A, 780A) – Vyshny Volochyok (758A, 768A, 776A) – Bologoye (756A, 762A, 770A, 778A, 780A, 784A) – Uglovka (758A, 760A, 768A, 778A) – Okulovka (758A, 760A, 768A, 778A) – Chudovo (756A, 758A, 768A, 776A, 780A, 784A, 786A) – Saint Petersburg (Moskovsky railway terminal)

There are no Sapsan trains stopping at all stations on the route. The fastest ones do not stop between Moscow and Saint Petersburg at all. Numbers of the trains which stop at intermediate stations are listed above. Such measures were implemented to increase speed.

Termini	via	Termini	Length	Average journey time	Train numbers	Date of introduction	Train type
Saint Petersburg—Moskovsky	Chudovo—Moskovskoye, Okulovka, Uglovka, Bologoye—Moskovskoye, Vyshny Volochyok, Tver, Kryukovo	Moscow—Leningradsky	650 kilometres (400 mi)	4 hours 00 minutes	751—757; 759—770; 772—780	17 December 2009	EVS1, EVS2

=== Moscow – Nizhny Novgorod route ===
Former route of Sapsan trains. Since 2015, new Talgo Strizh trains were introduced. All of the Sapsans were subsequently used on the Moscow – St Petersburg route.

Route	Length	Train type	Cancellation reason	Service period	Replaced by…
Moscow—Kursky - Nizhny Novgorod—Moskovsky	440 kilometres (270 mi)	EVS2	Increase in the number of flights on the Moscow-St. Petersburg route	30.07.2010 — 01.06.2015; 01.03.2018 — 01.06.2022	Strizh (2015); Lastochka (2022)

=== Saint Petersburg – Nizhny Novgorod route ===
On 1 March 2018, Russian Railways reopened the discontinued Saint Petersburg – Moscow – Nizhny Novgorod route which allows passengers to take an 8 hour 11 minute journey without a train change in Moscow.

Route	Length	Train type	Reason for cancellation	Service period	Replaced by…
Saint Petersburg—Moskovsky - Nizhny Novgorod—Moskovsky	1,090 kilometres (680 mi)	EVS2	Due to technical limitations, speeds greater than 160 km/h on the Moscow-Nizhny Novgorod section were not possible	30.07.2010 — 01.06.2015	—

== Tickets ==
On 1 July 2012, the Russian Railways company introduced a new tariff system for Sapsan trains which dynamically prices tickets based on two factors:

- The date of sale of the ticket,
- Percentage of occupied seats on the train.

The new rates range from 0.8 to 1.2 times the base rate for the day. It is possible to see the final price of a ticket for a specific date during the booking process.

== Image ==
RZD Sapsan route

== See also ==
- History of rail transport in Russia
- Siemens Velaro
