= ER200 =

Soviet electric train

ER200 (ЭР200)
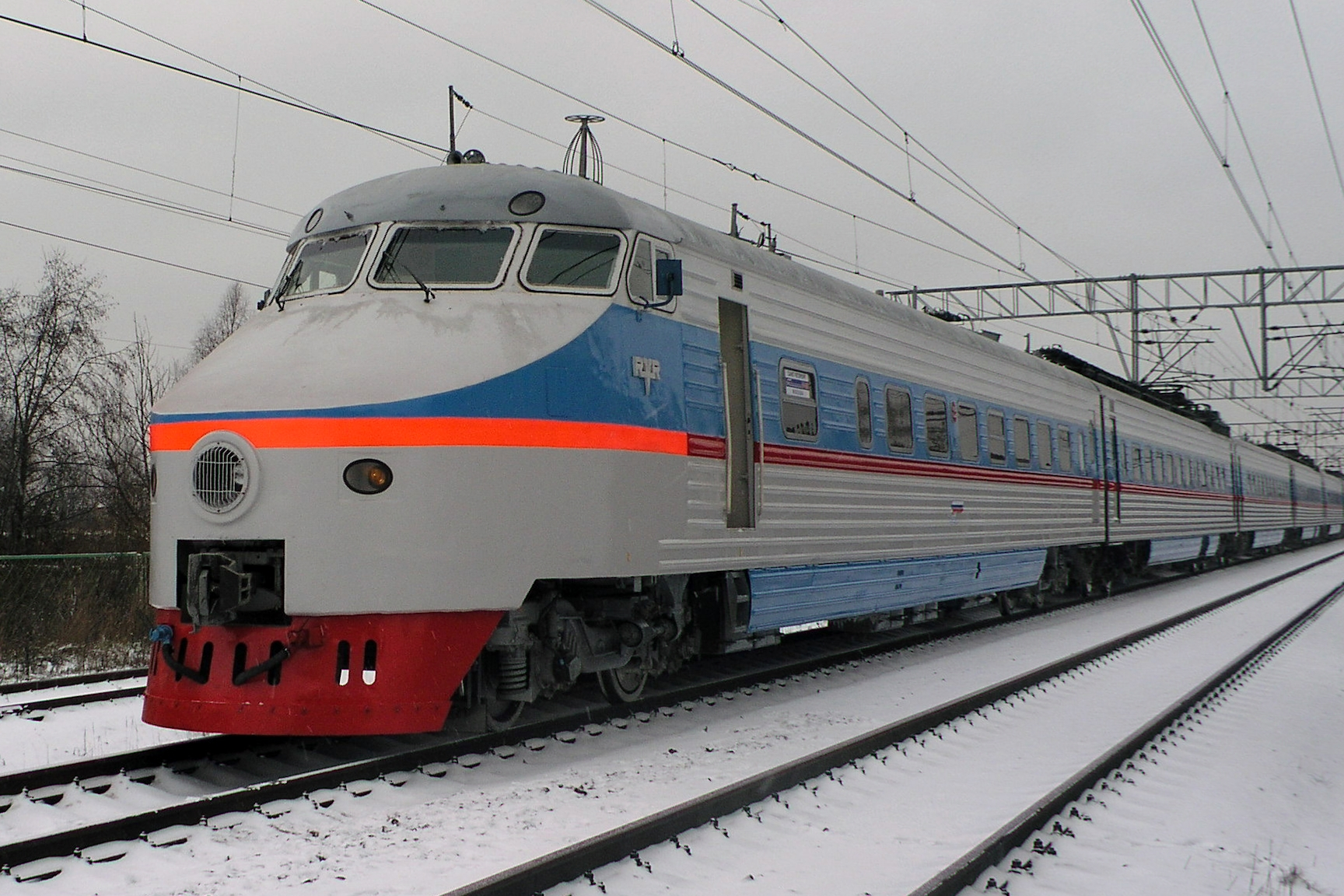
- EMU ER200 on the Moscow – Saint Petersburg Line
- In service: 1 March 1984 – 28 February 2009
- Manufacturers: Rīgas Vagonbūves Rūpnīca; Rīgas Elektromašinbūves Rūpnīca
- Constructed: 1973, 1988, 1991–1994
- Refurbished: 1988, 1998, 2003, 2005, 2009
- Number built: 28 cars (of them - 6 head/control cars); 2(3) sets
- Number in service: None
- Formation: DT + n x (Mp + M) + DT; 4, 6, 8, 10, 12, 14 cars
- Capacity: 24 seats (head cars) 64 seats (intermediate cars); 36 seats (renewed first class cars); 816 seats (14-car set) 304 seats (6-car set)
- Operators: Ministry of Railways; Russian Railways
- Depot: ТЧ-10 ОКТ ж.д. (Saint Petersburg)
- Line served: Moscow – Saint Petersburg Railway

Specifications
- Car body construction: Aluminium alloy
- Car length: 26,000 mm (85 ft 4 in)
- Width: 3,130 mm (10 ft 3 in)
- Height: 4,200 mm (13 ft 9 in)
- Doors: 2 per side
- Maximum speed: 200 km/h (124 mph)
- Weight: 48.7 t (47.9 long tons; 53.7 short tons) DT; 56.5 t (55.6 long tons; 62.3 short tons) M 58.5 t (57.6 long tons; 64.5 short tons) Mp; 787.4 t (775.0 long tons; 868.0 short tons) (14-car set); 327.4 t (322.2 long tons; 360.9 short tons) (6-car set)
- Traction system: 4 x 1ДТ.001 240 kW (320 hp) 750 V DC motors 8.9 kN (2,000 lb_{f}) x 4 = 35.6 kN (8,000 lb_{f}); 427.2 kN (96,000 lb_{f}) (14-car set) 142.4 kN (32,000 lb_{f}) (6-car set)
- Power output: 240 kW (320 hp) x 4 (one hour) 215 kW (288 hp) x 4 (continuous); 11,520 kW (15,450 hp) (14-car set) 3,840 kW (5,150 hp) (6-car set)
- Transmission: 1 : 2.346 gear ratio
- Acceleration: 0.4 m/s^{2} (1.3 ft/s^{2}) (1.44 km/(h⋅s) or 0.89 mph/s)
- Deceleration: 0.4 m/s^{2} (1.3 ft/s^{2}) (1.44 km/(h⋅s) or 0.89 mph/s) (normal service); 0.6 m/s^{2} (2.0 ft/s^{2}) (2.16 km/(h⋅s) or 1.34 mph/s) (max service); 1.2 m/s^{2} (3.9 ft/s^{2}) (4.32 m/s^{2} or 14.2 ft/s^{2}) (emergency)
- Electric system: 3 kV DC Overhead catenary
- Current collection: Pantograph
- Braking systems: Rheostatic brake, Electro-pneumatic disc brake, Electromagnetic track brake
- Safety system: KLUB-U
- Coupling system: SA3
- Track gauge: 1,520 mm (4 ft 11 27/32 in) Russian gauge

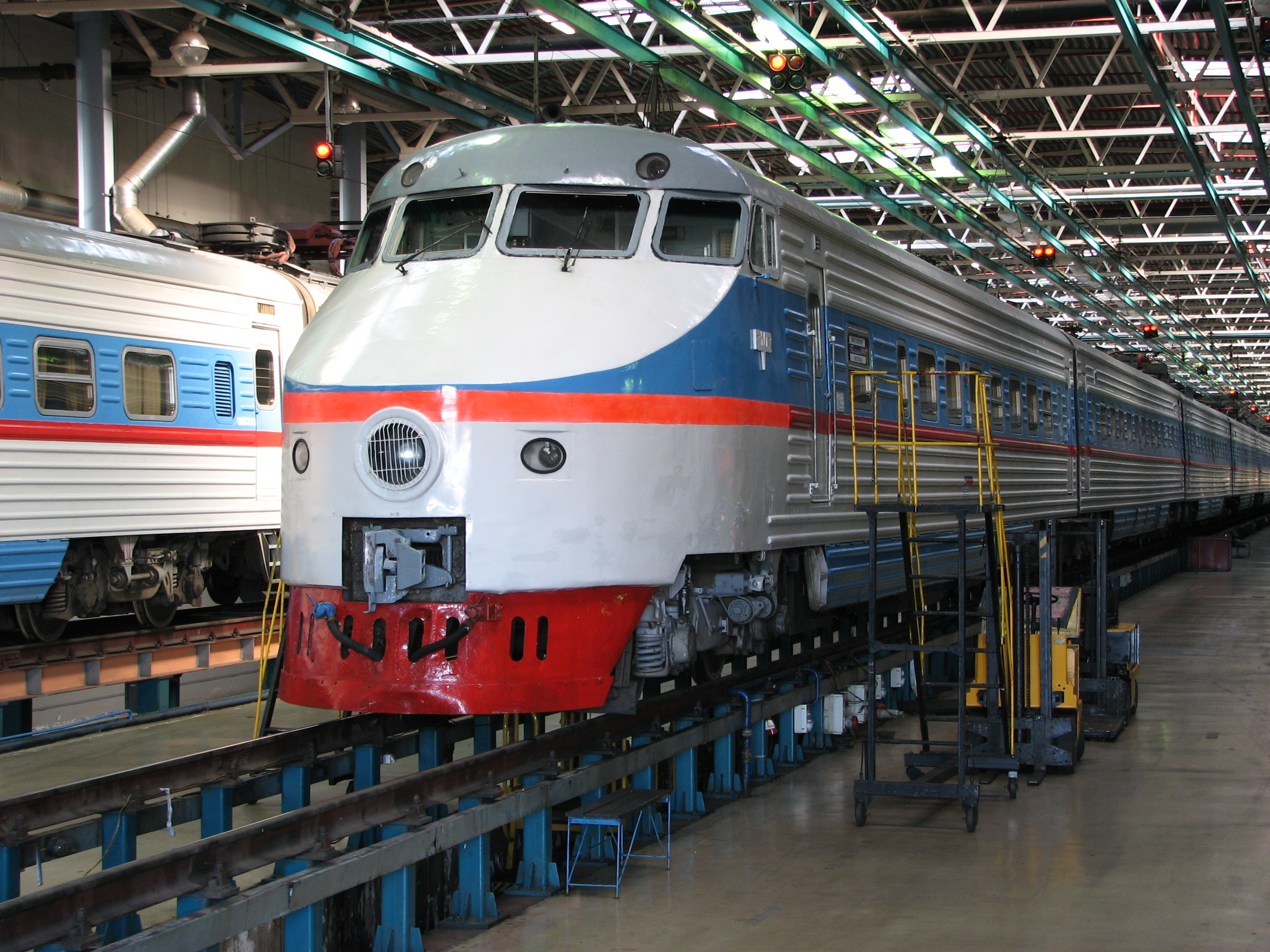
ER200 in maintenance facilities

The ER200 was a Soviet electric train built in Riga by Rīgas Vagonbūves Rūpnīca. It was the first high-speed Direct Current intercity Electric Multiple Unit (EMU) train with rheostatic brake.

There were two designs. The first design, begun in 1974, was the ER200-1 EMU, and went into commercial operation in 1984. The second design went into operation between Saint Petersburg and Moscow in 1996.

The ER200 Trainsets were built between 1973 and 1994 in the Soviet Union and Russia.

== Overall trainset description ==
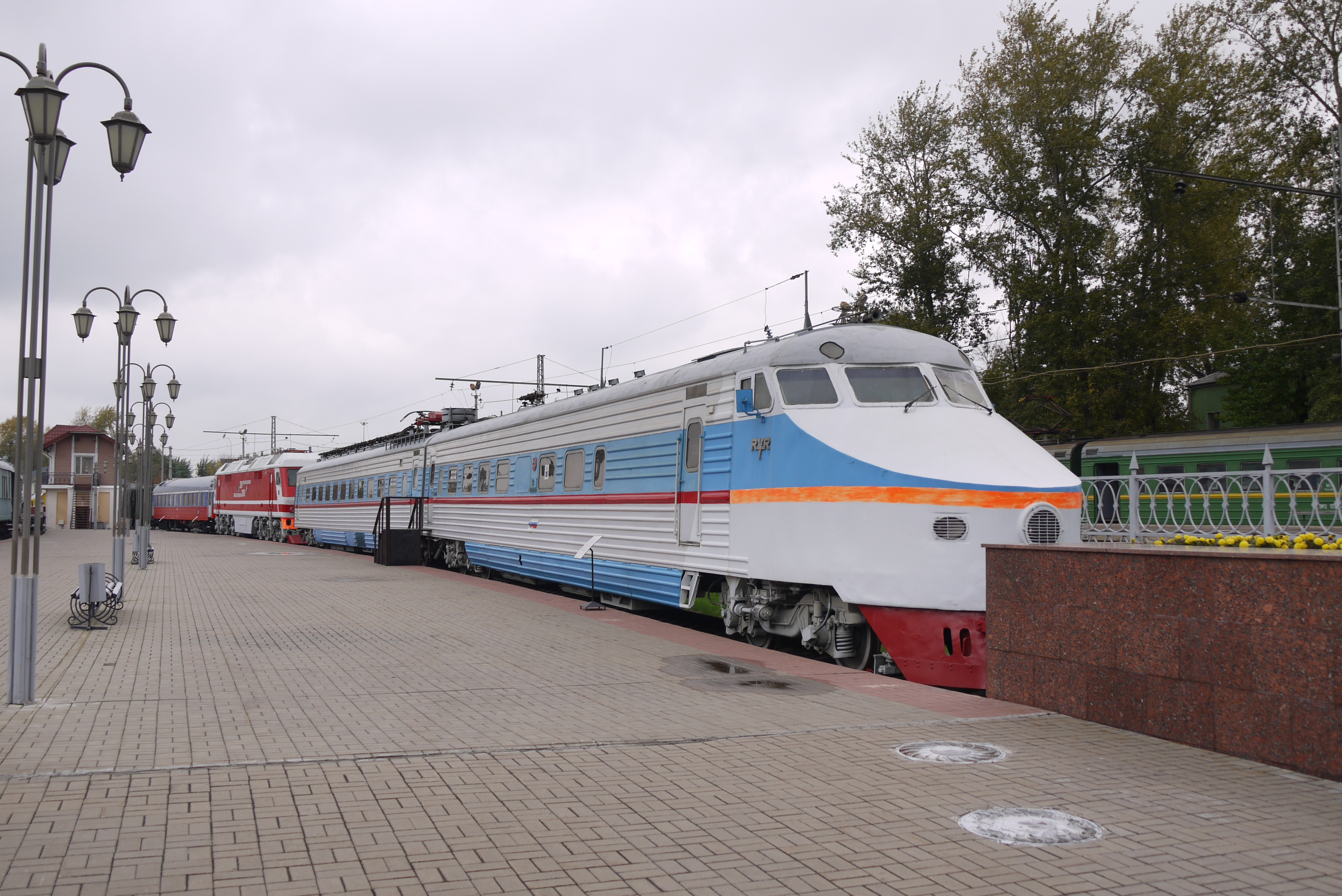
ER200-105 at the Moscow Railway Museum, Rizhsky Rail Terminal

Supplier	RVR
First supplied	1974
Type	IC/IR
Maximum speed	200 km/h
Line voltage	3,000 V DC
Main configuration	DT+4(Mp+M)+DT / DT+3(Mp+M)+DT
Single unit configuration (options)	Mp+M (M+Mp+DT)
Number of seats	544 / 416
Train weight	557.4 t / 442.4 t
Coach weight (DT / M / Mp)	48.7 t / 56.5 t / 58.5 t
Gauge	1,520 mm

== Body ==
Body data	
Supplier	RVR / KVZ
Length	26,000 mm
Width	3,130 mm
Height	4,200 mm
Distance between suspensions	18,800 mm
Number of entry doors in coach	4
Number of seats (DT / M)	16 / 64

== Bogies ==
Bogies data	
Supplier	RVR
Distance between axles (M / T)	2,500 mm / 2,500 mm
Weight (M / T)	12.5 t / 8.06 t
Wheel diameter (M / T)	950 mm / 950 mm
Number of motor bogies under the M-car	2
Number of TM in M-bogie	2
Gear ratio	2.346
Traction motor	(TM)
Supplier	RER
Type	DC commutator
Model	1DT-001
One-hour power	240 kW
Continue power	215 kW
Voltage	750 V
Continue current	285 A
Max field weakening	20.0%
Wheel force	8.9 kN
Weight	1,320 kg

== Main circuit electric equipment ==
- Supplier: RER
- Control mode: rheostatic step control + TCH
- Traction converter: thyristor DC chopper (TCH)
- Mounting place: under floor Mp
- Semiconductors: thyristors TB353-630-16
- Number of semiconductors: 20
- Nominal output voltage: 3,000 V
- Modulation frequency: 400 Hz
- Cooling system: self-ventilated
- Number of TM in unit: 8
- Number of TM sequences: 2
- Electric brake: rheostatic

== Auxiliary electric equipment ==
- Supplier: RER
- Converter type: rotating machine
- Model: 1PV.004
- Input voltage: 3,000 V
- Output voltage: 3x220 V
- Power: 75.0 kW
- Battery voltage: 110 V

== Operational performance ==
- Design/commercial speed: 200 km/h (124 mph)
- Acceleration (0–60 km/h): 0.4 m/s^{2} (1.44 km/h/s)
- Service deceleration (80–0 km/h): 0.4 m/s^{2} (1.44 km/h/s)
- Max service deceleration: 0.6 m/s^{2} (2.16 km/h/s)
- Emergency deceleration: 1.2 m/s^{2} (4.32 km/h/s)

== See also ==
- Rīgas Vagonbūves Rūpnīca
- The Museum of the Moscow Railway, at Paveletsky Rail Terminal, Moscow
- Rizhsky Rail Terminal, Home of the Moscow Railway Museum
- Varshavsky Rail Terminal, St.Petersburg, Home of the Central Museum of Railway Transport, Russian Federation
- History of rail transport in Russia
- The EMU pages. ER200.
