= Kutuzovo-Novoye railway station =

Railway station

Kutuzovo-Novoye Кутузово-Новое
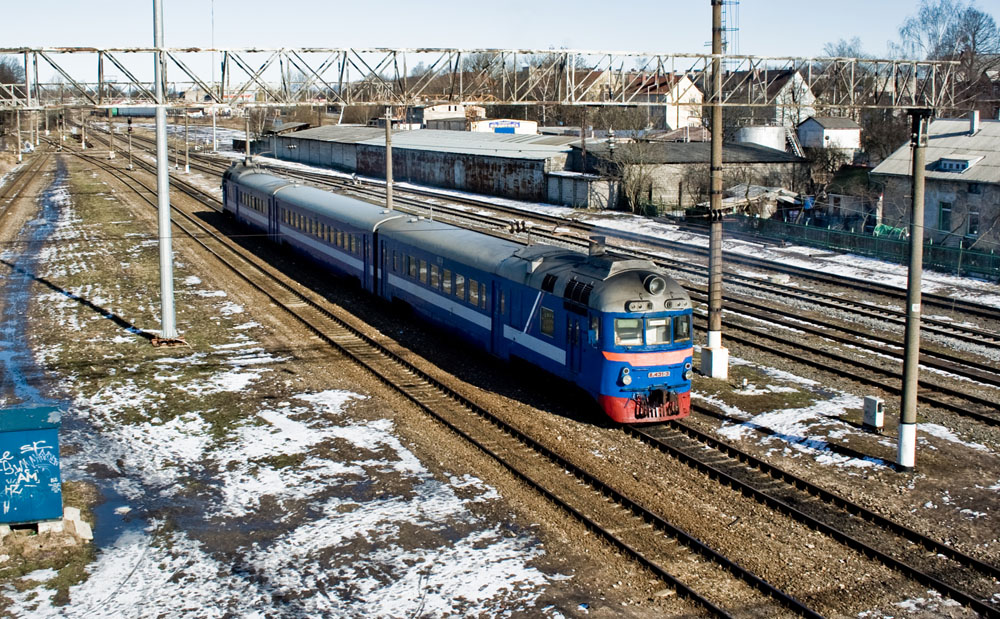

General information
- Location: Kaliningrad, Kaliningrad Oblast, Russia
- Coordinates: 54°44′43″N 20°31′54″E
- Platforms: 2
- Tracks: 7

Construction
- Parking: yes

Other information
- Station code: 10430

History
- Former names: Rothenstein

Services
Preceding station	Russian Railways	Following station
Kaliningrad North towards Kaliningrad South	Kaliningrad–Zelenogradsk	Dorozhny towards Zelenogradsk
Kaliningrad North towards Kaliningrad South	Kaliningrad–Svetlogorsk	Dorozhny towards Svetlogorsk-II
Kaliningrad North towards Kaliningrad South	Kaliningrad–Guryevsk city train	Guryevsk-central towards Guryevsk-novy
Location

Kutuzovo-Novoye railway station (Russian: станция Кутузово-Новое) is a railway station located in Kaliningrad, Kaliningrad Oblast, Russia. It is part of the Kaliningrad Railway, on the line between Kaliningrad North railway station and northern destinations including Baltiysk, Sovetsk, Guryevsk, Svetlogorsk, Pionersky, Zelenogradsk and Polessk. It was formerly known as Rothenstein, during the period when Kaliningrad was part of Germany as Königsberg, and served the Rothenstein quarter of the city.

== Description ==
Kutuzovo-Novoye is three kilometres from Kaliningrad North railway station; and nine from Guryevsk-Tsentralny railway station, on the line to Sovetsk, and six from platform 7 km on the line to Zelenogradsk. It handles both cargo and passengers, with Elektrichka suburban commuter trains stopping on their journeys between Kaliningrad South railway station and the stations of Guryevsk-Novoye, Zelenogradsk-Novoye, Pionersky Kurort, and Sovetsk. Svetlogorsk and Slavyansky can also be reached by direct train.

Kutuzovo-Novoye has a passenger footbridge, two platforms and seven railway tracks.
