= Kaliningrad North railway station =

Railway station in Kaliningrad, Russia

Kaliningrad–North Калининград–Северный
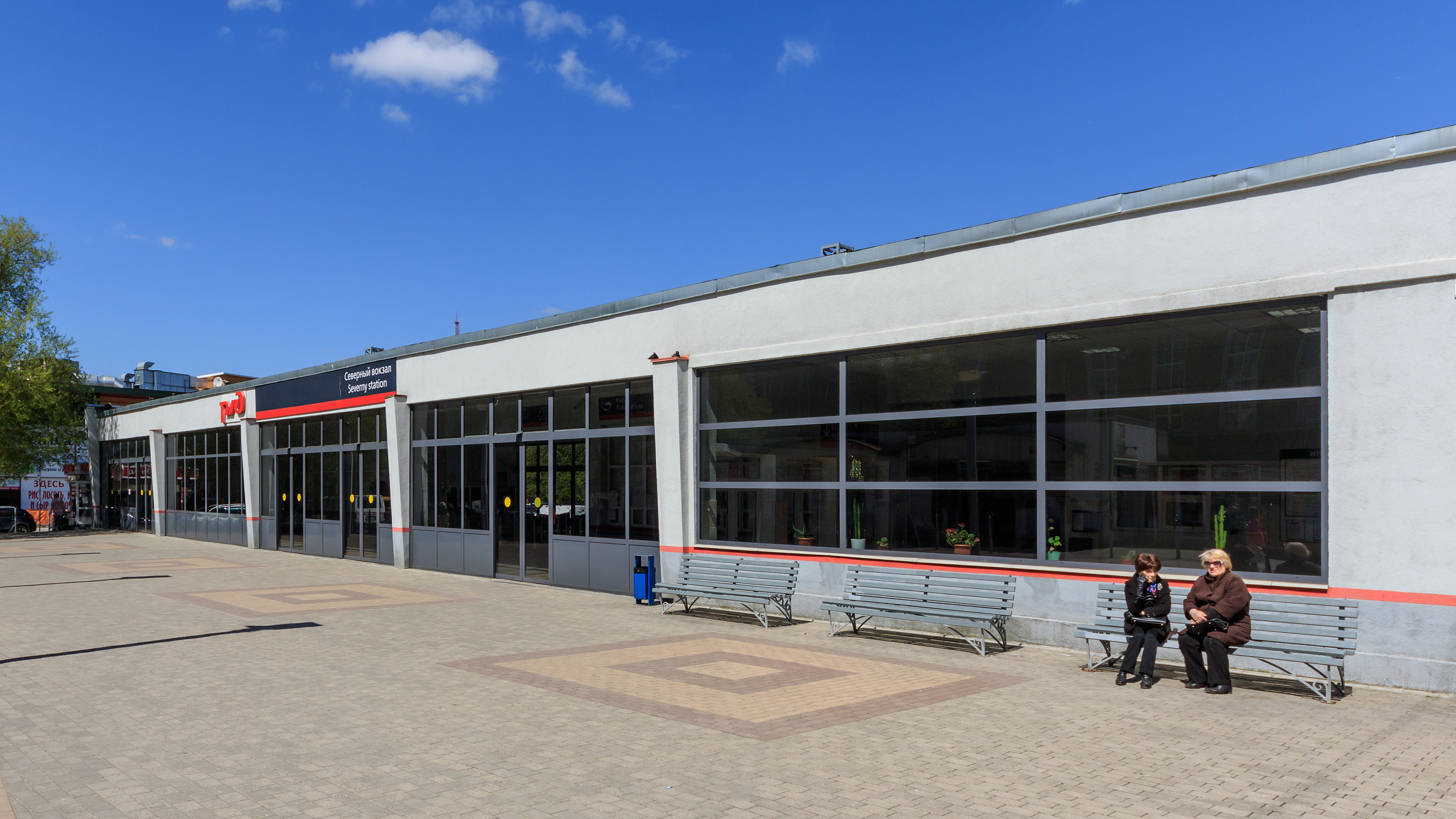

General information
- Location: Pobedy Square, Kaliningrad; Kaliningrad Oblast; Russia
- Coordinates: 54.7213°N 20.50007°E
- System: Elektrichka suburban rail major station
- Owner: Russian Railways
- Operator: Kaliningrad Railway
- Platforms: 7 (3 terminus island platforms & 1 through side platforms)
- Tracks: 6 (two of the tracks have been removed & one is a freight track with no platform)
- Connections: Trams in Kaliningrad

Construction
- Parking: Yes
- Cycle facilities: Yes
- Accessible: Vertical transport around the station is using ramps

History
- Opened: 1920
- Rebuilt: 1964
- Former names: Königsberg-Nordbahnhof

Services
Preceding station	Russian Railways	Following station
Kaliningrad South Terminus	Kaliningrad–Zelenogradsk	Kutuzovo-Novoye towards Zelenogradsk
Kaliningrad South Terminus	Kaliningrad–Svetlogorsk	Kutuzovo-Novoye towards Svetlogorsk-II
Kaliningrad South Terminus	Kaliningrad–Guryevsk city train	Kutuzovo-Novoye towards Guryevsk-novy
Track layout
Location

Kaliningrad–Severny (Russian: Калининград–Северный; German: Königsberg Nordbahnhof) is a suburban rail station on Pobedy Square (Victory Square) in Kaliningrad.

== History ==
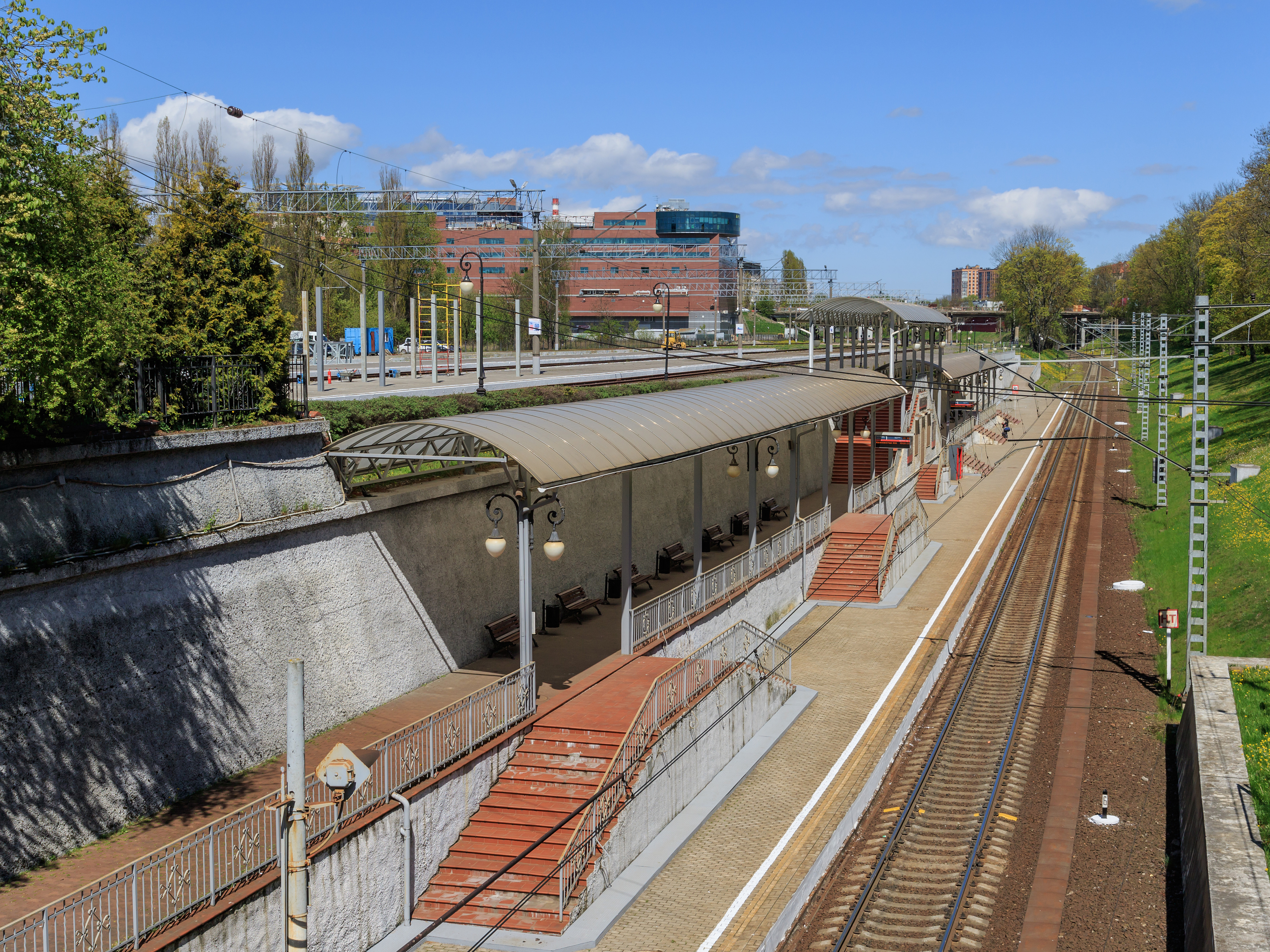
View inside of the station

The station was built in 1920 on the site of Steindammer Tor as part of a railway linking the networks north & south of the city. It replaced the previous Crantzer Bahnhof & Samlandbahnhof. A 5-storey entrance building facing south onto Hansaplatz was designed by architect Martin Stallmann in the modernist style.

During World War II, on 24 June 1942, the first and largest group of Jewish deportees from East Prussia, comprising 465 Jewish men, women and children, were loaded onto trains by members of the SS at the freight depot of the city's northern station and sent to the Maly Trostenets extermination camp near Minsk.

After the war, the station was closed and the main building, which had been damaged badly by incendiary bombs, was rebuilt as offices. In 1964, the station was reopened to serve trains running to the seaside. A new ticket office was built. In 1976 the station saw its first electric trains, beginning the Elektrichka network of suburban trains.

On 24 June 2011, a memorial plaque was dedicated at the station to Jewish deportees from Königsberg and the province of East Prussia.

== Layout ==
5: Attic with storage for offices
4-2: Offices
1: Shops. The central section once contained the ticket hall, but now has a bank & the entrance to the offices.
0: The new ticket office & terminus platforms. 2 of the platforms have had their tracks dismantled, & the space is occupied by a TЭ-class steam locomotive.
-1: External waiting area for the through platform.
-2: Through platform
