= Yantar (train) =

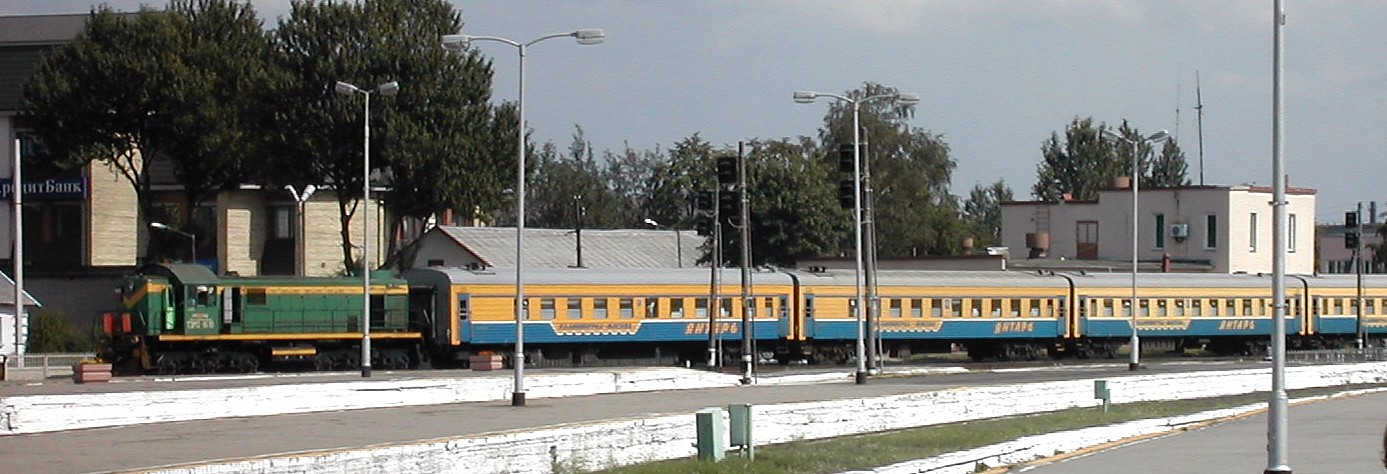
- Train composition in Kaliningrad (2003)

Overview
- Current operator: JSC Federal Passenger Company

Route
- Termini: Belorussky Station,Moscow; South Station,Kaliningrad
- Stops: 13 / 12
- Distance travelled: 1285 km
- Average journey time: 20 hours 4 minutes / 19 hours 2 minutes
- Service frequency: Daily

Yantar is a fast branded train No. 029Ч(Moscow to Kaliningrad)/030Ч(Kaliningrad to Moscow) of Russian Railways of the North-West branch of JSC "Federal Passenger Company", running on the route Kaliningrad - Moscow - Kaliningrad .

The travel time to Kaliningrad is just over 20 hours, and back to Moscow - just over 19.

The train departs from Belorussky Station, Moscow and arrives at South Station in Kaliningrad .

== History ==
The line began running in 1964. The train travels through the territories of Russia, Belarus and Lithuania, passing such cities as Vyazma, Smolensk, Minsk, and Vilnius.

== Rolling stock ==
The train is assembled in Kaliningrad using compartment cars manufactured by the German company Ammendorf (only the staff car), as well as compartment and reserved seat cars from TVZ . The train consists of 36-seat compartment cars, 54-seat reserved seat cars, a staff car, and a dining car. Russian Post mail and baggage cars are also attached to the train.

The maximum number of carriages in a train is as follows:

- 1 SV
- 7 compartment cars (including 1 car with a seat for people with disabilities)
- 7 compartment carriages
- 1 dining car

== Incidents ==
On September 21, 2009, at approximately 5:00 a.m., while traveling through Lithuanian territory , near Vilnius , a TEP60 diesel locomotive belonging to Lithuanian Railways , pulling the Yantar train en route from Moscow to Kaliningrad , caught fire . There were no injuries, and the train was delayed for 3 hours.

On November 3, 2013, at 10:45 PM, at the Olekhnovichi railway crossing in the Molodechno district of the Minsk region, the Yantar train collided with a Mercedes automobile that had entered the crossing against a red light. As a result, the automobile became trapped between the train cars and a locomotive traveling on the odd-numbered track in the opposite direction of a freight train. Three people in the automobile were killed. The train passengers and the locomotive crew were uninjured. The diesel locomotives sustained minor damage and were able to continue on their own.

On May 20, 2017, at 2:30 a.m., on the Slavnoye-Tolochin section of the Belarusian Railway, a herd of cows grazing uncontrollably strayed onto the tracks due to the fault of an intoxicated shepherd, and at least five of them were struck and killed by an EP20-036 electric locomotive carrying branded train No. 30 "Yantar" on the Kaliningrad-Moscow route. As a result, the locomotive sustained minor damage, and train No. 30 arrived in Moscow four hours late.

== Links ==
- Информация о фирменном поезде «Янтарь» на сайте «РЖД»
- Плацкарт со всеми удобствами. Фирменному поезду «Янтарь» исполнилось 60 лет. Татьяна Остапова. Аргументы и факты Калининград. 26 November 2021
- Пётр Старцев. В Калининграде раскрыли секреты уехавшего в Москву поезда «Янтарь». «Русский Запад» – новости Калининграда. 26 November 2021
- Виталий Невар. Обновление «Янтаря»: как изменился скорый поезд «Калининград-Москва». Новый Калининград.Ru. 2 December 2016
- РЖД возобновят ежедневные поезда из Москвы в Калининград. РИА-Новости 21 September 2020
