= Kaliningrad South railway station =

Railway station in Kaliningrad, Russia

Kaliningrad–South Калининград–Южный
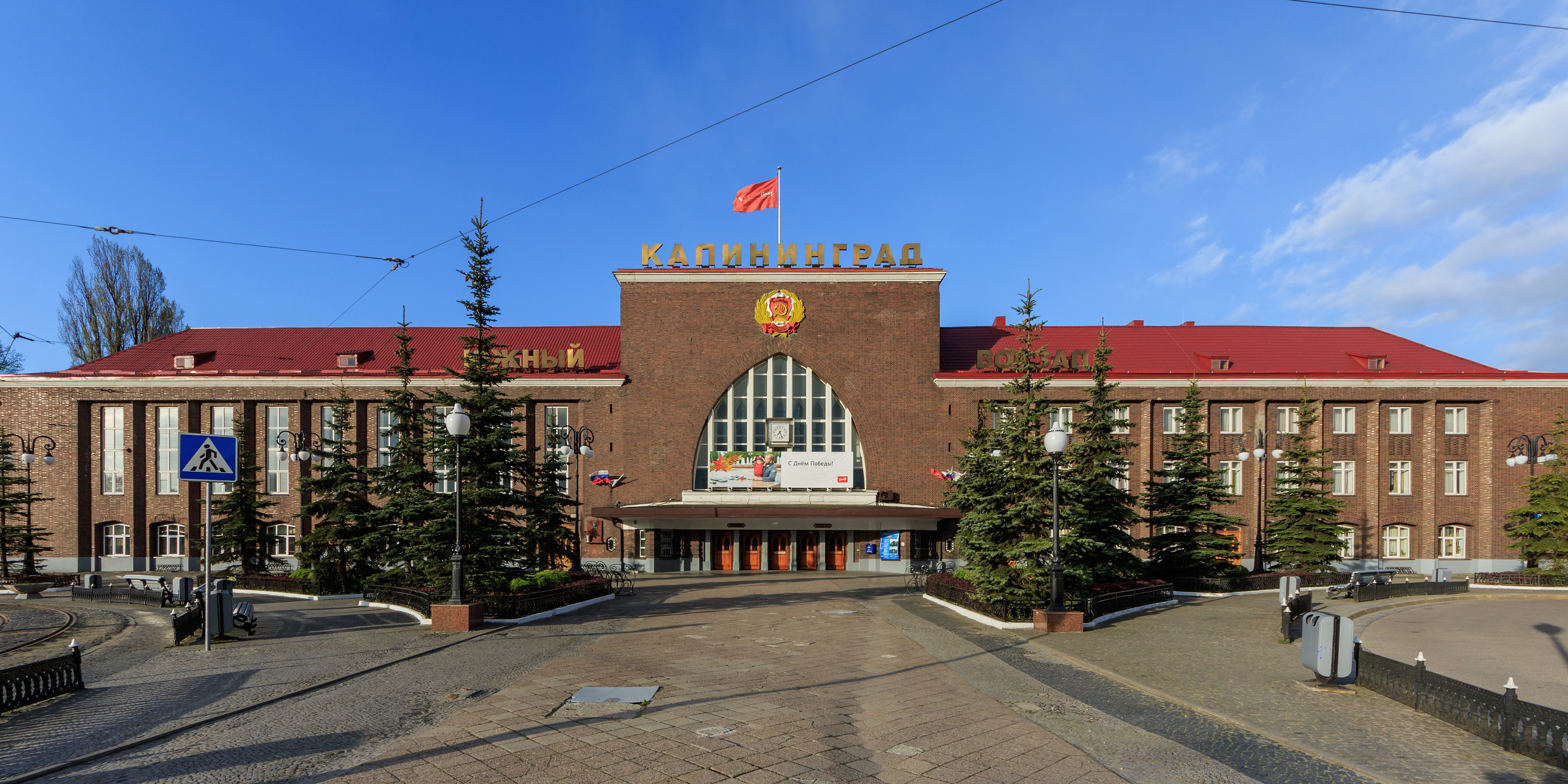
- View of the station from the street.

General information
- Other names: Kaliningrad South
- Location: Kaliningrad, Kaliningrad Oblast, Russia
- Coordinates: 54.6944°N 20.4983°E
- System: Kaliningrad Railway terminal
- Owner: Russian Railways
- Operator: Kaliningrad Railway
- Platforms: 6 (5 island platforms)
- Tracks: 11

Construction
- Parking: Yes

Other information
- Station code: 100016
- Fare zone: 6

History
- Opened: 1929 (Germany); 1949 (Russian re-opening)
- Former names: Königsberger Hauptbahnhof

Services
Preceding station	Russian Railways	Following station
Kievskaya towards Mamonovo	Kaliningrad–Mamonovo	Terminus
Zapadnyy-Novyy towards Baltiysk	Kaliningrad–Baltiysk	Terminus
Terminus	Kaliningrad–Bagrationovsk	Dzerzhinskaya-Novaya towards Bagrationovsk
Terminus	Kaliningrad–Zelenogradsk	Kaliningrad North towards Zelenogradsk
Terminus	Kaliningrad–Svetlogorsk	Kaliningrad North towards Svetlogorsk-II
Terminus	Kaliningrad–Guryevsk city train	Kaliningrad North towards Guryevsk-novy
Location

Kaliningrad–Passazhirsky (Russian: Калининград–Пассажирский), also called Kaliningrad South (Russian: Калининград–Южный), also referred to as Königsberger Hauptbahnhof during the German past of the city, prior to 1945, is the largest railway station on the Russian Kaliningrad Railway. It is located in the westernmost point of Russia — the city of Kaliningrad.

== Platforms ==
Platform 6 of the station is a standard gauge platform, where trains arrive from Poland, Germany and other countries of Europe.

== History ==
By the end of the 19th century Königsberg had become an important hub of the railway network, where lines in different directions — Central Germany, Poland, the Russian Empire and the Baltic countries - converged. However these different lines terminated at different stations. The idea of building a central station was proposed in 1896, and a plan was prepared in 1914. However, because of World War I, building did not begin until 1920, and the grand opening took place on 19 September 1929.

The station continued to work normally until 21 January 1945. During the battle for the city the station was significantly affected, so after the war, the station did not operate, and the role of the main passenger station served as temporary marshalling yard. The station was only reopened in 1949 by the Soviet Council of Ministers.

The first major reconstruction of the station took place in 2003 – the interiors (offices, waiting room, cafe) were refurbished. The lobby of the station was decorated with new chandeliers and a fountain, and the underground passages leading to the platforms were refurbished. Clocks were installed in the facade and lobby of the station. However, the overall architectural appearance of the station has remained unchanged.

== Trains ==
- Moscow — Kaliningrad (also called the Yantar)
- St.Petersburg — Kaliningrad
- Adler (on the eastern Black Sea, near Sochi) — Kaliningrad
- Chelyabinsk (in the Urals) — Kaliningrad (summer)
