= Roszheldorproject =

Russian company

- Native name: АО «Росжелдорпроект»
- Company type: Joint-stock company
- Founded: 2006
- Headquarters: Russia: Moscow
- Revenue: $441 million (2017)
- Operating income: $65.4 million (2017)
- Net income: $46.4 million (2017)
- Total assets: $32 million (2017)
- Total equity: $104 million (2017)
- Number of employees: More than 6100 (December 2015)
- Website: rzdp.com

JSC Roszheldorproject is a Russian company which carries out design and survey works for construction, overhaul and renovation projects in railway, industrial, social and cultural spheres, for construction and renovation of commercial property and residential constructions.

The company was formed in 2006 through the merger of design and research institutes, which were formerly a part of JSC Russian Railways (in December, 2014 the company changed the type of business entity from OJSC to JSC according to Russian legislation). The institutes of Roszheldorproject perform the full range of works for the integrated design of railway infrastructure and socially significant facilities. The company takes an active part in the implementation of global high speed rail project. Roszeldorproject was the general designer for a number of infrastructure transport projects that were key projects of the Winter Olympic Games in Sochi in 2014.

== Structure ==
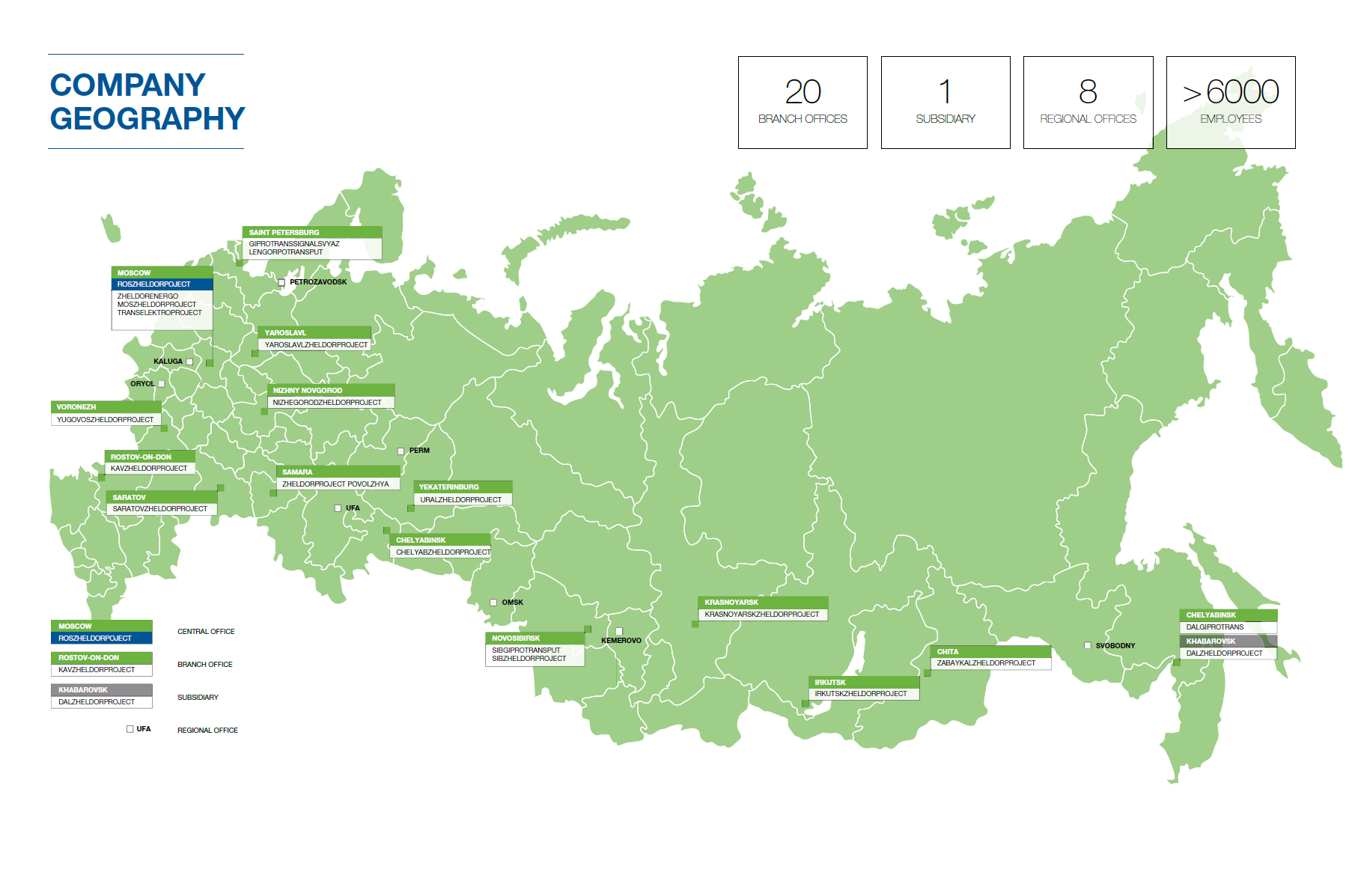
Company Geography

Today, the company consists of 20 branches:

- Giprotransput,
- Giprotranssignalsvyaz,
- Dalzheldorproject,
- Zheldorproject Povolzhya,
- Zabaykalzheldorproject,
- Irkutskzheldorproject,
- Kavzheldorproject,
- Krasnoyarskzheldorproject,
- Lengiprotransput,
- Moszheldorproject,
- Nizhegorodzheldorproject,
- Saratovzheldorproject,
- Sibgiprotransput,
- Sibzheldorproject,
- Transelectroproject,
- Uralzheldorproject,
- Chelyabzheldorproject,
- Yugovoszheldorproject,
- Yaroslavzheldorproject,
- Zheldorenergo

Dalgiprotrans (a subsidiary company) and regional divisions.

== Projects ==
=== Current projects ===
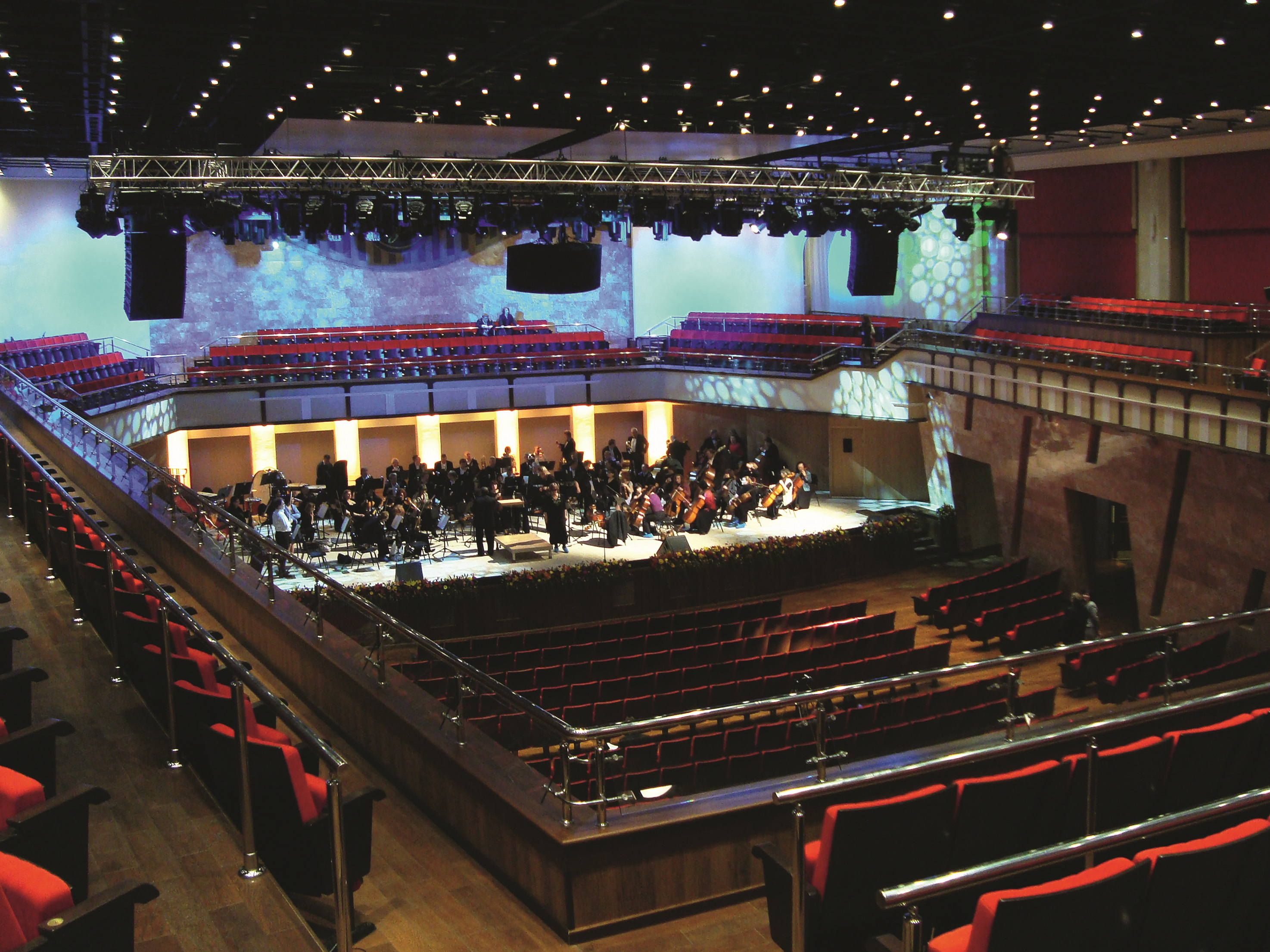
Renovation of concert hall in Omsk

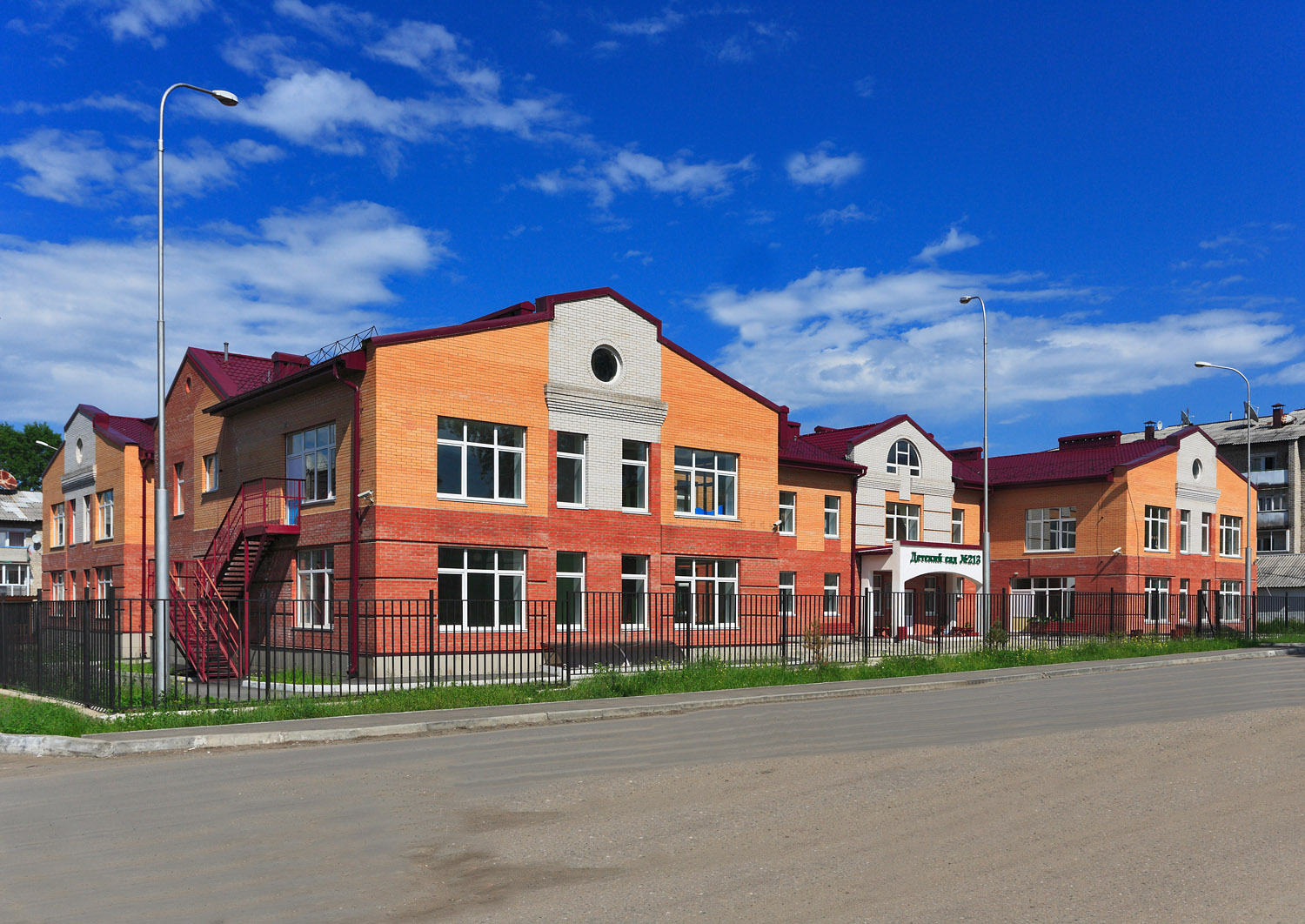
Construction of day-care center No. 213 in Slyudyanka

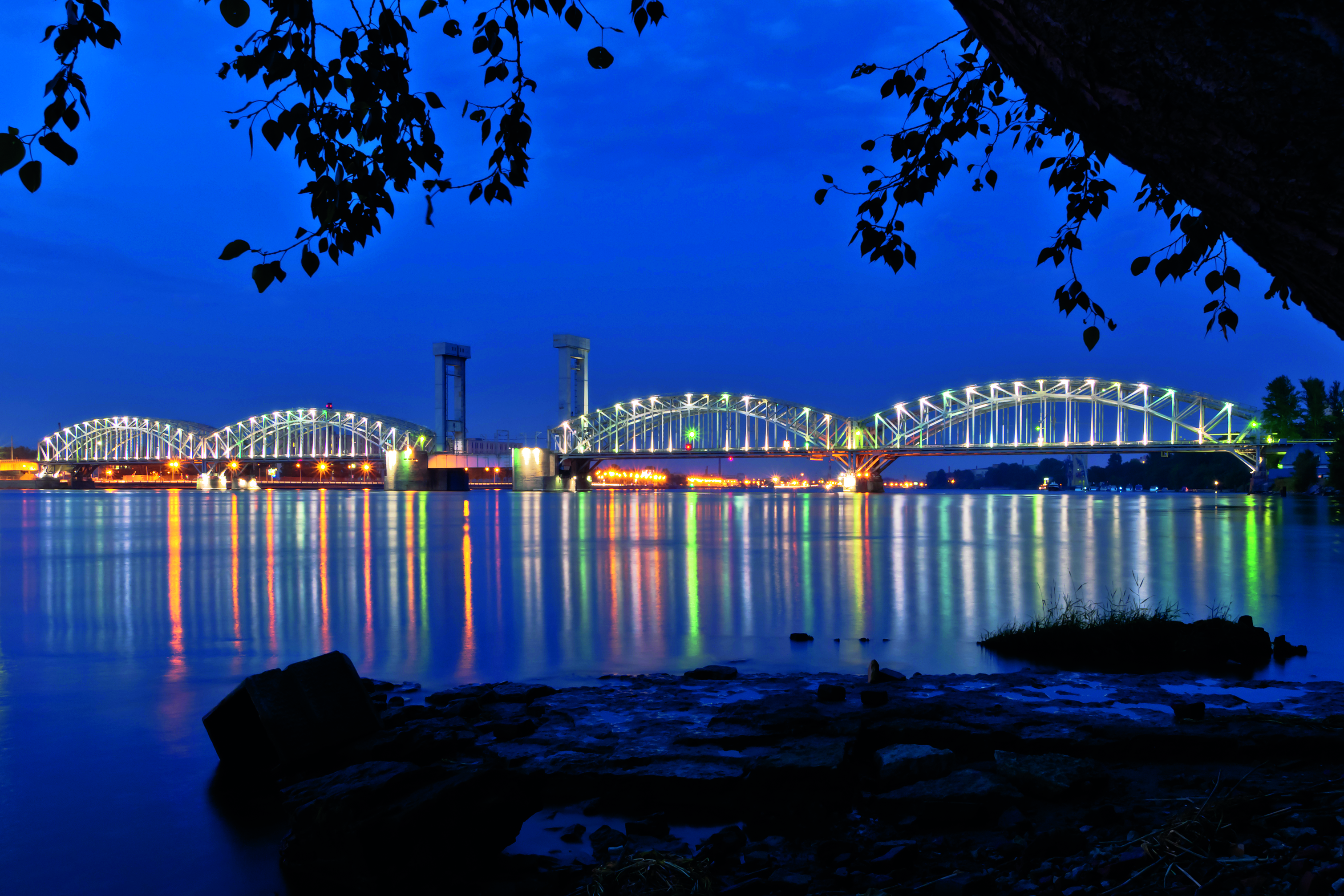
Reconstruction of the Finlyandsky Railway Bridge in Saint-Petersburg

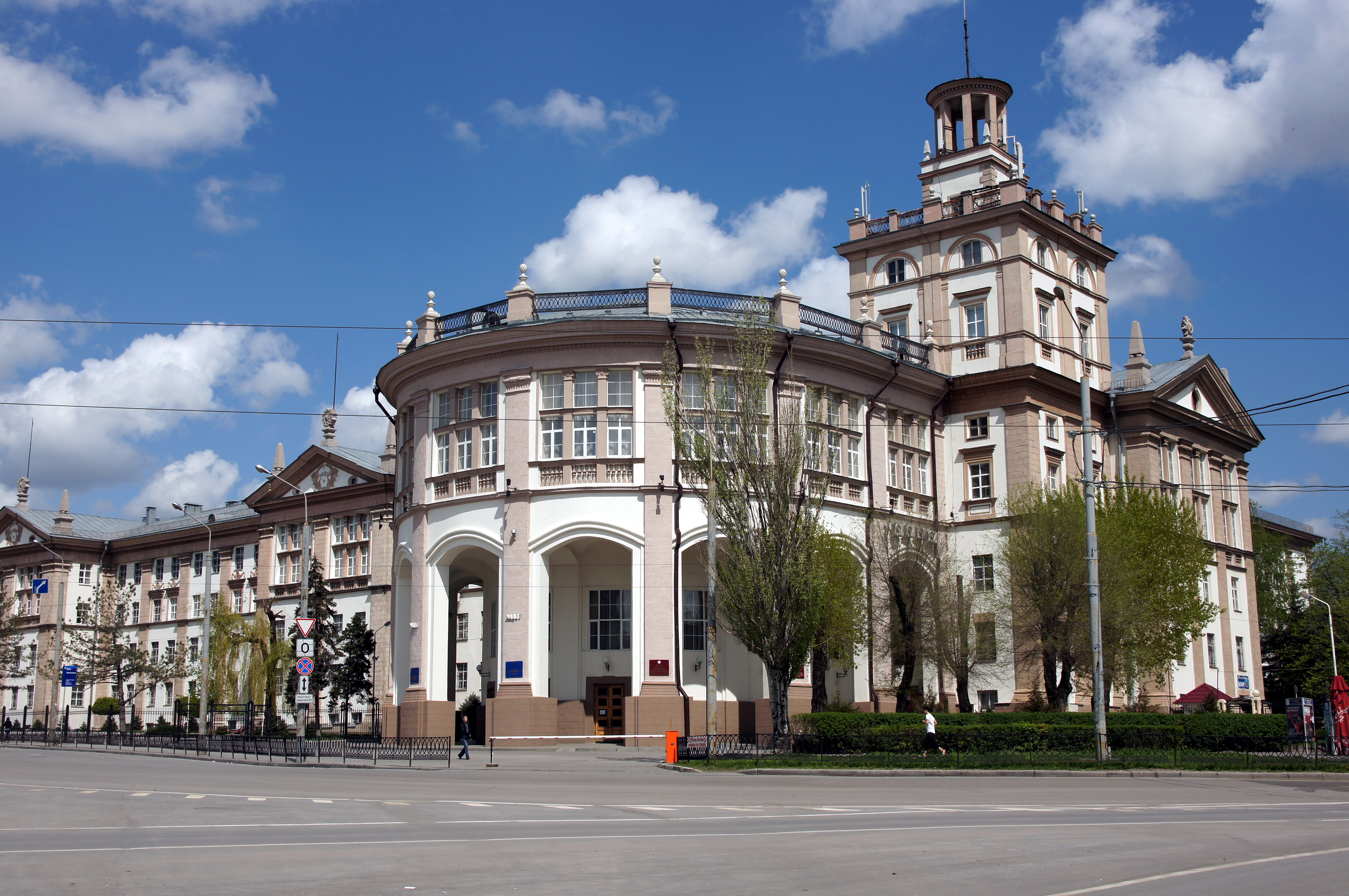
Reconstruction of the building complex of Rostov State University of Communication Lines, Rostov-on-Don

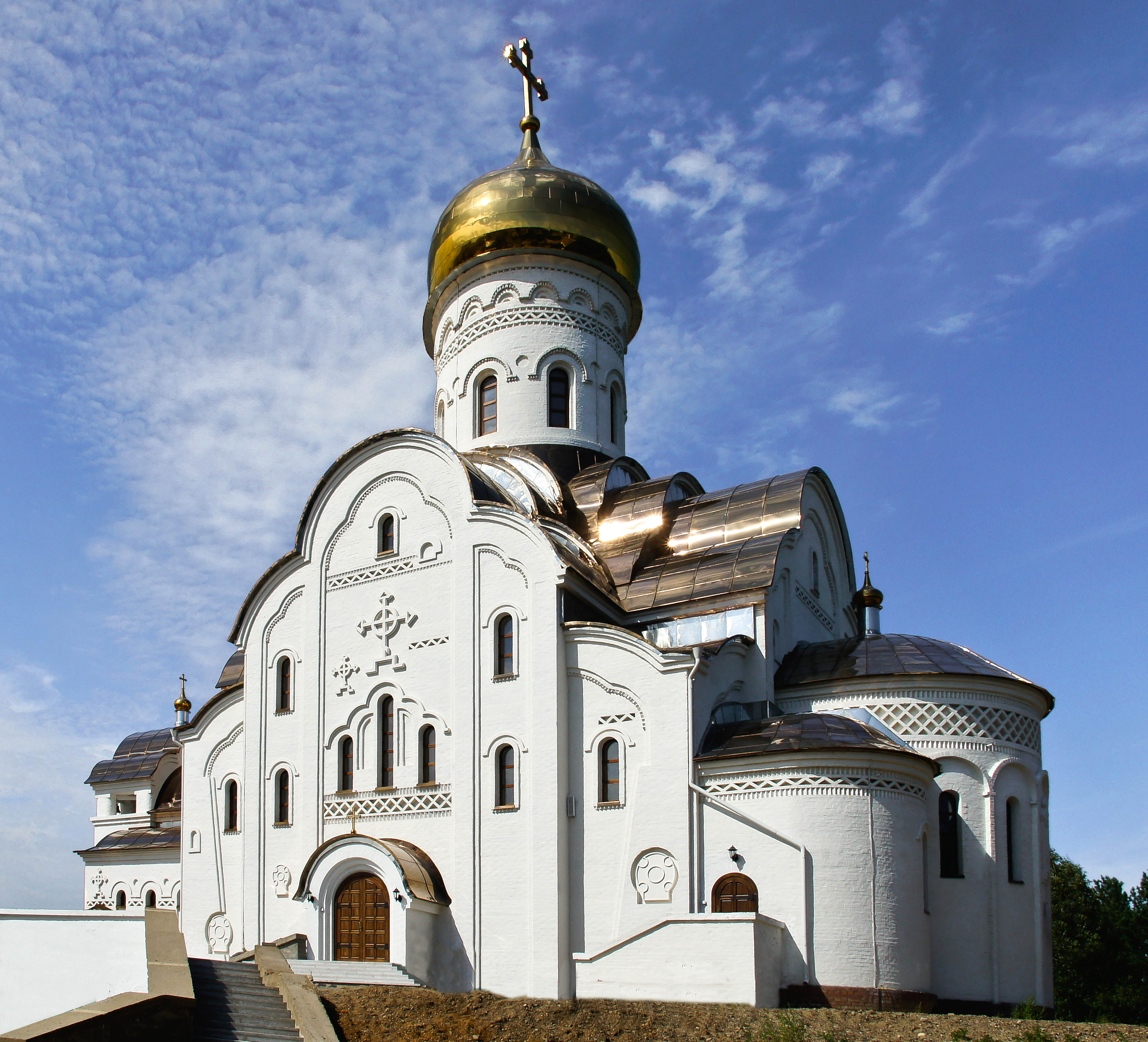
Orthodox Church of St. Andrew the First in Lesosibirsk

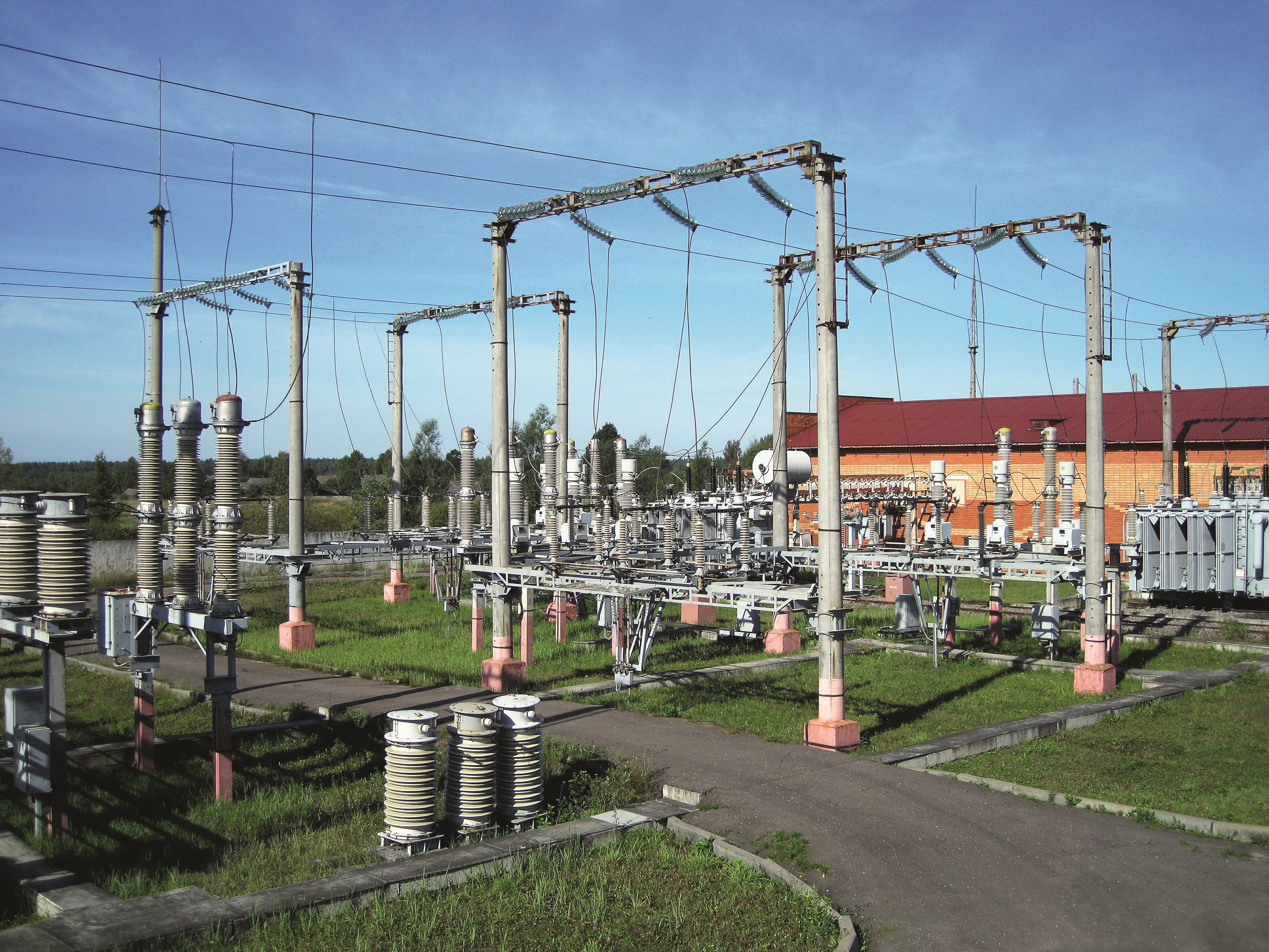
Construction of railway substation at the Saint-Petersburg — Moscow section

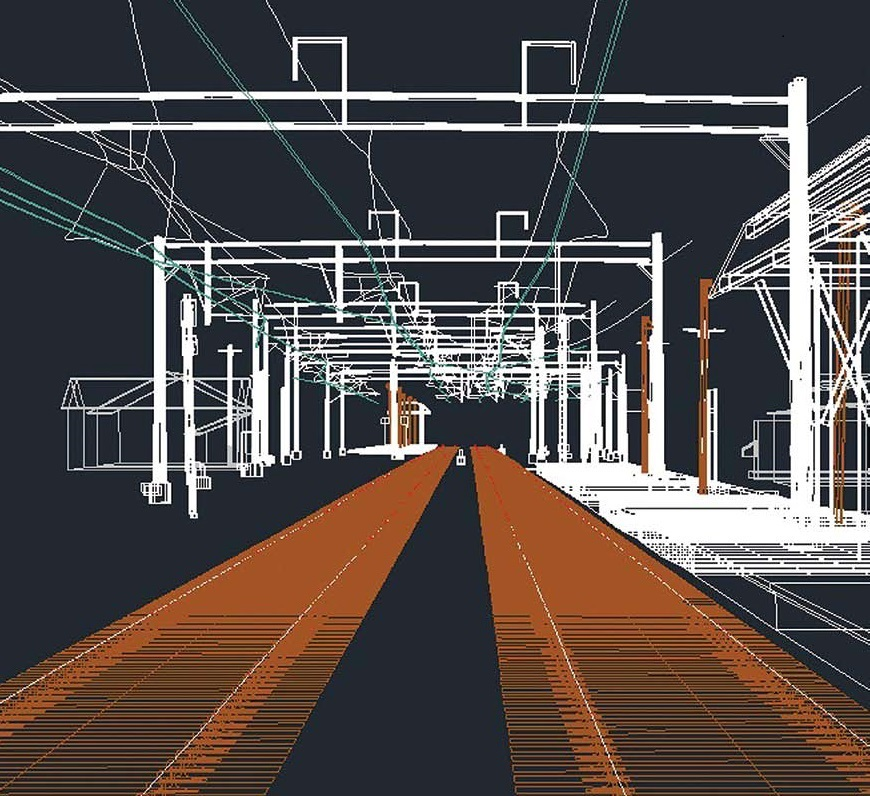
3D model of railway section

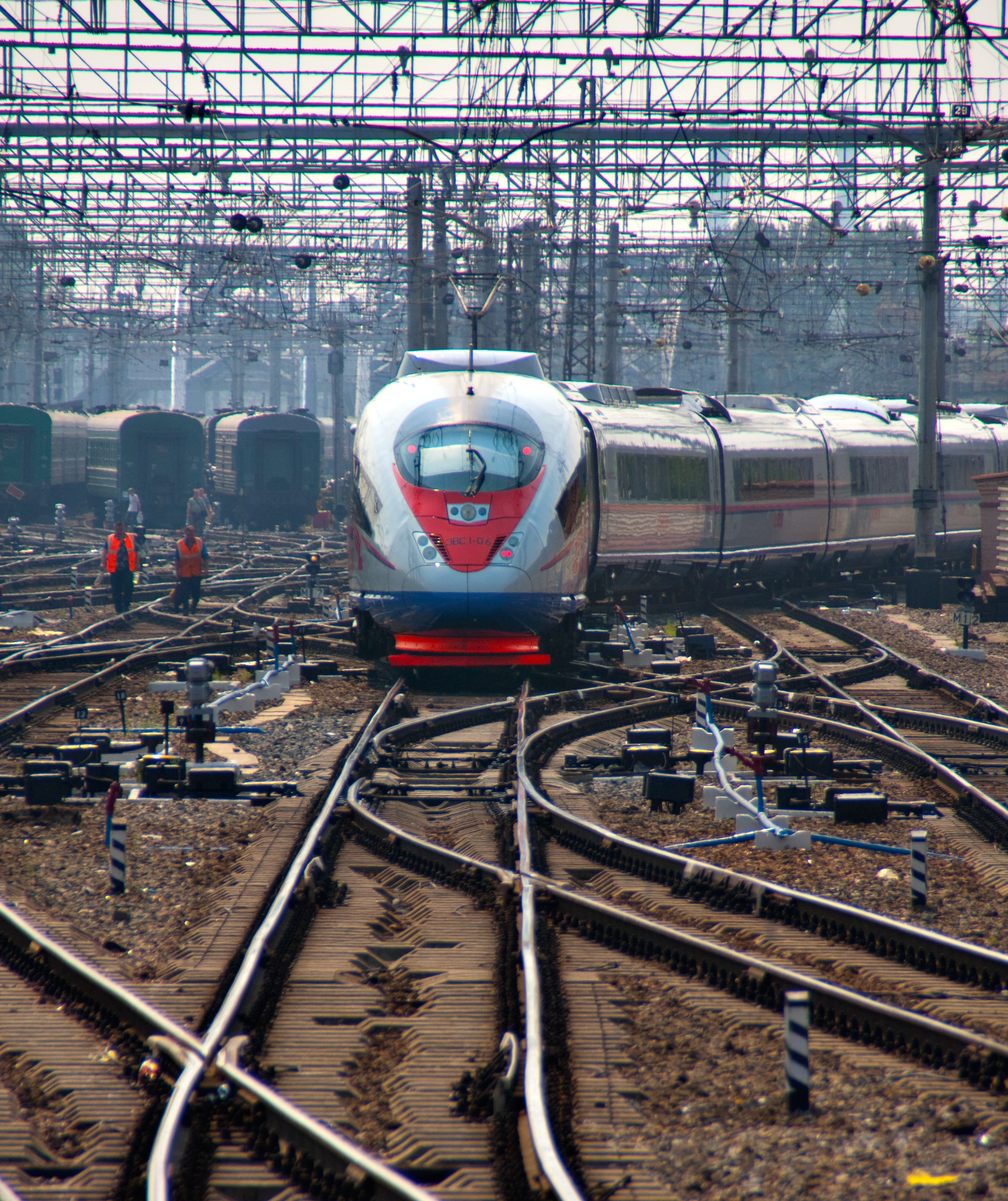
Arrangement of high-speed traffic at the Saint Petersburg – Moscow section

- Development of railway infrastructure in Eastern Polygon of JSC Russian Railways (renovation of the Trans-Siberian and the Baikal-Amur mainlines);
- Reconstruction and development of Small Moscow railway ring. Organization of passenger railway service;
- Complex renovation of railway stations and design of transport and transit centers for Moscow railway junction and Russian regions;
- Development of railway infrastructure to improve urban and suburban transport services at Yaroslavskoe, Gorkovskoe, Kurskoe, Kazanskoe, Paveletskoe, Kievskoe directions;
- Arrangements to increase railway traffic speed at the directions to Odintsovo, Usovo, Novopredelkino;
- Construction of side railway tracksand electrification of the Vyborg –Primorsk – Ermilovo section of the Oktyabrskaya Railway;
- Complex renovation of railway tracks on approaches to sea ports of Black and Baltic sea;
- Development of railway infrastructure of the Tobolsk – Surgut –Korotchaevo section of the Sverdlovskaya Railway;
- Complex development of the Mezhdurechensk – Taishet section of the Krasnoyarskaya Railway.

=== Several completed projects in Russia ===
- Arrangement of railway connection Sochi – Adler – Sochi airport and construction of a new segment Adler – Sochi airport as a part of transport system of Sochi-2014 Olympic objects;
- Renovation of concert hall in Omsk Region at 27a Lenina Str., Omsk
- Complex renovation of railway stations of Moscow railway junction;
- Complex renovation of Saint Petersburg — Moscow railway line to adapt to high speed passenger trains;
- Organization of passenger terminals for airline passenger check-in and transportation at Belorussky, Savyolovsky, Paveletsky and Kievsky railway terminals in Moscow
- Arrangement of high speed passenger communication at Moscow – Nizhny Novgorod direction
- Construction of orthodox church, Promyshlennaya Str., Lesosibirsk
- Construction of orthodox Church in Bolotnoe, Bolotnoe district, Novosibirsk Region
- Reconstruction of General Education School No. 56
- Construction of recreation facilities and rehabilitation centers
- Reconstruction of the Finlyandsky Railway Bridge on the river Neva in Saint Petersburg
- Construction of a new line at the Zhuravka – Millerovo section; completed 2017-08-07, 122.5 km double-track, 25 kV 50 Hz, maximum speed of 160 km/h, cost 56 billion RUB.

=== Major projects abroad ===
- Pre-design documentation for construction of new railway infrastructure in Mongolia
- Electrification of railways in Islamic Republic of Iran
- Participation in reconstruction project for railway line in Kazakhstan
- Design and survey works for reconstruction of railway section in Democratic People's Republic of Korea
- Overhaul of railway infrastructure at the section State border of Russian Federation – Sukhumi of the Abkhazian railway

== See also ==
- Russian Railways
- Rail transport in Russia
