= Federal Freight =

Russian railway business

- Company type: Joint-stock company
- Founded: 2010
- Headquarters: Ekaterinburg
- Owner: Russian Railways (100%)
- Website: Official website

The Federal Freight (Russian: Федеральная грузовая компания) is a railway business established in Russia by Russian Railways, as part of plans to open up the rail transport market in Russia. A fleet of 180 thousand freight wagons will be transferred to the new company from RZD. It will have a share capital of 46.4 billion rubles. The company is headquartered in Ekaterinburg.

Services began on 1 October 2010. Plans include fleet expansion - to approximately 200,000 freight wagons - and aggressive pricing to increase market share.

== Activity ==
FGC JSC provides cargo transportation services, including: round-the-clock dispatch supervision, freight forwarding and control in railway and multimodal communications, tariff formation, marketing and legal support of projects. It carries out both wagon and route shipments throughout Russia.

The bulk of the cargo transported by the Company is intended for the needs of the fuel and energy complex and housing and communal services, construction, metallurgy, agriculture and other key sectors of the Russian economy. Over the 10 years of the existence of FGC JSC, 1.5 billion tons of cargo have been transported in the operator's wagons.

The company takes into account the needs for the transportation of goods necessary for the implementation of the country's most important infrastructure projects. Throughout its history, FGC JSC has actively participated in projects for the development of oil and gas fields, the construction and maintenance of pipeline transport and housing infrastructure, the modernization of the BAM and Transsib, the construction of federal highways and large sports facilities, including the Sochi Olympics and the World Cup.

FGC JSC is developing comprehensive transport services — as of August 2022, 14 production sites were operating in Russia, and locomotive traction services have been provided by its own locomotives at 3 sites since 2020 (there are 4 shunting locomotives).

The net profit of JSC Federal Cargo Company (FGC) according to RAS increased 6.5 times in 2022, to 41.3 billion rubles from 6.4 billion rubles in 2021. The company's revenue is 99.3 billion rubles, gross profit is more than 56 billion rubles, profit from sales is 50.9 billion rubles.

== Structure ==
14 branches and transport service agencies have been opened throughout the entire range of Russian railways. Representative offices of FGC JSC are located in Moscow.

== Directors ==
The main founder and owner of the ordinary shares of FGC JSC is the Open Joint Stock Company Russian Railways. Joint Stock Company "Russian Railways Asset Management" (before the name change on June 26, 2020 — Joint Stock Company "KP-invest") owns one ordinary share of the company.

General Director is Dmitry Murev.
