= Freight One =

- Type: Private
- Industry: Freight logistics
- Founded: 2010
- Headquarters: Moscow, Russia
- Area served: Freight logistics
- Key people: 1. JSC Aurora Invest; CEO - Mr. Matvey Gorokhin: 2. Public Joint Stock Company Freight One CEO — Mr Oleg Romanov; Subsidiaries: 3. Joint Stock Company “Railcar Repairs Gryazi” CEO — Mr Alexey Koniaev; 4. Limited Liability Company “Railcar Repairs Zarinsk” CEO — Mr Sergey Klimenko; 5. Joint Stock Company “SteelTrans” CEO — Mr Alexey Gorbunov; 6. Freight One Central Asia Limited Liability Partnership; CEO — Mr Farid Leonov
- Revenue: 98 bln RUB (2017)
- Operating income: 21,5 bln RUB (2020)
- Net income: 26,2 bln RUB (2020)
- Total assets: 154,9 bln RUB (2020)
- Total equity: 108,6 bln RUB (2020)
- Owner: Aurora Invest
- Number of employees: 3446 (2021)
- Parent: Aurora Invest
- Website: pgk.ru

The Freight One (Russian: Первая грузовая компания) is the largest privately owned high-tech company rendering freight logistics services in Russia and abroad. The company was the part of Fletcher Group Holdings Limited controlled by Russian billionaire Vladimir Lisin. In 2023, the company was sold to a new owner, JSC Aurora Invest. Freight One owns over 100,000 units of rolling stock of different types and shipped over 160 million tons of freight in 2021, reclaiming its status as leader in terms of volume of traffic and cargo turnover in Russia.

In 2021 the company stated that it will invest around $200 million into its rolling stock, including buying of its own containers and building container terminals.

Freight One owns car repair factories situated in different regions of Russian Federation. One of these factories - Joint Stock Company “Railcar Repairs Gryazi” specializes in current and full repair of rail cars, including low sided cars, platforms, pellet carriers and cement lorries. Industrial capacity of this factory is around 7.8 units annually. Another car repair factory Limited Liability Company “Railcar Repairs Zarinsk” is scheduled for opening in 2022.

== Carriages ==
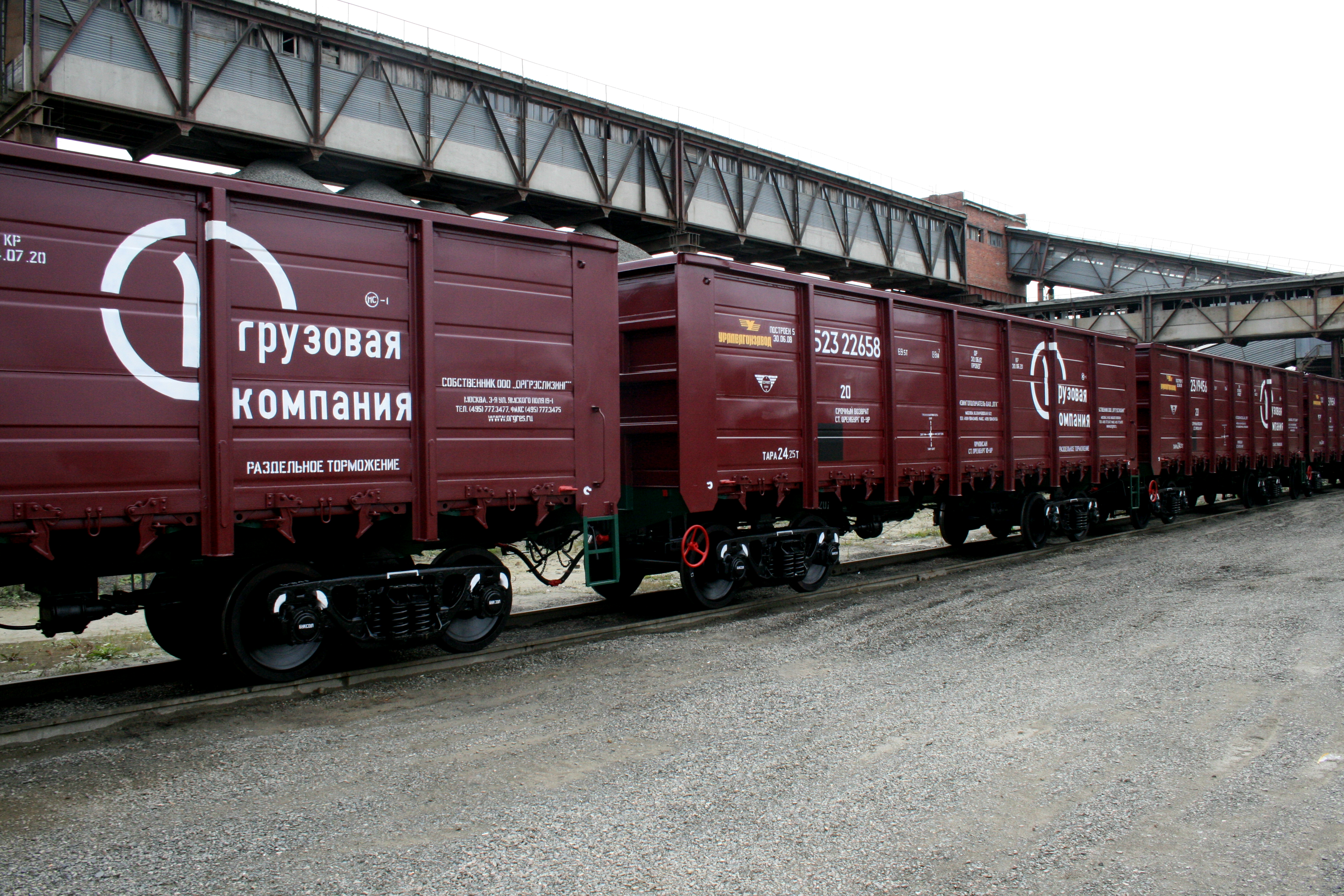

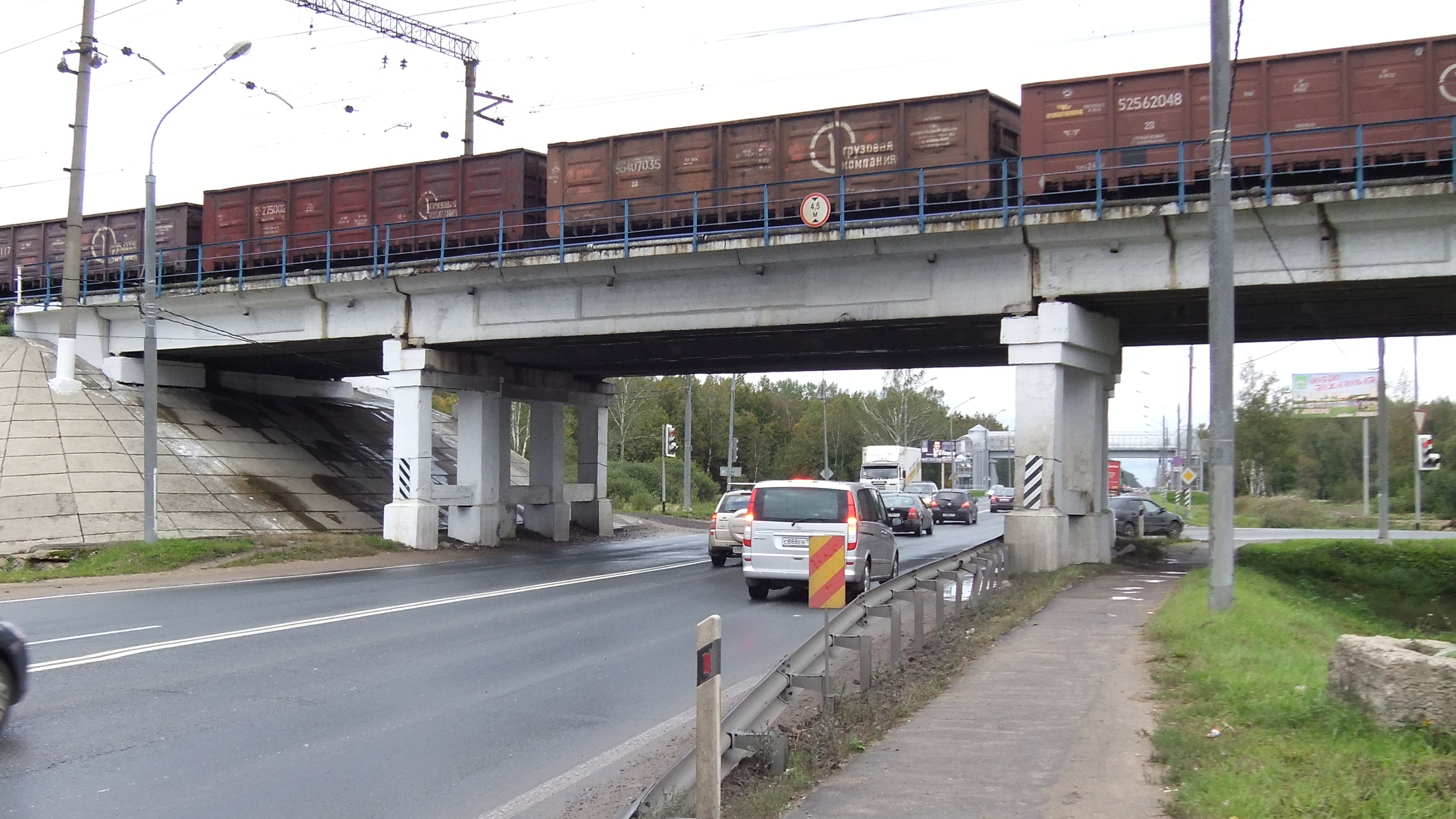

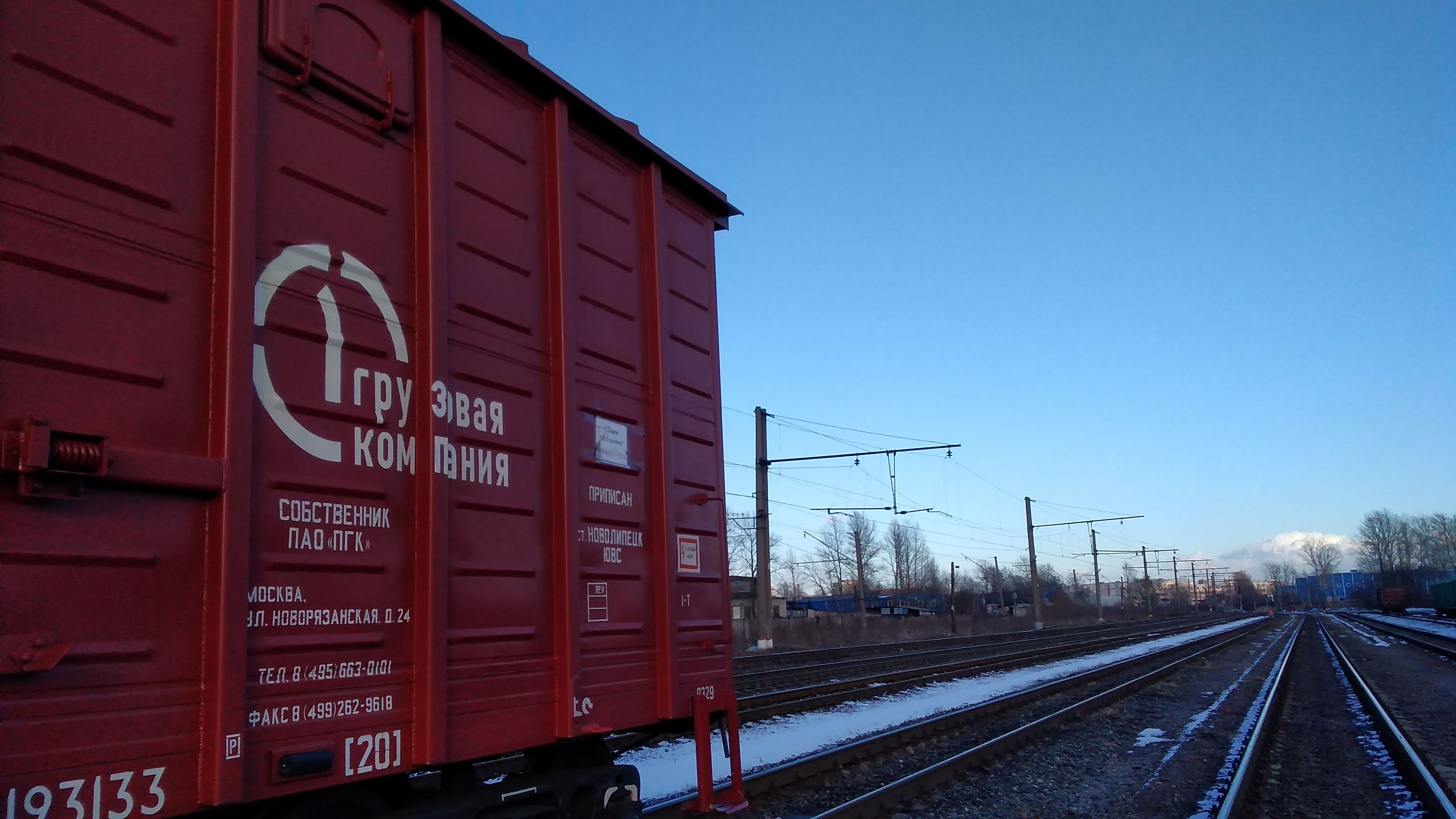
