= Kaliningrad Railway =

Russian transport company

Kaliningrad Railway Калининградская железная дорога
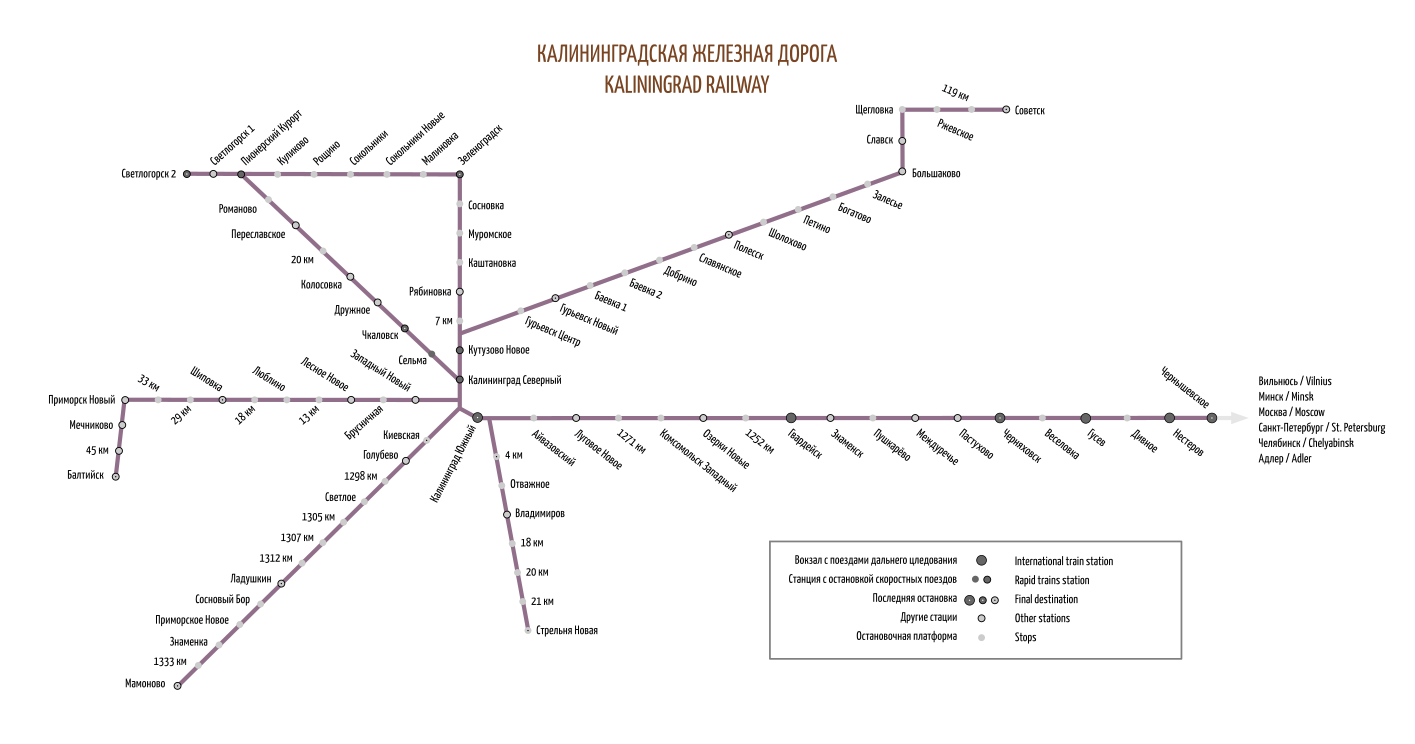
- Scheme of passenger railway lines in Kaliningrad Oblast

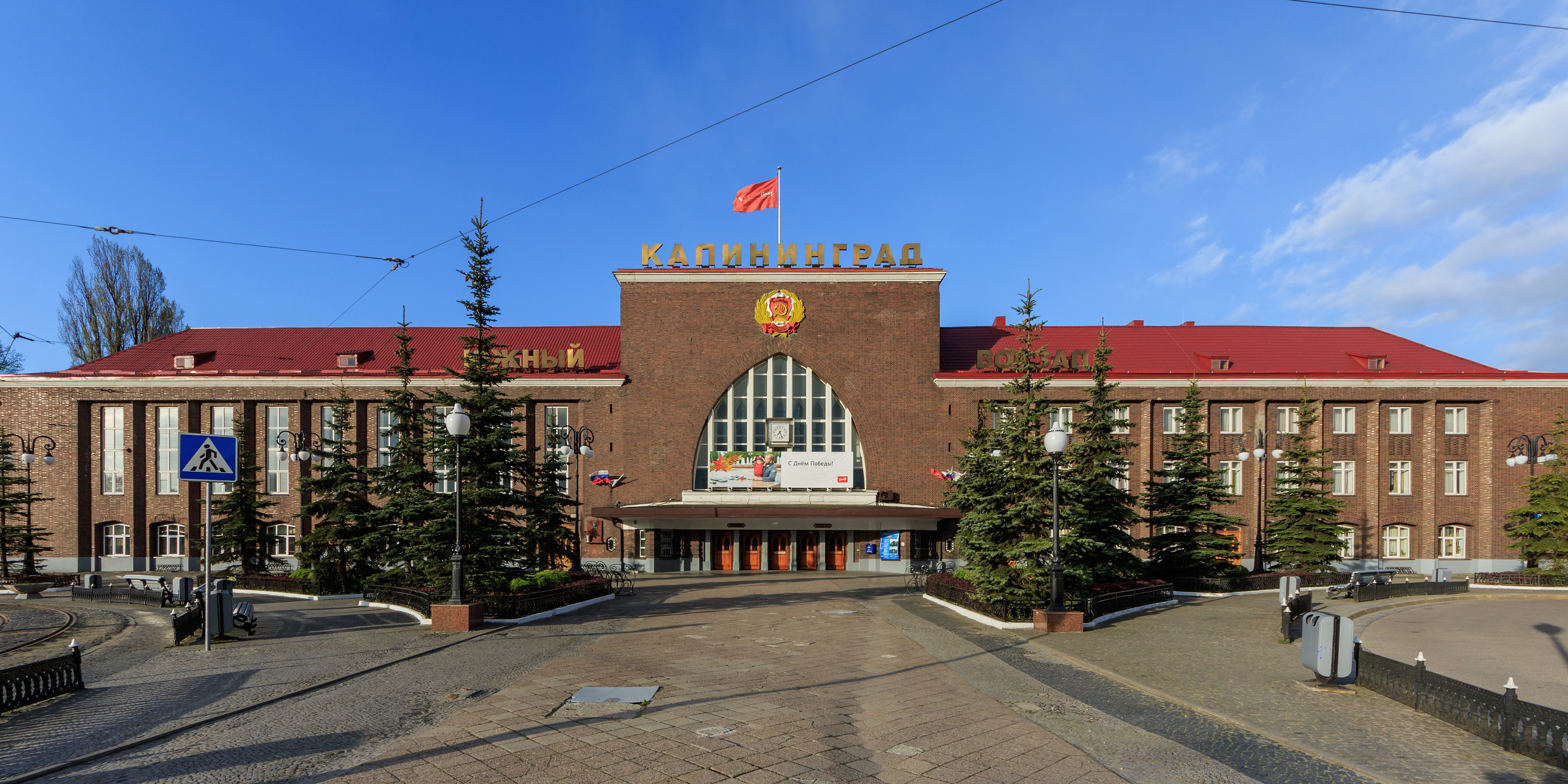
- Kaliningrad Railway station is the biggest on the railway.

Overview
- Headquarters: Kaliningrad
- Locale: Kaliningrad Oblast, Russia
- Dates of operation: 1992–present
- Predecessor: Pribaltic Railway (USSR)

Technical
- Track gauge: 1,435 mm (4 ft 8 1/2 in), 1,520 mm (4 ft 11 27/32 in)

Other
- Website: Press here

Kaliningrad Railway (Russian: Калининградская железная дорога) is the smallest subsidiary of the Russian Railways by route length (618 km) and differs from other Russian railways in having a string of standard gauge lines.

== Main information ==
The railway is headquartered in Kaliningrad. Most lines were built by the Prussian Eastern Railway before the Second World War. The railway terminal in Kaliningrad, currently known as Yuzhny Vokzal, was opened in 1929 as Königsberg Hauptbahnhof. It was separated from the Pribaltic Railway after the breakup of the Soviet Union in 1992.

Map of Kaliningrad railway (2020)

Two lines are electrified and are used by commuter EMU traffic.

Electrification on the Kaliningrad railway as of 2016.

Commuter train frequency, 2016

Many railways that did exist before World war 2 were closed down after the war. Most remaining railways were rebuilt from standard gauge to Russian gauge. The exception is the railway from Kaliningrad towards Mamonovo and Elbląg in Poland, which has one track of each gauge.
