= Russian Railways =

State-owned railway company in Russia

OJSC "Russian Railways"

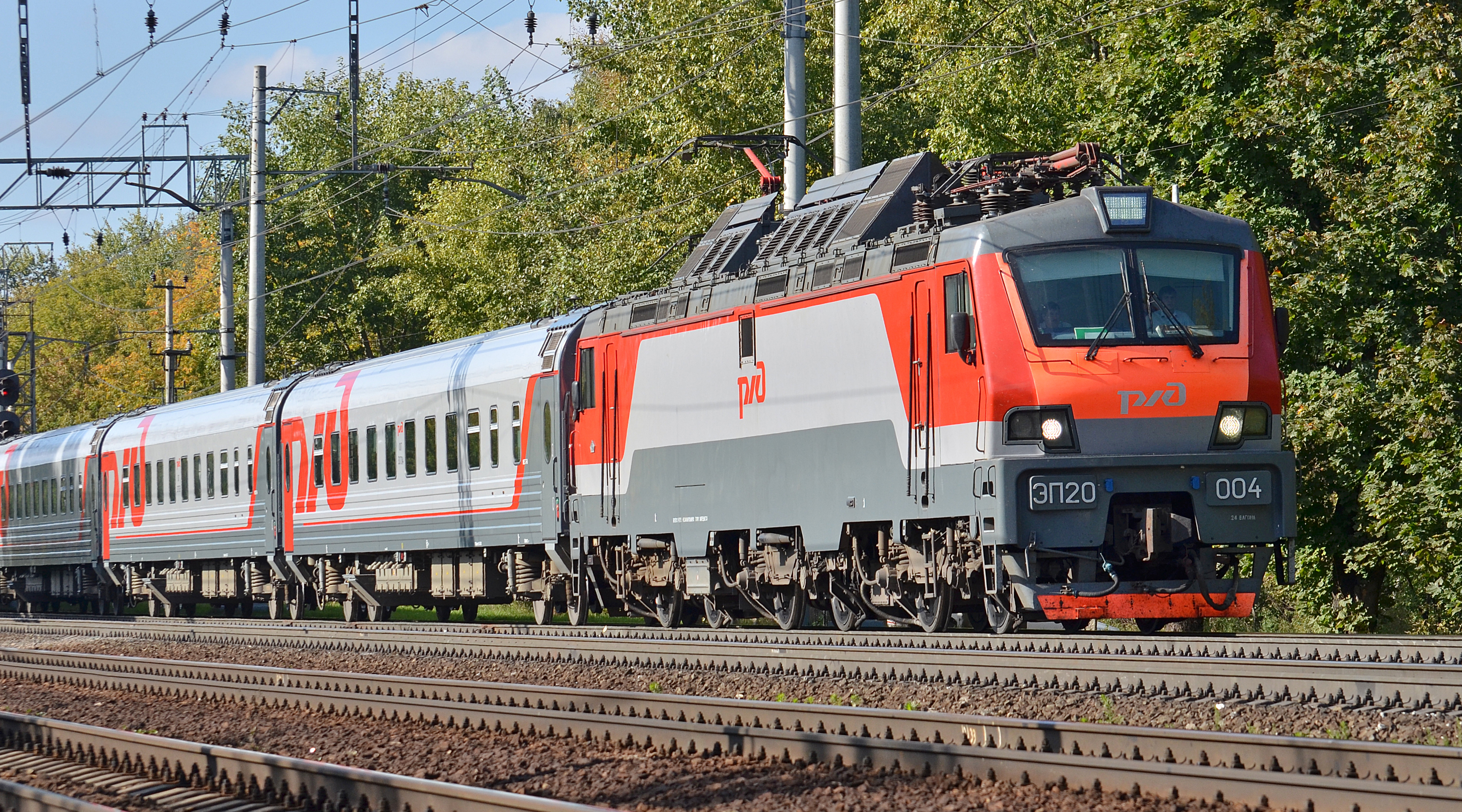
- Native name: ОАО «Российские железные дороги»
- Romanized name: OAO «Rossiyskiye zheleznyye dorogi»
- Type: Open joint-stock company
- Industry: Railways
- Predecessor: Ministry of Railways of the Russian Federation (1992–2004)
- Founded: 18 September 2003; 22 years ago
- Headquarters: Red Gates Square (55°46′N 37°39′E), Moscow, Russia
- Area served: Russia, Belarus
- Key people: Oleg Belozyorov (CEO); Vitaly Savelyev (Chairman)
- Services: Passenger trains, Rail transport, Cargo, High-speed rail
- Revenue: ₽ 1.5989 trillion (2024)
- Operating income: ₽ 254.9 billion (2024)
- Net income: ₽ 114 billion (2024)
- Total assets: ₽ 4.47 trillion (2017)
- Total equity: ₽ 2.41 trillion (2017)
- Owner: Russian Government (100%)
- Number of employees: 740,315 (2017)
- Website: eng.rzd.ru

OJSC Russian Railways (Russian: ОАО «Российские железные дороги», romanized: OAO «Rossiyskiye zheleznyye dorogi»; shortened as RZD or RZhD; РЖД) is a Russian fully state-owned vertically integrated railway company, both managing infrastructure and operating freight and passenger train services and has a near-monopoly on long-distance train travel in Russia.

The company was established on 18 September 2003, when a decree was passed to separate the upkeep and operation of the railways from the Ministry of Railways of the Russian Federation, which in turn was the successor of the USSR Ministry of Railways. RZhD is based in Moscow at Novaya Basmannaya str., 2. The operating units of the central part of the staff are at Kalanchevskaya str., 35.

Railways in Russian-occupied territories of Ukraine are controlled by Crimea Railway and Novorossiya Railway, both companies being independent from RZD. As of 2026, the company is reported to be in heavy debts of $45 billion (4 trillion rubles).

== History ==
=== Background and 2003 reform ===
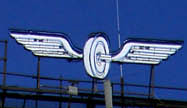
The old RZD logo

After the collapse of the Soviet Union in 1991, the Russian Federation inherited 17 of the 32 regions of the former Soviet Railways (SZD).

In the mid-1990s, the profitability of railway transportation of the Russian Ministry of Railways fell to negative values, the bureaucratization of the ministry itself was publicly criticized, which became an occasion for reforms. Shortly after being elected president of Russia in 2000, Vladimir Putin approved the idea of reforming the railway transport, according to which all economic functions on the railway should be transferred to a joint-stock company with 100% state participation. The start of the state program for reforming the Russian railway sector was given by the establishment of Russian Railways in October 2003. The new company received over 95% of the assets belonging to the Ministry of Railways of the Russian Federation.

In 2003, the Federal Law on Railway Transport divided the Ministry of Railways into the Federal Railway Transport Agency (FRTA) and Russian Railways (RZD). The reform also required RZD to provide access to railway infrastructure to other carriers and operators. As the law requires carriers to provide service to customers anywhere in Russia, RZD retained its dominant position.

Later in 2003, the Decree No. 585 established RZD as a joint stock company, making it a holding in charge of 63 subsidiaries, including TransContainer, RailTranAuto, Rail Passenger Directorate, Russian Troika, TransGroup, and Refservis. RZD acquired 987 companies (95% in asset value) out of the 2046 that had formed the MR system. Gennady Fadeyev, the Railways Minister, became the company's first president.

The reform saw the creation of a new market segment following the privatization of the network's rolling stock. The company divided the bulk of its wagon fleet between two new operating companies, Freight One (which was later privatised) and Freight Two (renamed Federal Freight in 2012), and private players such as GlobalTrans also entering the market.

=== 2000s ===
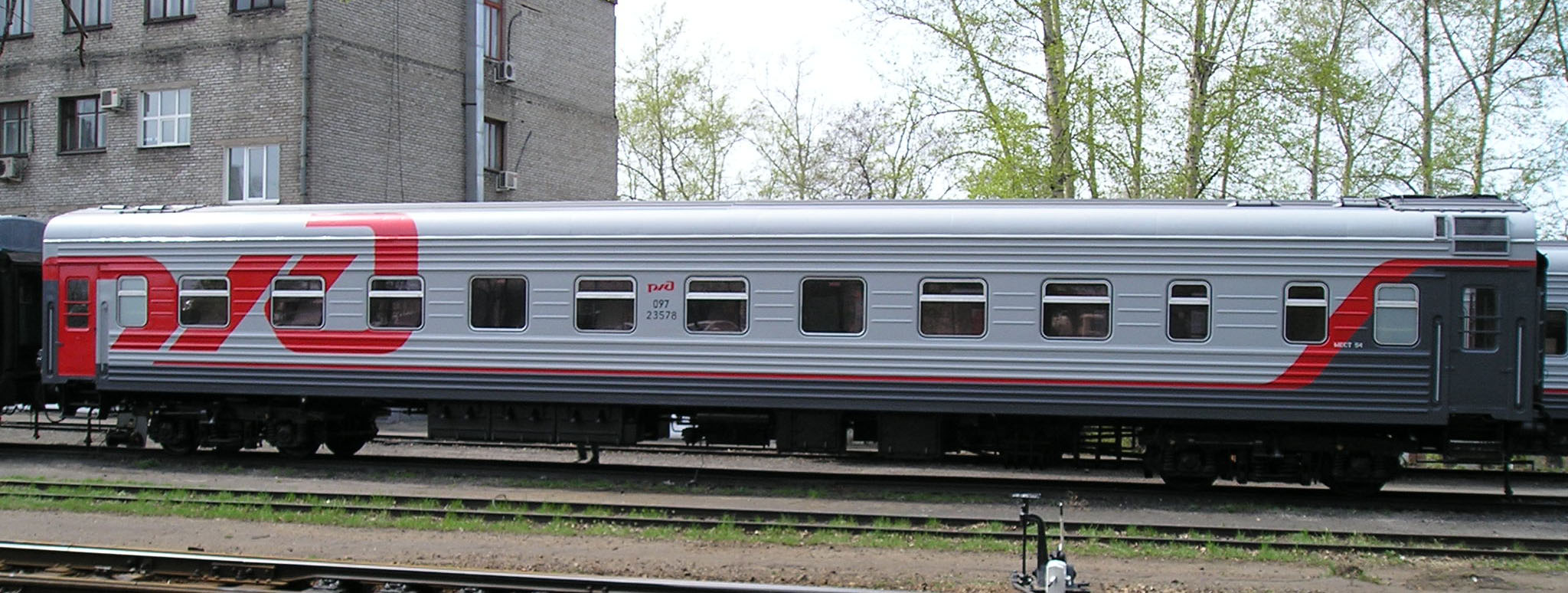
Model 61-4194 reserved seat car bearing the new corporate livery of Russian Railways

In 2003, RZD launched a project to replace the narrow gauge on Sakhalin Railway to the broad gauge used in the rest of Russia, which it formally completed in August 2019. The share of privately owned wagons in the freight transport increased to one-third of the total by 2005. On 18 May 2006, the company signed an agreement with Siemens for the delivery of eight high-speed trains.

On 23 May 2007, Russian Railways adopted a new corporate style which changed fundamentally the way the Company presented itself visually to the outside world. The change of corporate identity underwent several stages during the 2007–2010 period. The final version of the logo was designed by BBDO Branding.

Also, commissioned by BBDO Branding The Agency HardCase Design created a family of corporate fonts RussianRail, consisting of 15 fonts. In the new company logo Sans-serif RussianRail Grotesque Medium was used. In 2008, the new logo of Russian Railways became a runner-up for the international design competition WOLDA '08 award.

Strategy 2030, an investment plan to expand and modernize the railway network, was approved by the Russian government in 2008. Since 2008, as part of the structural reform of rail transport, with separation of the services infrastructure of transportation activity and the emergence of a competitive environment, Russian Railways has been transformed into a vertically oriented holding company.

In 2009, the investment budget was 262.8 billion rubles (excluding VAT), of which 47.4 billion for projects related to the preparation and staging of the Olympic Games in Sochi; 58.7 billion for the renovation of the rolling stock (including supply of Sapsan trains).

=== 2010s ===
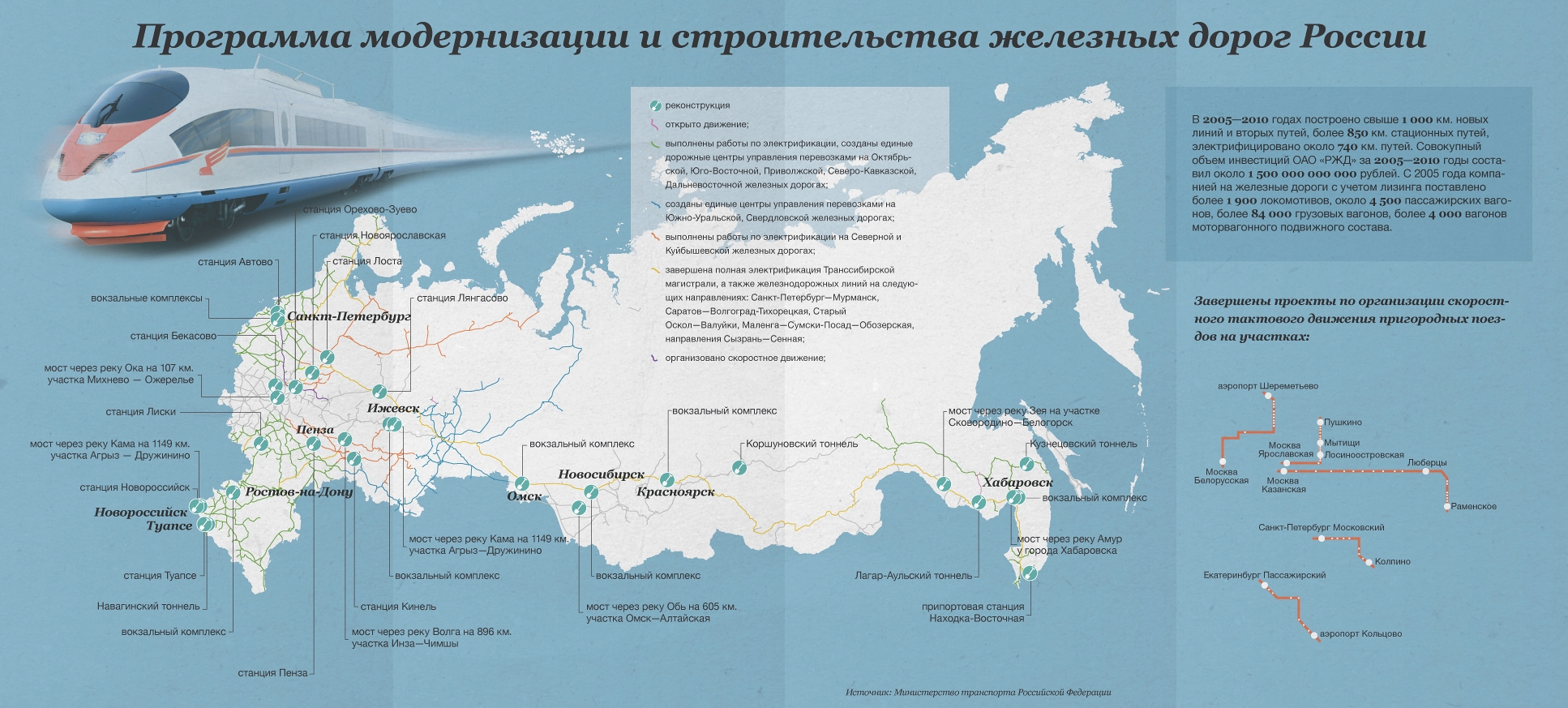
2005–2010 modernization program of Russian Railways

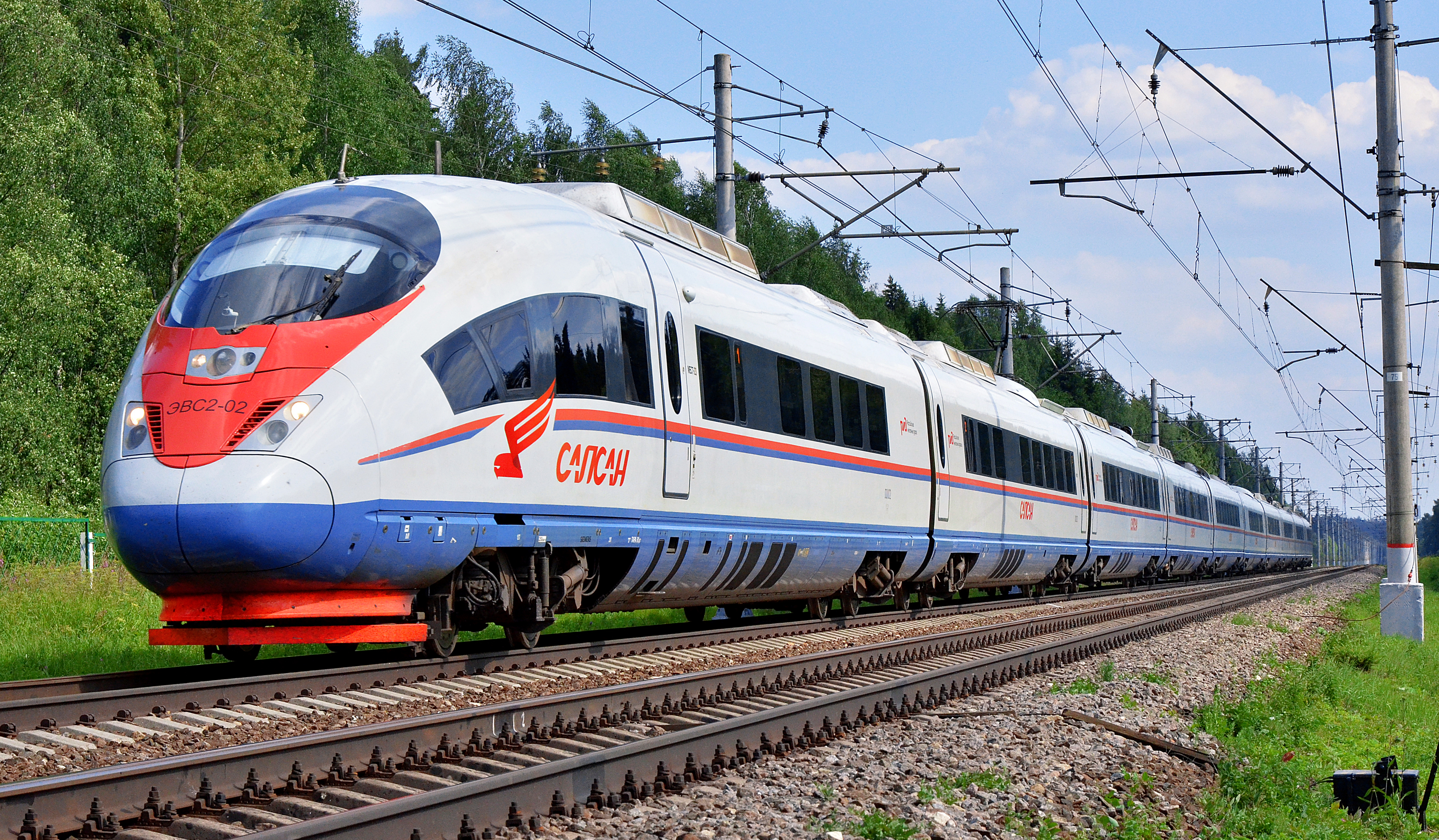
Sapsan high-speed train (Siemens Velaro Rus), the flagship of Russian Railways

In 2010, Federal Passenger Company was established as a fully owned subsidiary of Russian Railways, providing long-distance passenger services both in Russia and abroad. By the end of 2013, it operated all long-distance routes, except for high-speed Sapsan lines, which are operated by RZD.

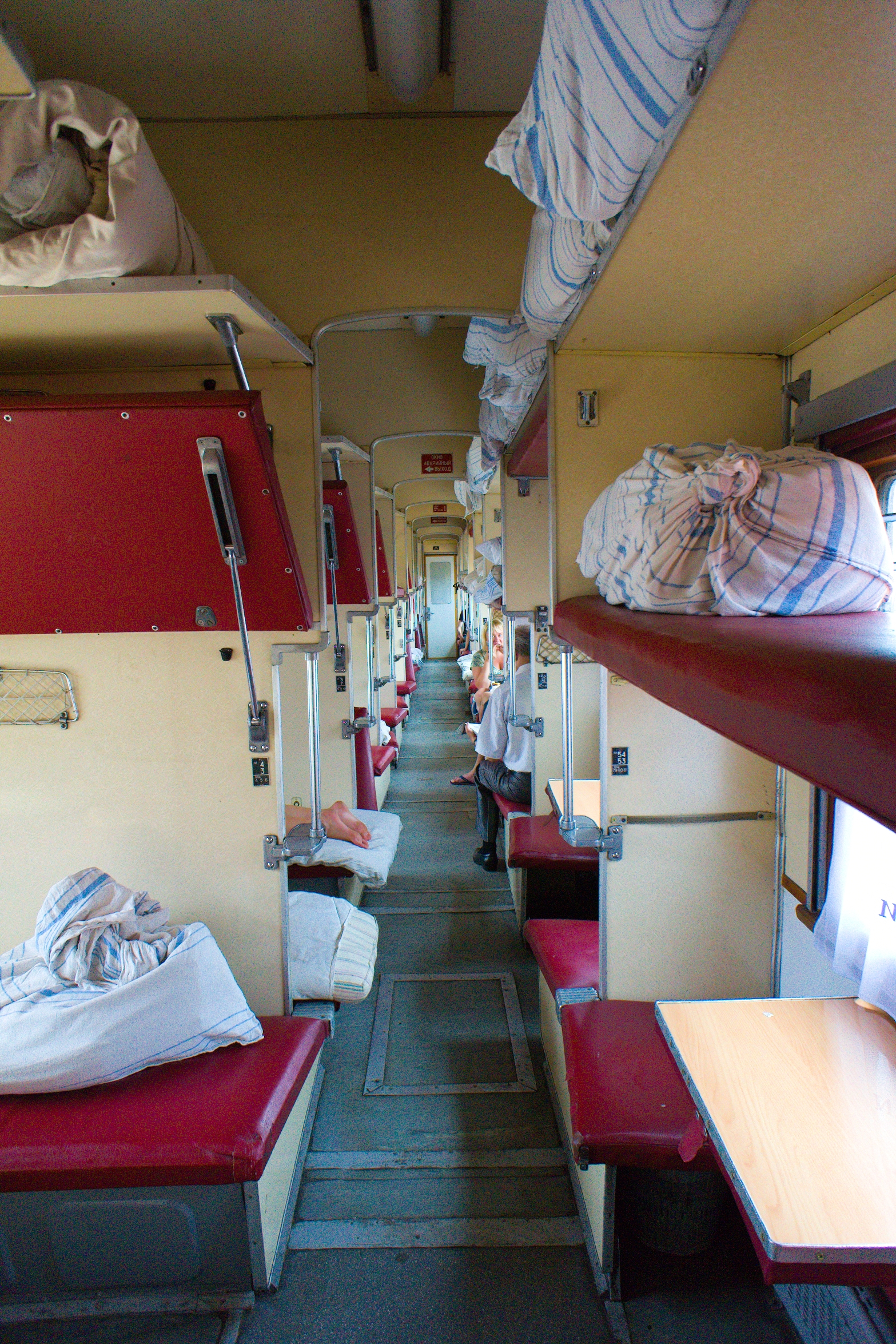
Platzkart carriages

RZD issued its first dollar-denominated bond in 2010, raising $1.5 billion. On 28 October 2011, the Joint Stock Company Freight One, a subsidiary of Russian Railways, sold 75% of its shares minus two shares for 125.5 billion rubles (about 4 billion $) to Independent Transport Company owned by Vladimir Lisin. Thus, Lisin as Russia's largest operator of rolling stock acquired control of a quarter of the freight market.

As part of its reform efforts, RZD massively reduced its workforce, from 2.2 million in the 1990s to 934,000 people in 2012. In 2012, it became one of the three largest transport companies in the world.

According to a Reuters inquiry, RZD procurement activities in 2012 amounted to $22.5 billion; part of this was awarded to private contractors with no genuine operations in de facto noncompetitive tenders. Some of the company addresses listed on the tenders turned out to be private apartments, car repair shops or department stores. It was alleged that the contractors were actually shell companies, used to convey billions of dollars in tenders to close associates of Yakunin, president of RZD.

Zheldoripoteka, RZD's real estate arm, was revealed to have sold land plots located close to railway stations in major cities to the son of Russian Railways president Vladimir Yakunin. Far East Land Bridge, a company partnered with a Russian Railways subsidiary, was also linked to Yakunin's son.

On 16 October 2012, Russian Railways has completed competitive negotiations with potential buyers of the remaining 25-percent plus 1 share stake in JSC Freight One. The best binding offer was received from the Independent Transport Company LLC. The assets were sold for 50 billion rubles.

In early November 2012, Russian Railways announced the purchase of 75% of the French logistics company Gefco SA. The total value of the transaction was 800 million euros, the seller being PSA Peugeot Citroen, the parent company of Gefco. A program to modernize the Baikal–Amur Mainline was launched in 2013, costing the equivalent of £4 billion by 2018.

In 2015, RZD International won a €1.2 billion contract to electrify the Garmsar–Inche Bourun line in Iran.

In August 2015, company president Vladimir Yakunin was dismissed, allegedly because of poor performance and mismanagement. Yakunin was replaced by Oleg Belozyorov.

RZD International began works on the reconstruction of the Serbian Vinarci – Djordjevo line in 2016. The Moscow Central Circle railway, designed and managed by Roszheldorproject, an RZD subsidiary, opened in September 2016. In July 2018, the company announced plans to phase out third-class carriages on long-distance trains by 2025.

=== 2020s ===
On 8 April 2022, the shipping company CMA CGM announced to be acquiring the French logistics company Gefco SA from Russian Railways and minority shareholder Stellantis.

On 11 April 2022, the Wall Street Journal and Reuters reported that the International Swaps and Derivatives Association had determined a "failure to pay" credit event occurred on 250 million CHF worth of Swiss franc loan participation notes linked to an entity related to Russian Railways, RZD Capital. The determination is considered the first step to triggering a credit default swap.

In December 2023 the joint venture with the VR Group, Finnish Railways, to run the Karelian Trains ceased, the trains having stopped running in March 2022 following the Russian invasion of Ukraine and Russian Railways having failed to meet their portion of the financing obligations, VR Group assumed the whole financial obligations and took over the rolling stock.

== Future projects ==
=== Planned projects ===
In March 2016, RZD approved an updated version of high-speed rail development program until 2030. The 5 trillion ruble program includes the construction of Moscow–Kazan–Yekaterinburg, Moscow–Adler and Moscow–Saint Petersburg high-speed lines, as well as other high-speed lines connecting regional cities.

The construction program is divided into three stages. By 2020, Russian Railways planned to put into operation the high-speed rail sections linking Moscow–Kazan (1.2 trillion rubles), Moscow–Tula (268.6 billion rubles), Chelyabinsk–Yekaterinburg (122.6 billion rubles), Tula–Belgorod (86.8 billion rubles), Yekaterinburg–Nizhny Tagil (12.9 billion rubles) and Novosibirsk–Barnaul (62.3 billion rubles). The project design of the largest container port in Ust-Luga for reception and distribution of containerized freight on China–Europe route is also part of the program.

Between 2021 and 2025 RZD plans to build Rostov–Krasnodar–Adler, Tula–Voronezh high-speed rail and the extension of Kazan-Yelabuga high-speed rail, as well as other regional high-speed rail links.

During the 2026–2030 third phase of the program, Russian Railways will build Moscow–Saint Petersburg high-speed rail section; the railway line will be extended from Yelabuga to Yekaterinburg, and from Voronezh to Rostov-on-Don.

=== Proposed projects ===
In March 2015, at a meeting of the Russian Academy of Science, Vladimir Yakunin presented an ambitious new transport route called the Trans-Eurasian Belt Development (TEPR) which would go "through Russia with a mega road and high-speed rail network to link Asia with Europe' and with the opportunity to go to Chukotka and Bering Strait and then to the American continent" to Alaska, "making overland trips from Britain to the US (via the Channel Tunnel) a possibility."

Limited railway capacity is the main bottleneck for Russian coal exports to Asia. Demand for Russian coal in Europe has declined due to the energy transition and Russia's invasion of Ukraine and this reinforces the need for Russia to reorient coal exports to Asia. Various Russian actors have therefore proposed the rapid expansion of the country's eastward rail capacity.

== Owners and management ==
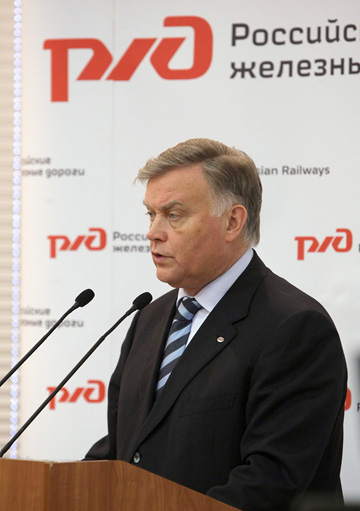
Vladimir Yakunin, former president of Russian Railways

The Russian Federation is the founder and sole shareholder of JSC Russian Railways. On behalf of its shareholders the powers are exercised by the Government of the Russian Federation. It approves the president of the company, forms the board of directors annually and approves the annual reports.

An IPO for the company was considered in 2012, but it was pushed back to after 2020.

The chairman of the Board of Directors of JSC Russian Railways is Oleg Belozerov. Before him, the position was occupied by Kirill Androsov from September 2011 till June 2015, and previously by Alexander Zhukov – from 20 July 2004 to September 2011 and Viktor Khristenko – from 16 October 2003 – 20 July 2004.

Gennady Fadeev was President of JSC Russian Railways from 23 September 2003 – 14 June 2005. He was succeeded by Vladimir Yakunin – from 14 June 2005 to 20 August 2015. Oleg Belozyorov has been president of the company since 20 August 2015.

=== Subsidiaries ===
As of December 2013, Russian Railways has controlling interests in the following companies:

- Federal Passenger Company (100%);
- Gefco S.A. (75%);
- Federal Freight (100%);
- TransContainer (50.6%);
- Refservice (100%);
- RailTransAuto (51%);
- High-speed Rail Lines (100%);
- RZDstroy (100%);
- Roszheldorproject (55.56%);
- RZD Trading Company (50% + 1)
- TransTeleCom (100%);
- Zhilsotsipoteka (100%);
- Zheldoripoteka (100%);
- TransWoodService (100%);
- BetElTrans (100%);
- First Nonmetallic Company (100%);
- Zeleznodorozhnaya Torgovaya Kompaniya (100%);
- Wagon Repair Company – 1 (100%);
- Wagon Repair Company – 2 (100%);
- Wagon Repair Company – 3 (100%);
- Kaluga Plant Remputmash (100%);
- Incorporated Electrotechnical Plants (50 + 1).

=== Sanctions ===
On 24 February 2022, in response to Russia's invasion of Ukraine, US President Joe Biden announced economic sanctions against several Russian companies, including Russian Railways.

== Activities ==
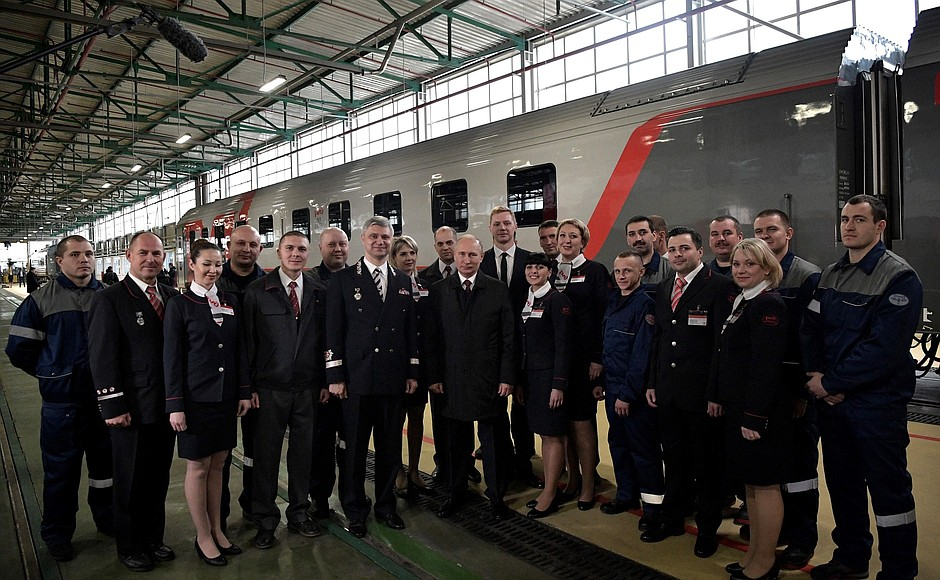
RZD staff during a presidential visit to a maintenance depot

The main activities of Russian Railways involve freight and passenger traffic. In Russia, railways carry 42% of the total cargo traffic, and about 33% of passenger traffic. Some passenger categories, such as pensioners, members of parliament, and holders of Soviet and Russian state decorations, receive free or subsidized tickets.

=== Freight traffic ===
In 2013 railways carried nearly 90% of Russia's freight, excluding pipelines. In 2014, railway infrastructure and locomotive services accounted for 74% of the company's total revenue.

The cost of freight tariff is determined by the Federal Tariff Service at net cost or higher.

Limited railway capacity is the main factor limiting Russian coal exports to Asia. Demand for Russian coal in Europe has declined due to the energy transition and Russia's invasion of Ukraine and this reinforces the need for Russia to reorient coal exports to Asia. As of January 2026, the company is facing a deep financial crisis as its debt soars to about $45 billion because of a sharp decline in freight traffic. The downturn in industrial output, sanctions, and falling demand have squeezed its revenues, forcing cuts to investment and cost saving measures while threatening its long-term financial stability.

=== Long-distance travel ===
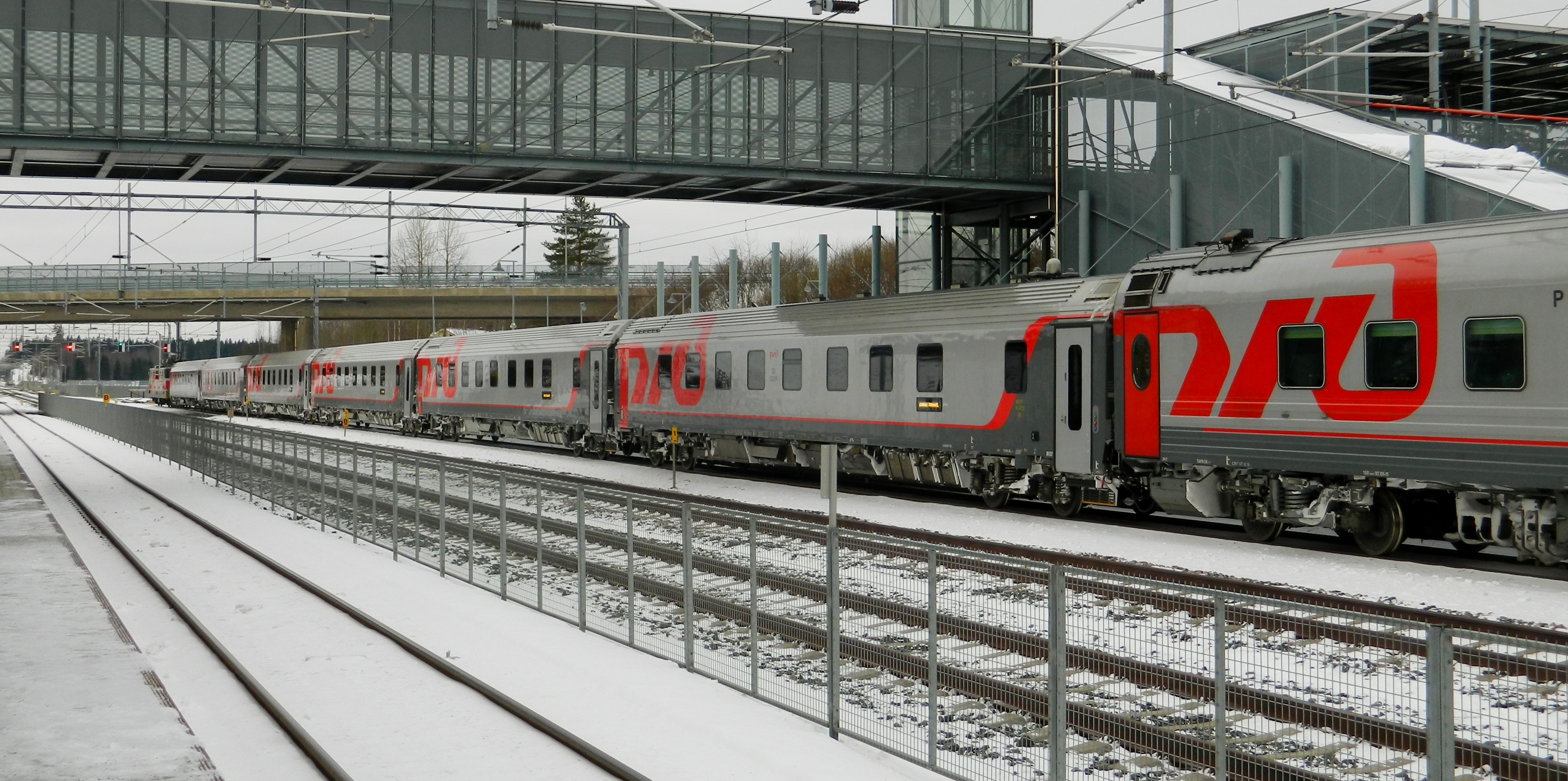
Tolstoi (juna) at the Riihimäki–Saint Petersburg railway line 2016

Russian Railways has a near-monopoly on long-distance train travel, with its subsidiary, Federal Passenger Company, accounting for 90% of total passenger turnover in 2017. Passenger transportation accounted for 10.6% of the company's revenue in 2017. The long-distance passenger fleet includes 19,386 rail cars as of 2017, with an average age of 19.1 years. Over 60% of long-distance passengers travel in third-class sleeping carriages.

The long-distance rail passenger business is under increasing competition from airlines, due to their aggressive domestic pricing policies and generally shorter travel times for routes under 1,000 km. International rail passenger traffic dropped from 19.4 million passengers in 2013 to 6.8 million in 2017.

In 2005–2010, JSC Russian Railways has launched a program to introduce new high-speed trains. The first train, Sapsan, commenced service in December 2009 and connects Saint Petersburg, Moscow and Nizhny Novgorod and is operated with trains manufactured by the German company Siemens.

The second train, Allegro, owned and operated together with the Finnish VR Group, ran from Saint Petersburg to Helsinki via Vyborg from December 2010 until service was suspended in March 2022 due to sanctions following Russia's invasion of Ukraine.

Sapsan was the most successful passenger train of JSC Russian Railways with occupancy rate of 84.5% (according to RZD in 2010) and profitability of 30% (although capital costs were not included in its calculation).

==== Fares on long distance trains ====
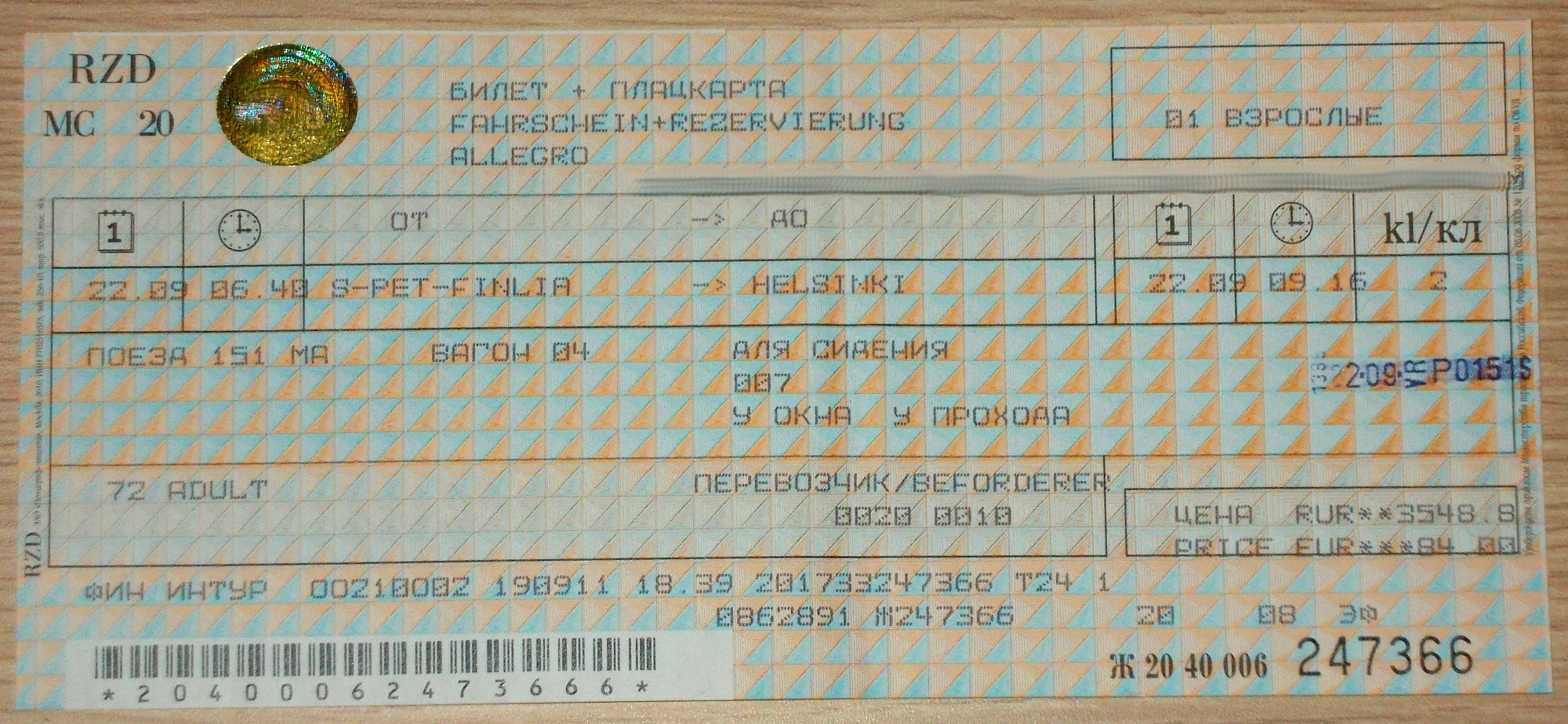
Allegro train ticket

Passenger tariffs (except for travelling in the stateroom, sleeping and VIP-cars) are approved by the State, represented by the Federal Tariff Service with social orientation of its traffic operations below cost. Passenger fare is divided into two components: «ticket» (which includes the cost of transport infrastructure, locomotive traction and the Station component) and «reserved seat» (service of transport company, which is the owner of the car). Since 2003, the flexible schedule tariffs (FST) to travel on long-distance trains is used:

- in the period of keen demand the rate is above the annual average by 5–20% (earlier it was up to +45%)
- approximately the third part of the year the base rate is active
- during the periods of low passenger's traffic the rate is lower by 5–20%. On certain days of the year (from 1 to 3 days, at different times on such days as 31.12, 01.01 and dates around 9 May) the index of 45–50% is valid when tickets are twice cheaper.

FST is calculated in such a way as to stimulate passengers to undertake a trip on the date with the lowest index. In 2010 and 2011, the average weighted index for calendar periods was 0.97 and the average volume of passenger traffic – 1.00. According to the JSC Russian Railways statement, the passenger transportation – except for some highly profitable directions – is unprofitable. These losses are partly compensated from the budget, and for the most part – with the help of cross-subsidies by income from freight.

=== Suburban passenger companies ===
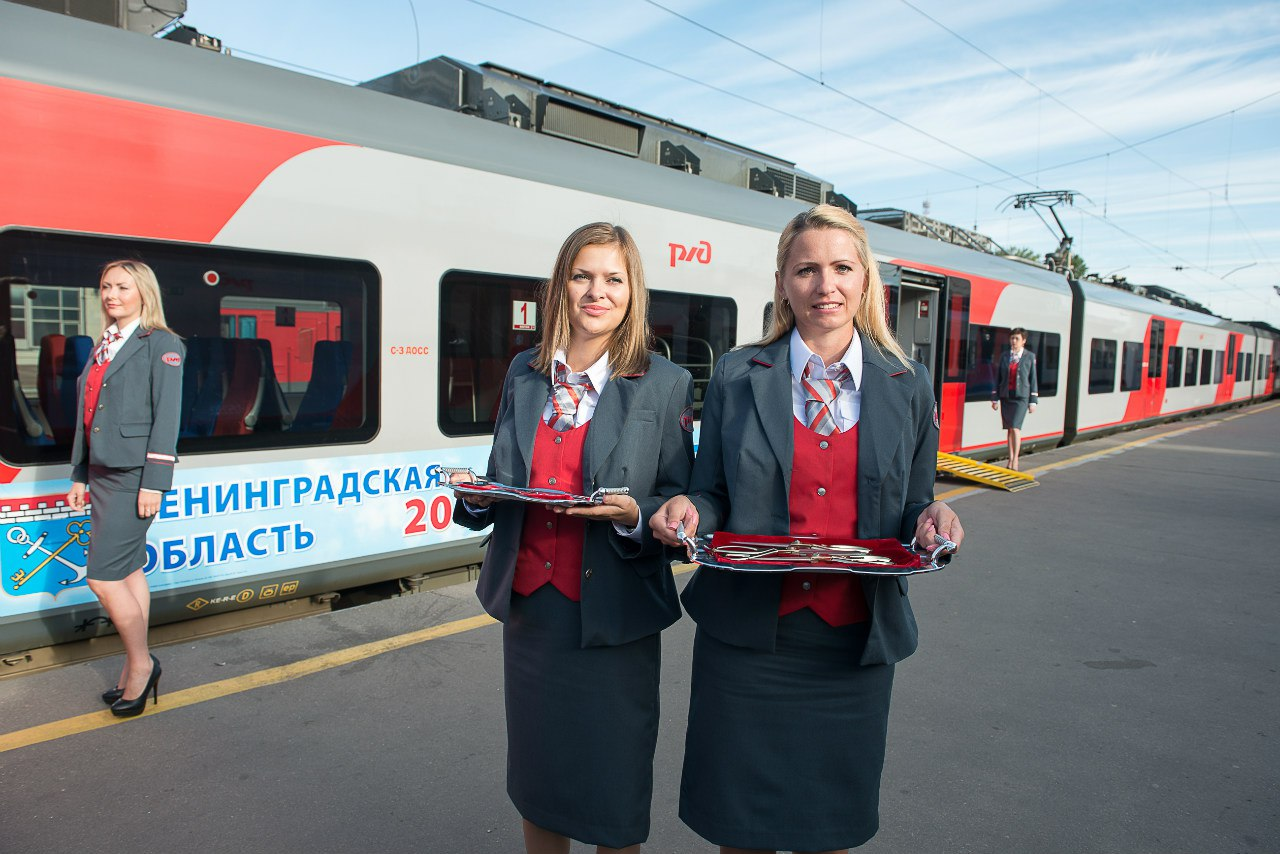
RZD staff at the launch of the Lastochka train on the Saint Petersburg-Vyborg route

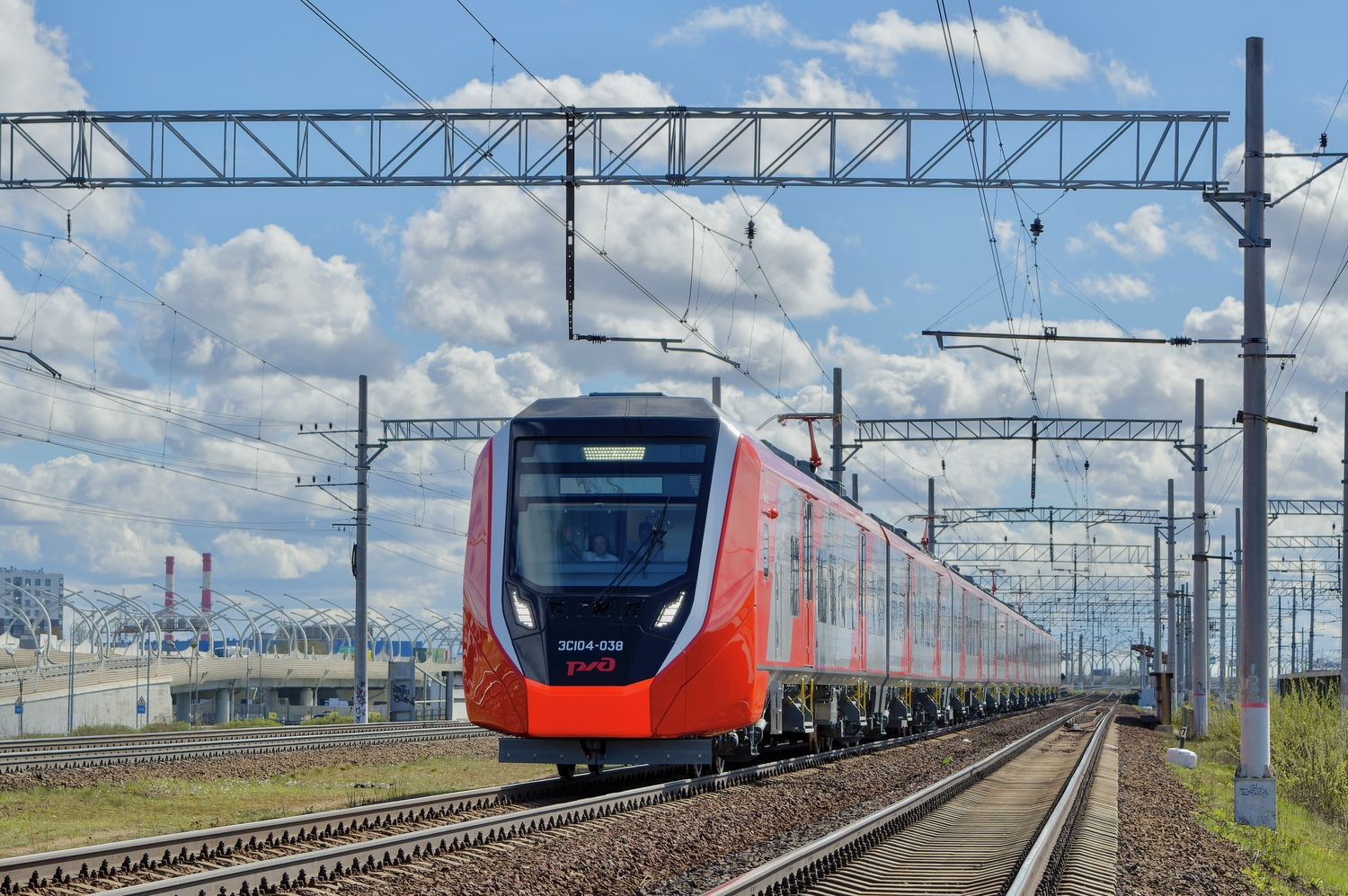
Finist suburban electric train, Saint Petersburg, 2025

Since 2009, the company is not a direct carrier of suburban passengers. Suburban transport is now operated by passenger companies founded by the executive agencies of the Russian Federation, Russian Railways and private investors. As of 2016, there are 25 suburban passenger companies (SPC), and Russian Railways owns a majority stake in 19 of them.

Especially for the SPC a zero tariff for the use of railway infrastructure was introduced. Russian Railways receives 25 billion rubles subsidies as compensation annually from the State. Commuter traffic in the whole network increased in 2011 on 5.6% and is about 878.33 million people. Passenger turnover rail in the Russian regions ranges from 5% to 30% in total passenger traffic.

=== Sponsorship ===
Since its establishment in 2003, Russian Railways sponsoring FC Lokomotiv Moscow in the Russian Premier League.

Since February 2016 Russian Railways is the sponsor of Rodina Kirov, a bandy team in the Russian Bandy Super League.

== Infrastructure ==
=== Branches ===
Российские железные дороги (РЖД) Russian Railways (RZD)

Overview
- Reporting mark: RZD, RZhD
- Locale: Russia
- Dates of operation: 2004–present

Technical
- Track gauge: 1,520 mm (4 ft 11 27/32 in); 1,435 mm (4 ft 8 1/2 in) (from Kaliningrad to Russian-Polish border)
- Electrification: 3 kV DC, 25 kV AC Main
- Length: 85,500 km (53,100 mi)

As of 31 December 2009, the total operational length of railway is 85 281 km, including the track gauge of 1,520 mm (4 ft 11 27/32 in) – 84,446 km, the length of continuous welded rails 74.4 thousand km, the railway network operated by 166,975 switches, 138 tunnels and 30,727 bridges.

The length of lines equipped with automatic block (AB) and centralized control, is 62,055 km, or 72.9%. Devices of railway automation and remote control on the Russian railway network served with 203 distance signaling, centralization and blocking and with one technical center of automation and remote control.

RZD has the following 16 railway branches:

No.	Branch	Branch name in Russian	Abbreviation	Network length	Managed from
1	October Railway	Октябрьская железная дорога	ОЖД	10,378 km	Saint Petersburg
2	Kaliningrad Railway	Калининградская железная дорога	КЖД	963 km	Kaliningrad
3	Moscow Railway	Московская железная дорога	МЖД	8,800 km	Moscow
4	Gorky Railway	Горьковская железная дорога	ГЖД	5,297 km	Nizhny Novgorod
5	Northern Railway	Северная железная дорога	СЖД	5,961 km	Yaroslavl
6	North Caucasus Railway	Северо-Кавказская железная дорога	СКЖД	6,311 km	Rostov-on-Don
7	South-Eastern Railway	Юго-Восточная железная дорога	ЮВЖД	4,189 km	Voronezh
8	Privolzhsk Railway	Приволжская железная дорога	ПривЖД	4,237 km	Saratov
9	Kuybyshev Railway	Куйбышевская железная дорога	КбшЖД	4,752 km	Samara
10	Sverdlovsk Railway	Свердловская железная дорога	СвЖД	7,154 km	Yekaterinburg
11	South Urals Railway	Южно-Уральская железная дорога	ЮУЖД	4,807 km	Chelyabinsk
12	West Siberian Railway	Западно-Сибирская железная дорога	З-СибЖД	5,558 km	Novosibirsk
13	Krasnoyarsk Railway	Красноярская железная дорога	КрасЖД	3,158 km	Krasnoyarsk
14	East Siberian Railway	Восточно-Сибирская железная дорога	В-СибЖД	3,876 km	Irkutsk
15	Zabaikal Railway	Забайкальская железная дорога	ЗабЖД	3,336 km	Chita
16	Far Eastern Railway	Дальневосточная железная дорога	ДВЖД	5,991 km	Khabarovsk

=== International operations ===
- Abkhazia - RZD had a 10-year management lease between 2009 and 2019 with Abkhazian railway.
- Armenia - RZD owns and operates South Caucasus Railway in Armenia.
- Mongolia - RZD also manages a 50% share in UBTZ on behalf of the Government of Russia.

=== Rolling stock ===
Russian Railways train showcase in 2015

Traction rolling stock includes diesel locomotives, electric locomotives, electric trains, diesel trains, railcars, railway handcar, other self-propelled equipment and non-tractive rolling stock – different cars (passenger, freight) and a special rolling stock.

The main producer of passenger cars (95%) is Tver Carriage Works.

At the end of 2012, the rolling stock inventory included 20,618 locomotives, including 2,543 electric passenger locomotives, 578 diesel passenger locomotives, 7,837 electric freight locomotives, 3,556 diesel freight locomotives, 6,104 shunting locomotives.

In 2017 RZD purchased 459 locomotives, including four EP1M, 13 EP2K, 19 TEP70 and four EP20 passenger units, as well as 84 2ES6, 10 2ES10, 51 2ES5K, 45 3ES5K, four 3ES4K, 86 2TE25 km, and five 4ES5K freight units.

In 2013, the RZD holding owned 252,900 freight cars, including 54,200 owned directly by Russian Railways, with the rest owned by company subsidiaries and affiliates, such as Federal Freight and TransContainer.

== Performance indicators ==
Annually JSC Russian Railways carries over 1 billion passengers and 1 billion tons of freight.

Kind of activity	Indicator	2005	2007	2008	2009
Freight traffic	Freight (trln tn. km).	1.85	2.31	2.4	2.27
Freight traffic	To last year	+3.1%		+5%	
Freight traffic	Freight (bln tn.).	1.40	1.34	1.30	1.11
Freight traffic	To last year	+4%			
Passenger traffic	Passenger turnover (trl pass. km)	118.9	174.1	176	153.6
Passenger traffic	To last year	+3.8%		+1%	
Passenger traffic	Passengers (mln pass.)		1352.8	1296	~1100
Passenger traffic	To last year		+2.5%		
	Attendants (ths people)	1127	1099		1075

In 2011, freight traffic of Russian Railways totaled about 1.4 billion tons. Passenger traffic for the year 2011 reached 992.4 million people.

Financial performance indicators under IFRS Russian Railways in 2005–2010
Indicators	2005	2006		2007		2008		2009		2010	
Income	749 bln rb.	▲	877.9 bln rb.	▲	1.016 trl rb.	▲	1.203 trl rb.	▼	1.126 trl rb.	▲	1.334 trl rb.
Operating cost			684.7 bln rb.	▲	821.5 bln rb.	▲	1.089 trl rb.	▼	1.013 bln rb.	▲	1.135 bln rb.
Operating income			194.7 bln rb.	▼	194.6 bln rb.	▼	113.9 bln rb.	▼	113.3 bln rb.	▲	198.9 bln rb.
EBITDA					267.5 bln rb.						
Net income	114 bln rb.	▲	139.8 bln rb.	▲	144.9 bln rb.	▼	76.4 bln rb.	▲	121.3 bln rb.	▲	208.3 bln rb.

The average salary on the network in October 2011 – 31 thousand rubles a month. Loading volume for the year 2012 amounted to 1 billion 274.7 million tons (+2.7% compared to 2011), the share in the total turnover of the country (except pipelines) — 85.5%. In 2012, the network carried 1 bln 56.7 million passengers (+6.4% compared to 2011). Net income from the basic activities using Russian GAAP was in 2012 almost 5.3 billion rubles, which is a decrease compared to 2011 (13.7 billion rubles) of almost 3 times. The company's revenue in 2021 amounted to 2 trillion rubles.

In total, Russian Railways receives 112 billion roubles (around US$1.5 billion) annually from the government.

In November 2025, it was reported that Russian Railways is 4 trillion roubles ($50.8B) in debt.

== Employees ==
	Rank insignia of employees of the open joint-stock company "Russian Railways"					
Rank insignia						
Category of positions	Director General	Outside category	Highest category	Senior category	Middle category	Junior category

== See also ==
- Russian Railway Museum, in Saint Petersburg
- Emperor railway station in Pushkin town
