= May 16 =

May 16 this year in various calendars
- Saturday, 16 May 2026
Akan	Monomemene
Armenian	30 Mareri 1475
Aztec	Ochpaniztli 6, 10 Ocēlōtl
Babylonian	28 Nisanu, 2337 SE
Balinese pawukon	Menga, Kajeng, Laba, Pon, Maulu, Saniscara of Gumbreg, Indra, Gigis, Manusa
Bengali	2 Joishtho, BS 1433
Chinese	Yang Metal Tiger・Stomach Mansion; Fire Horse Year, Month 3, Day 30 (Lixia, 5 days until Xiaoman)
Common Era	16 May 2026 CE
Coptic	8 Pashons, AM 1742
Egyptian	30 Thoth, 2775 NE
Ethiopian	8 Genbot, 2018 Amätä Məhrät
French Republican	Décade III, Septidi de Floréal de l'Année 234 de la République
Gregorian	16 May, AD 2026
Hebrew	29 Iyar, AM 5786; Omer 44
Hindu	Bharaṇī・Saubhāgya; Solar: 2 Jyeṣṭha, 1948 SE; Lunisolar: Amāvasyā, Kṛishna pakṣa of Vaiśākha, 2083 VE; Rāudra・5127 KY・1,872,711
Icelandic	Laugardagur, 24 Harpa 2026
Islamic	29 Dhu al-Qi'dah, AH 1447 (using tabular method)
ISO week date	2026-W20-6
Japanese	30 Yayoi, Reiwa 8 (Rikka, 5 days until Shōman)
Julian	3 May, AD 2026 (AM 7534)
Julian day	2461177
Korean	30 Yongdal, 4359 DE
Maya	13.0.13.10.14; 7 Zip, 10 Ix
Roman	ante diem V Nonas Maias, MMDCCLXXIX AUC
Solar Hijri	26 Ordibehesht, SH 1405
Tibetan	30 nag pa, me pho rta 2153 or 1772 or 1000

<<	May					>>
Su	Mo	Tu	We	Th	Fr	Sa
					1	2
3	4	5	6	7	8	9
10	11	12	13	14	15	16
17	18	19	20	21	22	23
24	25	26	27	28	29	30
31
2026

May 16 in recent years
2026 (Saturday)
2025 (Friday)
2024 (Thursday)
2023 (Tuesday)
2022 (Monday)
2021 (Sunday)
2020 (Saturday)
2019 (Thursday)
2018 (Wednesday)
2017 (Tuesday)

May 16 is the 136th day of the year (137th in leap years) in the Gregorian calendar; 229 days remain until the end of the year.

== Events ==
=== Pre-1600 ===
- 946 – Emperor Suzaku abdicates the throne in favor of his brother Murakami who becomes the 62nd emperor of Japan.
- 999 – Rebel Turkish warlord Mahmud of Ghazni defeats Samanid Emir Mansur II in battle at Merv.
- 1003 – Patrician John II Crescentius, who has seized control of Rome, selects Pope John XVII as the new pope.
- 1204 – Baldwin IX, Count of Flanders is crowned as the first Emperor of the Latin Empire.
- 1364 – Hundred Years' War: Bertrand du Guesclin and a French army defeat the Anglo-Navarrese army of Charles the Bad at Cocherel.
- 1426 – Gov. Thado of Mohnyin becomes King of Ava.
- 1527 – The Florentines drive out the Medici for a second time and Florence re-establishes itself as a republic.
- 1532 – Sir Thomas More resigns as Lord Chancellor of England.
- 1568 – Mary, Queen of Scots, flees to England.
- 1584 – Santiago de Vera becomes sixth governor-general of the Spanish colony of the Philippines.

=== 1601–1900 ===
- 1739 – The Battle of Vasai concludes as the Marathas defeat the Portuguese army.
- 1770 – The 14-year-old Marie Antoinette marries 15-year-old Louis-Auguste, Dauphin de France, who later becomes king of France.
- 1771 – The Battle of Alamance, a pre-American Revolutionary War battle between local militia and a group of rebels called The "Regulators", occurs in present-day Alamance County, North Carolina.
- 1777 – Continental Army officer Lachlan McIntosh fatally wounds Button Gwinnett, a signer of the United States Declaration of Independence, in a duel in Savannah, Georgia.
- 1811 – Peninsular War: The allies Spain, Portugal and United Kingdom fight an inconclusive battle against the French at the Albuera. It is, in proportion to the numbers involved, the bloodiest battle of the war.
- 1812 – Imperial Russia signs the Treaty of Bucharest, ending the Russo-Turkish War. The Ottoman Empire cedes Bessarabia to Russia.
- 1822 – Greek War of Independence: The Turks capture the Greek town of Souli.
- 1832 – Juan Godoy discovers the rich silver outcrops of Chañarcillo sparking the Chilean silver rush.
- 1834 – The Battle of Asseiceira is fought; it was the final and decisive engagement of the Liberal Wars in Portugal.
- 1842 – The first major wagon train heading for the Pacific Northwest sets out on the Oregon Trail from Elm Grove, Missouri, with 100 pioneers.
- 1863 – American Civil War: During the Vicksburg campaign, the decisive Union victory by Ulysses S. Grant at the Battle of Champion Hill drives the Confederate army under John C. Pemberton back towards Vicksburg, Mississippi.
- 1866 – The United States Congress establishes the nickel.
- 1868 – The United States Senate fails to convict President Andrew Johnson by one vote.
- 1874 – A flood on the Mill River in Massachusetts destroys much of four villages and kills 139 people.
- 1877 – The 16 May 1877 crisis occurs in France, ending with the dissolution of the National Assembly 22 June and affirming the interpretation of the Constitution of 1875 as a parliamentary rather than presidential system. The elections held in October 1877 led to the defeat of the royalists as a formal political movement in France.
- 1888 – Nikola Tesla delivers a lecture describing the equipment which will allow efficient generation and use of alternating currents to transmit electric power over long distances.
- 1891 – The International Electrotechnical Exhibition opens in Frankfurt, Germany, featuring the world's first long-distance transmission of high-power, three-phase electric current (the most common form today).

=== 1901–present ===
- 1916 – The United Kingdom of Great Britain and Ireland and the French Third Republic sign the secret wartime Sykes-Picot Agreement partitioning former Ottoman territories such as Iraq and Syria.
- 1918 – The Sedition Act of 1918 is passed by the U.S. Congress, making criticism of the government during wartime an imprisonable offense. It will be repealed less than two years later.
- 1918 – The victory military parade by the Finnish White Guard is held in Helsinki celebrating their decisive victory in the Finnish Civil War. The day also begin to be celebrated on the Defence Forces Flag Day before it is moved in 1942 to the June 4th.
- 1919 – A naval Curtiss NC-4 aircraft commanded by Albert Cushing Read leaves Trepassey, Newfoundland, for Lisbon via the Azores on the first transatlantic flight.
- 1920 – In Rome, Pope Benedict XV canonizes Joan of Arc.
- 1925 – The first modern performance of Claudio Monteverdi's opera Il ritorno d'Ulisse in patria occurred in Paris.
- 1929 – In Hollywood, the first Academy Awards ceremony takes place.
- 1943 – The Holocaust: The Warsaw Ghetto Uprising ends.
- 1943 – Operation Chastise is undertaken by RAF Bomber Command with specially equipped Avro Lancasters to destroy the Mohne, Sorpe, and Eder dams in the Ruhr valley.
- 1945 – Beginning of the Levant Crisis between Britain and France in Syria. The latter try to quell nationalist protests but backs down after threat of military action by the British.
- 1951 – The first regularly scheduled transatlantic flights begin between Idlewild Airport (now John F Kennedy International Airport) in New York City and Heathrow Airport in London, operated by El Al Israel Airlines.
- 1954 – Beginning of the Kengir uprising in the Gulag.
- 1959 – The Tritons' Fountain in Valletta, Malta is turned on for the first time.
- 1960 – Theodore Maiman operates the first optical laser (a ruby laser), at Hughes Research Laboratories in Malibu, California.
- 1961 – Park Chung Hee leads a coup d'état to overthrow the Second Republic of South Korea.
- 1966 – The Chinese Communist Party issues the "May 16 Notice", marking the beginning of the Cultural Revolution.
- 1969 – Venera program: Venera 5, a Soviet space probe, lands on Venus.
- 1972 – An Antonov An-24 crashes into a kindergarten building in Svetlogorsk, killing 35.
- 1974 – Josip Broz Tito is elected president for life of Yugoslavia.
- 1975 – Junko Tabei from Japan becomes the first woman to reach the summit of Mount Everest.
- 1988 – A report by the Surgeon General of the United States C. Everett Koop states that the addictive properties of nicotine are similar to those of heroin and cocaine.
- 1991 – Queen Elizabeth II of the United Kingdom addresses a joint session of the United States Congress. She is the first British monarch to address the U.S. Congress.
- 1997 – Mobutu Sese Seko, the President of Zaire, flees the country.
- 2003 – In Morocco, 33 civilians are killed and more than 100 people are injured in the Casablanca terrorist attacks.
- 2005 – Kuwait permits women's suffrage in a 35–23 National Assembly vote.
- 2011 – STS-134 (ISS assembly flight ULF6), launched from the Kennedy Space Center on the 25th and final flight for Space Shuttle Endeavour.
- 2014 – Twelve people are killed in two explosions in the Gikomba market area of Nairobi, Kenya.
- 2025 – A catastrophic EF3 tornado kills five people and causes over $1 billion in damages in St. Louis, MO.
- 2025 – A devastating EF4 tornado kills nineteen people in Southeast Kentucky, hitting the towns of Somerset and London.

== Births ==
=== Pre-1600 ===
- 1418 – John II of Cyprus, King of Cyprus and Armenia and also titular King of Jerusalem from 1432 to 1458 (probable; (died 1458)
- 1455 – Wolfgang I of Oettingen, German count (died 1522)
- 1542 – Anna Sibylle of Hanau-Lichtenberg, German noblewoman (died 1580)

=== 1601–1900 ===
- 1606 – John Bulwer, British doctor (died 1656)
- 1611 – Pope Innocent XI (died 1689)
- 1641 – Dudley North, English economist and politician (died 1691)
- 1710 – William Talbot, 1st Earl Talbot, English politician, Lord Steward of the Household (died 1782)
- 1718 – Maria Gaetana Agnesi, Italian mathematician and philosopher (died 1799)
- 1763 – Louis Nicolas Vauquelin, French pharmacist and chemist (died 1829)
- 1788 – Friedrich Rückert, German poet and translator (died 1866)
- 1801 – William H. Seward, American lawyer and politician, 24th United States Secretary of State (died 1872)
- 1804 – Elizabeth Palmer Peabody, American educator who founded the first U.S. kindergarten (died 1894)
- 1819 – Johann Voldemar Jannsen, Estonian journalist and poet (died 1890)
- 1821 – Pafnuty Chebyshev, Russian mathematician and statistician (died 1894)
- 1824 – Levi P. Morton, American banker and politician, 22nd United States Vice President (died 1920)
- 1824 – Edmund Kirby Smith, American general (died 1893)
- 1827 – Pierre Cuypers, Dutch architect, designed the Amsterdam Centraal railway station and Rijksmuseum (died 1921)
- 1831 – David Edward Hughes, Welsh-American physicist, co-invented the microphone (died 1900)
- 1859 – Horace Hutchinson, English golfer (died 1932)
- 1862 – Margaret Fountaine, English lepidopterist and diarist (died 1940)
- 1876 – Fred Conrad Koch, American biochemist and endocrinologist (died 1948)
- 1879 – Pierre Gilliard, Swiss author and academic (died 1962)
- 1882 – Simeon Price, American golfer (died 1945)
- 1883 – Celâl Bayar, Turkish politician, 3rd President of Turkey (died 1986)
- 1887 – Maria Lacerda de Moura, Brazilian teacher and anarcha-feminist (died 1945)
- 1888 – Royal Rife, American microbiologist and instrument maker (died 1971)
- 1890 – Edith Grace White, American ichthyologist (died 1975)
- 1892 – Osgood Perkins (actor, born 1892), American actor (died 1937)
- 1894 – Walter Yust, American journalist and writer (died 1960)
- 1897 – Zvi Sliternik, Israeli entomologist and academic (died 1993)
- 1898 – Tamara de Lempicka, Polish-American painter (died 1980)
- 1898 – Desanka Maksimović, Serbian poet and academic (died 1993)
- 1898 – Kenji Mizoguchi, Japanese director and screenwriter (died 1956)

=== 1901–present ===
- 1903 – Charles F. Brannock, American inventor and manufacturer (died 1992)
- 1905 – Henry Fonda, American actor (died 1982)
- 1905 – H.E. Bates, British writer (died 1974)
- 1906 – Ernie McCormick, Australian cricketer (died 1991)
- 1906 – Alfred Pellan, Canadian painter and educator (died 1988)
- 1906 – Arturo Uslar Pietri, Venezuelan lawyer, journalist, and author (died 2001)
- 1906 – Margret Rey, German author and illustrator (died 1996)
- 1907 – Bob Tisdall, Irish hurdler (died 2004)
- 1909 – Margaret Sullavan, American actress and singer (died 1960)
- 1909 – Luigi Villoresi, Italian race car driver (died 1997)
- 1910 – Olga Bergholz, Russian poet and author (died 1975)
- 1910 – Higashifushimi Kunihide, Japanese monk and educator (died 2014)
- 1912 – Studs Terkel, American historian and author (died 2008)
- 1913 – Gordon Chalk, Australian politician, 30th Premier of Queensland (died 1991)
- 1913 – Woody Herman, American singer, saxophonist, and clarinet player (died 1987)
- 1914 – Edward T. Hall, American anthropologist and author (died 2009)
- 1915 – Mario Monicelli, Italian director and screenwriter (died 2010)
- 1916 – Ephraim Katzir, Israeli biophysicist and politician, 4th President of Israel (died 2009)
- 1917 – Ben Kuroki, American sergeant and pilot (died 2015)
- 1917 – James C. Murray, American lawyer and politician (died 1999)
- 1917 – Juan Rulfo, Mexican author and photographer (died 1986)
- 1918 – Wilf Mannion, English footballer and manager (died 2000)
- 1919 – Liberace, American pianist and entertainer (died 1987)
- 1919 – Ramon Margalef, Spanish ecologist and biologist (died 2004)
- 1920 – Martine Carol, French actress (died 1967)
- 1921 – Harry Carey Jr., American actor, producer, and screenwriter (died 2012)
- 1923 – Victoria Fromkin, American linguist and academic (died 2000)
- 1923 – Merton Miller, American economist and academic, Nobel Prize laureate (died 2000)
- 1923 – Peter Underwood, English parapsychologist and author (died 2014)
- 1924 – Barbara Bachmann, American microbiologist (died 1999)
- 1924 – Dawda Jawara, 1st President of the Gambia (died 2019)
- 1925 – Nancy Roman, American astronomer (died 2018)
- 1925 – Ola Vincent, Nigerian banker and economist (died 2012)
- 1925 – Nílton Santos, Brazilian footballer (died 2013)
- 1926 – Glen Michael, British television presenter and entertainer (died 2025)
- 1926 – Robert Jay Lifton, American psychiatrist and author (died 2025)
- 1928 – Billy Martin, American baseball player and coach (died 1989)
- 1929 – Betty Carter, American singer-songwriter (died 1998)
- 1929 – John Conyers, American lawyer and politician (died 2019)
- 1929 – Claude Morin, Canadian academic and politician (died 2026)
- 1929 – Adrienne Rich, American poet, essayist, and feminist (died 2012)
- 1929 – K. Natwar Singh, Indian scholar and politician, Indian Minister of External Affairs (died 2024)
- 1930 – Friedrich Gulda, Austrian pianist and composer (died 2000)
- 1931 – Vujadin Boškov, Serbian footballer, coach, and manager (died 2014)
- 1931 – Hana Brady, Jewish-Czech Holocaust victim (died 1944)
- 1931 – Lowell P. Weicker Jr., American soldier and politician, 85th Governor of Connecticut (died 2023)
- 1934 – Kenneth O. Morgan, Welsh historian and author
- 1934 – Antony Walker, English general (died 2023)
- 1935 – Floyd Smith, Canadian ice hockey player and coach
- 1936 – Karl Lehmann, German cardinal (died 2018)
- 1937 – Yvonne Craig, American ballet dancer and actress (died 2015)
- 1937 – Jim Hunt, American politician, 69th and 71st Governor of North Carolina (died 2025)
- 1938 – Stuart Bell, English lawyer and politician (died 2012)
- 1938 – Ivan Sutherland, American computer scientist and academic
- 1938 – Marco Aurelio Denegri, Peruvian television host and sexologist (died 2018)
- 1939 – Mario Segni, Italian professor and politician
- 1941 – Denis Hart, Australian archbishop
- 1942 – David Penry-Davey, English lawyer and judge (died 2015)
- 1943 – Kay Andrews, Baroness Andrews, English politician
- 1943 – Dan Coats, American politician and diplomat, 29th United States Ambassador to Germany
- 1943 – Wieteke van Dort, Dutch actress, comedian, singer, writer and artist (died 2024)
- 1944 – Billy Cobham, Panamanian-American drummer, composer, and bandleader
- 1944 – Antal Nagy, Hungarian footballer
- 1944 – Friedrich Schorlemmer, German Protestant theologian (died 2024)
- 1944 – Danny Trejo, American actor
- 1946 – John Law, English sociologist and academic
- 1946 – Robert Fripp, English guitarist, songwriter and producer
- 1947 – Cheryl Clarke, American writer
- 1947 – Darrell Sweet, Scottish drummer (died 1999)
- 1947 – Roch Thériault, Canadian religious leader (died 2011)
- 1948 – Jesper Christensen, Danish actor, director, and producer
- 1948 – Judy Finnigan, English talk show host and author
- 1948 – Enrico Fumia, Italian automobile and product designer
- 1948 – Jimmy Hood, Scottish engineer and politician (died 2017)
- 1948 – Emma Georgina Rothschild, English historian and academic
- 1948 – Staf Van Roosbroeck, Belgian cyclist
- 1949 – Rick Reuschel, American baseball player
- 1950 – Georg Bednorz, German physicist and academic, Nobel Prize laureate
- 1950 – Ray Condo, Canadian singer-songwriter and guitarist (died 2004)
- 1950 – Bruce Coville, American author
- 1951 – Christian Lacroix, French fashion designer
- 1951 – Jonathan Richman, American singer-songwriter and guitarist
- 1951 – Janet Soskice, Canadian philosopher and theologian
- 1953 – Pierce Brosnan, Irish-American actor and producer
- 1953 – Peter Onorati, American actor
- 1953 – Richard Page, American singer-songwriter and bass player
- 1953 – Kitanoumi Toshimitsu, Japanese sumo wrestler, the 55th Yokozuna (died 2015)
- 1953 – David Maclean, Scottish politician
- 1953 – Stephen Woolman, Lord Woolman, Scottish judge and academic
- 1954 – Dafydd Williams, Canadian physician and astronaut
- 1955 – Olga Korbut, Soviet gymnast
- 1955 – Jack Morris, American baseball player and sportscaster
- 1955 – Hazel O'Connor, English-born Irish singer-songwriter and actress
- 1955 – Páidí Ó Sé, Irish footballer and manager (died 2012)
- 1955 – Debra Winger, American actress
- 1956 – Loretta Schrijver, Dutch television host, news anchor (died 2025)
- 1957 – Joan Benoit, American runner
- 1957 – Benjamin Mancroft, 3rd Baron Mancroft, English politician
- 1957 – Yuri Shevchuk, Russian singer-songwriter and guitarist
- 1957 – Anthony St John, 22nd Baron St John of Bletso, English lawyer and businessman
- 1957 – Bob Suter, American ice hockey player and coach (died 2014)
- 1959 – Mitch Webster, American baseball player
- 1959 – Mare Winningham, American actress and singer-songwriter
- 1960 – Landon Deireragea, Nauruan politician, Nauruan Speaker of Parliament
- 1960 – Bruce Norris, American actor and playwright
- 1960 – S. Shanmuganathan, Sri Lankan commander and politician (died 1998)
- 1961 – Kevin McDonald, Canadian actor and screenwriter
- 1961 – Charles Wright, American wrestler
- 1962 – Helga Radtke, German long jumper
- 1963 – Rachel Griffith, Anglo-American economist
- 1963 – David Wilkinson, English theologian and academic
- 1964 – John Salley, American basketball player and actor
- 1964 – Boyd Tinsley, American singer-songwriter and violinist
- 1964 – Milton Jones, English comedian, actor, and screenwriter
- 1965 – Krist Novoselic, American bass player, songwriter, author, and activist
- 1965 – Tanel Tammet, Estonian computer scientist, engineer, and academic
- 1966 – Janet Jackson, American singer-songwriter and actress
- 1966 – Scott Reeves, American singer-songwriter and actor
- 1966 – Thurman Thomas, American football player
- 1967 – Doug Brocail, American baseball player and coach
- 1967 – Susan Williams, Baroness Williams of Trafford, British politician
- 1968 – Ralph Tresvant, American singer and producer
- 1969 – David Boreanaz, American actor
- 1969 – Tucker Carlson, American journalist, co-founded The Daily Caller
- 1969 – Steve Lewis, American sprinter
- 1970 – Gabriela Sabatini, Argentinian tennis player
- 1970 – Danielle Spencer, Australian singer-songwriter and actress
- 1971 – Phil Clarke, English rugby league player and sportscaster
- 1971 – Rachel Goswell, English singer-songwriter and guitarist
- 1972 – Christian Califano, French rugby player
- 1972 – Matthew Hart, New Zealand cricketer
- 1973 – Tori Spelling, American actress, reality television personality, and author
- 1974 – Laura Pausini, Italian singer-songwriter and producer
- 1974 – Sonny Sandoval, American singer-songwriter and rapper
- 1975 – Tony Kakko, Finnish musician, composer, and vocalist
- 1975 – Simon Whitfield, Canadian triathlete
- 1976 – Dirk Nannes, Australian-Dutch cricketer
- 1977 – Melanie Lynskey, New Zealand actress
- 1977 – Emilíana Torrini, Icelandic singer-songwriter
- 1978 – Scott Nicholls, English motorcycle racer
- 1978 – Lionel Scaloni, Argentinian footballer and manager
- 1979 – Michael Oberlechner, Austrian politician
- 1980 – Nuria Llagostera Vives, Spanish tennis player
- 1981 – Ricardo Costa, Portuguese footballer
- 1982 – Melissa Altro, Canadian actress
- 1982 – Łukasz Kubot, Polish tennis player
- 1983 – Daniel Kerr, Australian footballer
- 1983 – Kyle Wellwood, Canadian ice hockey player
- 1984 – Darío Cvitanich, Argentinian footballer
- 1984 – Tomáš Fleischmann, Czech ice hockey player
- 1984 – Jensen Lewis, American baseball player
- 1984 – Rick Rypien, Canadian ice hockey player (died 2011)
- 1985 – Anja Mittag, German footballer
- 1985 – Rodrigo Peters Marques, Brazilian footballer
- 1985 – Corey Perry, Canadian ice hockey player
- 1986 – Megan Fox, American actress
- 1986 – Andy Keogh, Irish footballer
- 1986 – Shamcey Supsup, Filipino model and architect
- 1987 – Tom Onslow-Cole, English race car driver
- 1988 – Jesús Castillo, Mexican footballer
- 1988 – Martynas Gecevičius, Lithuanian basketball player
- 1988 – Jaak Põldma, Estonian tennis player
- 1989 – Behati Prinsloo, Namibian model
- 1990 – Amanda Carreras, Gibraltarian tennis player
- 1990 – Thomas Brodie-Sangster, English actor
- 1990 – Darko Šarović, Serbian sprinter
- 1990 – Omar Strong, American basketball player
- 1991 – Grigor Dimitrov, Bulgarian tennis player
- 1991 – Joey Graceffa, American internet celebrity
- 1991 – Ashley Wagner, American figure skater
- 1992 – Jeff Skinner, Canadian ice hockey player
- 1992 – Kirstin Maldonado, American singer and songwriter
- 1993 – Johannes Thingnes Bø, Norwegian biathlete
- 1993 – Karol Mets, Estonian footballer
- 1993 – IU, Korean singer-songwriter and actress
- 1994 – Kathinka von Deichmann, Liechtenstein tennis player
- 1995 – Elizabeth Ralston, Australian footballer
- 1996 – Louisa Chirico, American tennis player
- 2000 – Luis García Jr., Dominican-American baseball player
- 2002 – Ryan Gravenberch, Dutch footballer

== Deaths ==
=== Pre-1600 ===
- 290 – Emperor Wu of Jin, Chinese emperor (born 236)
- 895 – Qian Kuan, Chinese nobleman
- 934 – Meng Hanqiong, eunuch official of Later Tang
- 995 – Fujiwara no Michitaka, Japanese nobleman (born 953)
- 1115 – Lambert of Arras, Flemish bishop
- 1182 – John Komnenos Vatatzes, Byzantine general (born 1132)
- 1265 – Simon Stock, English-French saint (born 1165)
- 1375 – Liu Bowen, Chinese military strategist, officer, statesman and poet (born 1311)
- 1412 – Gian Maria Visconti, Duke of Milan (born 1388)
- 1561 – Jan Tarnowski, Polish noble and statesman (born 1488)

=== 1601–1900 ===
- 1620 – William Adams, English sailor and navigator (born 1564)
- 1657 – Andrew Bobola, Polish missionary and martyr (born 1591)
- 1667 – Thomas Wriothesley, 4th Earl of Southampton, English politician, Lord High Treasurer (born 1607)
- 1669 – Pietro da Cortona, Italian painter and architect, designed the Santi Luca e Martina (born 1596)
- 1691 – Jacob Leisler, German-American politician, 8th Colonial Governor of New York (born 1640)
- 1696 – Mariana of Austria, Queen consort of Spain (born 1634)
- 1703 – Charles Perrault, French author and academic (born 1628)
- 1778 – Robert Darcy, 4th Earl of Holderness, English politician, Secretary of State for the Southern Department (born 1718)
- 1790 – Philip Yorke, 2nd Earl of Hardwicke, English politician, Lord Lieutenant of Cambridgeshire (born 1720)
- 1818 – Matthew Lewis, English author and playwright (born 1775)
- 1823 – Grace Elliott, Scottish courtesan and spy (born c. 1754)
- 1830 – Joseph Fourier, French mathematician and physicist (born 1768)
- 1861 – John Stevens Henslow, British priest, geologist and doctoral advisor to Charles Darwin (born 1796)
- 1862 – Edward Gibbon Wakefield, English politician (born 1796)
- 1882 – Reuben Chapman, American lawyer and politician, 13th Governor of Alabama (born 1799)
- 1890 – Mihkel Veske, Estonian poet, linguist and theologist (born 1843)
- 1891 – Ion C. Brătianu, Romanian politician, 14th Prime Minister of Romania (born 1821)

=== 1901–present ===
- 1910 – Henri-Edmond Cross, French Neo-Impressionist painter (born 1856)
- 1913 – Louis Perrier, Swiss architect and politician (born 1849)
- 1920 – Levi P. Morton, American politician, 22nd United States Vice President (born 1824)
- 1926 – Mehmed VI, the 36th and last Sultan of the Ottoman Empire (born 1861)
- 1936 – Leonidas Paraskevopoulos, Greek general and politician (born 1860)
- 1938 – Joseph Strauss, American engineer, co designed The Golden Gate Bridge (born 1870)
- 1943 – Alfred Hoche, German psychiatrist and academic (born 1865)
- 1943 – Nigger, black labrador retriever belonging to Wing Commander Guy Gibson of the Royal Air Force, and the mascot of No. 617 Squadron.
- 1944 – George Ade, American journalist, author, and playwright (born 1866)
- 1944 – Filip Mișea, Aromanian activist, physician and politician (born 1873)
- 1946 – Bruno Tesch, German chemist and businessman (born 1890)
- 1947 – Frederick Gowland Hopkins, English biochemist and academic, Nobel Prize laureate (born 1861)
- 1947 – Kalle Hakala, Finnish politician (born 1880)
- 1947 – Zhang Lingfu, Chinese general (born 1903)
- 1953 – Django Reinhardt, Belgian guitarist and composer (born 1910)
- 1954 – Clemens Krauss, Austrian conductor and manager (born 1893)
- 1955 – James Agee, American novelist, screenwriter, and critic(born 1909)
- 1955 – Manny Ayulo, American race car driver (born 1921)
- 1956 – H. B. Reese, American candy-maker and businessman, created Reese's Peanut Butter Cups (born 1876)
- 1957 – Eliot Ness, American federal agent (born 1903)
- 1961 – George A. Malcolm, American lawyer and jurist (born 1881)
- 1977 – Modibo Keïta, Malian politician, 1st President of Mali (born 1915)
- 1979 – A. Philip Randolph, American union leader and activist (born 1889)
- 1981 – Ernie Freeman, American pianist, composer, and bandleader (born 1922)
- 1981 – Willy Hartner, German physician and academic (born 1905)
- 1984 – Andy Kaufman, American actor, comedian, and screenwriter (born 1949)
- 1984 – Irwin Shaw, American playwright, screenwriter, novelist, and short story writer (born 1913)
- 1985 – Margaret Hamilton, American actress (born 1902)
- 1989 – Leila Kasra, Iranian poet and songwriter (born 1939)
- 1990 – Sammy Davis Jr., American singer, dancer, and actor (born 1925)
- 1990 – Jim Henson, American puppeteer, director, producer, and screenwriter, creator of The Muppets (born 1936)
- 1993 – Marv Johnson, American singer-songwriter and pianist (born 1938)
- 1994 – Alain Cuny, French actor (born 1908)
- 1996 – Jeremy Michael Boorda, American admiral (born 1939)
- 1997 – Elbridge Durbrow, American diplomat (born 1903)
- 2002 – Alec Campbell, Australian soldier (born 1899)
- 2003 – Mark McCormack, American lawyer and sports agent, founded IMG (born 1930)
- 2005 – Andrew Goodpaster, American general (born 1915)
- 2008 – Robert Mondavi, American winemaker, co-founded the Opus One Winery (born 1913)
- 2010 – Ronnie James Dio, American singer-songwriter and producer (born 1942)
- 2010 – Hank Jones, American pianist, composer, and bandleader (born 1918)
- 2011 – Ralph Barker, English author (born 1917)
- 2011 – Bob Davis, Australian footballer and coach (born 1928)
- 2011 – Edward Hardwicke, English actor (born 1932)
- 2011 – Kiyoshi Kodama, Japanese actor (born 1934)
- 2012 – Patricia Aakhus, American author and academic (born 1952)
- 2012 – James Abdnor, American soldier and politician (born 1923)
- 2012 – Chuck Brown, American singer-songwriter, guitarist, and producer (born 1936)
- 2012 – Ernie Chan, Filipino-American illustrator (born 1940)
- 2012 – Kevin Hickey, American baseball player (born 1956)
- 2013 – Angelo Errichetti, American politician (born 1928)
- 2013 – Bryan Illerbrun, Canadian football player (born 1957)
- 2013 – Frankie Librán, Puerto Rican-American baseball player (born 1948)
- 2013 – Heinrich Rohrer, Swiss physicist and academic, Nobel Prize laureate (born 1933)
- 2013 – Paul Shane, British actor and comedian (born 1940)
- 2013 – Dick Trickle, American race car driver (born 1941)
- 2013 – Bernard Waber, American author and illustrator (born 1921)
- 2014 – Chris Duckworth, Zimbabwean-South African cricketer (born 1933)
- 2014 – Vito Favero, Italian cyclist (born 1932)
- 2014 – Bud Hollowell, American baseball player and manager (born 1943)
- 2014 – Clyde Snow, American anthropologist and author (born 1928)
- 2015 – Prashant Bhargava, American director and producer (born 1973)
- 2015 – Moshe Levinger, Israeli rabbi and author (born 1935)
- 2015 – Flora MacNeil, Scottish Gaelic singer (born 1928)
- 2019 – Piet Blauw, Dutch politician (born 1937)
- 2019 – Bob Hawke, Australian politician, 23rd Prime Minister of Australia (born 1929)
- 2019 – I. M. Pei, Chinese-American architect (born 1917)
- 2021 – Bruno Covas, Brazilian lawyer, politician (born 1980)
- 2023 – Norm Green, American long-distance runner (born 1932)
- 2024 – Dabney Coleman, American actor (born 1932)
- 2024 – Eddie Gossage, American public speaker and businessman (born 1958)
- 2025 – Domingos Maubere, East Timorese Catholic priest and activist (born 1952)

== Holidays and observances ==
- Christian feast day:
  - Aaron (Coptic Church)
  - Abda and Abdjesus, and companions:
    - Abdas of Susa
  - Andrew Bobola
  - Brendan the Navigator (Roman Catholic Church, Anglican Communion, Eastern Orthodox Church)
  - Caroline Chisholm (Church of England)
  - Gemma Galgani (Passionists Calendar)
  - Germerius
  - Honoratus of Amiens
  - Peregrine of Auxerre
  - Possidius
  - Simon Stock
  - Ubald (see Saint Ubaldo Day)
  - May 16 (Eastern Orthodox liturgics)
- Martyrs of Sudan (Episcopal Church (USA))
- Mass Graves Day (Iraq)
- National Day, declared by Salva Kiir (South Sudan)
- Teachers' Day (Malaysia)
