= Water Tower, Svetlogorsk =

Coordinates: 54.9434°N 20.1546°E

Water Tower
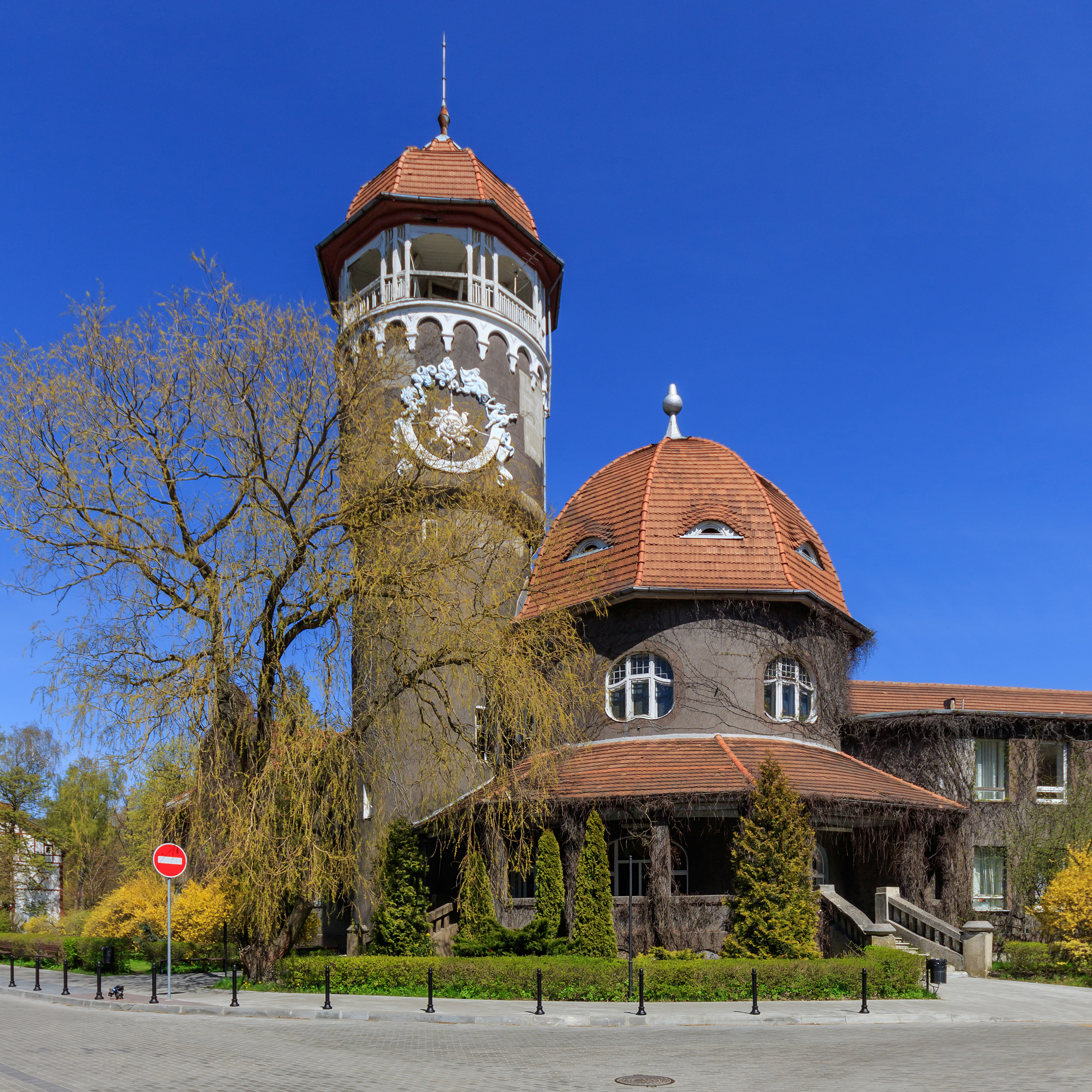
- The Water Power Tower in Svetlogorsk

General information
- Location: Svetlogorsk, Kaliningrad Oblast, Russia
- Height: 25 metres (82 ft)

The Water Tower (Russian: Водононапорная башня, romanized: Vodonapornaya Bashnya; German: Wasserturm) is the focal point of Svetlogorsk, Kaliningrad Oblast, Russia. The tower is one of the most prominent symbols of the city.

== History ==
The Water tower and the adjoining rotundal building of the water-and-mud baths were built in Rauschen (now Svetlogorsk) in 1907-1908 according to the project of the architect Otto Walter Kukkuk. The building was designed in the German national romanticism style (art Nouveau, mixed with local building traditions). The 25-meter tower has become the architectural dominant of the upper town.

The tower served to supply Rauschen with water. The source of the water was the feeders at the Mill-Pond. Visitors of the balneary could take warm marine and carbonic baths. Also in the balneary there was mud, electric, light treatment and therapeutic massage. Under the roof there was an observation deck with a view to the sea, but now it is closed for tourists.

In 1978 a solar clock was installed on the water tower. It was designed according to the project of local Artist and sculptor Nikolai Frolov. Currently, the tower and balneary belong to the Svetlogorsk central military sanatorium. The Water tower is also considered to be an object of cultural heritage.
