= 1972 Svetlogorsk Antonov An-24 crash =

Soviet Navy aircraft crash

1972 Svetlogorsk An-24 crash
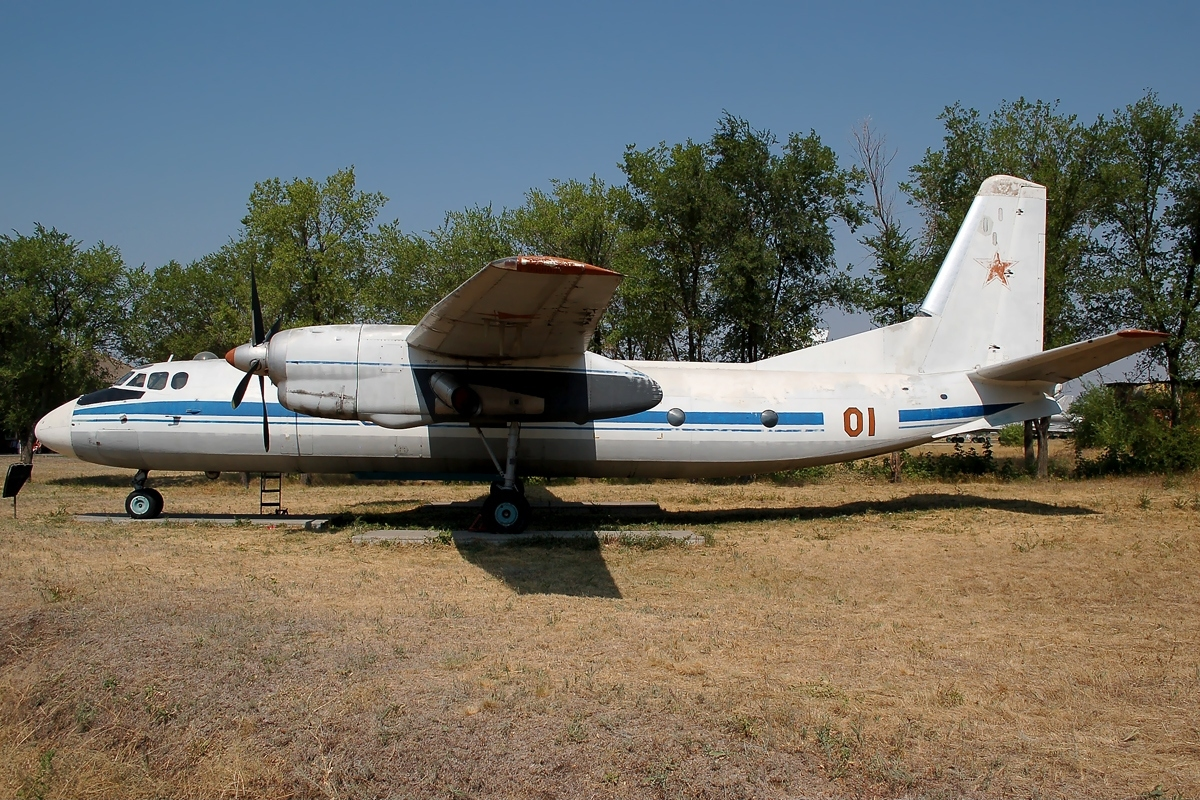
- Museum display of an Antonov An-24T of the same type as the accident aircraft

Accident
- Date: 16 May 1972
- Summary: Controlled flight into terrain
- Site: Svetlogorsk, Kaliningrad Oblast, Russian SFSR, Soviet Union; 54°56′38″N 020°09′45″E
- Total fatalities: 33 or 35

Aircraft
- Aircraft type: Antonov An-24T
- Operator: Soviet Naval Aviation
- Registration: 05
- Flight origin: Khrabrovo Airport, Kaliningrad, Russian SFSR, Soviet Union
- Destination: Kosa, Soviet Union
- Occupants: 8
- Passengers: 2
- Crew: 6
- Fatalities: 8
- Survivors: 0

Ground casualties
- Ground fatalities: 25 or 27
- Ground injuries: 3

A Soviet Navy Antonov An-24 aircraft crashed into a kindergarten building in Svetlogorsk in Kaliningrad Oblast in the Soviet Union on 16 May 1972. The crash killed all eight people aboard the plane and 25 to 27 people on the ground, most of them children at a kindergarten.

== Aircraft ==
The accident aircraft was a Soviet Naval Aviation Antonov An-24T (NATO reporting name "Coke") military transport aircraft manufactured in 1969 with the manufacturer's serial number 9911302. It bore the registration number 05. The 263rd Independent Transport Aviation Regiment, a unit of the Soviet Navy's Twice Red Banner Baltic Fleet, operated the plane.

== Flight ==
The aircraft took off from Khrabrovo Airport outside Kaliningrad at approximately 12:15 on 16 May 1972 with eight people — a crew of six and two passengers — aboard. Sources provide different descriptions of the nature of the flight. Some describe it as a 15-minute weather research flight along the Baltic Sea coast of the Soviet Union with two weather researchers aboard as passengers, while others indicate that the flight conducted radio tests related to meteorological research at an altitude of 3,000 to 4,000 metres (9,840 to 13,100 ft), and that in either case the aircraft was on descent for a return to Khrabrovo Airport at the time of the crash. However, other sources claim that the plane was carrying its two passengers to the village of Kosa, where they were to inspect radio equipment. Still other sources provide a more detailed flight plan, stating that the An-24T was to take off from Khrabrovo Airport, fly over Zelenogradsk and Cape Taran, land at the airfield at Kosa, then fly on to the Kaliningrad Chkalovsk naval airbase, where it would land before returning to Khrabrovo Airport; these sources also claim that the flight was to take place at an altitude of approximately 500 metres (1,640 feet). In 2012, a retired Soviet Navy officer who claimed to have served in the 263rd Independent Transport Aviation Regiment at the time of the crash, Mikhail Slobodchikov, told the Kaliningrad newspaper Novye Kolesa that the An-24T flight was made in response to recent unauthorized incursions into Soviet airspace by foreign aircraft, and that as a way of determining how the foreign aircraft were achieving this the An-24T had to fly the mission at very low altitudes even in poor weather conditions to test the ability of Soviet radar stations to detect it, although a local historian of the Svetlogorsk area, Vladimir Voronov, has dismissed Slobodchikov's account because of a lack of evidence in official records of any Soviet effort to investigate aircraft incursions in the region at the time.

After climbing, the An-24T approached a point near Zelenogradsk, locked onto it, and headed toward Cape Taran. To maintain its assigned bearing, it then made a turn over the Baltic Sea and pilot-in-command Captain of Aviation Viloriy Gutnik informed ground controllers that he was descending from 500 metres (1,640 feet) to 150 metres (490 feet). Less than 15 minutes after takeoff the aircraft crossed the coastline and entered a bank of dense fog which prevented the crew from seeing the ground. Despite the lack of visual meteorological conditions, the crew decided to continue the flight under visual flight rules rather than use instrument flight rules. Without realizing it, the crew descended to a dangerously low altitude in the fog.

With the altimeter indicating an altitude of 150 metres (492 feet), the plane's right wing struck a pine tree on a steep, upward-sloping bank along the seashore at an altitude of 42 metres (138 feet); some sources state that the distance from the base of the steep bank to the top of the pine tree was no more than 85 metres (279 ft). Gutnik apparently sighted the rising terrain at the last second and attempted a sharp pull-up, but too late to avoid striking the tree. The collision, which occurred 14 minutes 48 seconds after takeoff, sheared off the top of the tree and about half of the wing, causing the plane to go out of control and veer off course. The descending An-24T remained airborne for less than 30 seconds after striking the tree; one eyewitness reported that after the plane hit the tree, he saw it circle the Svetlogorsk city stadium and narrowly miss the Ferris wheel in an amusement park, avoiding it by only a few metres. The plane hit more trees and bushes, its tail hit the ground, and it crashed nose-first at high speed into the second floor of a kindergarten building in Svetlogorsk about 200 metres (660 feet) from the pine tree it initially struck. It hit the school at about 12:30 while the children in the building were at lunch. On impact, the plane's fuselage crashed in a small garden and broke up, the wings and landing gear detached, and the cockpit section came to rest on a road adjacent to the building. The building collapsed, burying its occupants under rubble. The plane had taken off with a full load of aviation fuel which ignited, starting a fire which engulfed the wreckage of the building within seconds. The fire consumed the plane's wreckage and the school building.

The crash killed all eight occupants of the plane. Gutnik's body was found in the cockpit section still clutching the controls, and the body of Senior Lieutenant of Aviation Viktor Baranov, the copilot, was found on the road.

Confusion exists as to the number of people killed on the ground. According to some sources, 27 people — 24 children and three adults — were in the school building. All 24 children — ranging from two to seven years old — and three adults died in the crash bringing the accident's death toll to 35. Other sources claim that 22 children died in the tragedy, but agree with the other sources that the crash killed all eight people aboard the plane and three adults at the school, for a total of 33 dead.

Confusion also exists as to the identities of the adults killed and injured at the school. One source states that two adults escaped the burning rubble through an opening in a collapsed wall. Some sources identify the dead adults as two teachers and a cook. One source specifically identifies them as Tamara Yankovskaya, a cook who died in the building, and two other staff members, Antonina Romanenko and Valentina Shabayeva-Metelitsa, who later died of burns in a military hospital. Another source identifies the adults as staff members Tamara Yankovskaya and Antonina Romanenko and Romanenko's friend Yulia Vorona, who had dropped by the school to visit that day; this source states that all three suffered severe burns and were taken to a military hospital, where Romanenko quickly died without regaining consciousness and Yankovskaya died six months later, but Vorona survived. Yet another source describes the surviving adult as a nanny who was washing windows at the school at the time of the crash and whose daughter died in the building.

Among the children enrolled at the school, the only survivors were three children who stayed home from school that day. Another child, a six-year-old boy enrolled at the school but kept home that day because of an ear infection, was walking home from a doctor's appointment with his grandmother when they passed the school and he saw his mother, who worked as a teacher at the kindergarten, in the building; he rushed into the building to see her just as the plane struck and was killed, and his body was the last to be recovered from the rubble.

Two high school girls walking past the building at the time of the crash were enveloped in aviation fuel vapors and suffered serious burns when the vapor ignited, engulfing them in flames and setting their hair, clothes, and shoes on fire; they suffered painful burns, but survived. Had the plane crashed in the nearby amusement park, casualties probably would have been much higher.

== Aftermath ==
Vacationers visiting the amusement park and schoolchildren in a physical education class at the Svetlogorsk city stadium were the first to see the falling plane, and they heard the sound of a tremendous impact as it struck the building. Firefighters, police, Baltic Fleet sailors, and other Soviet military personnel arrived quickly at the crash scene and found a raging fire fanned by swirling winds. Distraught relatives of the children who died in the crash and fire gathered around the school building. Within minutes of the crash, armed soldiers formed a triple cordon around the crash site and pushed bystanders back to a safe distance while firefighters fought the blaze and pulled human remains from the building. By the evening of 16 May, police and volunteers had begun to patrol the coastline because of a fear that grief-stricken relatives of the dead would attempt to drown themselves in the Baltic Sea.

== Cover-up ==
North Atlantic Treaty Organization (NATO) radio monitoring stations on Bornholm Island in the Baltic Sea intercepted Soviet military communications regarding the crash, and at 16:00 on 16 May, Radio Free Europe in Munich, West Germany, broadcast: "An An-26 [sic] military transport plane of the Baltic Fleet's naval aviation crashed three hours ago into a kindergarten in Svetlogorsk (Kaliningrad Oblast). Among the dead were children under 6 years old, teachers, and the plane's crew — more than 30 people in total." However, the Soviet Union had a policy of strict secrecy regarding domestic aircraft accidents, and upon receiving word of the crash, Soviet authorities sprang into action to prevent information about the incident from spreading. They declared a 24-hour state of emergency in Svetlogorsk, cut off telephone, telegraph, and electricity service, prohibited travel in the area, canceled commuter trains operating between Kaliningrad and Svetlogorsk, and ordered residents to remain in their homes. They also sent KGB (Committee for State Security) officers into Svetlogorsk to tell residents that no disaster had occurred, but the kindergarten was a prestigious one where many prominent people of the Svetlogorsk area enrolled their children, and word of the tragedy already had spread throughout the city.

To cover up the incident, military personnel worked at the site of the fire throughout the night of 16–17 May 1972, removing the wreckage of the aircraft and building by truck, leaving only a black, scorched area where the building had stood. They also removed the scorched earth and covered the area with sod, and by 17 May no trace of the aircraft or building remained at the crash site, although the smell of aviation fuel lingered in the vicinity for two weeks and people walking on nearby trails discovered bricks from the building, charred children's books and toys, and equipment from the An-24T scattered around the area. Authorities also cut down and removed all the trees damaged in the crash. Some sources claim that by the morning of 17 May, a flower bed had been planted on the site to further conceal the disaster, although another source describes this as a myth. The rubble from the school building later was discovered in a landfill on the outskirts of Svetlogorsk.

One source states that two adults who escaped from the burning school building through an opening in a wall — identifying them as Tamara Yankovskaya, who did not die of her injuries until six months after the accident, and Yulia Vorona, who survived — received frequent visits from KGB officers during their hospital stays. The KGB officers offered them any Soviet government assistance they needed in exchange for their silence about the crash.

The dead from the school building were buried in a mass grave in a cemetery near the Svetlogorsk-I railway station, while the bodies of the occupants of the plane were buried elsewhere; seven were buried in the city cemetery in Kaliningrad and Baranov's body was claimed by his widow for burial elsewhere. One source claims that the AN-24T's passengers and crew were not buried in the same cemetery as the people killed in the building because the mothers of the deceased children held the pilots responsible for the tragedy and did not want them buried near their children, but another source asserts that the decision to bury the plane's occupants in a different cemetery was part of the overall cover-up, intended to obscure the connection between the deaths of the people aboard the plane and the deaths of those in the building. To reduce the profile of the funeral for the children, Soviet authorities cancelled all train service to the area on the day it took place and restricted road traffic to Svetlogorsk, alleging a need for emergency repairs to the roads. Nonetheless, 7,000 people attended the children's funeral. The authorities prohibited filming of the funeral.

Despite Radio Free Europe's report of the incident within hours of its occurrence, the Soviet press made no mention of it. On the 50th anniversary of the crash in 2022, the Russian press reported that relatives of the victims at the school probably received no compensation of any kind from the Soviet government.

== Cause ==
A commission rushed from Moscow to Svetlogorsk to investigate the accident amid immediate speculation that it had occurred because of some type of instrument failure. After interviewing everyone involved in the flight and examining data from the aircraft's flight recorders, the commission members apparently reached a conclusion as to the cause of the accident but did not publicly disclose it, offering only a vague public statement that the crash occurred because of "inadequate preparation and management of the flight." The Soviet government classified the official details of the accident and never opened a criminal investigation of the crash, although the Soviet Ministry of Defense dismissed approximately 40 military officials because of the tragedy. The Soviet Union collapsed in December 1991 without ever declassifying information on the crash. As of November 2024 the government of the Russian Federation, the Soviet Union's successor state, also had not released information about the investigation into the crash.

With no open reporting of the incident provided by the Soviet or Russian governments, various myths and hypotheses about the cause of the crash arose in Svetlogorsk, centering around a consensus that the pilots must have been responsible. One popular explanation that quickly arose held that a toxicology report had concluded that the pilots were drunk at the time of the crash, but one source claims that a pathologist's report denies the presence of alcohol in the pilot's systems. Another popular idea was that the crash occurred when the An-24T's pilots had descended to look at naked women sunbathing on the beach at Svetlogorsk, although one source claims that the air temperature in Svetlogorsk at the time of the crash was 6 °C (43 °F), making the notion of nudity on the beach preposterous. Another hypothesis was that the crew was inexperienced and neglected safety procedures, but colleagues of Gutnik described him as a highly skilled pilot, disciplined and meticulous, with 5,000 hours of flight time.

Eventually, the Russian press reported that the altimeter indicated an altitude of 150 metres (492 ft) at the time the An-24T struck the pine tree, whose top was no more than 85 metres (279 ft) above sea level. Sources report a general consensus among aviation analysts that the An-24T crew did not enter the correct local barometric pressure for Khrabrovo Airport into the altimeter setting for the aircraft's pressure altimeter, leading to the altimeter indicating a greater altitude than actually was the case. In addition, Soviet Naval Aviation had decided just before the flight to remove altimeters from Ilyushin Il-14 (NATO reporting name "Crate") aircraft and install them aboard An-24s, inadvertently introducing a calibration error in the relocated altimeters that caused them to display an altitude 60 to 70 metres (200 to 230 ft) higher than the plane's actual altitude. The Soviet Navy did not conduct tests of the reinstalled altimeters aboard its An-24 aircraft until after the Svetlogorsk crash, and therefore the pilots did not know of the discrepancy. Although the crew maintained routine communications with ground controllers throughout the flight, insufficient air traffic control support also contributed to the tragedy, as did poor visibility.

When Mikhail Slobodchikov gave his version of events to Novye Kolesa in 2012, he addressed the rumor that the pilots had been drunk at the time of the accident, claiming that toxicological testing had indeed found alcohol in the systems of five members of the crew, and that this information had been suppressed to avoid harsher penalties for Soviet officials and to ensure that the crew members' relatives received full compensation. This claim raises the possibility that some of the crew members — although unlikely to have boarded the aircraft drunk — might still have had alcohol in their systems from drinking the evening before the flight.

== Commemoration ==
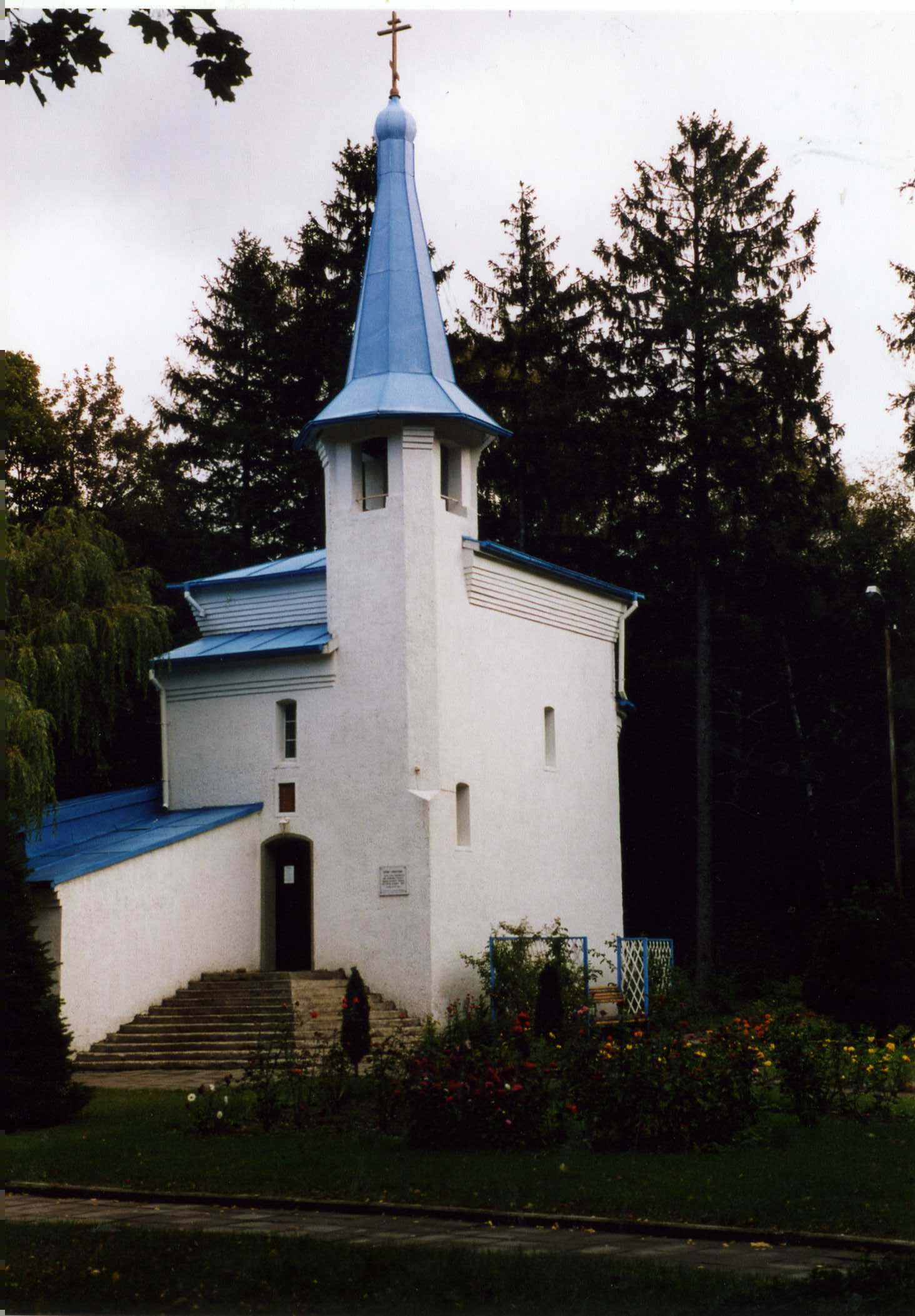
The chapel at the crash site, photographed on 16 February 2009.

In January 1994, a small chapel — the Church of the Icon of the Mother of God "Joy of All Who Sorrow" — was completed on the former site of the kindergarten building as a memorial to the people killed in the building. Metropolitan Kirill of Smolensk and Kaliningrad consecrated it in November 1994. The chapel houses a display of photographs of the victims, and memorial candles remain lit at all times in the chapel. A commemorative plaque at the chapel reads: "The memorial church in honor of the icon of the Mother of God 'Joy of All Who Sorrow' was built on the site of the tragic destruction of a kindergarten on 16 May 1972." As of the 45th anniversary of the disaster on 16 May 2017, parents of the deceased children continued to gather annually at the chapel on 16 May in remembrance of the dead. Baltic Fleet personnel attend and bring flowers to each annual gathering.

The names of the occupants of the aircraft are not displayed at the chapel. One source claims that this is because mothers of the dead children believed the reports that the pilots were drunk and did not want them memorialized alongside the dead children.
