= Svetlogorsk-II railway station =

Railway station in Svetlogorsk, Russia

Svetlogorsk-II Светлогорск-II
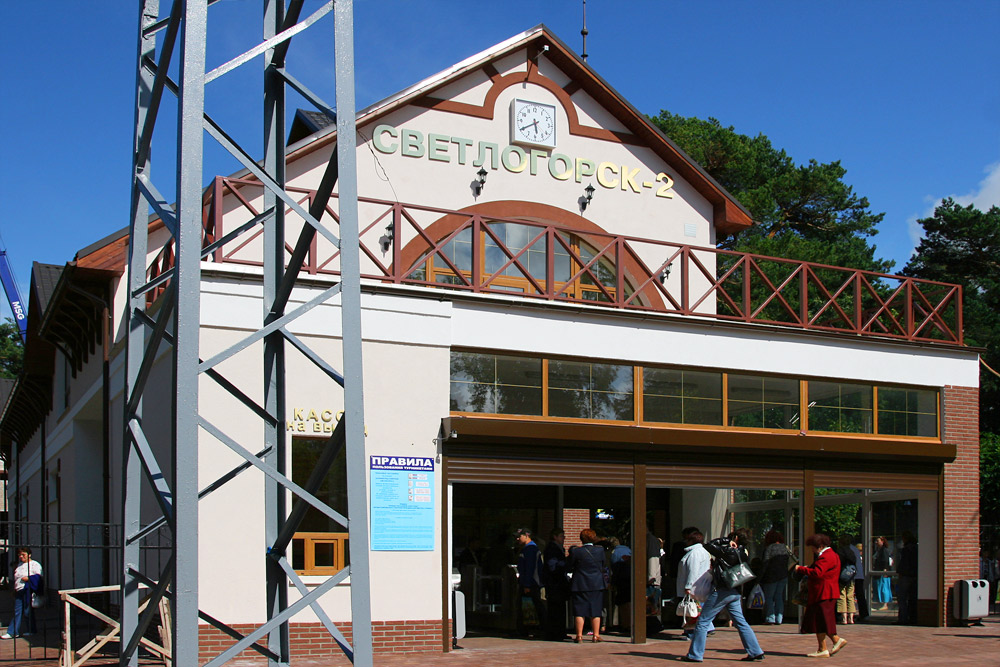
- View of the station

General information
- Location: 33, Lenina Str, Svetlogorsk, Russia
- Coordinates: 54.944107°N 20.146877°E
- Platforms: 2
- Tracks: 2

Construction
- Parking: yes

Other information
- Station code: 103828

History
- Opened: 1906
- Rebuilt: 1975, 2006
- Electrified: 1976
- Former names: Rauschen-Düne

Services
Preceding station	Russian Railways	Following station
Svetlogorsk-I towards Kaliningrad South	Kaliningrad–Svetlogorsk	Terminus
Location

Svetlogorsk-II railway station (Russian: станция Светлогорск-II) is a railway station located in Svetlogorsk, Kaliningrad oblast, Russia. It is a terminal station for the Kaliningrad — Svetlogorsk railway. Electric trains ES2G Lastochka make a passenger trips from Svetlogorsk-II. The station is located in the town center.

== History ==
The station Rauschen-Düne was opened on 6 May 1906 with the construction of the branch line from Rauschen-Ort (now Svetlogorsk-I railway station). Rauschen-Düne station was more convenient for passengers, as unlike Rauschen-Ort station it is located in the city center. In the 1920s, the popularity of the resort increased. There was a boom in construction. Building materials were removed to Rauschen by trains. The number of passenger trains also increased to 12-15 at the weekend.

At the end of the Second World War, the rolling stock was removed from East Prussia. Tracks, overpasses, water and power equipment were put out of order. Repair works continued until 1947. After the war the first train from Kaliningrad arrived to Svetlogorsk-II station in 1947.

New station building was built in 1975. It was decorated with three-dimensional mosaic reliefs in the style of socialist realism by the works of artists Nikolai Frolov, Oleg Atroshchenko and Albert Shestakov. Svetlogorsk-II station was electrified DC and equipped with automatic train protection in 1976. By the 2000s the station building not only needed major repairs, but also ceased to meet the aesthetic and architectural requirements of the main resort of the region and the requirements for stations with intensive passenger traffic. In December 2006, a new station building was constructed. It has a waiting room for 150 people, six ticket offices, buffets and rest rooms.

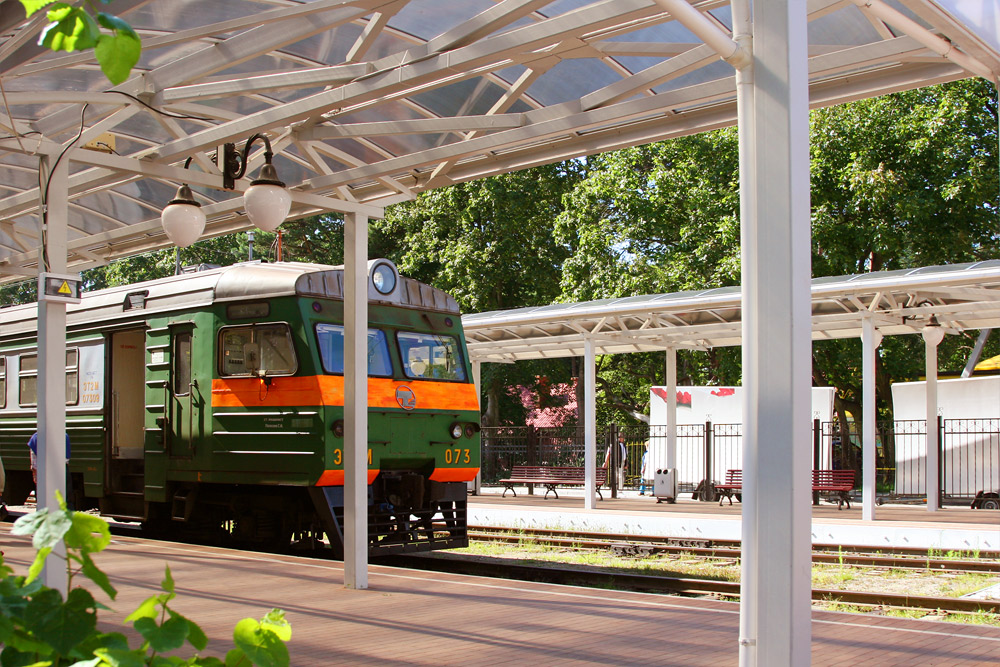
ET2M in Svetlogorsk

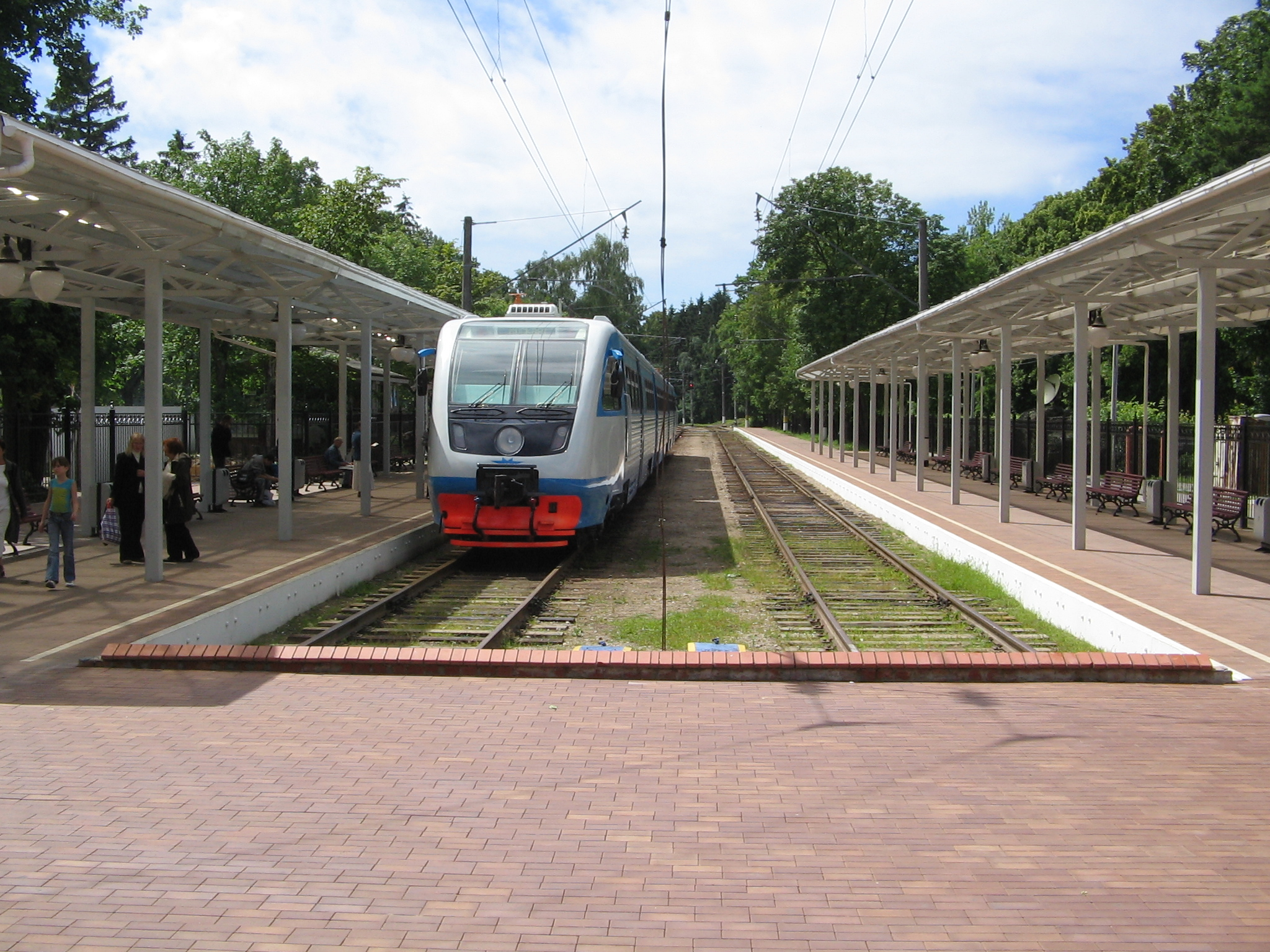
RA2 railbus

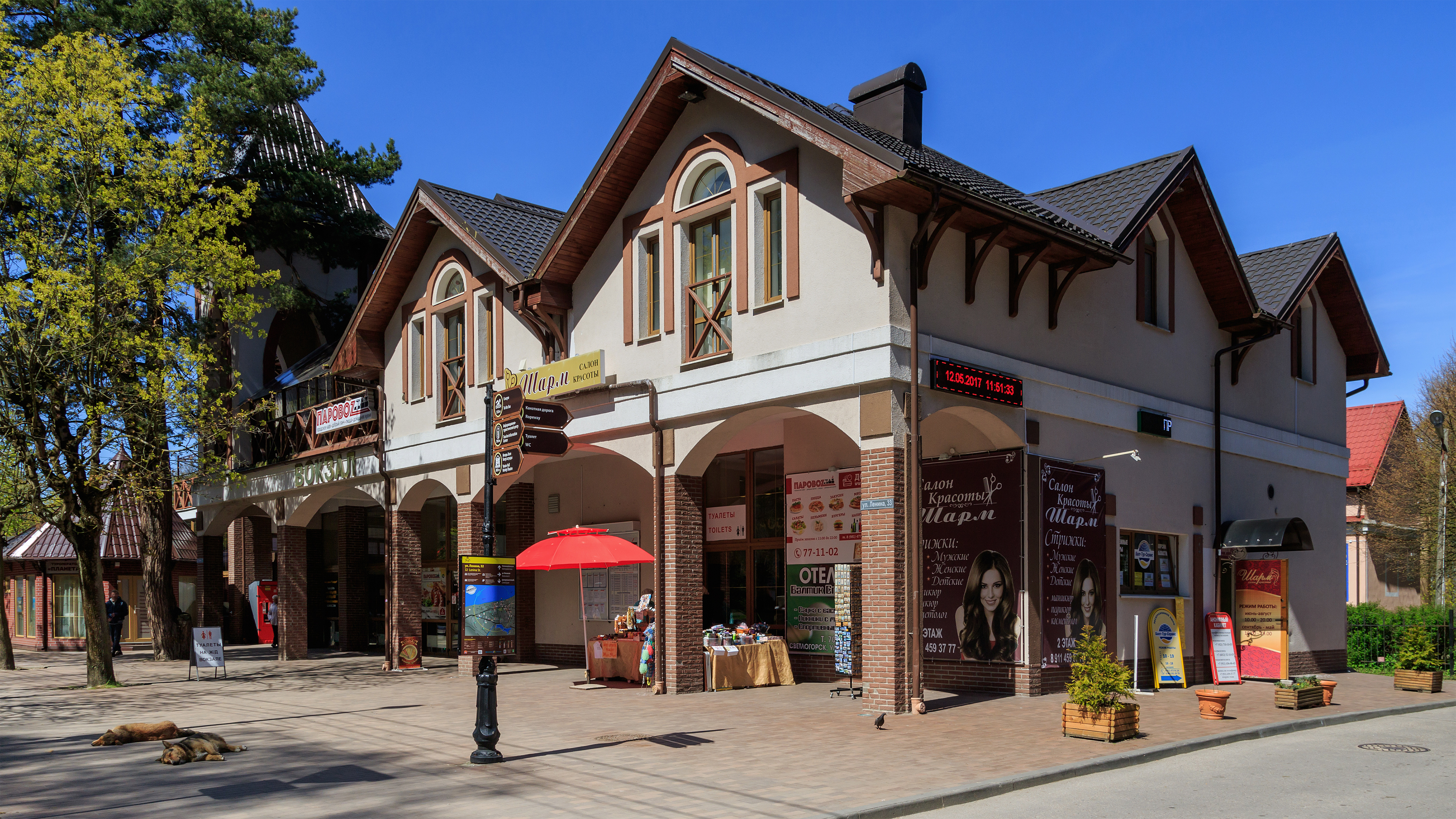
View of the station from Lennia Street
