= Svetlogorsky District =

Svetlogorsky District Светлогорский район (Russian)
- District
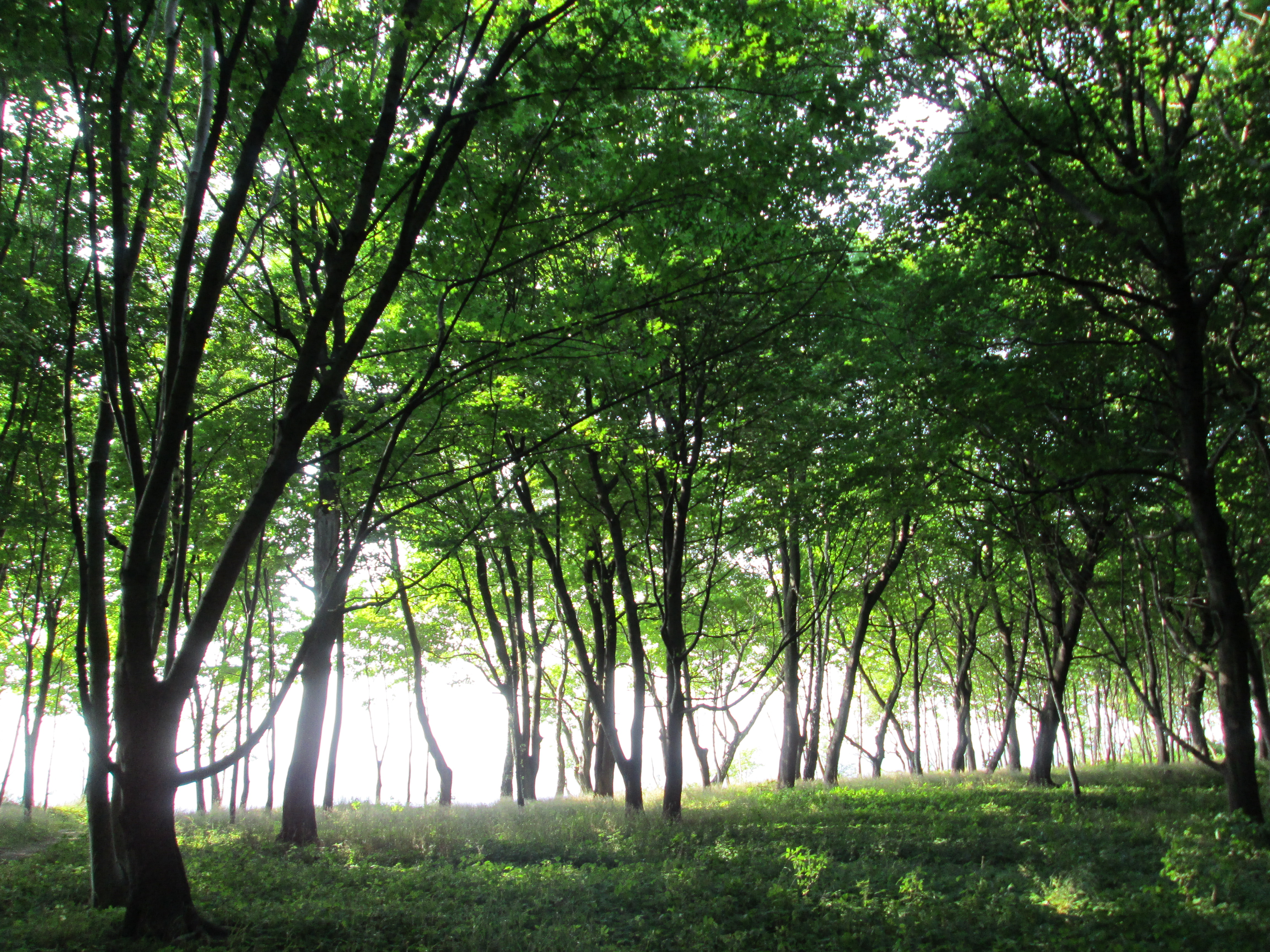
- Yantarny Park, a protected area of Russia, in Svetlogorsky District

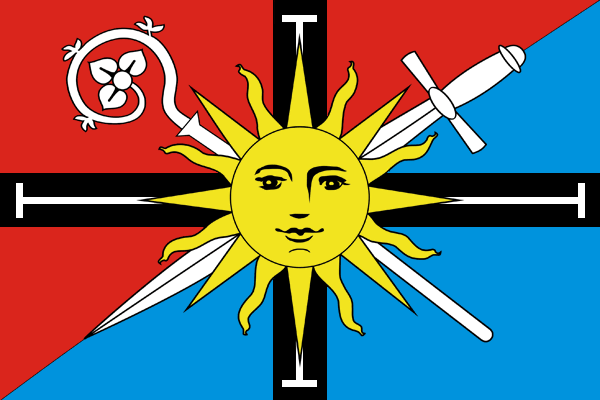
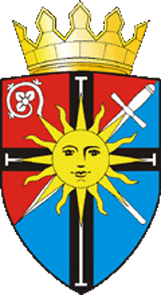
- Flag Coat of arms
- Location of Svetlogorsky District in Kaliningrad Oblast
- Coordinates: 54°56′N 20°09′E
- Country: Russia
- Federal subject: Kaliningrad Oblast
- Established: 2 November 2007
- Administrative center: Svetlogorsk

Area
  - Total: 33.16 km^{2} (12.80 sq mi)

Population (2010 Census)
  - Total: 14,875
  - Density: 448.6/km^{2} (1,162/sq mi)
  - Urban: 98.5%
  - Rural: 1.5%

Administrative structure
  - Administrative divisions: 1 Towns of district significance, 2 Urban-type settlements of district significance
  - Inhabited localities: 1 cities/towns, 2 urban-type settlements, 4 rural localities

Municipal structure
  - Municipally incorporated as: Svetlogorsky Municipal District
  - Municipal divisions: 3 urban settlements, 0 rural settlements
- Website: http://www.svetlogorsk39.ru

Svetlogorsky District (Russian: Светлого́рский райо́н) is an administrative district (raion), one of the fifteen in Kaliningrad Oblast, Russia. As a municipal division, it is incorporated as Svetlogorsky Municipal District. It is located in the west of the oblast. The area of the district is 33.16 square kilometers (12.80 sq mi). Its administrative center is the town of Svetlogorsk. As of the 2010 Census, the total population of the district was 14,875, with the population of Svetlogorsk accounting for 72.4% of that number.
