= Michael Oberlechner =

Austrian politician (born 1979)

Member of the National Council
- Incumbent
- Assumed office 24 October 2024
- Constituency: Vienna

Personal details
- Born: 16 May 1979 (age 46)
- Party: Freedom Party

Michael Oberlechner (born 16 May 1979) is an Austrian politician of the Freedom Party serving as a member of the National Council since 2024. He has been a district councillor of Ottakring since 2010.
