= Svetlogorsk-I railway station =

Railway station in Svetlogorsk, Russia

Svetlogorsk-I Светлогорск-I
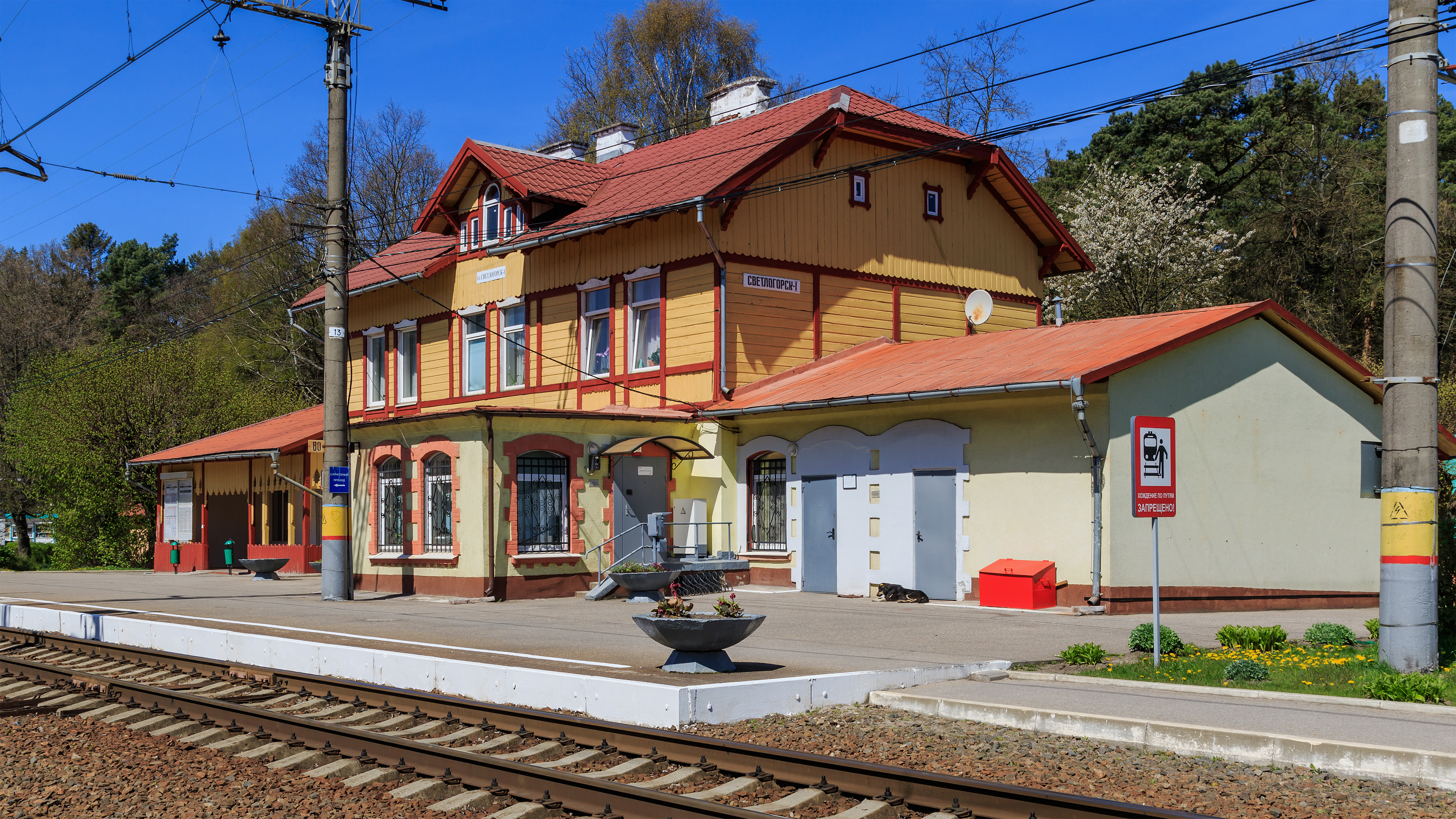
- View of the station

General information
- Location: 30, Kaliningradsky Ave, Svetlogorsk, Russia
- Coordinates: 54.933454°N 20.160615°E
- Platforms: 3
- Tracks: 3

Construction
- Parking: yes

Other information
- Station code: 103813

History
- Opened: 1900
- Former names: Rauschen-Ort

Services
| Preceding station | Russian Railways | Following station |
|---|---|---|
| Pionerskyy Kurort towards Kaliningrad South | Kaliningrad–Svetlogorsk | Svetlogorsk-II Terminus |
Location

Svetlogorsk-I railway station (Russian: станция Светлогорск-1) is a railway station located in Svetlogorsk, Kaliningrad oblast, Russia. It is 41 km down-line from Kaliningrad North railway station and is situated between Pionersky kururt and Primorsk-Novy on the Kaliningrad — Baltiysk line. The station hosts suburban trains from Kaliningrad. Electric trains ES1 Lastochka and ET2M make a passenger trips from Svetlogorsk-I. The station is approximately 1 km from the town center.

== History ==
The station Rauschen-Ort was opened in 1900 with the construction of the Königsberg Nordbahnhof — Neukuhren — Warnicken railway. The construction was financed by the budget of the German Empire and Kingdom of Prussia. The opening ceremony of the railway took place on 14 July 1900. Opening of the railway triggered the economic growth. After the opening of Rauschen-Düne station (now Svetlogorsk-II) station, the cargo traffic through Rauschen-Ort increased. Building materials were removed by trains. They were necessary for the developing resort. By the 1920s, the resort of Rauschen had become very popular. The station handled from 12 to 15 passenger trains at the week-end.

At the end of the Second World War, the rolling stock was removed from East Prussia. Tracks, overpasses, water and power equipments were put out of order. Repair works continued until 1947. After the war the first train from Kaliningrad arrived in Rauschen on 4 June 1947. Svetlogorsk-I station was electrified DC and equipped with automatic train protection in the 1970s.
