= Svetlogorsk, Kaliningrad Oblast =

Town in Kaliningrad Oblast, Russia

Svetlogorsk Светлогорск
- Town
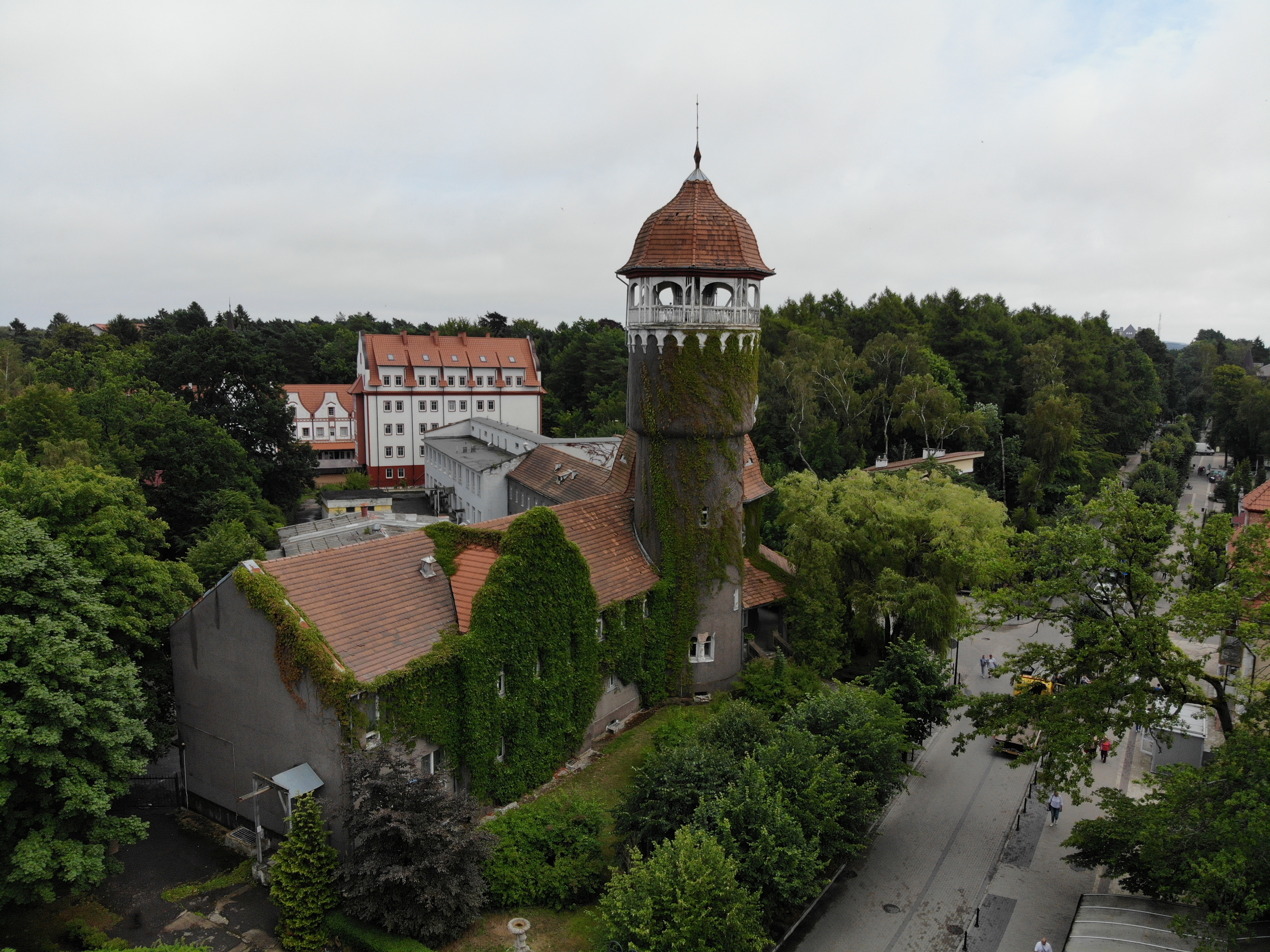
- View of Svetlogorsk with the iconic Rauschener Wasserturm in the foreground, a symbol of the town built during the German era.

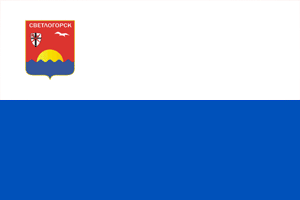
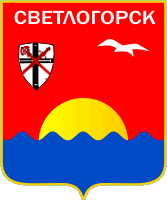
- Flag Coat of arms
- Interactive map of Svetlogorsk
- Location of Svetlogorsk Svetlogorsk (European Russia) Svetlogorsk (Europe) Svetlogorsk (Baltic Sea) Svetlogorsk (Russia)
- Coordinates: 54°57′N 20°09′E
- Country: Russia
- Federal subject: Kaliningrad Oblast
- Administrative district: Svetlogorsky District
- Town of district significanceSelsoviet: Svetlogorsk
- Founded: 1258
- Elevation: 40 m (130 ft)

Population (2010 Census)
  - Total: 10,772
  - Estimate (2023): 16,771 (+55.7%)

Administrative status
  - Capital of: Svetlogorsky District, town of district significance of Svetlogorsk

Municipal status
  - Municipal district: Svetlogorsky Municipal District
  - Urban settlement: Svetlogorskoye Urban Settlement
  - Capital of: Svetlogorsky Municipal District, Svetlogorskoye Urban Settlement
- Time zone: UTC+2 (MSK–1)
- Postal codes: 238560, 238561, 238563
- OKTMO ID: 27734000001
- Website: www.svetlogorsk39.ru

Svetlogorsk (Russian: Светлого́рск [svʲɪtlɐˈɡorsk]), prior to 1947 known by its German name Rauschen ([ˈʁaʊ̯ʃən]), is a coastal resort town and the administrative center of Svetlogorsky District of Kaliningrad Oblast, Russia, located on the coast of the Baltic Sea on the Sambia Peninsula, 39 kilometers (24 mi) northwest of Kaliningrad. In the 2021 census, it had a population of: 16,099 (2021 census); .

== History ==
Svetlogorsk is situated in the historical region of Sambia in Prussia. It was established in 1258 as a Sambian fisherman settlement named Ruse-moter (lit. region of cellars). The Teutonic Order that conquered the land gradually corrupted the name into Rause-moter, Raushe-moter, and finally Rauschen. The Teutonic Order set a new direction for the life of the village: they blocked off the Katzenbach stream, which flows into the lake, and installed a mill on the stream. From that time on, the lake became known as Mühlen-teich (Mill Pond), and the mill business became the main one for the inhabitants of the village. During the Order's times it was the largest mill in Sambia.

From 1701 it was part of the Kingdom of Prussia. In the early 19th century, the place became fashionable among German vacationers. Since access to the sea was hampered by a sand dune, the picturesque corners of the lake were the place of residence and recreation. A tavern was opened near the mill, new villas and boarding houses were built. On June 24, 1820, it was officially recognized as a spa town. During his visit to Rauschen in 1840, King Frederick William IV of Prussia ordered the sea embankment to be beautified. From 1871, it was part of the German Empire. The popularity of the town as a resort has grown significantly since 1900, when a railway was built from Königsberg to Rauschen / Orth station, extended in 1906 to Rauschen / Dune station, which made the resort more accessible for many residents of Königsberg. The city's development as a resort was enhanced when the equestrian society built a hippodrome. The town began to divide into the lower section – near the lake, and the upper section (40–50 m higher) by the sea. The upper village was approximately 60 m above sea level. In 1912 a funicular was built: a 90-meter inclined railroad to transport patrons to the sea and back.

In 1908, the resort was further enhanced by improving the beach areas with a wooden promenade built on the seashore on stilts, with several serpentine descents accessing the walkway. Otto Nicolai, Wilhelm von Humboldt, Käthe Kollwitz and Thomas Mann were among the celebrities who stayed there.

In the early years of the 20th century, private individuals launched an intensive construction in Rauschen of country houses, villas and boarding houses, especially in the upper part of the resort. The architecture of these buildings included half-timbered, neo-Gothic, and fashionable historicism, added to the beauty of the resort. In 1928, the villa of the architect Goering (namesake of the Reichsmarschall) was built in the center of Rauschen, becoming a kind of symbol of the city.

In 1900–1908, a tower of a hydrotherapy was erected in the style of national romanticism.

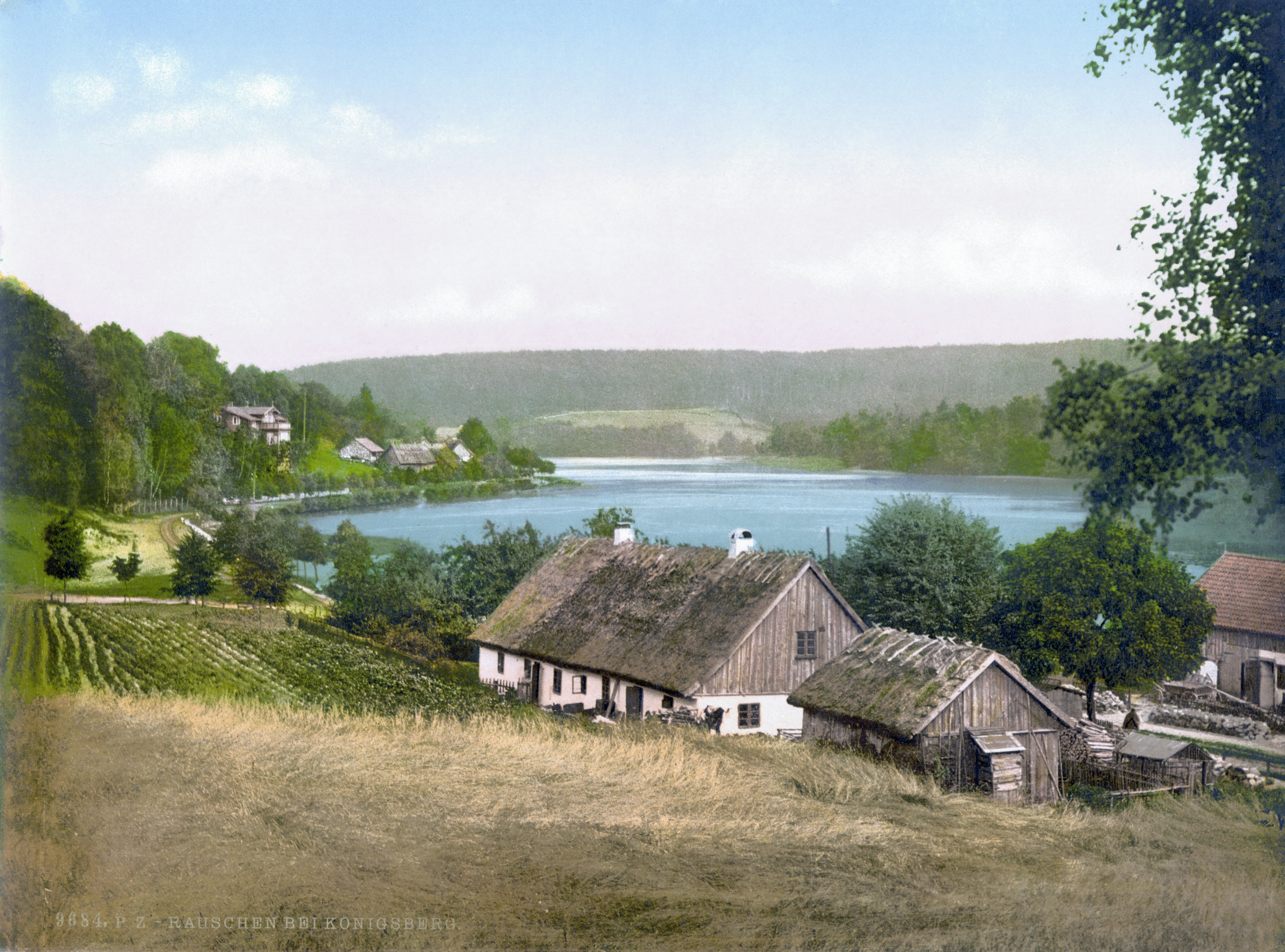
View around 1900

In addition to water treatment, sea, carbon dioxide and other baths, the sanatorium institutions of the city practiced mud, electric light treatment and therapeutic massage. Under the helmet-shaped roof of the tower there was an observation deck for viewing the countryside. Some buildings of the city were built by a charitable society, which consisted of local and visiting entrepreneurs and a wealthy part of the intelligentsia. They built, for example, a home for elderly teachers and a church erected in 1903–1907. The church was consecrated on July 7, 1907, it was built according to the project of architects Vihman and Kukuk in the neo-Romanesque style with elements of Art Nouveau. The attraction of the church was a carved wooden altar. Since 1841, this charitable society, together with the resort residents, has been printing the newspaper "Hospitable Raushenets".

During the First World War, Rauschen became a "branch" of the German military department – civilians were almost displaced by German officers who were being treated and were recuperating.

On April 14, 1945, Rauschen was conquered by the Soviet Union in the course of World War II. The German residents were forcibly expelled. It became a part of Kaliningrad Oblast and on June 17, 1947, was given its present name of Svetlogorsk.

On May 16, 1972, a tragedy occurred when a Soviet Naval Aviation Antonov An-24T military transport aircraft crashed into the Svetlogorsk kindergarten, killing all eight people on the plane and three adults and either 22 or 24 children on the ground, according to different sources.

In 1994, an urban district was formed, which also included the village of Yantarny and the Primorye settlement Council. The boundaries of the district were clarified in 1999. In 2007, the Svetlogorsk city district was granted the status of a municipal district, and Svetlogorsk was defined as its administrative center, three urban settlements were formed as part of the district, including the urban settlement of the city of Svetlogorsk. In 2018, the urban settlements were merged. In 2019, Svetlogorsk was awarded the status of a city of regional significance.

Today, it is a moderately popular summer resort town thanks to its beachfront and many spas, clubs, and attractions. It has preserved Prussian heritage and architecture amongst former Soviet towns that were once Prussian and did not suffer like Königsberg and other settlements in World War II.

== Administrative and municipal status ==
Within the framework of administrative divisions, Svetlogorsk serves as the administrative center of Svetlogorsky District. As an administrative division, it is incorporated within Svetlogorsky District as the town of district significance of Svetlogorsk. As a municipal division, the town of district significance of Svetlogorsk is incorporated within Svetlogorsky Municipal District as Svetlogorskoye Urban Settlement.

== Attractions ==
=== Water Tower ===
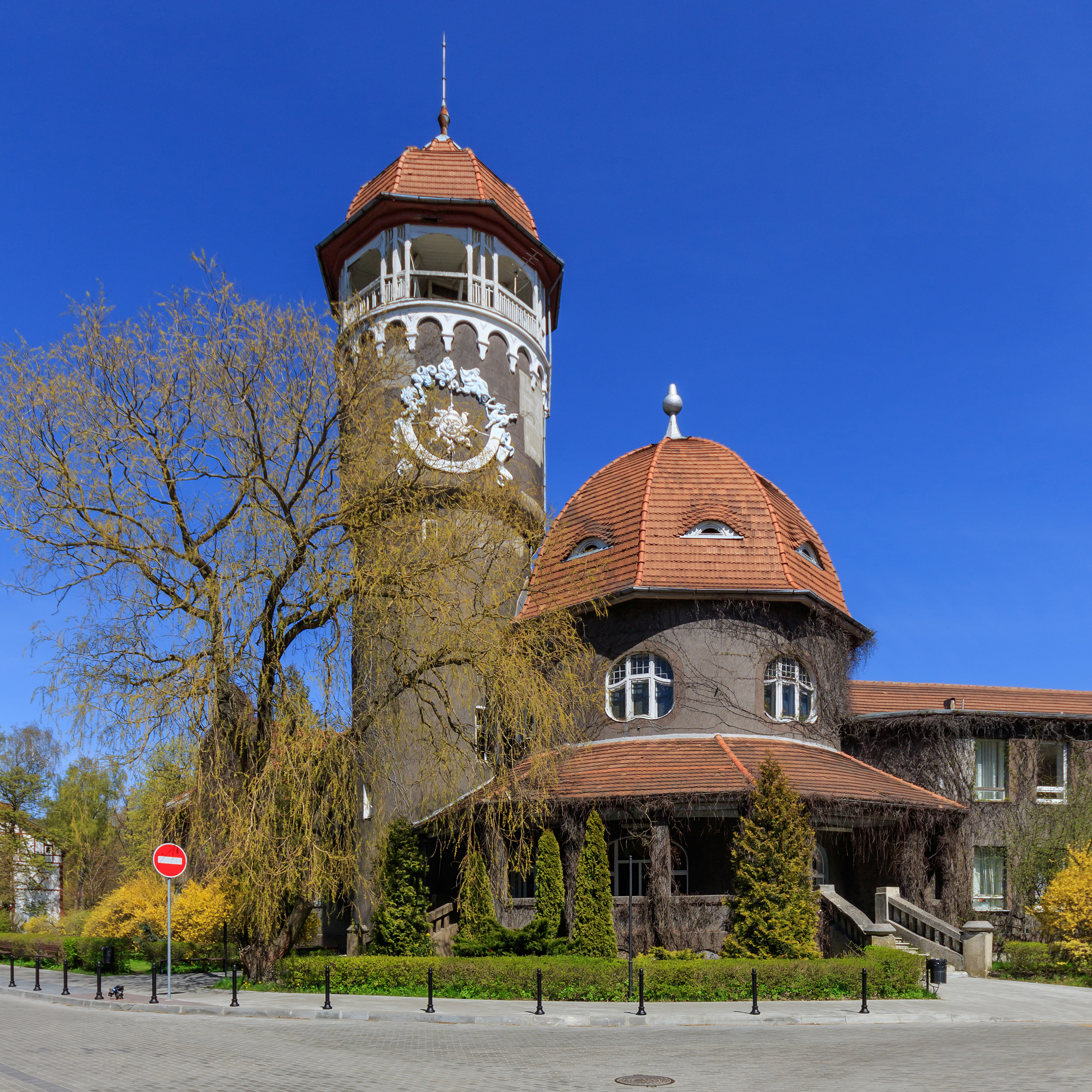
Water Tower

The water tower built in the early 20th century according to the project of the Prussian architect Otto Kukkuk from reinforced concrete structures. Being the tallest building of Raushen at that time, the 25-meter tower became the central point organizing the space of the city center, a kind of "town hall". The water in the hospital came from a tank, where it was previously pumped directly from the sea. Warm baths were intended mainly for those patients who could not go down to the water on their own on a steep slope.

=== The Zodiac sundial ===
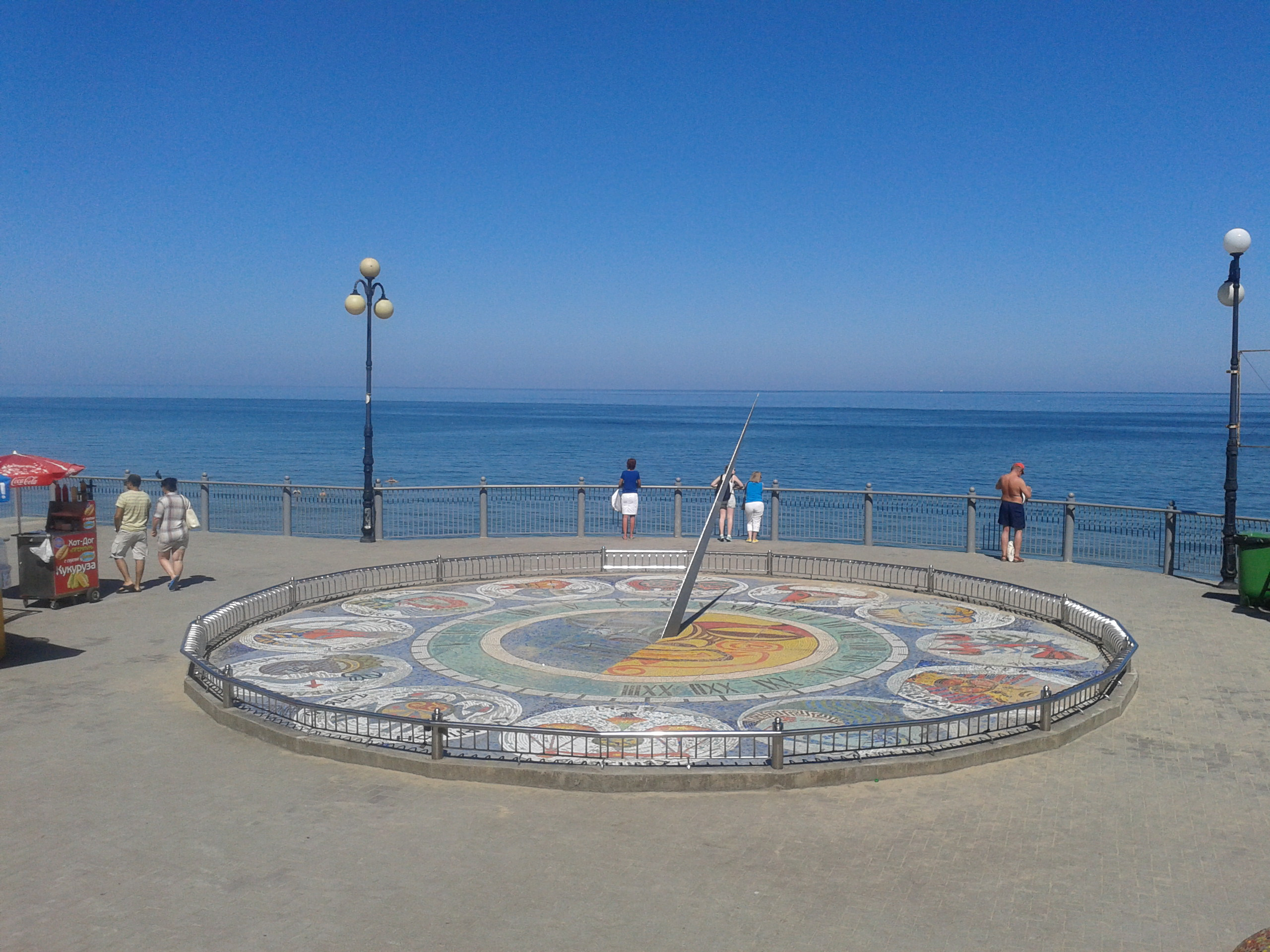
The Zodiac sundial

Zodiac sundial with a diameter of 10.1 meters. The work was carried out by a team of authors under the direction of sculptor Nikolai Pavlovich Frolov. It was installed in Svetlogorsk on the embankment in 1974 for the originality of the composition and the accuracy of the time display.

=== Nymph ===
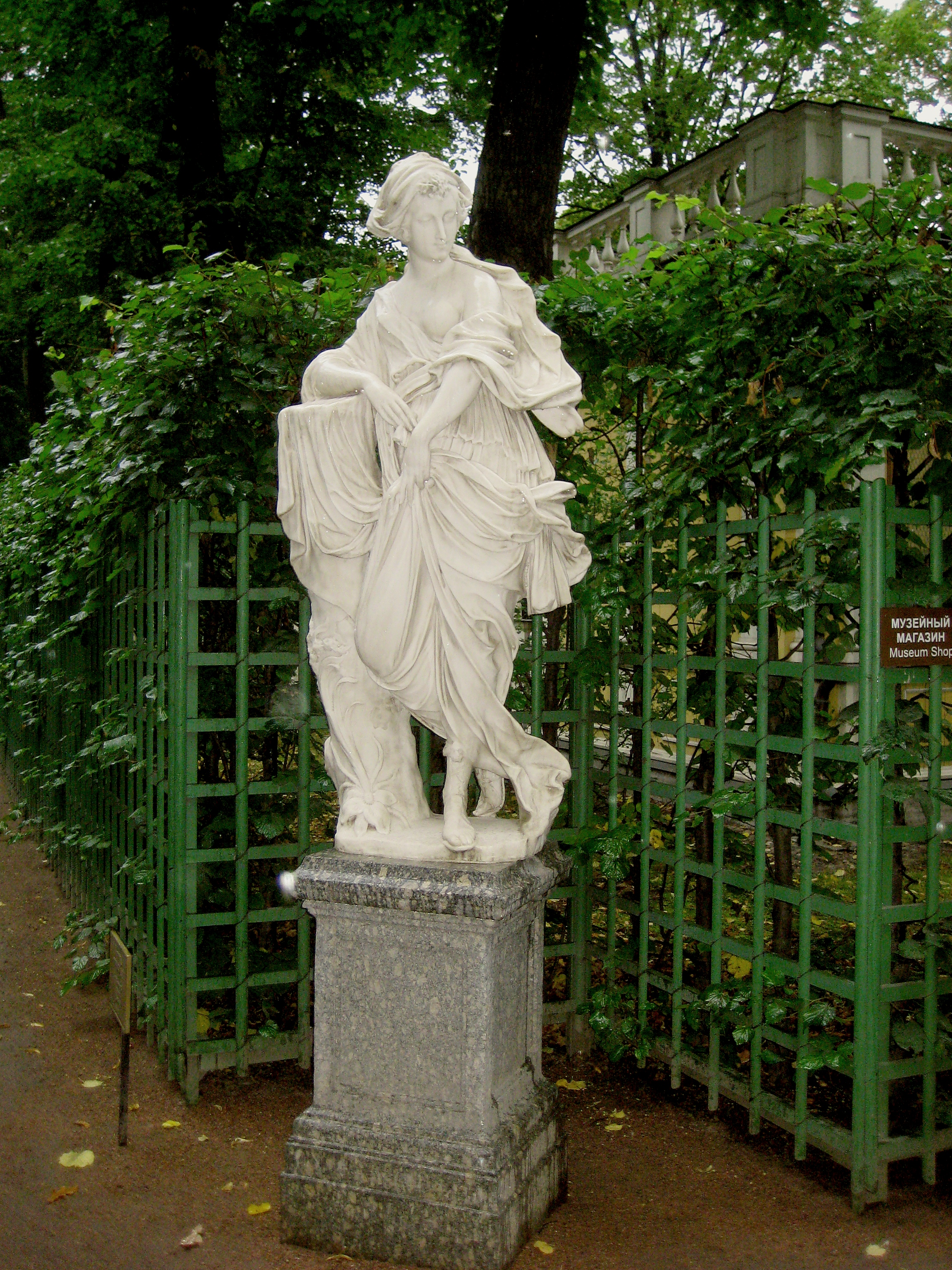
Nymph

The sculpture of a young nymph girl is a memorable symbols of Svetlogorsk. The statue stands on the promenade, decorating the exit to the embankment from a long staircase leading from the city center.Sculpture created by Herman Branch "Nymph". The creator of the sculpture is the German sculptor Herman Brachert, who lived and worked in the village of Otradnoye for more than 10 years.

=== Promenade ===
The embankment of the promenade with a length of over 1 km is decorated with unusual sculptural compositions – a bronze statue of a mermaid surrounded by fish and a statue of a naked nymph in a mother-of-pearl shell resting on mosaic waves of turquoise hue. The space separating the sculptural forms is filled with benches with semicircular canopies to protect from the sun and rain: here you can access the Internet for free via Wi-Fi.

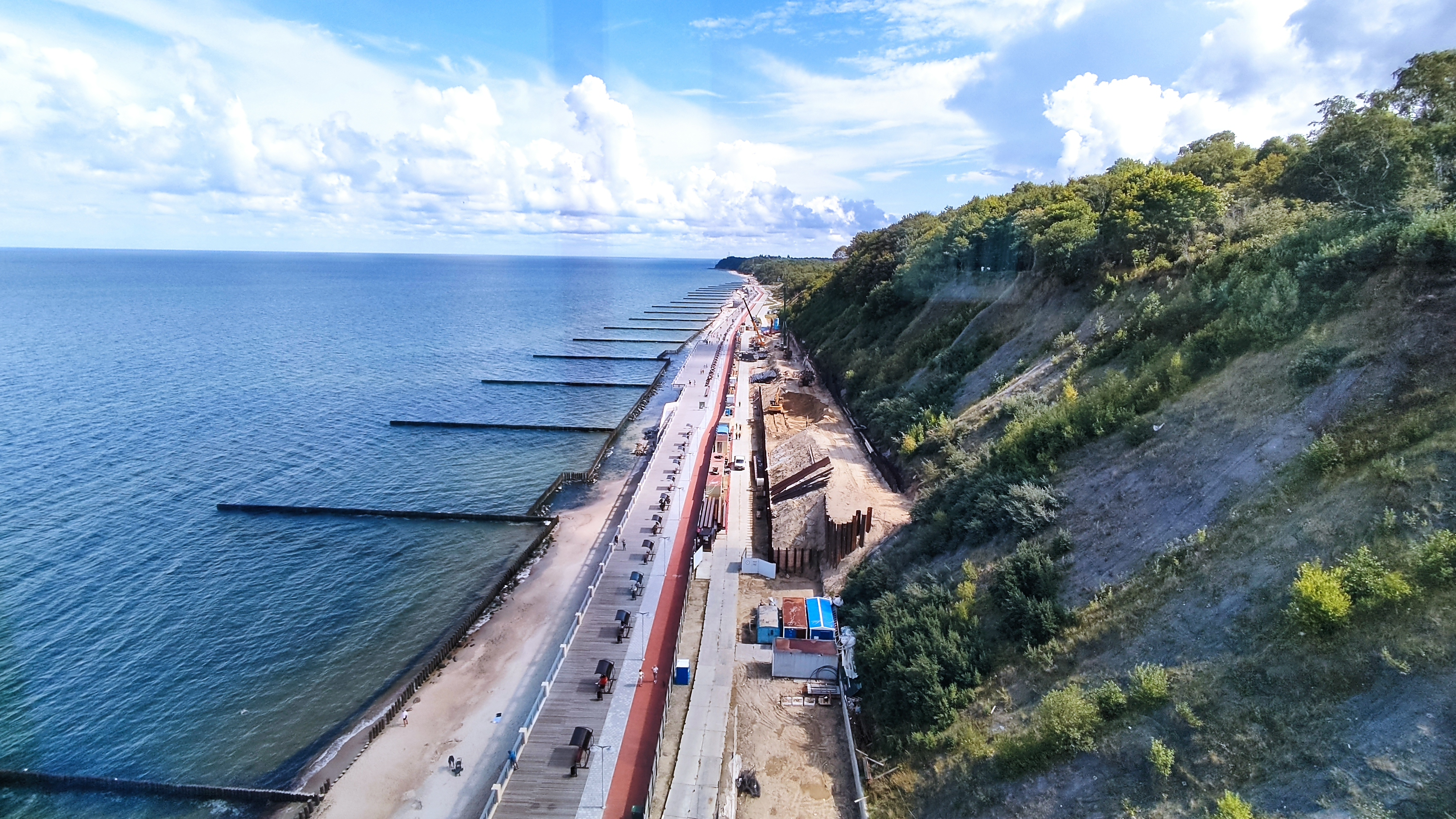
Promenade

=== Frog Princess ===
The sculpture "Frog Princess", created by the artist Oleg Melekhov, is a symbol of the city of modern times. An elegant and thin female figure, depicted in the form of a frog, is installed in a park near the railway station. The sculpture is a symbol of incessant movement, emphasized by the plasticity of a young girl. For Svetlogorsk, sculpture has become an image of rebirth, a new stage in the life of the city.

=== Quiet lake ===
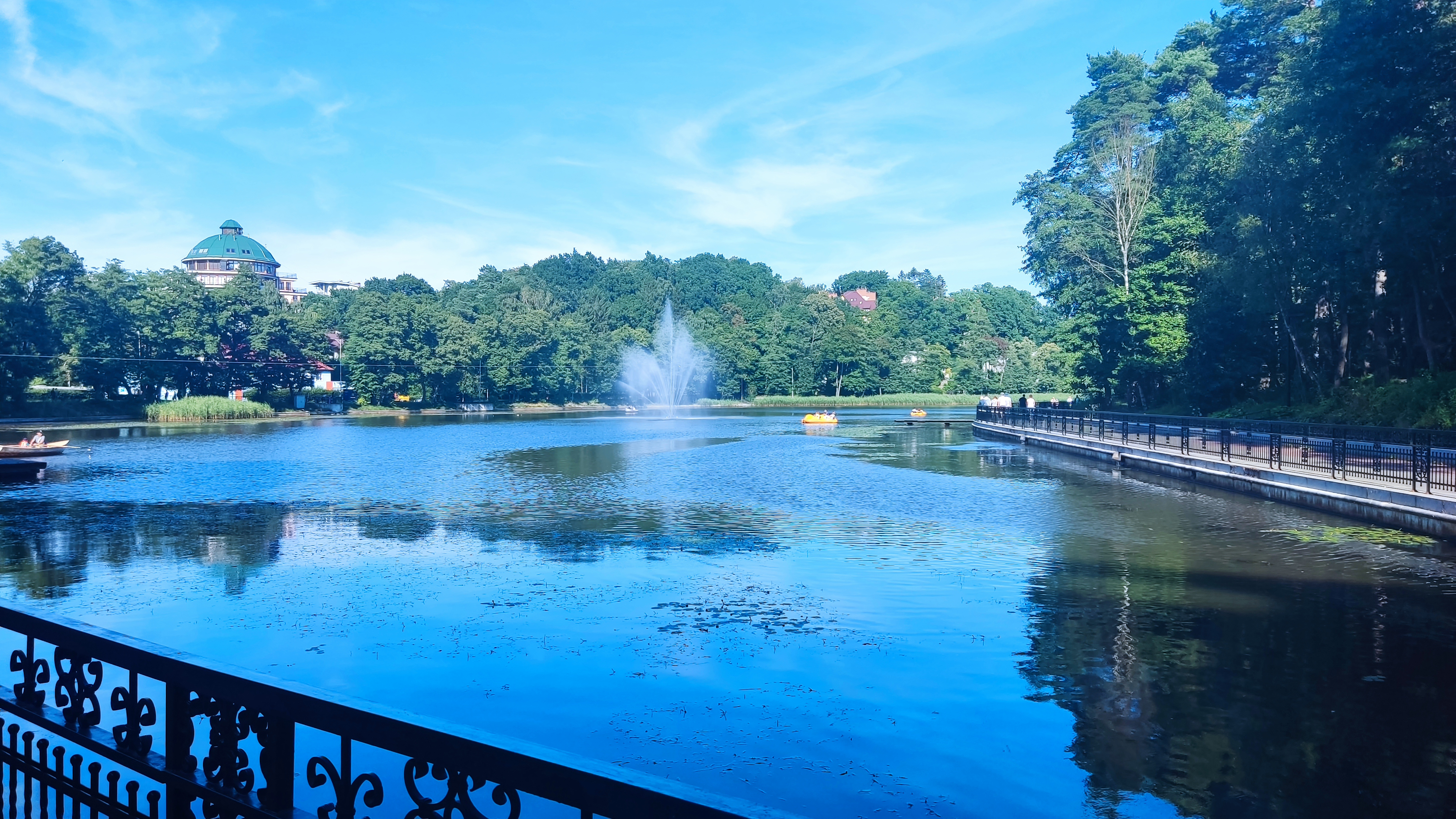
Quiet lake

The first vacationers came here for the sake of a mild therapeutic climate and settled on the shore of the Mullenteich pond – the current lake Tikhoe. They lived in the houses of local fishermen, enjoyed nature and occasionally climbed a sand dune to get to the sea water. In the middle of the 19th century, the first hotel and café were already opened near the lake, and soon they began to build up the current city center, where all the infrastructure was gradually moved. And the lake remained a quiet and peaceful corner with clean air and rich coastal vegetation.

=== Wheel of history ===
The exhibition-museum "Wheel of History" opened in Svetlogorsk on February 1, 2014, there is a permanent exhibition "Raushen – Svetlogorsk", telling about the history of the city.The exhibition presents cultural and everyday objects, rare photographs and other exhibits that tell about life, recreation, crafts and people who lived, created and loved this wonderful place on the Sambia Peninsula.

=== Cable car ===
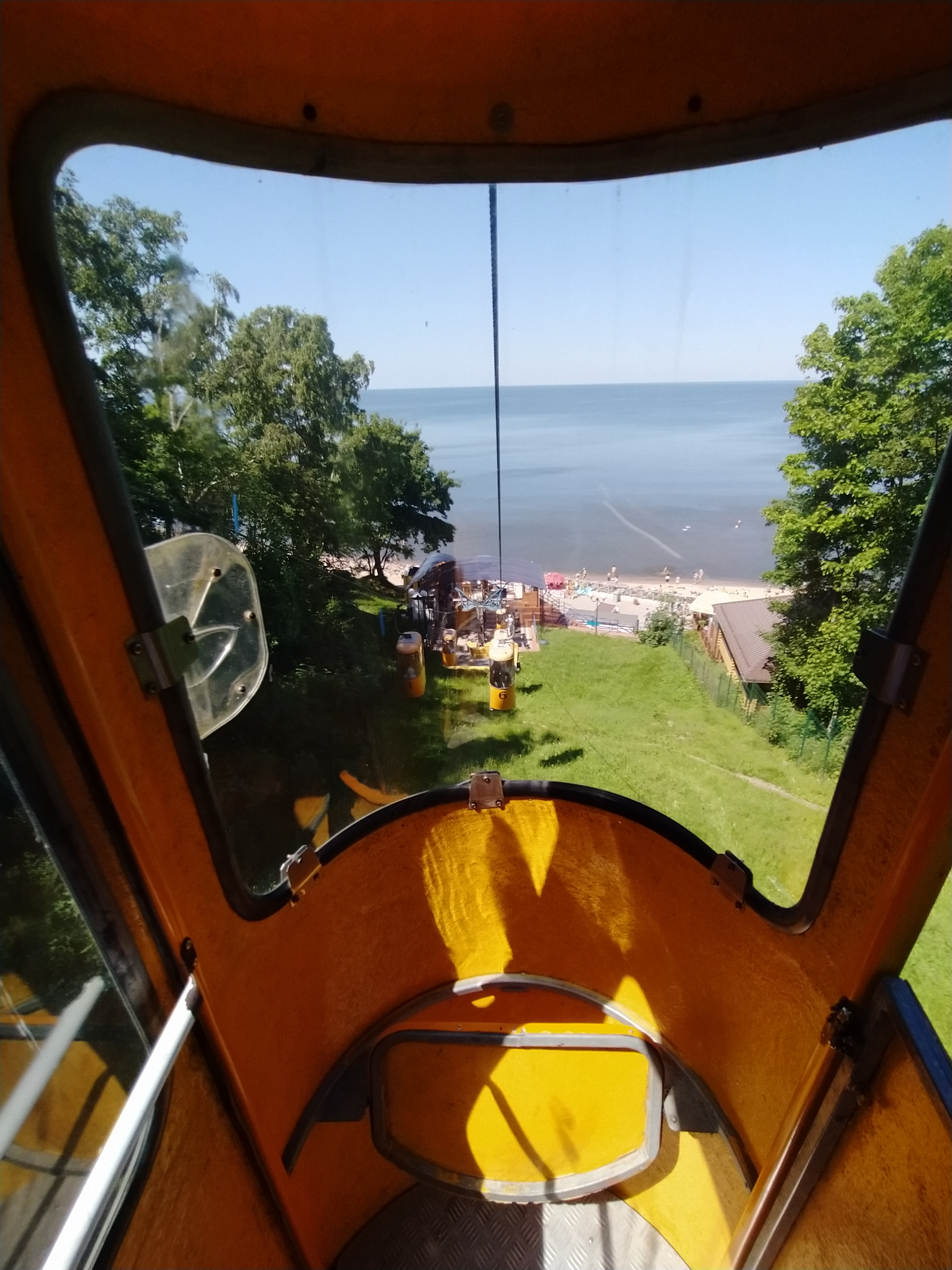
Cable car

The Svetlogorsk cable car is one of the main symbols of this resort city. With the help of it, you can climb from the sandy beach to the hills with the main urban infrastructure.The height difference in Svetlogorsk reaches 40 m, the descent and ascent are very steep. The funicular overcomes the 175 m long path in one direction in 5 minutes. The cabins are closed, each can withstand a weight of up to 160 kg. Usually there is a queue in front of the entrance, so it's worth getting ready to wait about 15 minutes.

== Transportation ==
The Svetlogorsk-1 and Svetlogorsk-2 stations of the Kaliningrad Railway are located in Svetlogorsk. These stations belong to two railway branches of the Kaliningrad – Pereslavskoye – Pionersky – Svetlogorsk-1 – Svetlogorsk-2 direct line and the Kaliningrad – Zelenogradsk – Pionersky – Svetlogorsk-1 – Svetlogorsk-2 rokadnaya line. At the peak of the popularity of Svetlogorsk in the 1980s, in the summer, every day, full-composite trains went from Kaliningrad to Svetlogorsk and back every 20 minutes, they traveled an average of 45 minutes, a ticket cost 35 kopecks, a travel ticket for a month – 2 rubles. 20 kopecks. Then many Kaliningrad residents, having bought a monthly travel ticket, went to the sea in the summer not only on weekends, but also after work: in the evening to sunbathe for a couple of hours-to swim. In 2013, in the summer, only nine 4-6-car trains a day plied from Kaliningrad (Yuzhny Railway Station) to Svetlogorsk and back, they travel an average of 1 hour. The Svetlogorsk — Zelenogradsk — Kaliningrad train runs once a day. This provides additional opportunities for lovers of high-quality and diverse beach holidays. There is a bus stop near the Svetlogorsk-2 train station, from which buses run to Kaliningrad, Otradnoye.

In August 2008, the construction of the Primorsky Ring highway began, which significantly shortened the way from Svetlogorsk to Khrabrovo Airport, about 30 km. In 2012, the Primorsky Ring was completed to Svetlogorsk and has a branch to Pionerskoye. Further construction of the Primorsky Ring in the direction of the Amber is frozen. The launch of the Primorsky Ring made it possible to unload the old German highway Svetlogorsk — Pereslavskoye — Kaliningrad, which had the fame of a very dangerous road. Despite the slightly longer length of the highway, 45 kilometers on the new road versus 35 kilometers on the old road, the permitted speed of 110 km/ h will significantly reduce the travel time to Kaliningrad. Two lanes in each direction and separated oncoming traffic make driving along the Primorsky Ring much safer and more enjoyable for drivers and passengers.

The city is connected by bus with Kaliningrad, Baltiysk, Zelenograd and Khrabrovo International Airport.

== International relations ==
Svetlogorsk is a member of Cittaslow.
