= Fastest trains in China =

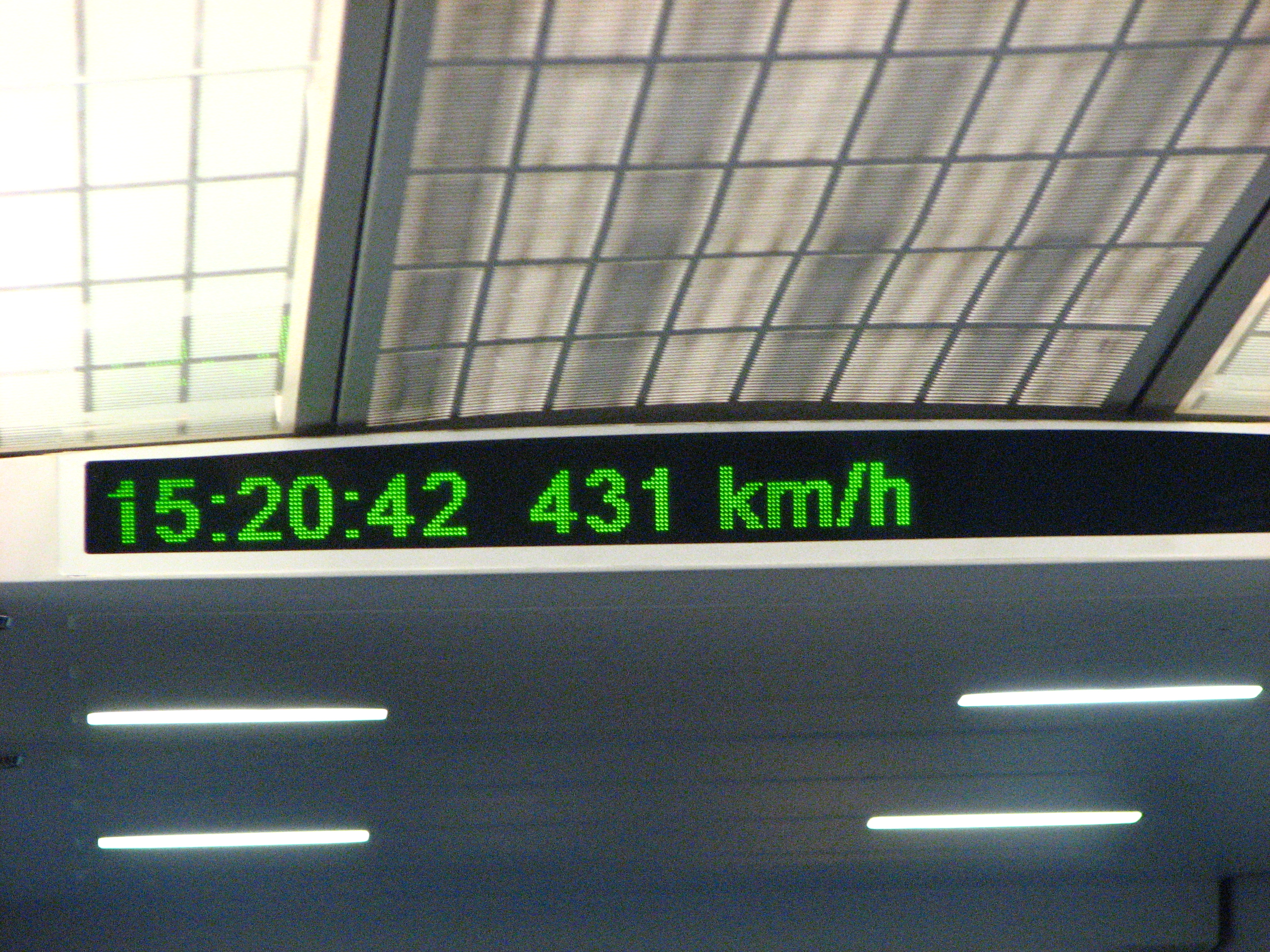
The Shanghai maglev train, at top speed of 431 km/h (268 mph), is the fastest train in China. The maglev train has remained confined its original 30 km (19 mi) track as state planners chosen high-speed trains that run on conventional track for the national HSR network.

The "fastest" train commercial service can be defined alternatively by a train's top speed or average trip speed.

- The fastest train service measured by peak operational speed was the Shanghai maglev train which can reach 431 km/h (268 mph). The maximum speed was limited to 300 km/h in 2021. Due to the limited length of the Shanghai Maglev track (30 km)(18.6 mi), the maglev train's average trip speed is only 245.5 km/h (152.5 mph).
- The fastest train service measured by average trip speed from 2009 until 2011 was on the Wuhan–Guangzhou high-speed railway, where from December 2009 until July 1, 2011, the CRH3/CRH2 coupled-train sets averaged 312.5 km/h (194.2 mph) on the 922 km (573 mi) route from Wuhan to Guangzhou North. However, on July 1, 2011 in order to save energy and reduce operating costs, the maximum speed of Chinese high-speed trains was reduced to 300 km/h, and the average speed of the fastest trains on the Wuhan-Guangzhou High-Speed Railway was reduced to 272.68 km/h (169 mph).
- After the speed reduction in 2011 the fastest services are found running between Shijiazhuang and Zhengzhou East where they achieve an average speed of 283.4 km/h (176.1 mph) in each direction in 2015.
- 350 km/h operation was restored in late 2017 with the introduction of Fuxing Hao trains for services running on the Beijing–Shanghai high-speed railway in late 2017 making the CRH network once again having the fastest operating speed in the world. Several services to complete the 1,302 km (809 mi) journey between Shanghai Hongqiao and Beijing South in 4 hours and 24 min or with an average speed of 291.9 km/h (181.4 mph) making it the fastest train service measured by average trip speed in the world.
- In 2019, the fastest timetabled start-to-stop runs between a station pair in the world are trains G17/G39 on the Beijing–Shanghai high-speed railway averaging 317.7 km/h (197.4 mph) running non-stop between Beijing South to Nanjing South before continuing to other destinations.
- The top speed attained by a non-maglev train in China is 487.3 km/h (302.8 mph) by a CRH380BL train on the Beijing–Shanghai high-speed railway during a testing run on January 10, 2011.

== Speed records of China's rolling stock (non-maglev) ==
Date	Train	Type	Track	Speed	Notes / Refs
1997-01-05	SS8	Electric locomotive	Beijing Circular Railway	212.6 km/h (132.1 mph)	(Note: SS8 locomotive with two passenger carriages)
1998-06-24	SS8	Electric locomotive	Jingguang Line	240 km/h (150 mph)	(Note: SS8 locomotive with five passenger carriages. It remains the recordholder for Chinese electric locomotives.)
1998-07-29	X 2000 "New Speed"	EMU	Guangshen Line	200 km/h (120 mph)	
1999-09	DDJ1 "Great White Shark"	EMU	Guangshen Line	223 km/h (139 mph)	
1999-10-01	NZJ1 "New Aurora"	DMU	Huning line	194 km/h (121 mph)	
2000-11	DJJ1 "Blue Arrow"	EMU	Guangshen Line	235 km/h (146 mph)	
2001-11-11	DJF2 "Pioneer"	EMU	Guangshen Line	249.6 km/h (155.1 mph)	
2002-09-10	DJF2 "Pioneer"	EMU	Qinshen PDL	292.8 km/h (181.9 mph)	
2002-11-27	DJJ2 "China Star"	EMU	Qinshen PDL	321.5 km/h (199.8 mph)	
2002-12-09	NZJ2 "Shenzhou"	DMU	Qinshen PDL	210.7 km/h (130.9 mph)	
2008-04-24	CRH2C	EMU	Jingjin ICL	370 km/h (230 mph)	(Note: CRH2-061C)
2008-06-24	CRH3C	EMU	Jingjin ICL	394.3 km/h (245.0 mph)	(Note: CRH3-001C)
2009-12-09	CRH3C	EMU	Wuguang PDL	394.2 km/h (244.9 mph)	(Note: The pair of CRH3 EMUs (CRH3-013C+CRH3-017C) also set a world record for double-link EMUs.)
2010-09-28	CRH380A	EMU	Huhang PDL	416.6 km/h (258.9 mph)	(Note: The CRH380A-6001 also holds the record for shorter length Chinese EMUs.)
2010-12-03	CRH380AL	EMU	Jinghu HSR	486.1 km/h (302.0 mph)	(Note: The CRH380A-6041L also holds the record for extended length Chinese EMUs.)
2011-01-09	CRH380BL	EMU	Jinghu HSR	487.3 km/h (302.8 mph)	(Note: The CRH380B-6402L Formation modified from 8M8T to 8M4T for the test.)
