= China Railway DJF2 =

Experimental electrical multiple unit of China

DJF2 "Xianfeng"
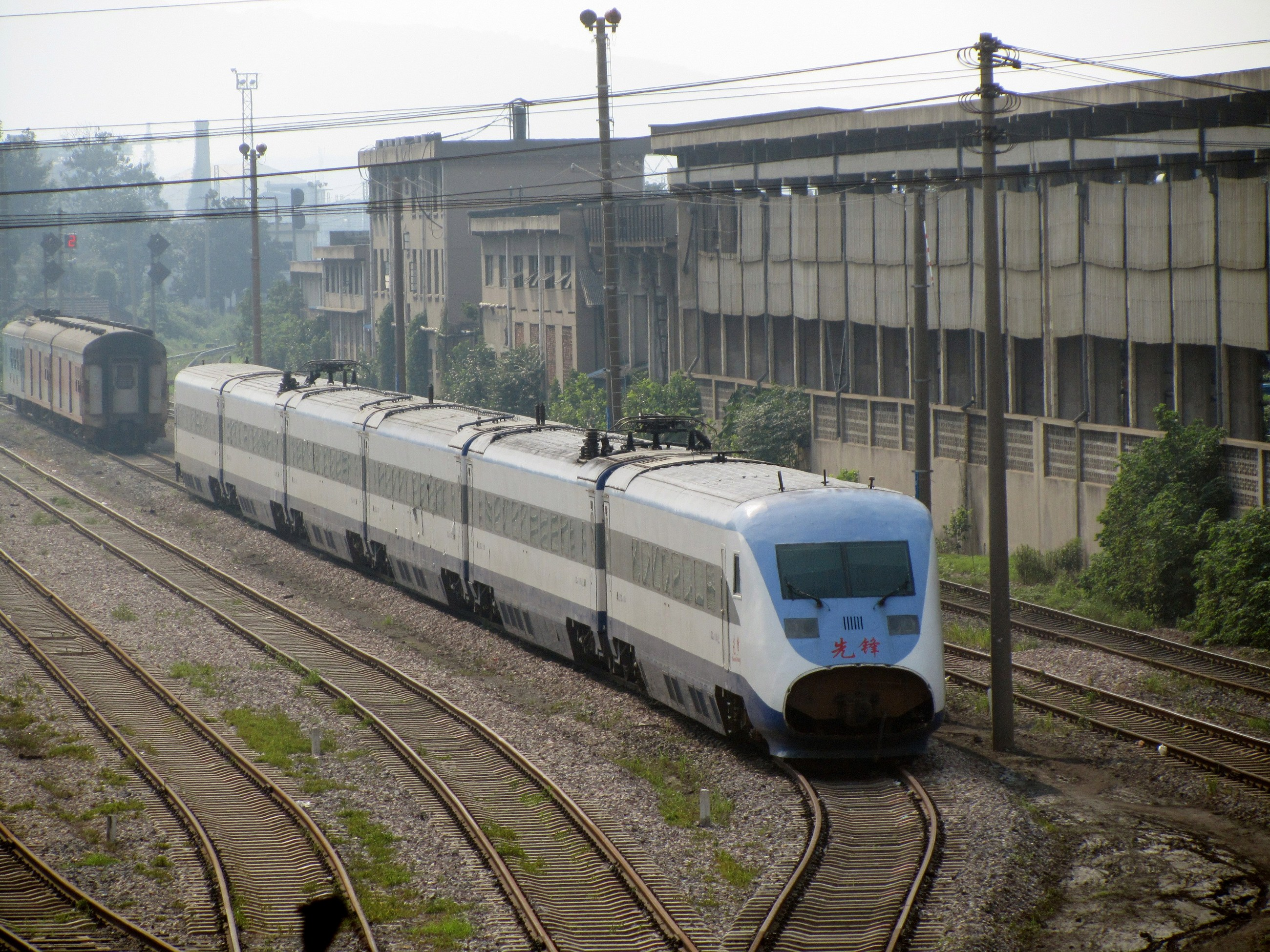
- The DJF2 while stored at CSR Nanjing Puzhen
- Manufacturer: CSR Nanjing Puzhen
- Built at: Nanjing, China
- Number built: 1 set (4M, 2T)
- Number in service: 0
- Predecessor: DJF1 "Zhongyuan Star"
- Successor: DJF3 "Mount Changbai" (in numbering series); CRH1 (in actual service)
- Formation: Mc-Tp-M-M-Tp-Mc
- Fleet numbers: see table
- Capacity: 424
- Operators: ~~China Railways~~; China Railway Guangzhou Group; China Railway Chengdu Group

Specifications
- Car body construction: welded steel, monocoque body
- Train length: 158.4 m (519 ft 8 in)
- Car length: 27 m (88 ft 7 in) (control cars); 25 m (82 ft 0 in) (other cars)
- Width: 3.1 m (10 ft 2 in)
- Height: 4 m (13 ft 1 in)
- Doors: 1 (driver cars)/ 2 (other cars) plug doors
- Wheel diameter: 915 mm (36.0 in) (new); 860 mm (34 in) (worn)
- Maximum speed: 160 km/h (99 mph) (service); 250 km/h (155 mph) (design); 292.8 km/h (181.9 mph) (tests)
- Weight: each car ≤58 t (57 long tons; 64 short tons)
- Axle load: 15 tons
- Traction system: Mitsubishi Electric MAP-304-A25V85 IGBT–C/I
- Traction motors: 16 × CRRC Zhuzhou Electric OEM JD106 300 kW (402 hp) 3-phase AC induction motor
- Power output: 4,800 kW (6,437 hp)
- Transmission: AC–DC–AC
- Acceleration: 0.41 m/s^{2} (0.92 mph/s) (starting)
- HVAC: air conditioning, electric heating
- Electric system(s): 25 kV 50 Hz AC overhead line
- Current collector(s): Pantograph
- UIC classification: Bo′Bo′+2′2′+Bo′Bo′+Bo′Bo′+2′2′+Bo′Bo′
- Bogies: PW-250M, PW-250T
- Braking system(s): regenerative braking, air brake, electro-pneumatic brake
- Coupling system: Tightlock coupler, size 15
- Track gauge: 1,435 mm (4 ft 8 1/2 in) standard gauge

The DJF_{2} "Xianfeng" (Note: DJF stands for: D–multiple unit; J–AC motor; F–power separated) electric multiple unit is a model operated formerly by China Railway with traction motors distributed throughout the unit. It was developed in 2001 as a key task of the science and technology targets of the Ninth Five-Year Plan. It was an innovative and advanced design being the first Chinese multiple unit train to achieve 200 km/h (124 mph) and achieving a top test speed of 292.8 km/h (181.9 mph) in tests, but had numerous flaws in the design that complicated operations.

== Developmental history ==
=== Background ===
Before the 1990s, the maximum speed at which services operated in China had long remained at 120 km/h (75 mph) or below, and faced increasingly steep competition from airplanes and highways. In 1990, the Ministry of Railways decided to upgraded the Guangshen railway to an experimentally higher speed section, with a speed of 160 km/h (99 mph), to explore various ways in which high-speed rail may be future developed. In December 1994, the upgraded Guangshen railway was put into service, which demonstrated the basics for future development of high-speed rail. After numerous experiments, the First railway speed-up campaign was launched on 1 April 1997.

To increase the competitiveness of the railways, the ministry set a target for a 200 km/h (124 mph) high speed EMU. In the Ninth Five-Year Plan, there were two such targets relating to the development of trainsets:

- 200 km/h (124 mph) passenger EMU (fulfilled by DDJ_{1})
- 200 km/h (124 mph) power separated AC EMU (fulfilled by DJF_{2})

=== Development ===
The "200 km/h (124 mph) power separated EMU" was designed with the participation of Nanjing Puzhen Rolling Stock, Tongji University, China Academy of Railway Sciences, CRRC Zhuzhou Institute, Datong Locomotive, Yongji Electric, Central South University, and some other minor companies, with Puzhen leading the design. Technological innovations that the set featured were the power and trailer bogies, the control system, the traction motors, traction transformers, the AC–DC–AC drive, gearbox, primary and auxiliary electronics, and some other components. The design was planned to operate at speeds between 160 and 200 km/h (99 and 124 mph), with a maximum speed of 250 km/h (155 mph).

The design of the set was completed at Puzhen in 1999, and submitted the plan for approval; construction began in August 1999. By June 2000, the overall structure was complete, and tests were undertaken on the high-speed bogies. Assembly was completed in December 2000, and the vehicle started running in, and it was accepted by the Ministry of Railways.

=== Trials ===
The DJF_{2} was rolled out from Puzhen on 23 May 2001, and was named "Xianfeng". Two days later, it arrived at the China Academy of Railway Science Beijing Ring railway to undergo comprehensive tests. From 1 August to 18 September, the "Xianfeng" performed safety tests at a speed of 160 km/h (99 mph). From 26 October to 16 November, it underwent testing under the watch of the ministry, China Railway Guangzhou Group, CSR, China Academy of Railways on the Guangshen railway for high speed testing. On the night of 10 November, the set broke the Chinese train speed record, hitting 249.6 km/h (155.1 mph). From December 2001 to June 2002, it underwent another half year of testing and adjustments on the Guangshen railway.

Between 2001 and 2002, before starting operation on the Qingshen passenger railway, the set underwent another three rounds of comprehensive testing, to check the safety of the new Qingshen railway, but also to provide experimental data for the Jinghu railway and to collect data on even higher speed trains of 300 km/h (186 mph). In the second such test from 5 to 12 September 2002, the "Xianfeng" collected various data on the traction, braking, behaviour at track switches, the effect on the pantograph at high speeds and the train warning system, while also testing the rails, switches, viaducts and signals of the new high speed line. On 10 September 2002, the train once again broke the Chinese speed record, reaching 292.8 km/h (181.9 mph) on the Qingshen railway.

After travelling 100,000 km (62,137 mi), the Ministry of Railway decided to expand the "Xianfeng" EMU from six to nine cars, and was listed as a task in the Tenth Five-Year Plan, which Puzhen took up, with their design being approved in March 2003. In June 2003, the "Xianfeng" was called back to Puzhen in preparations for modifications and expanding the consists. However, with the replacement of the Minister of Railways from Fu Zhihuan to Liu Zhijun, the developmental plans of China Railways changed, and the plans for expanding the consist was dropped. Afterwards, the ministry requested a 500,000 km (310,686 mi) run in instead, and after completing an overhaul, the "Xianfeng" started a passenger service trial service from 20 February 2004, until it completed its 500,000 km (310,686 mi) run-in on 19 October 2004. During this period, it ran twice daily from Huanggutun station to Shanhaiguan station with the service number 55201/2/3/4.

=== Service history ===
After the "Xianfeng" completed a 500,000 km (310,686 mi) run-in, it was stored in the Beijing Ring railway. On 19 December 2006, the ministry held a meeting to summarise the experiences from operating the "Xianfeng" EMU, where it was decided to return it to service as soon as possible, after it undergoes a repair. Subsequently, China Railways formally bought the train, and it underwent repairs in April 2007 at Puzhen; this was completed on 6 June, and it arrived at Chongqing on 8 June, and was assigned to Chengdu Bureau, Chongqing sector. There, it underwent trials on the Suiyu railway and the Dacheng railway, at speeds of over 170 km/h (106 mph).

From 7 July 2007, Chengdu Bureau used the "Xianfeng" to open a new service, T882/3 from Chongqing North station to Chengdu station and T884/1 with a maximum operating speed of 160 km/h (99 mph), taking 3 hours and 21 minutes for the trip. The tickets, however, were sold at the price of "D"-class services. On 8 September 2007, the "Xianfeng" suffered its first fault since its start of operation with the Chengdu Bureau, leading to the service being late by two hours. Between February and March 2008, when the "Xianfeng" underwent repairs, the services were instead carried out by DJJ1 "Blue Arrow" electric multiple units.

To improve the transportation efficiency of the Chenyu intercity trains, the timetable was adjusted on 21 December 2008, which allocated three of the five daily runs to two coupled DJJ1 sets, while the other two were standard double-deck locomotive hauled services. As a result, the "Xianfeng" was placed into service on the Yuhuai railway and Suiyu railway, running the T861/2 service from Chongqing North station to Fuling station and the T867/8 from Chongqing North station to Suining station, though T867/8 was cancelled from 1 April 2009 due to low passenger volumes. From 10 August 2009, the previous T861/2 service was cancelled, and it was assigned to T8863/4 from Chongqing North to Dazhou and Chengdu to Dazhou on service T8865/6 via the Xiangyu railway. It was again reassigned on 30 October, to run the T8875/6 from Chongqing North to Dazhou, and T8877/8 from Chengdu to Dazhou.

At the start of May 2010, the "Xianfeng" was reassigned to Guiyang sector, and put into use on the Qiangui railway; it restarted passenger service on 26 May 2010, from Guiyang to Duyun on T8871/2 and T8873/4 from Guiyang to Dushan, but only at 140 km/h (87 mph) due to the speed limits on the line. Its schedule was again changed from 1 July onwards, with the T8871/2 extended to run to Dushan, while T8873/4 was shortened to Duyun, along with the addition of service T8875/6 from Guiyang to Dushan. Due to a need for a factory repair, the three services were replaced by DJJ1 sets from 20 September, but instead of undergoing repairs, the set was parked at Nanjing North station, and its registration was removed in July 2014.

=== Preservation ===
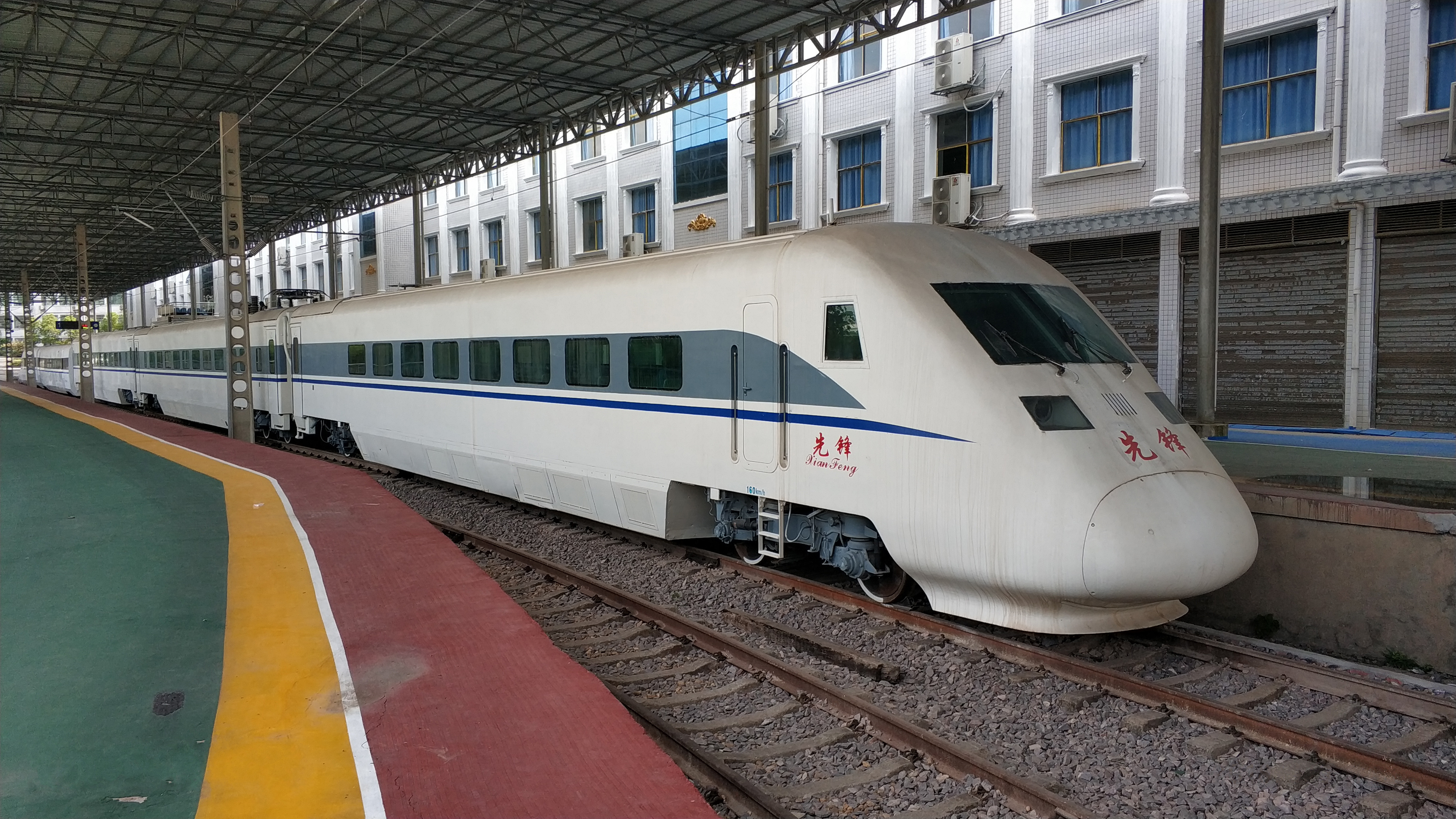
First three carriages of the "Xianfeng"

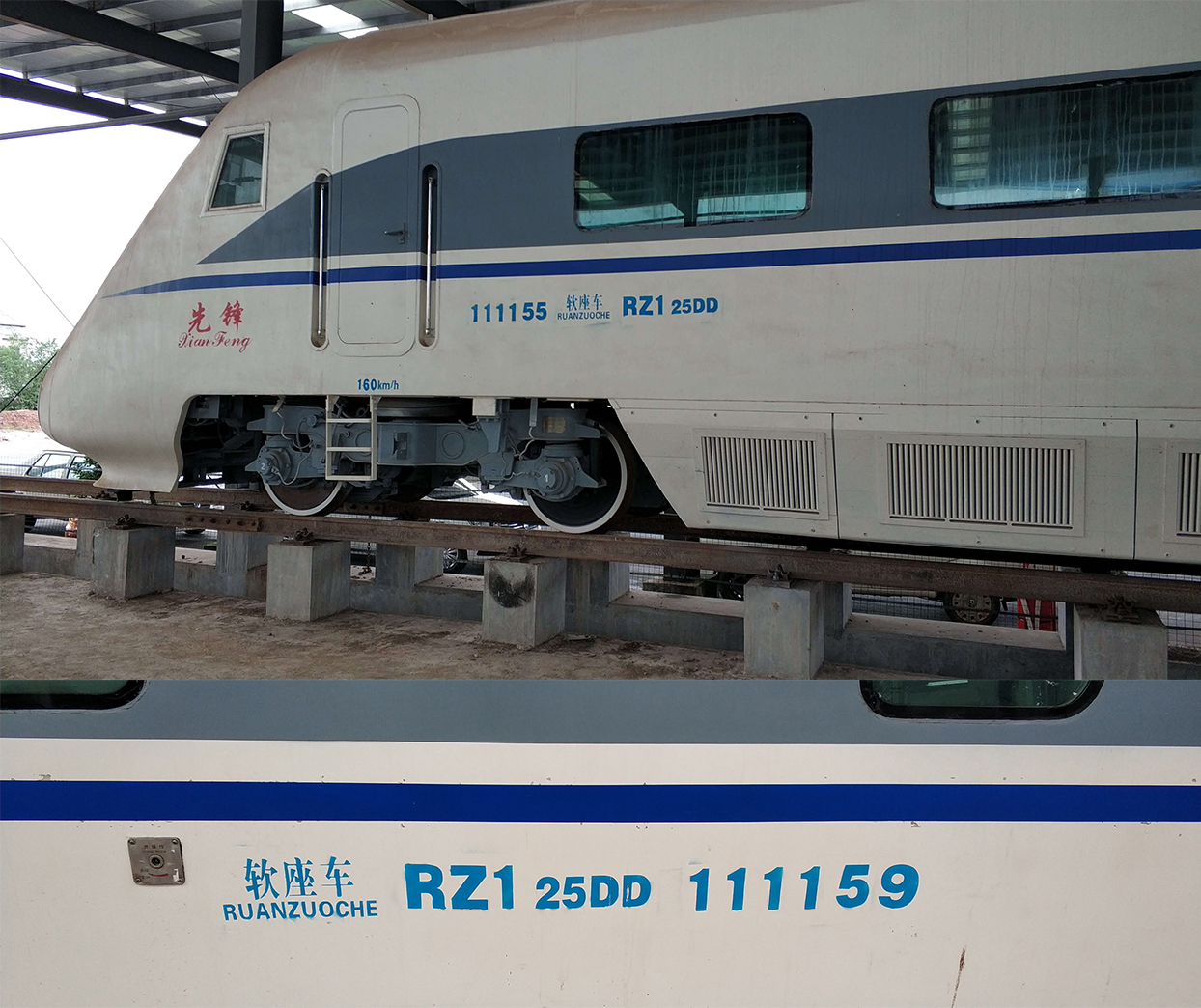
The carriage number has been incorrectly applied here.

The DJF_{2} "Xianfeng" is currently stored as two separate halves at the Hunan Institute of Traffic Engineering.

First section: RZ1_{25DD}111155-RZ2_{25DT}111158 (incorrectly painted as RZ2_{25DD}111158) (Note: 25DD is numbering for a motor; 111158 is a trailer, and should thus be 25DT)-RZ2_{25DD}111156

Second section: RZ2_{25DD}111154 (incorrectly painted as RZ1_{25DD}111154)-RZ2_{25DT}111159 (incorrectly painted as RZ1_{25DD}111159)-RZ2_{25DD}111157 (incorrectly painted as RZ1_{25DD}111157)

A new layer of paint was applied, without the original blue on the skirts, while an additional blue stripe was added along the side. Some of the numbers were incorrectly painted, and they were only painted along one side.

== Technical specifications ==
=== Overall structure ===
The DJF_{2} uses a power divided design, using the layout of the 300 Series Shinkansen as a base, with traction units comprising a trailer and two motors, with every set comprising two such traction units. The set has a total output of 4800 kW and a design speed of 200 km/h (124 mph). It is equipped with two model DSA200 pantographs, but uses only one in normal operation, with the second as reserve.

The car body uses a thin-wall, cylindrical monocoque fully welded design, with a streamlined head made of composite materials. The skirts along the undersides of the carriages are made from aluminium. Except for the driver's door, the doors are electrically actuated, piston operated plug doors.

=== Traction system ===
The DJF_{2} uses an AC–DC–AC transmission, with every traction unit having a trailer with a transformer, providing power to the two motor cars equipped with power inverters and traction motors. The supplied 25kV single phase AC is converted by primary transformers on the trailer cars, feeding to the traction converters on the two neighbouring motor cars. It first passes through a dual four-quadrant rectifier to become 2600 volt direct current, then converted by a pulse-width modulation type VVVF into three-phase alternating current, fed towards the four traction motors of each carriage.

The DJF_{2} uses Mitsubishi IPM-IGBT traction transformers, similar to the technology used on the E2 Series Shinkansen. The traction transformer comprises the four-quadrant rectifier, intermediate DC circuit and the PMW inverter, with an output is 3300V/1200A with water cooling. The traction motors are JD106 squirrel-cage three-phase motors, with an output of 300 kW each, which referenced the design of the 300 Series Shinkansen.

=== Auxiliary electrical system ===
The auxiliary windings on the traction transformers output 790V single-phase AC, which is then converted to 600V DC, and then converted by the three inverters under each carriage to 380V AC, for air conditioning, lighting and water boiling purposes. Another set of transformers under each trailer and non-driving motor lowers the voltage from 600V to 110V DC to power the control data link on the train.

The auxiliary electrical system was developed by Yongji Motor Factory, Beijing Jiaotong University and Tongji University. The subsystems developed included the cooling system for the traction motors, the 110V control system and the passenger electrical system. This design was a synthesis of the most advanced technology available in China at the time, such as the AC–DC–AC system, the linking of the air conditioning power to the auxiliary power and the auxiliary asynchronous three-phase motor. Each transformer has a fault monitoring system linked to it, able to provide diagnosis on the equipment.

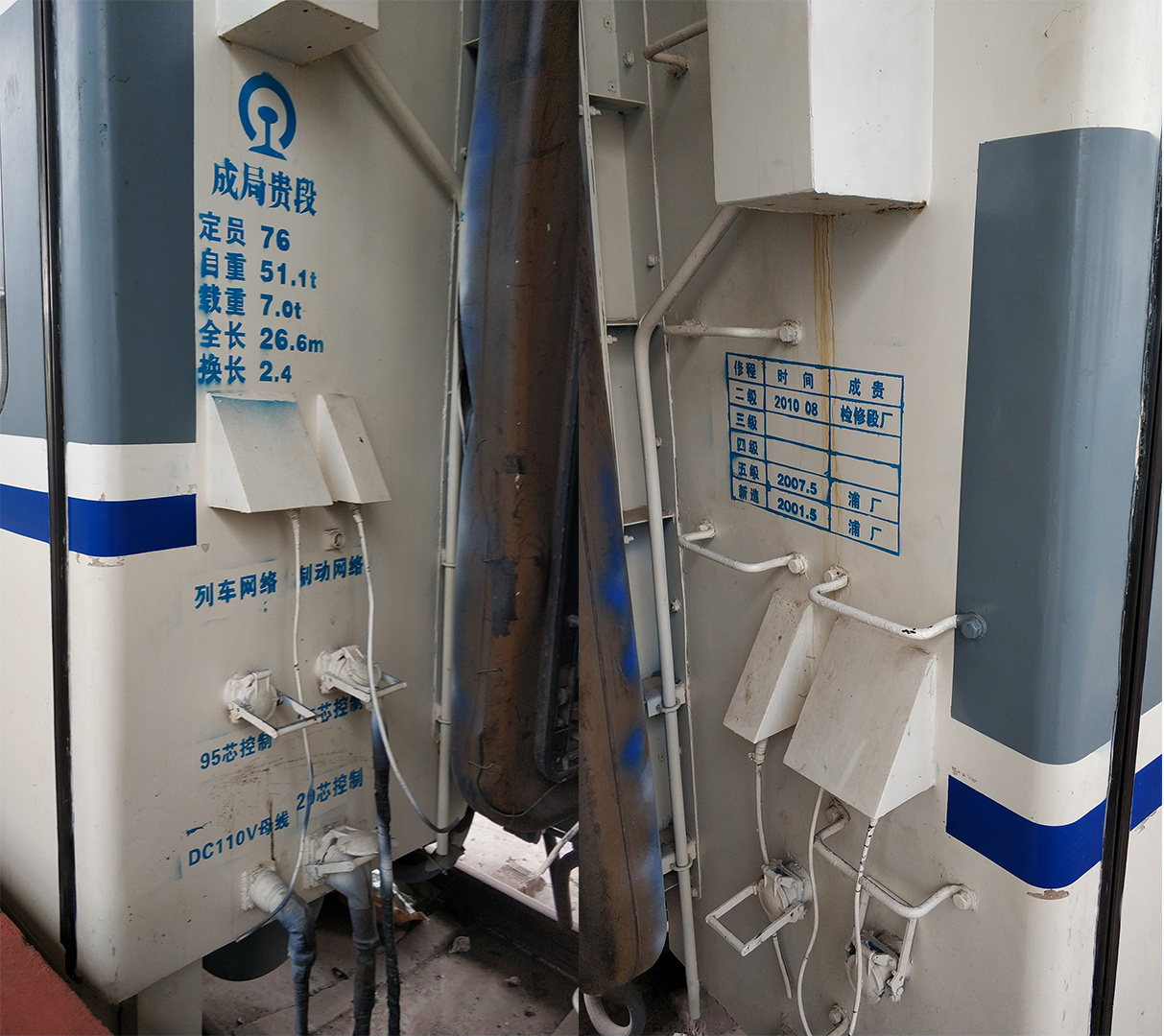
Car specifications. The two hanging cables are data links.

=== Control system ===
The DJF_{2} has a carriage communication, as well a set communication line. The set line is not responsible for control, and only for transmitting information on the operation of the train. The train communication network has a connection point for each carriage, and data is transmitted through a frequency-shift keying, dual shielded cable. Due to the train not using a distributed network, the cabling of the train was extremely complex.

=== Bogie ===
The DJF_{2} uses two types of two-stage bolsterless bogies, with motor cars using PW-250M and trailers using PW-250T. Apart from the lack of traction equipment and differences in the brakes where the trailer bogie has the disc brake fixed to the axle instead of the wheel, the overall structure is identical. The bogie is built from welded H beams. A bolsterless design was chosen, as in calculations, it showed a higher stability, especially at high speeds, with a lower coefficient of horizontal stability than vertical stability resulting in lower chance to derail at high speeds. Testing of the bogie provided recommendations for lowering the size of the wheel, to further reduce the weight of the bogie and release more space in the area of the bogie.

=== Flaws ===
The layout of the 300 Series Shinkansen proved poor in actual testing, with the train displaying insufficient adherence force in poor weather, such as rain and snow, and at gradients of around 12‰. This could be overcome in future designs, by building the train out of lighter materials and reducing the axle load, or rearranging the composition to provide a greater force on steeper gradients, although starting traction would be reduced. The transformer equipment on the trailer cars was a possibility for improvement; its weight of 6.1 tons brought the weight of the trailer car almost up to the weight of a motor car, at 15 tons. Due to quality issues of the piping and valves of the transformer oil, it would often leak onto the transformers during testing. The risk of this was made worse by the lower profile of the car, which meant the surface area of the cooling system was increased. It posed a safety risk, as it was impossible to check whether oil was leaking into the transformer while the train was in motion. The positioning of the cooling inlet for the transformer was found to be inappropriate, as dust from near the tracks would tend to block the filter, causing the transformers to operate at high temperatures.

While the IPM was able to output some diagnosis information over the RS-485 standard data link, most of the faults had to be viewed on the module itself, unnecessarily complicating maintenance, even though the installed processors were able to handle the information. Nonetheless, the FSK required improvements, as it became a bottleneck in train control due to the low bandwidth, and the data loggers were unable to copy out particular errors and had insufficient memory to store all errors, meaning it was hard to perform diagnosis, management and maintenance. To comply with different signalling standards, the train was fitted with two different kinds of automatic train protection, wasting the storage of the computer systems on board.

In earlier tests, the motors had failure rates of up to 40%. While the gearbox was found to work normally, the motor had defects, with it sometimes not behaving properly when the train was in idle, damaged bearings on the non-driving axles and burning of the motor, which led to damage on the couplers when it was subject to unequal forces. Eventually, this was mostly solved by using higher quality lubricants and using steel with higher hardness.

In September 2009, it was discovered that one of the driving motors, RZ1_{25DD}111155 had excessive vibrations, particularly when travelling at between 120 and 130 km/h (75 and 81 mph). This was uncomfortable for passengers, and was a safety risk, as the vibrations could cause screws to become loose, and fall off. It was discovered to be because of excessive wear on the wheels, causing it to no longer be an acceptable circle. The cause of the excessive damage to the wheel was likely a failure to perform regular checks on the wheels, and to monitor their deformities.

=== Train composition ===
Exterior	Original paint						
Exterior	Newer paint						
Carriage position		1	2	3	4	5	6
Car registration	Old registration	XYZ 001	XYZ 002	XYZ 003	XYZ 004	XYZ 005	XYZ 006
Car registration	New registration	RZ1_{25DD}111155	RZ2_{25DT}111158	RZ2_{25DD}111156	RZ2_{25DD}111157	RZ2_{25DT}111159	RZ2_{25DD}111154
Technical features	Model	RZ1_{25DD}	RZ2_{25DT}	RZ2_{25DD}		RZ2_{25DT}	RZ2_{25DD}
Technical features	Traction	●● ●●	〇〇 〇〇	●● ●●		〇〇 〇〇	●● ●●
Technical features	Traction unit	①			②		
Technical features	Power configuration	Mc	Tp	M		Tp	Mc
Technical features	Axle arrangement	Bo′Bo′	2′2′	Bo′Bo′		2′2′	Bo′Bo′
Technical features	Main features	driver's cabin traction transformer traction motor	pantograph primary transformer	air compressor traction transformer traction motor		pantograph primary transformer	driver's cabin traction transformer traction motor
Technical features	Bogie	PW-250M	PW-250T	PW-250M		PW-250T	PW-250M
Passenger amenities	Carriage class	first class "soft seat" (2+2)	second class "soft seat" (2+2)				
Passenger amenities	Features	toilet × 2 water boiler switch room cleaner's room	toilet × 2 water boiler switch room cleaner's room conductor's room				AV control room water boiler telephone service switch room snacks bar
Passenger amenities	Rated capacity	56	76				64

== See also ==
- DDJ1 "Great White Shark"
- DJJ1 "Blue Arrow"
- DJJ2 "China Star"
- 300 Series Shinkansen
