= China Railway CR200J =

Chinese higher-speed trainset

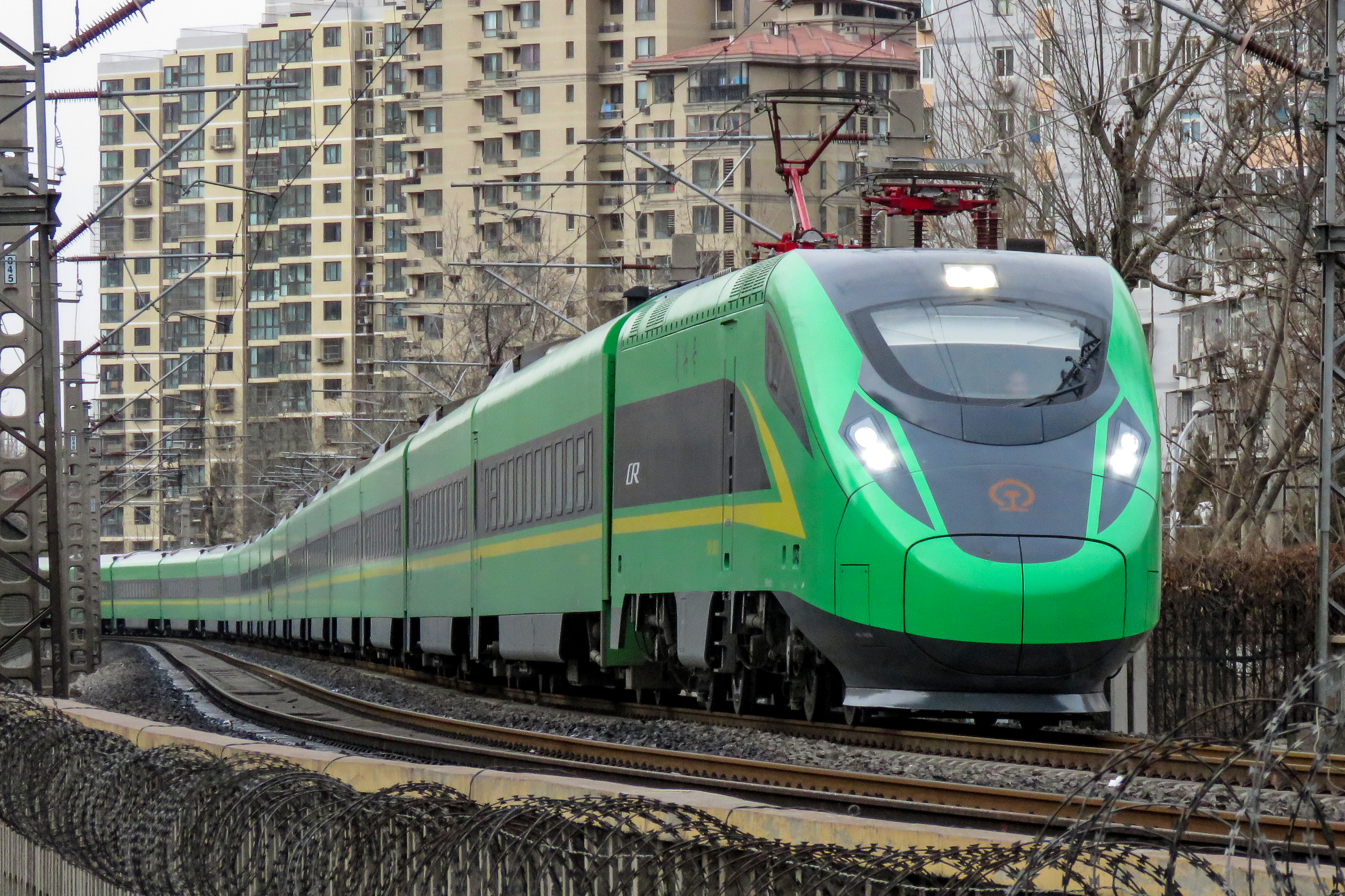
- FXD1-J0010 as service D712 on Beijing-Shanghai railway
- Manufacturers: CRRC Nanjing Puzhen; CRRC Qingdao Sifang; CRRC Tangshan; CRRC Zhuzhou Locomotive; CRRC Datong; CRRC Dalian
- Family name: Fuxing
- Constructed: 2017–present
- Entered service: January 2019
- Number built: 144 sets (101 short, 40 long); 195 power cars, 1483 trailer cars
- Formation: Mc+7T+Tc; Mc+16T+Mc; Mc+9~16T+Mc
- Capacity: Short sets: 720; Long sets: 1102
- Operators: China Railway; Laos–China Railway Company Limited; Malaysia Rail Link Sdn Bhd & CCCC Joint Venture

Specifications
- Train length: Short sets:234 m (767 ft 9 in); Long sets: 518 m (1,699 ft 6 in)
- Car length: Power car: 20 m (65 ft 7 in); Intermediate car: 25.5 m (83 ft 8 in); Control car:27,955 mm (91 ft 8.6 in)
- Width: 3,105 mm (10 ft 2.2 in)
- Height: 4,433 mm (14 ft 6.5 in)
- Wheelbase: 2.8 m (9 ft 2 in)
- Maximum speed: 160 km/h (99 mph) (Service); 180 km/h (112 mph) (Design); 210 km/h (130 mph) (Power car only)
- Weight: 445t (7T formation); 1164t (16T formation)
- Traction system: FXD1-J:Zhuzhou CRRC Times Electric or CRRC Yongji Electric water-cooled IGBT–VVVF; FXD3-J:Toshiba/CRRC Yongji Electric water-cooled IEGT–VVVF
- Traction motors: FXD1-J, HXD1D-J:CRRC Zhuzhou Electric permanent magnet synchronous motor FXD3-J:Toshiba/CRRC Yongji Electric YJ-277B/YJ-277C open inner-fan cooled 3-phase AC induction motor
- Power output: Powercars: 5,600 kW (7,510 hp)
- Electric system: 25 kV 50 Hz AC (nominal) from overhead catenary
- Bogies: Bolsterless air spring SW-220K (Tangshan trailer); CL-242K (Puzhen trailer)
- Braking systems: Regenerative braking, electro-pneumatic composite braking system
- Safety system: CTCS2-200H/C
- Track gauge: 1,435 mm (4 ft 8 1/2 in) standard gauge

The CR200J Fuxing (Chinese: 复兴号; pinyin: Fùxīng Hào) is a Chinese trainset consisting of a power car paired with unpowered passenger cars operated by China Railway. It is the slowest member of the Fuxing series, and only member of Fuxing series designed for existing railways under 200km/h rather than newer high-speed railways. The train was jointly designed and produced by six companies under CRRC.

The units are nicknamed Green EMU or Hulk by the Chinese media, or "trash can" and "A&D calcium milk" (for 3rd generation CR200J-C units produced from 2023 onwards) among the railfan community due to their green appearance and a resemblance to a Wahaha drink of the same name, respectively.

== Design and development ==
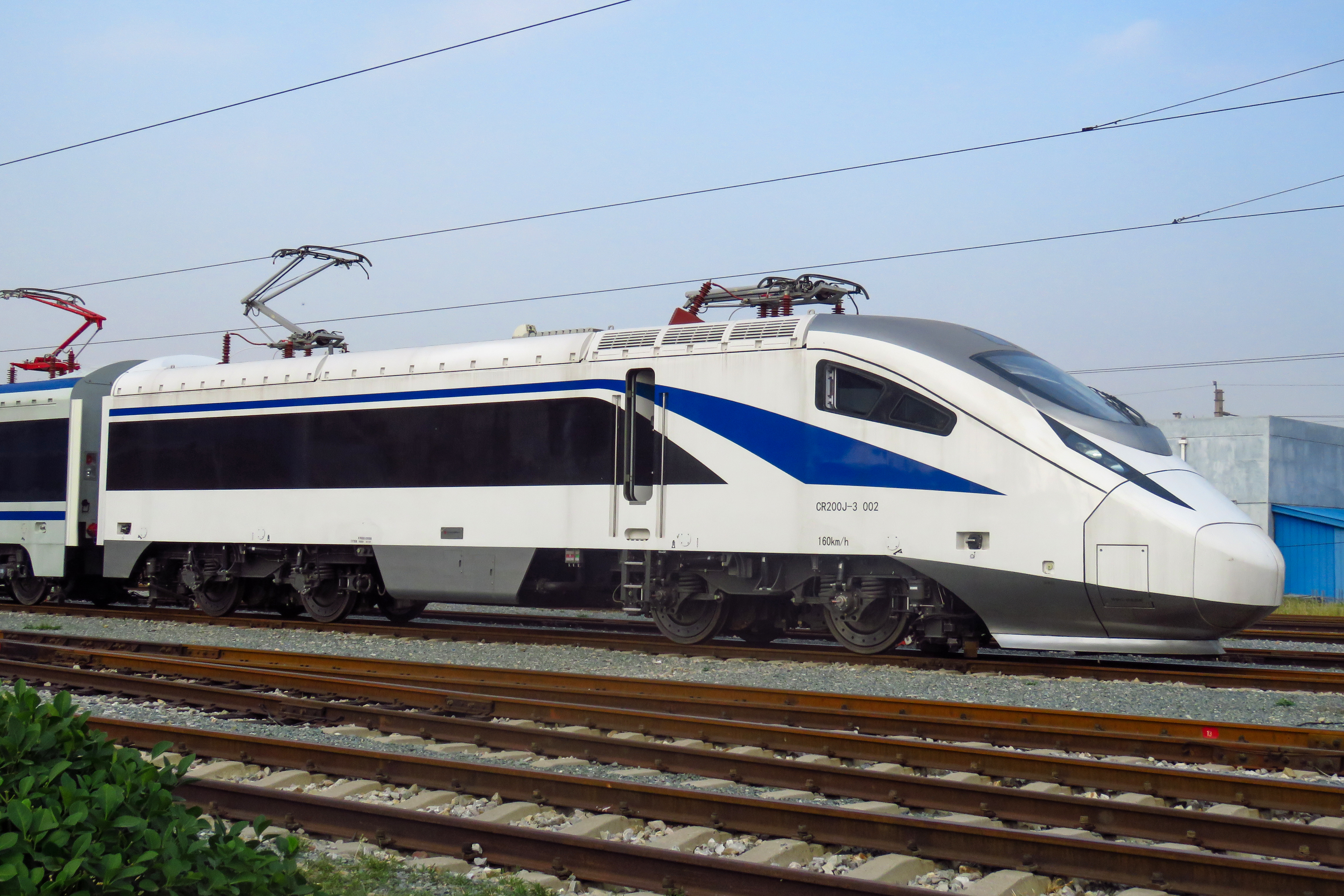
CR200J-3002 during testing

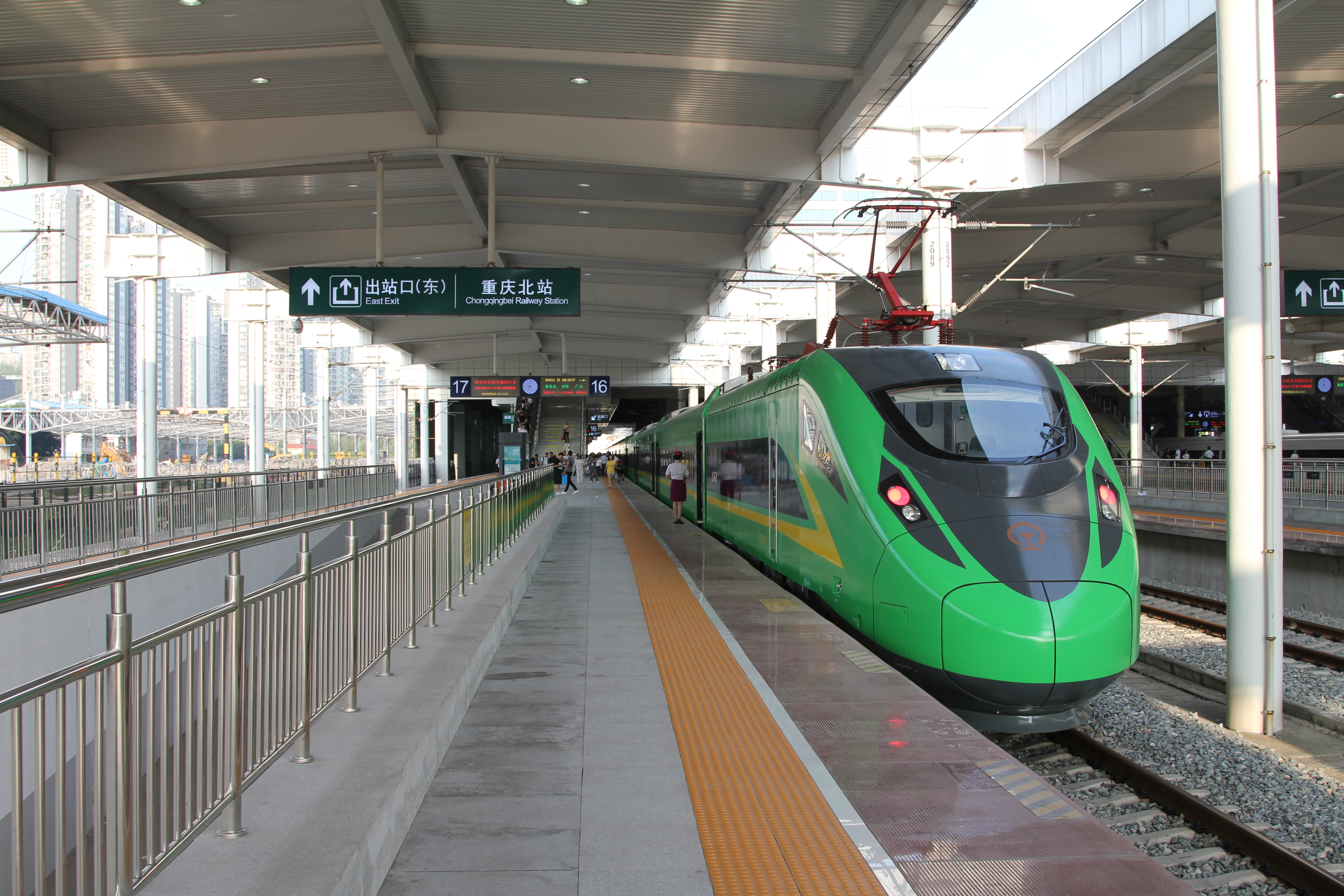
CR200J-1009 at Chongqing North railway station

The development of CR200J was initiated by China Railway Corporation to create more affordable, economical, and efficient high-speed rail. Development started on 28 August 2015, and by 27 April 2017, initial prototypes had entered testing. Multiple trainsets were sent to the China Railway Chengdu Group for dynamic testing on the Chengdu–Chongqing railway, Chongqing–Lanzhou railway, and Chongqing–Guiyang high-speed railway between 17 December 2017 and 4 January 2018. There are multiple variants of the CR200J series made by different subsidiaries of the state-owned China Railway, and these variants are required to follow the China Standardized EMU design philosophy, thus ensuring that every variant of CR200J is compatible to each other. Another round of testing was finished on 5 August 2018. On 5 January 2019, China Railway announced several new service lines, and the CR200J was formally put into service.

CR200J shares similar transmission and motor system with other Fuxing series trainsets, despite the lower operating speed. All CR200J trainsets are painted in a green livery, reminiscent of China's previous generation green-skinned train. The interior design follows the design language of CR400 Fuxing EMU trains, and are fitted with individual power outlets, Wi-Fi connectivity, and larger legroom.

On the Sichuan–Tibet railway, the plateau variant of the China Railway CR200J, the CR200JS-G electro-diesel multiple unit specifically designed for plateau operations with weather resistance is used. A combination of diffusion and distributed oxygen systems are installed to help alleviate altitude sickness for passengers on the trip.

== Variants ==
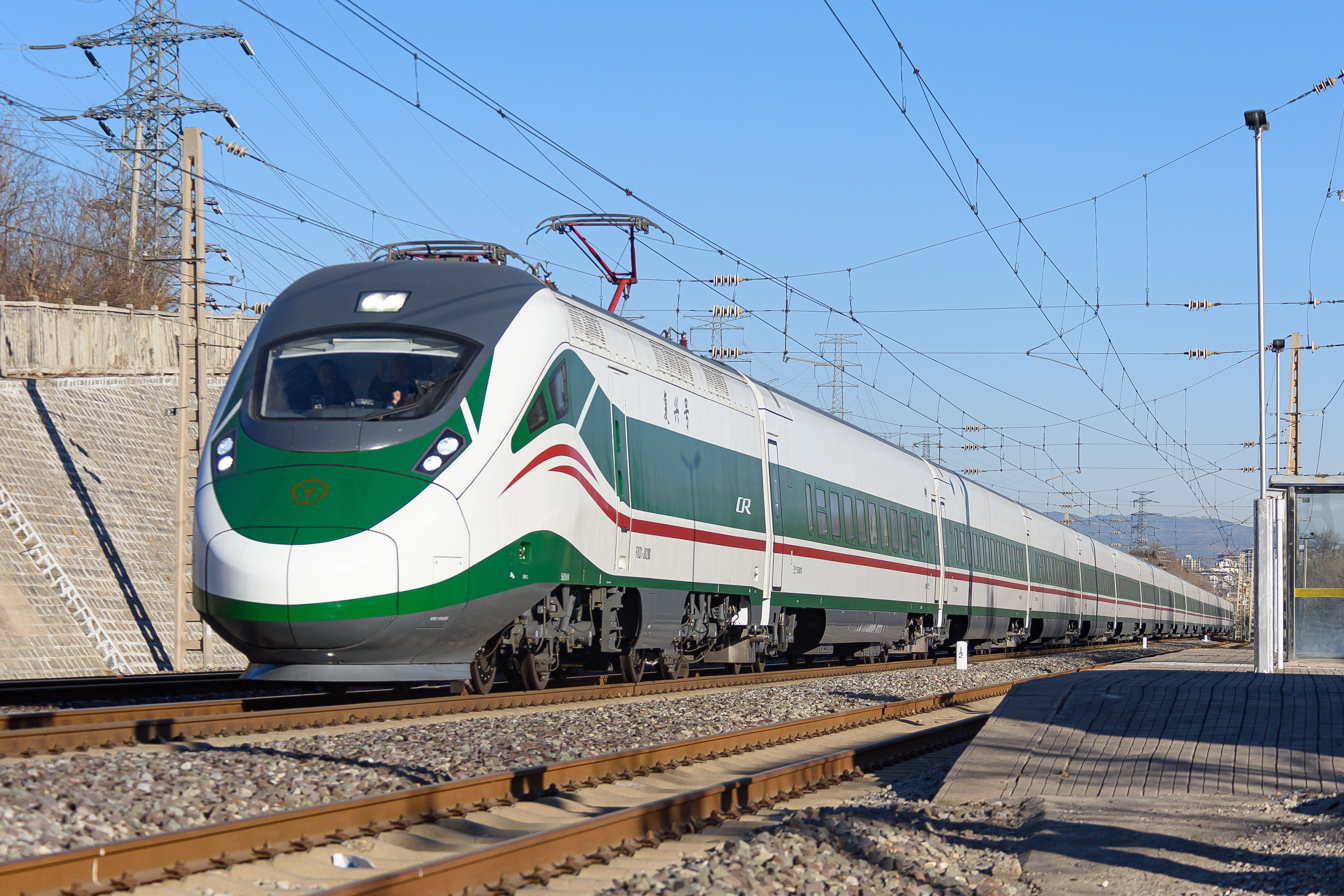
CR200J-C series with revised livery

- FXD1-J: Electric locomotive with two-axle bogies manufactured by CRRC Zhuzhou Locomotive and CRRC Datong.
- FXD3-J: Electric locomotive with two-axle bogies manufactured by CRRC Dalian.
- HXD1D-J: Electric locomotive with three-axle bogies manufactured by CRRC Zhuzhou Locomotive for plateau operation, as part of the CR200JS-G electro-diesel multiple unit and electric multiple unit CR200J1-D
- FXN3-J: Diesel-electric two-unit locomotive with three-axle bogies manufactured by CRRC Dalian for plateau operation as part of the CR200JS-G electro-diesel multiple unit.
- 25TB coaches: Specially designed 25T coaches with driver-controlled doors.

=== Export ===
11 six-car CR200J trainsets are expected to enter service on Malaysia's East Coast Rail Link in 2027.

== Equipment issues ==
In its initial operation period, the CR200J variant manufactured by CRRC Dalian had a high rate of failure. A malfunction in the engine system caused the train to slow down and stop. Out of the 23 EMUs produced by CRRC Dalian, 12 of them have broken down before 1 June 2019. According to a China Business Journal, the maintenance department of the manufacturer was held accountable for the failures. In response, CRRC Dalian cut salaries by 20% and recalled their trainset for repairs and upgrades.

== Controversy ==
The Fuxing CR200J EMU has been controversial since it was put into operation, especially among railway enthusiasts. The controversy mainly focuses on the fact that, compared with existing "Z" (non-stop express) trains with 25T coaches, the travel experience and speed have not significantly improved in spite of the noticeably higher ticket prices in comparison. Furthermore, a number of previous Z and T trains were permanently cancelled in favour of D trains ran using the Fuxing CR200J. These D trains still run according to the schedules of the discontinued trains, thereby effectively replacing these more affordable journeys.

Moreover, the external livery is regarded as aesthetically displeasing by some rail enthusiasts, and the reliability issue has also led to further controversy.

== Formation ==
Power Destination

- M – Motor car
- T – Trailer car
- C – Driver cabin
- P – Pantograph

Coach Type

- SW_{16AX} – Business Class Coach (only available in CR200JS-G with 3M12T expanded formation)
- ZYS_{16AX} – First Class/Business Class Coach (only available in CR200JS-G)
- ZY_{25T/16AX} – First Class Coach
- KZ_{25T/16AX} – Coach with Control Cab
- ZE_{25T/16AX} – Second Class Coach
- ZEC_{25T/16AX} – Second Class Coach/Dining Car
- WY_{25T/16AX} – First Class Sleeping Coach
- WE_{25T/16AX} – Second Class Sleeping Coach
- WG_{25T} – Luxury Sleeping Coach
- WEX_{25T/16AX} – Second Class Sleeping Coach with Baggage
- 25TA/16AA are Tangshan/Sifang/Changke platform trailers, 25TB/16AB are Puzhen platform trailers, and CR200Jx-C, CR200J1-D, and CR200Jx-N are equipped with 6 business seats.

=== Short formation (1st and 2nd generation) ===
- Applicable models: CR200J1-A (short train), CR200J2-A, CR200J3-A (short train), CR200J1-B, CR200J2-B, CR200J3-B, LCR200J3-B (0401, 0402)

Coach No.	M	1	2	3	4	5	6	7	8
Type	CR200J-xxxx 00; FXDx-Jxxxx	ZE			ZEC	ZE			KZ
Power Configuration	Mc	T							Tc
Capacity	/	98			76	98			56

- Car 8 is First-Class coach with control cab

=== Short formation (3rd generation) ===
- Applicable models: CR200J1-C (short train), CR200J3-C (short train), CR200J1-D (electric high-altitude type), CR200J1-N (internal electric hybrid short train), CR200J3-N (internal electric hybrid short train).

=== Dual-source high-altitude plateau ===
- Applicable models: CR200JS-G

=== Long formation (1st generation) ===
- Applicable models: CR200J1-A (long trainset) and CR200J3-A (long trainset).

=== Long formation (3rd generation) (18 cars) ===
- Applicable models: CR200J1-C (18-car train), CR200J3-C (18-car train).

=== Long formation (3rd generation) (19 cars) ===
- Applicable models: CR200J3-C (19-car train)

== Gallery ==
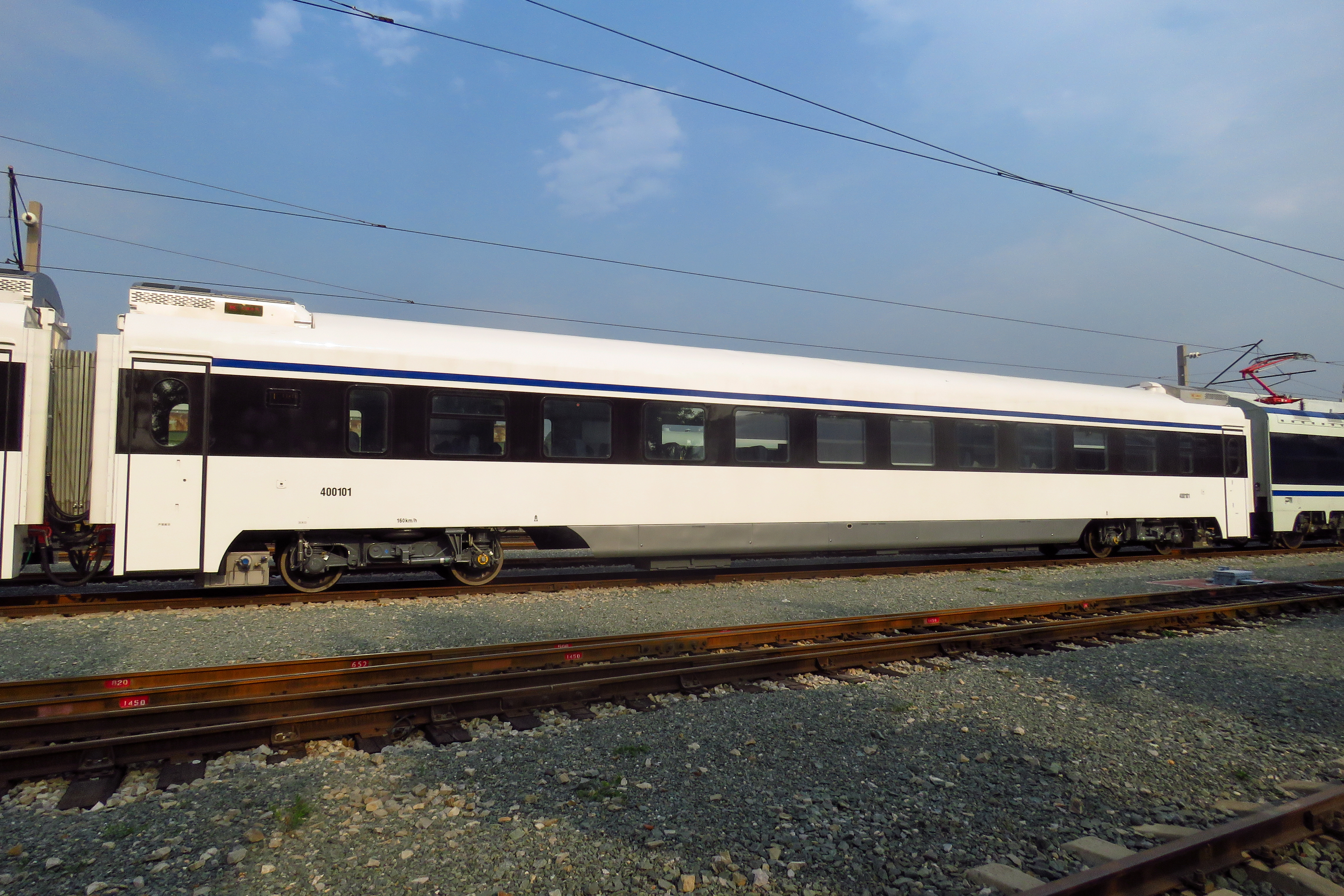
Exterior of the 25T coaches

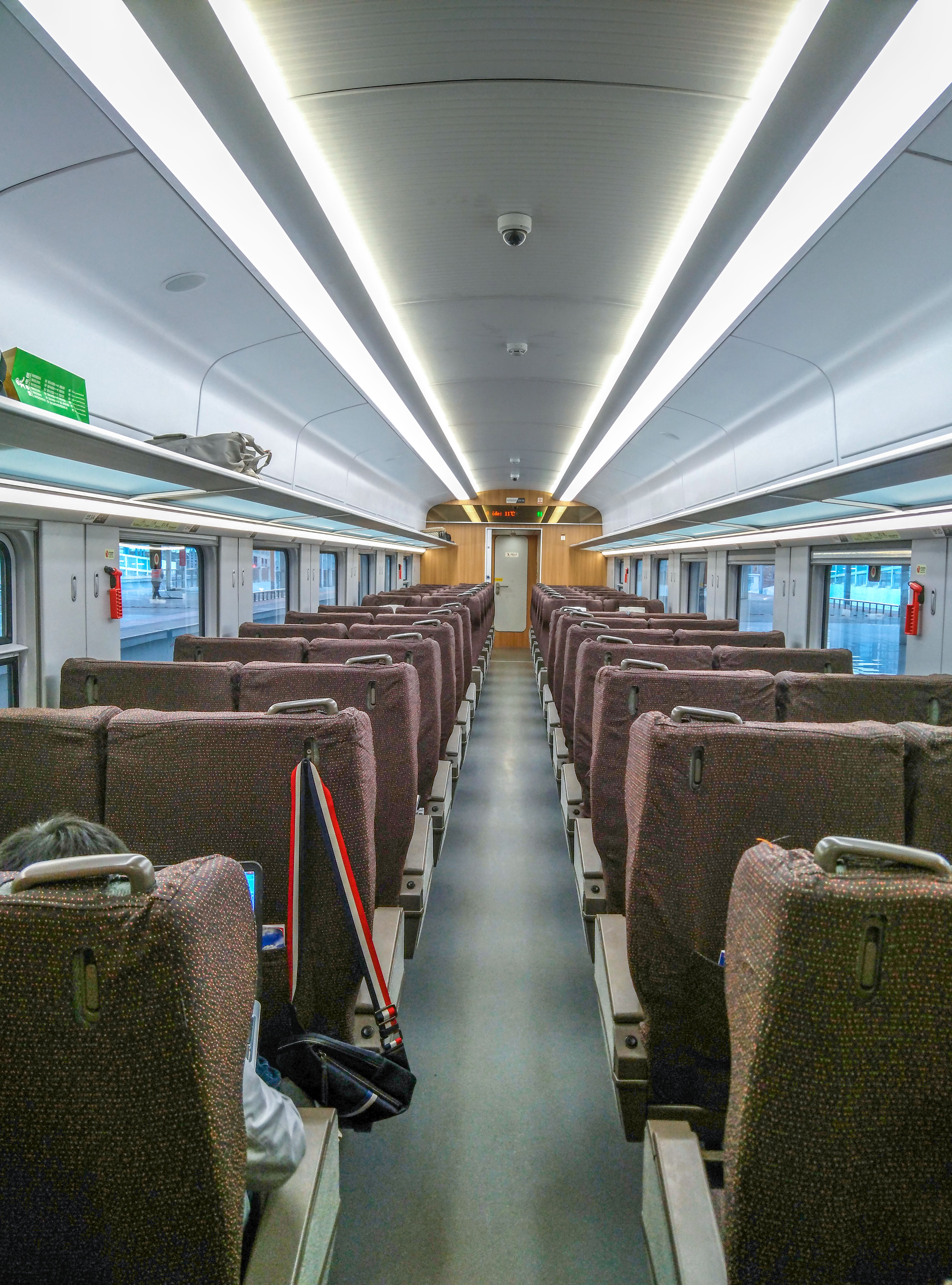
First class interior

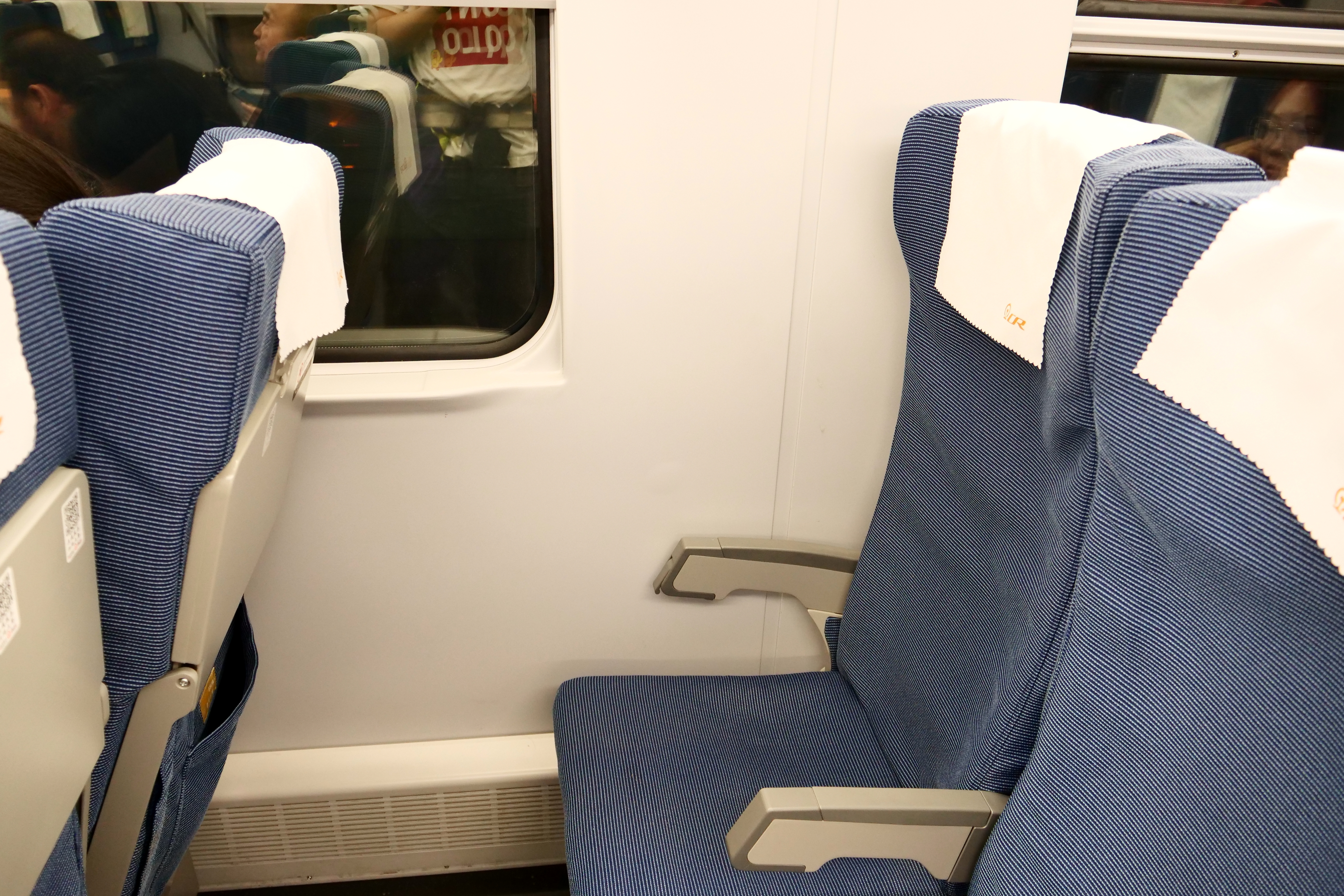
CR200J second class seats

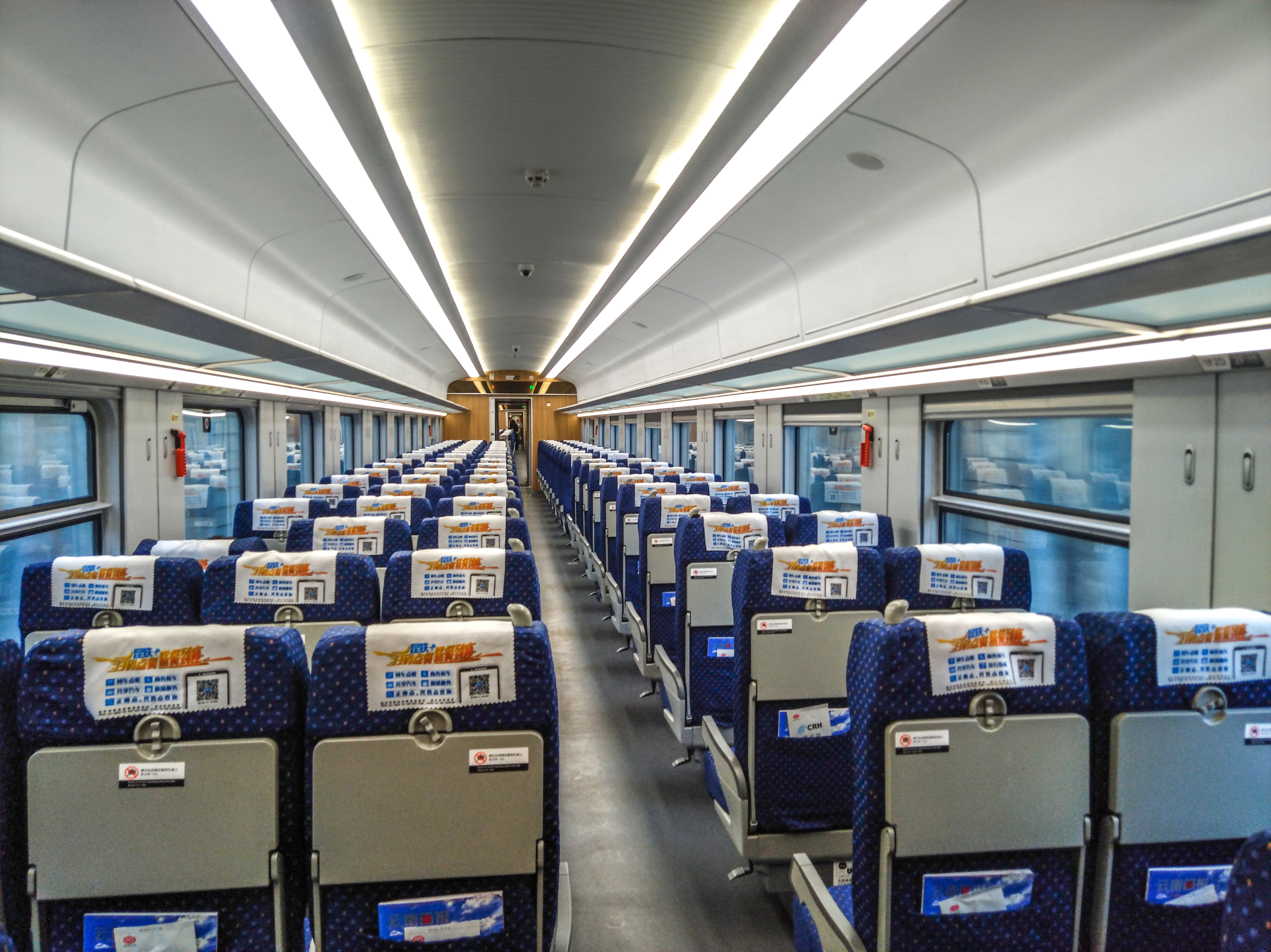
Second class interior

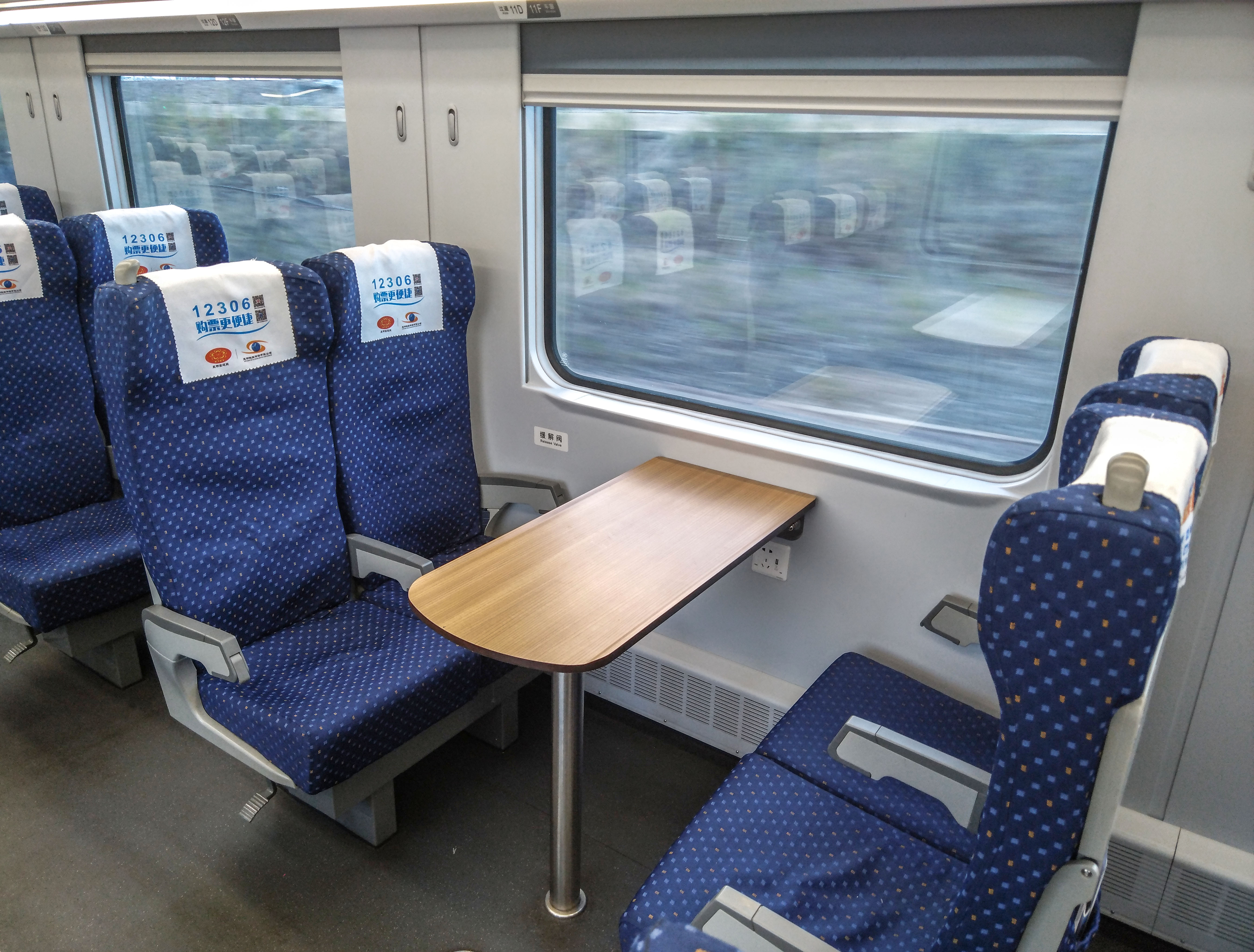
The table seats located at the center of second class cars

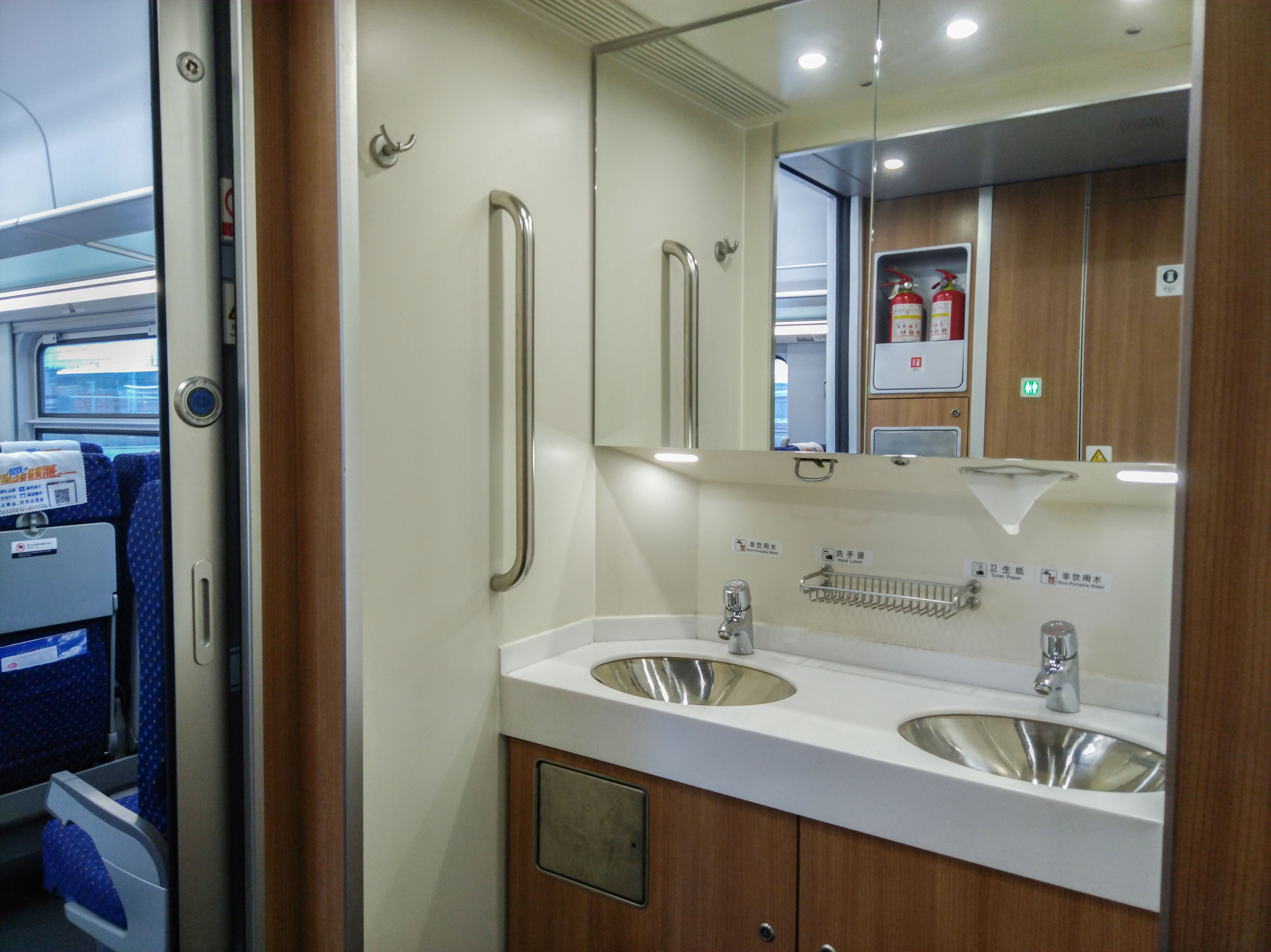
Washbasin and automatic door

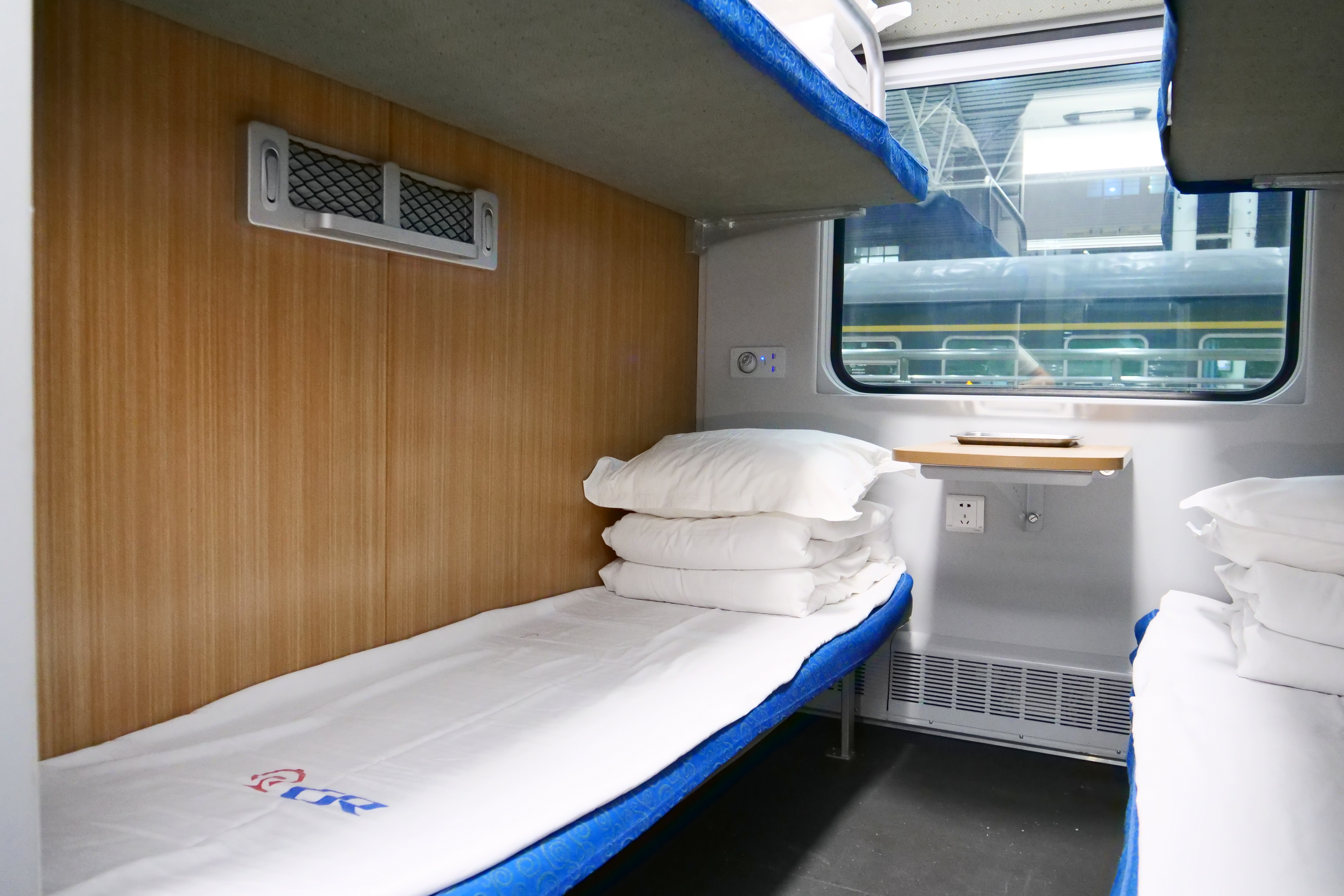
CR200J Second class sleeper

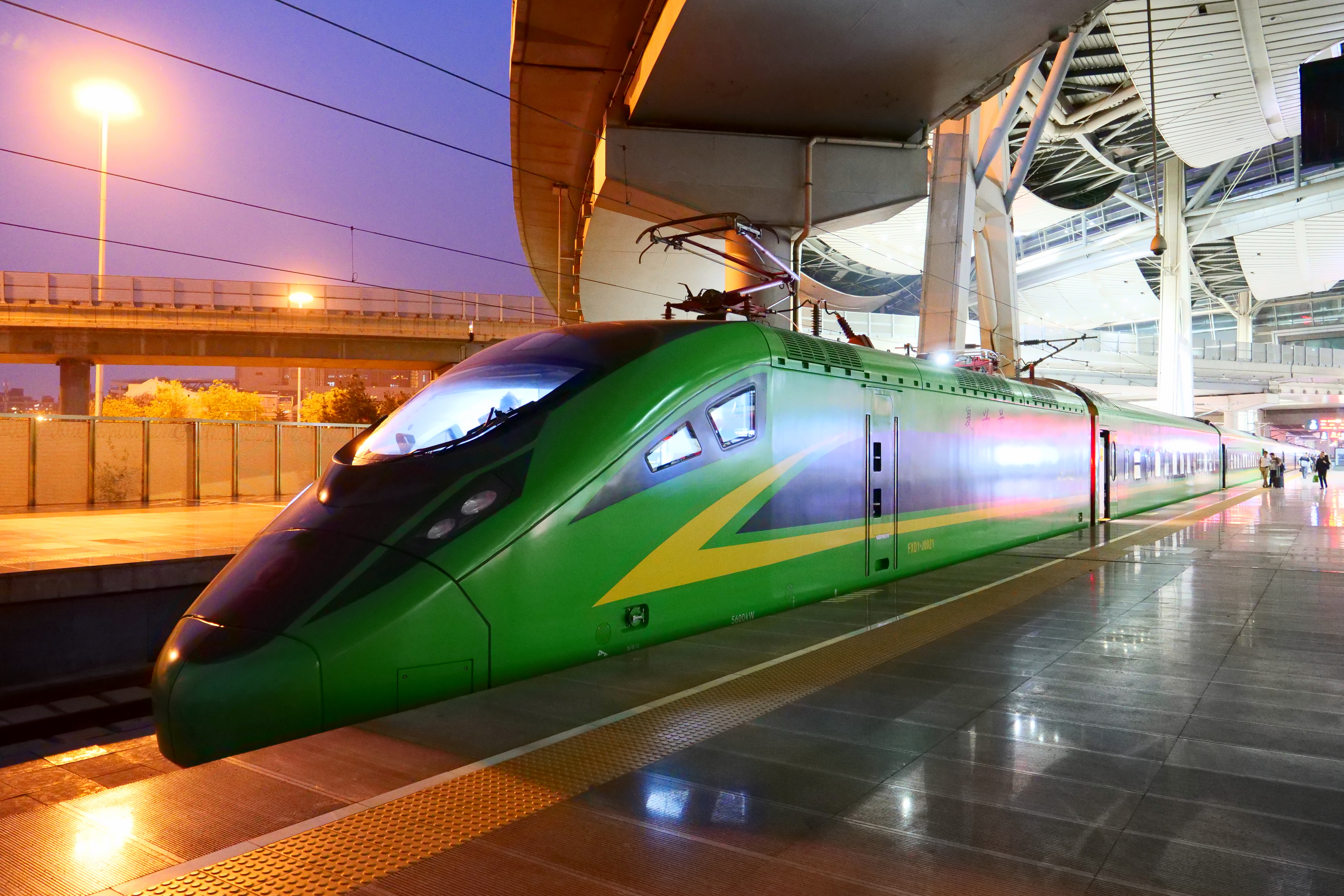
CR200J sleeper train at Beijing South railway station

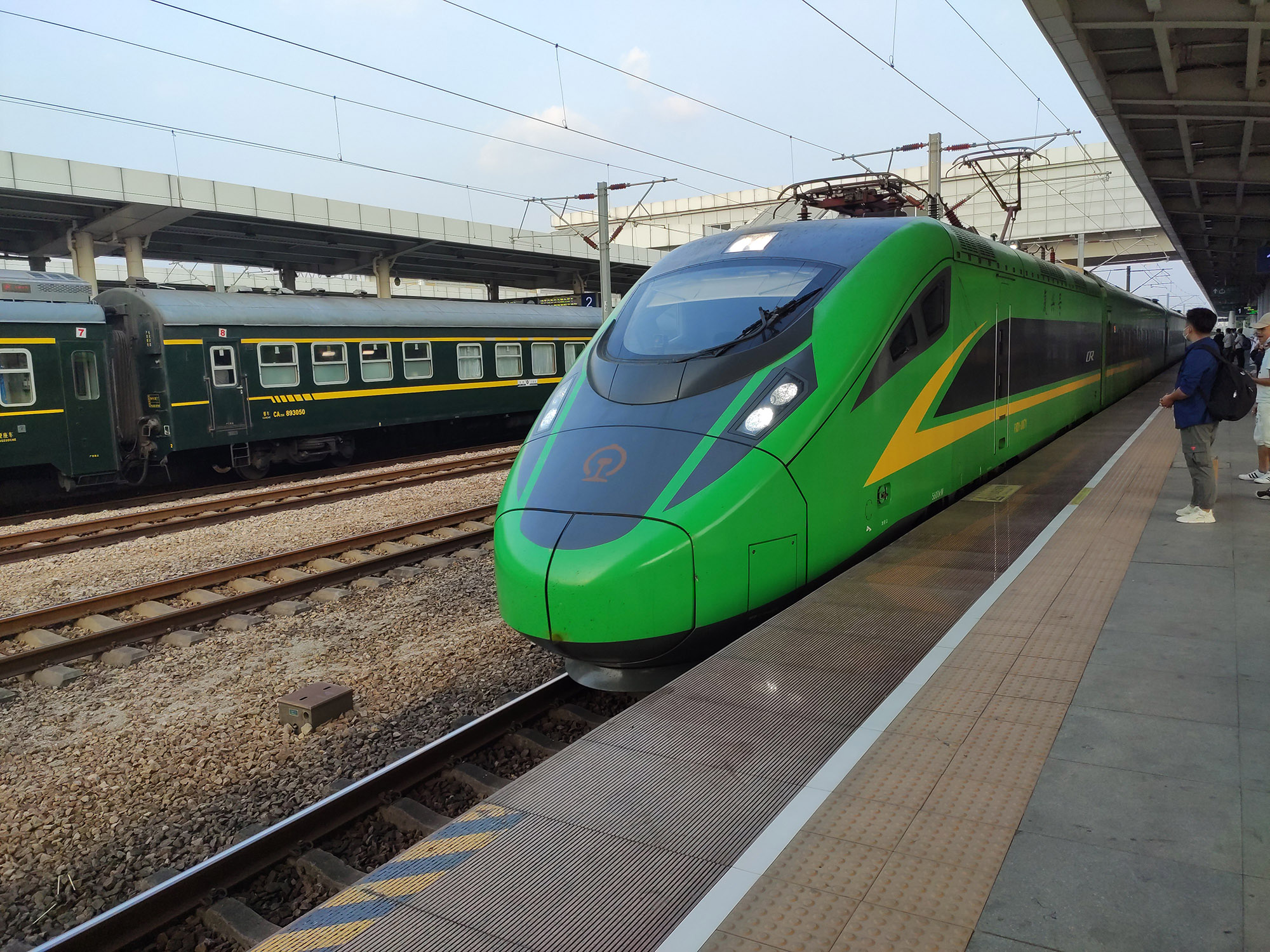
CR200J trainset at Dongguan East railway station

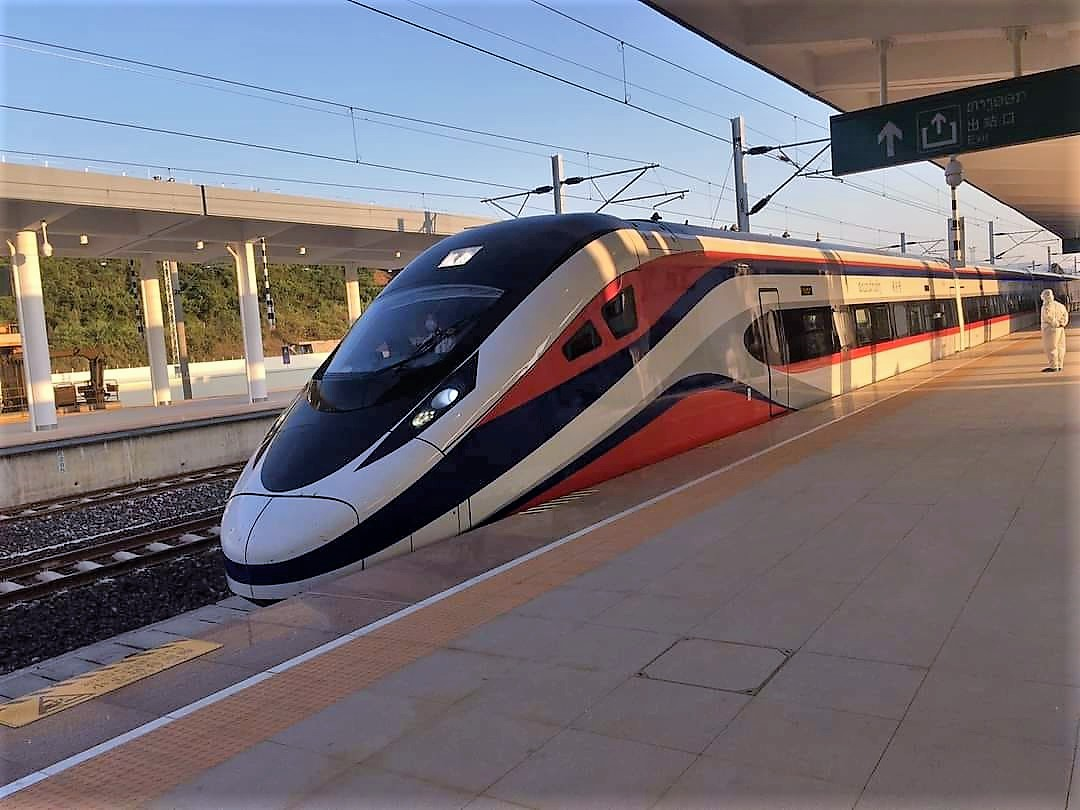
Laos-China Railway CR200J for service on the Boten–Vientiane railway

== See also ==
- China Railway DDJ1
- China Railway DJJ1
- China Star
- China Railway NDJ3
- X 2000
- E1000 series
