= Guangzhou Railway Museum =

Transport museum in Guangzhou, China

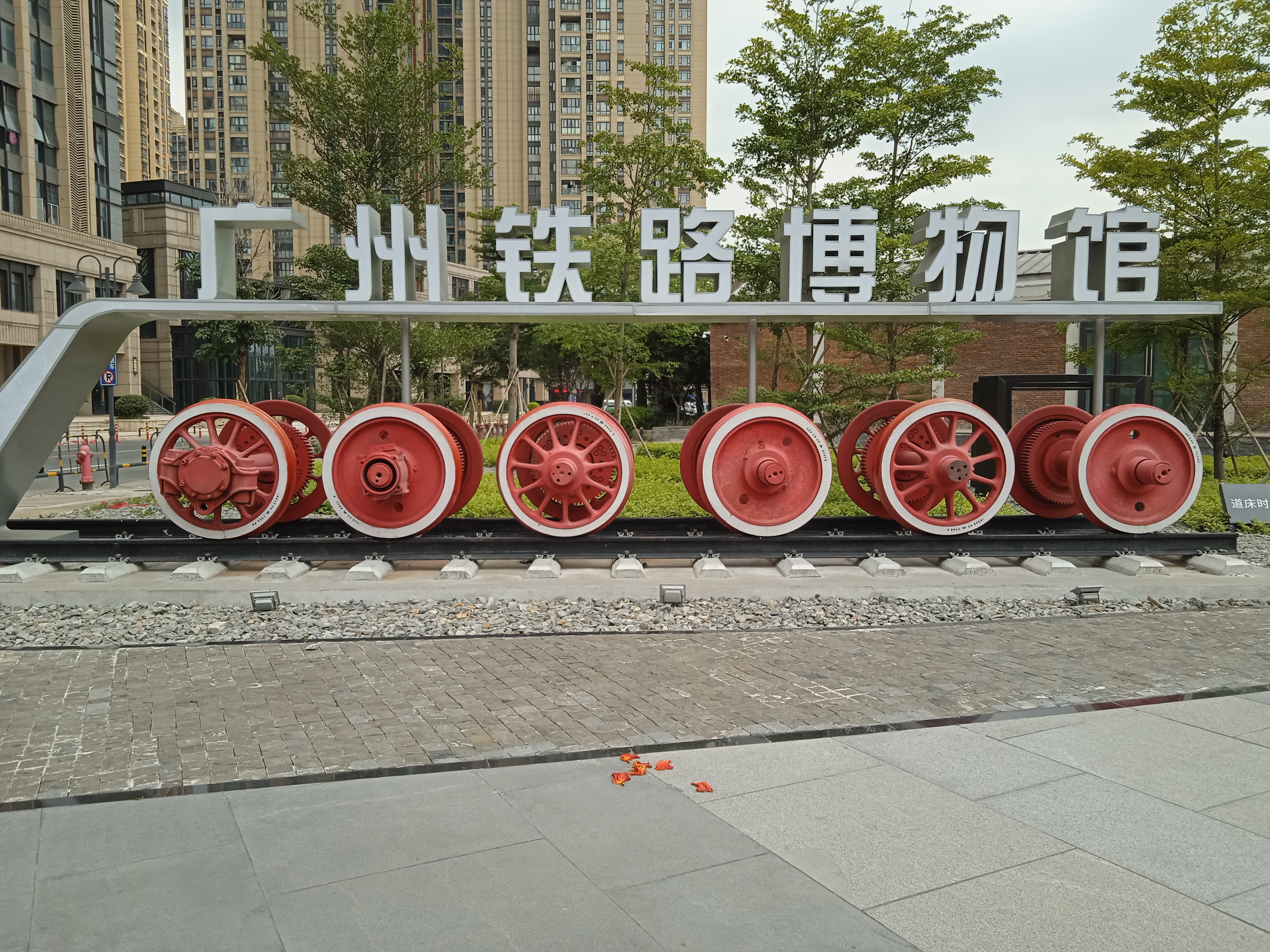
Guangzhou Railway Museum

Guangzhou Railway Museum (Chinese: 广州铁路博物馆) is a railway museum in Liwan District, Guangzhou, Guangdong Province, China.

== History ==
The museum is situated on the site of a former railway station, Huangsha, which opened in July 1907. On 18 December 1946, passenger services stopped using the station and it was renamed Guangzhou South. It closed completely on 10 June 2005.

The museum opened on 18 May 2022, International Museum Day.

== Items ==
The museum has an indoor area of approximately 18,500 square metres and an outdoor area of approximately 10,500 square metres.

- China Railways JS steam locomotive
- China Railways DF4D diesel-electric locomotive
- China Railways SS6B electric locomotive
- China Railways type 22 coaches (hard seat cars)
- China Railways 25G rolling stock (dining car)
- China Railways P1 Boxcar
- China Railway DJJ1 power car (had been taken down)
- China Railways 25C rolling stock (class 2 soft seat car, had been taken down)
