= China Railway DJJ1 =

Class of 8 Chinese electric multiple units

DJJ1
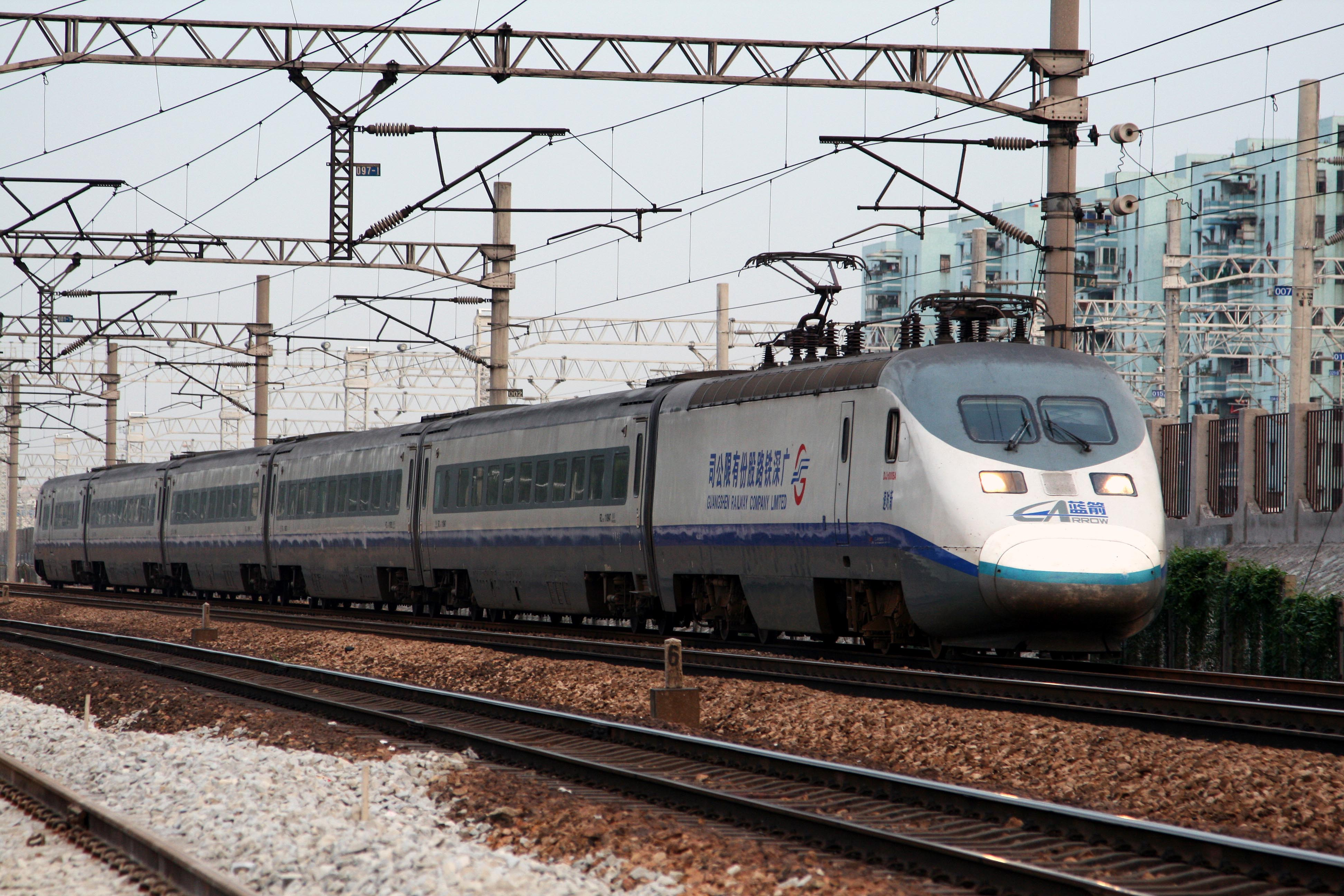
- DJJ1 "Blue Arrow"
Type and origin
- Power type: Electric
- Builder: Zhuzhou Electric Locomotive Works
Specifications
- Configuration
  - UIC: Bo'Bo'
- Loco weight: 78 t (171,961 lb)
- Electric system/s: 25 kV 50 Hz
- Transmission: AC-DC-AC
- Loco brake: Regenerative
- Train brakes: DK-1B electro-pneumatic
Performance figures
- Maximum speed: 210 km/h (130 mph)
- Power output: 4,800 kW (6,437 hp) continuous
- Tractive effort: 211 kN (47,435 lbf) starting 164 kN (36,869 lbf) continuous at 105 km/h (65 mph)

The DJJ1 "Blue Arrow" (simplified Chinese: 蓝箭; traditional Chinese: 藍箭) is a type of high-speed power car trainset used by mainland China Railway. They were manufactured in 2000 by Zhuzhou Electric Locomotive Works.

== Overview ==
8 DJJ1 sets were made. Each set consists of a power car unit and 6 passenger units, seating 421 passengers. All 8 trains were owned by Guangzhou Zhongche Railway Sales & Leasing, and were leased to Guangshen Railway. At the time of entering service, they ran between Guangzhou and Shenzhen.

All DJJ1 trains were running between Shaoguan and Pingshi since July 2007. It was officially retired in November 2012.

== Preservation ==
A DJJ1 power car was preserved at Guangzhou Railway Museum, but has subsequently been removed.

== See also ==
- China Railway DDJ1
- China Railway DJF1
- China Railway DJF2
- China Railway DJF3
- China Star
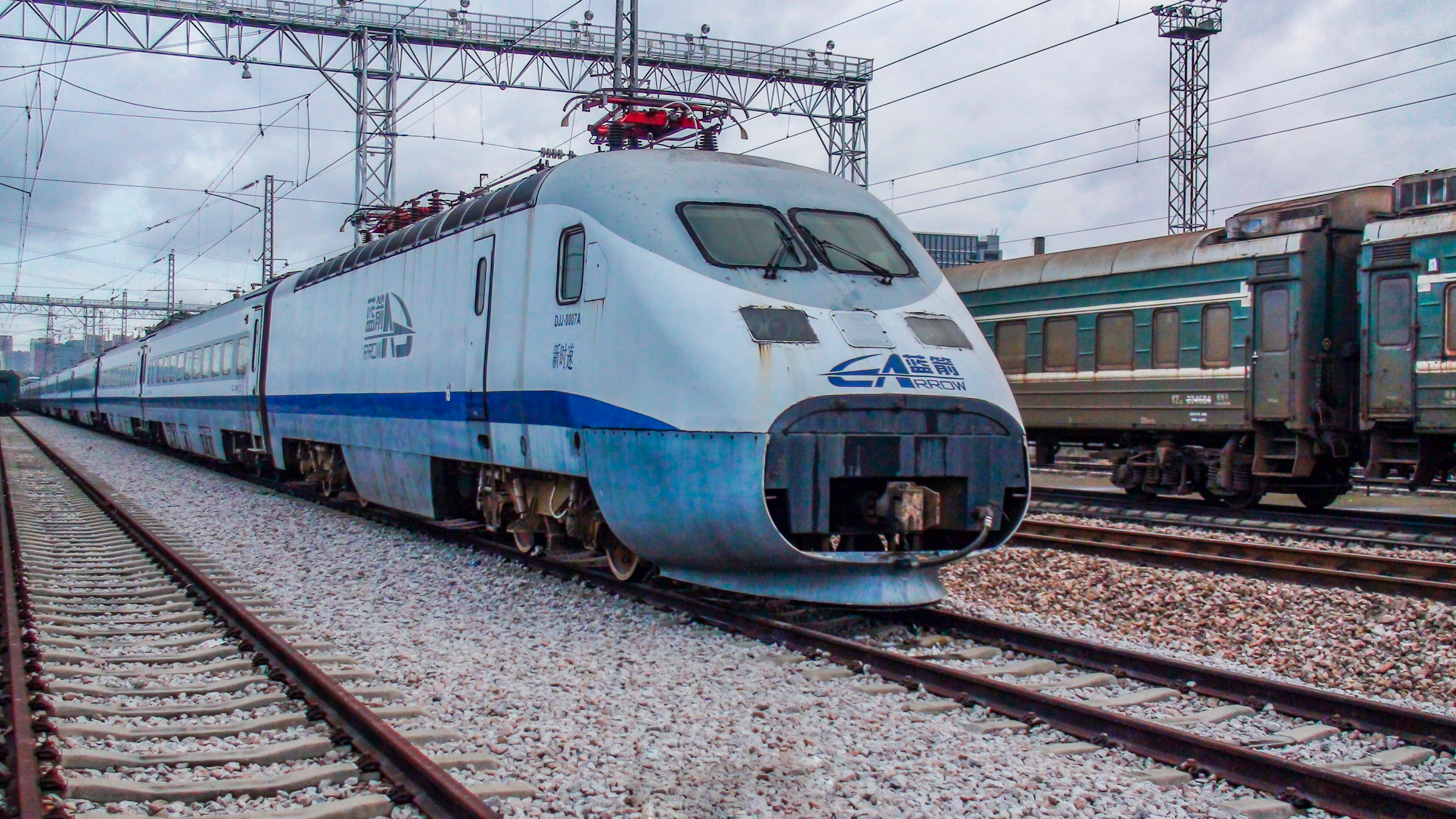
  DJJ1 parked at Pinghu South Station
- China Railway CR200J
- X2000
- E1000 series
