= China Railway DJJ2 =

Experimental high-speed electric multiple unit of China

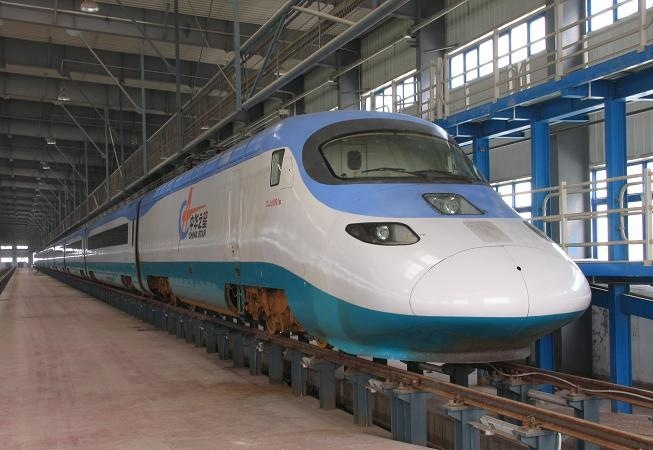
China Star

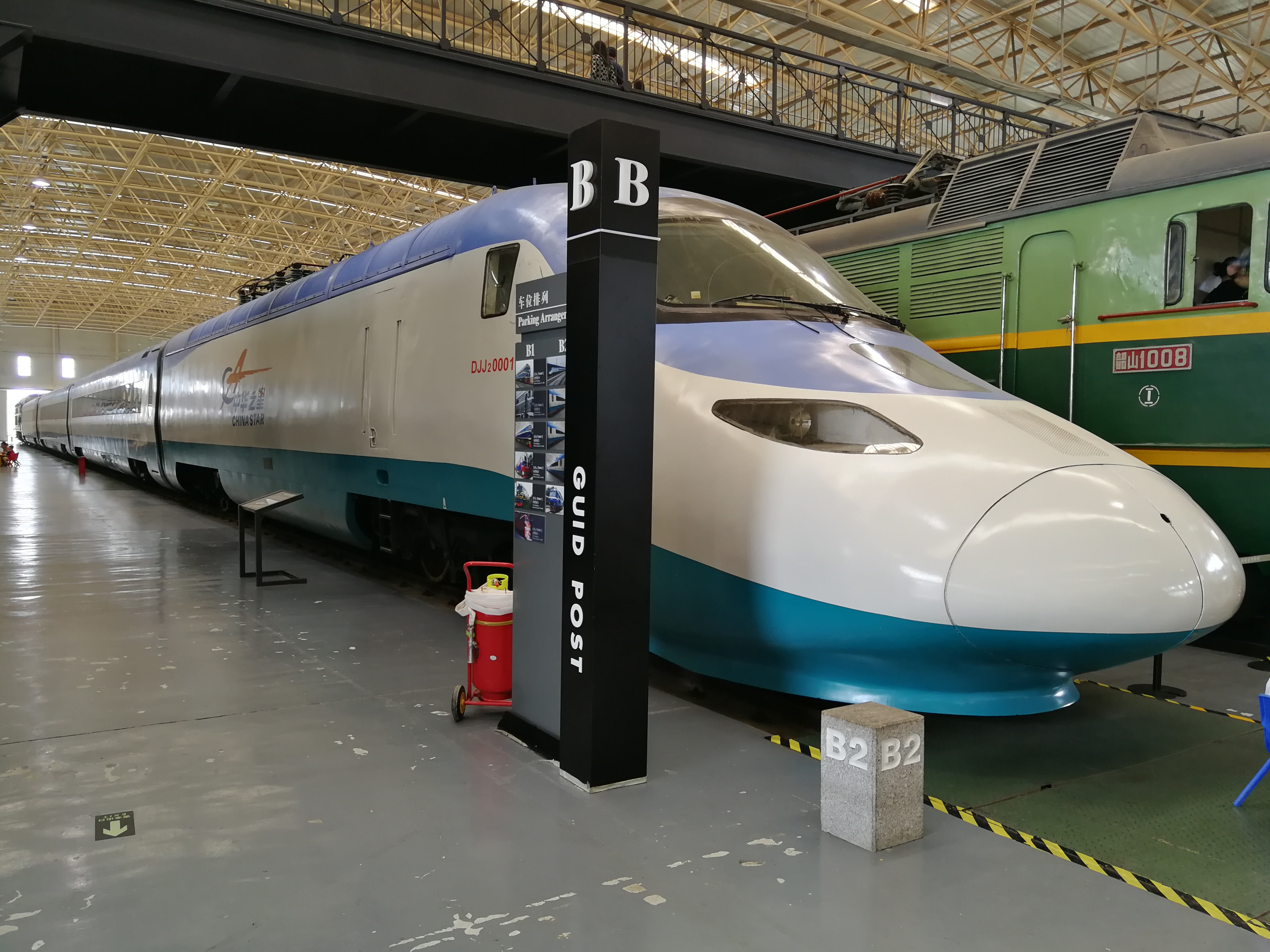
China Star in China Railway Museum

The DJJ2 "China Star" (Chinese: 中华之星) is an indigenously designed experimental high speed train manufactured in China. It is an EMU train developed from the DJJ1 "Blue Arrow" high speed train by Zhuzhou Electric Locomotive Works.

== Overview ==
It consists of 2 power cars and 9 passenger cars. The prototype rolled out in 2002. The train set is designed for a top speed of 270 km/h (170 mph), and a full load of 726 passengers. It achieved a top speed of 321 km/h (199 mph) on the newly built Qinshen Passenger Railway line during a test run in late 2002, setting a Chinese train speed record. However, due to signal system mismatches, and problems at electrical system and brake system, commercial services was delayed for the train. The train entered passenger service at Qinhuangdao-Shenyang PDL in 2005 but was limited to a top speed of 160 km/h (99 mph). Such problems still persists in services and was discontinued in 2006.

Shenyang RB ceased services offered by "China Star" from August 2006. As of 2007, the train was sealed and placed at an unsheltered parking area of the depot.

One of its power car and three passenger cars were moved to China Railway Museum, becoming the first high speed train being displayed in the museum.

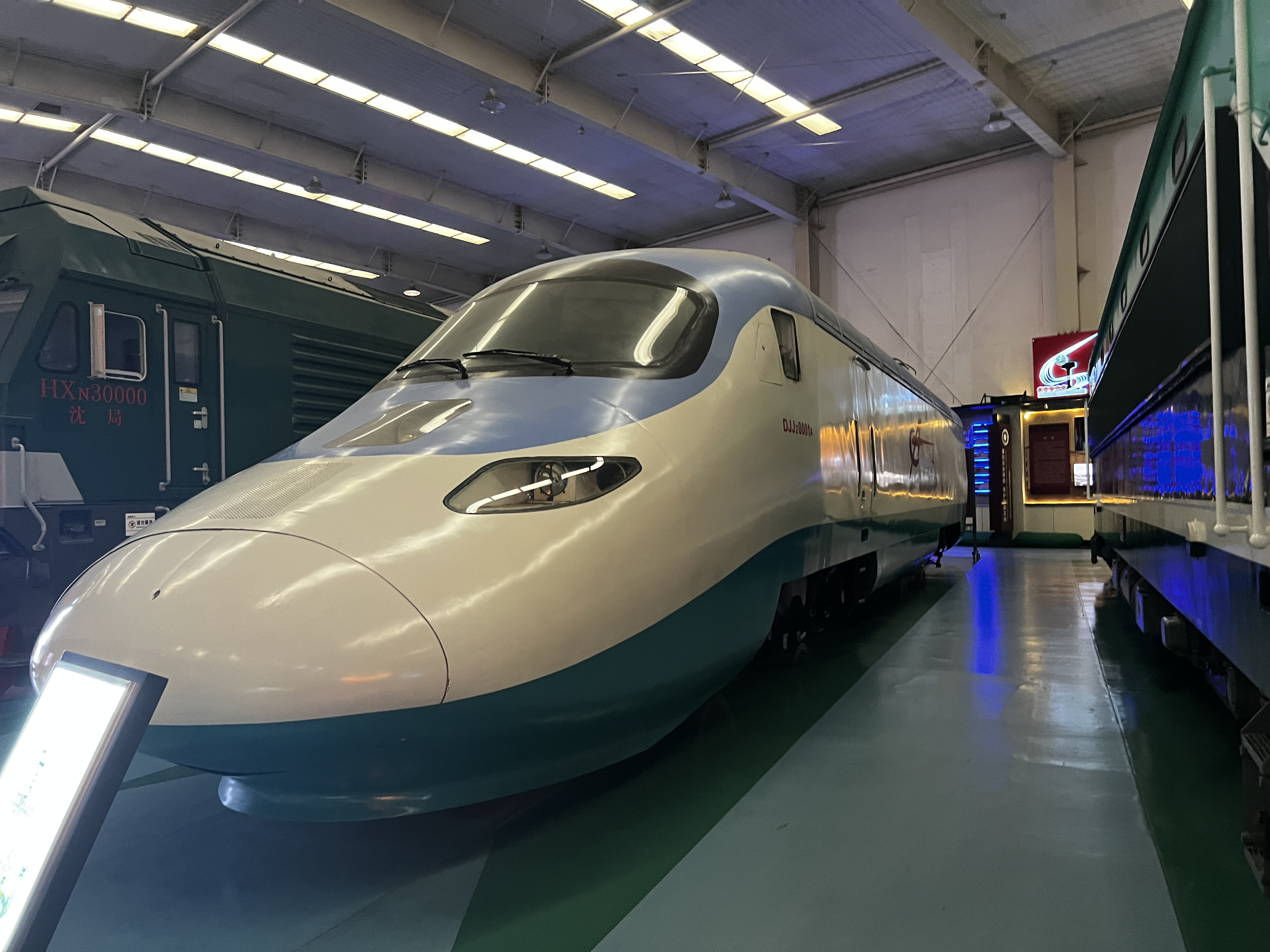
China Star at the Steam Locomotive Gallery of Shenyang

Also the other power car is now displayed at the Steam Locomotive Gallery of Shenyang alongside a CRH3. The only two high speed train displayed in the gallery.

== See also ==
- China Railway DJJ1
- China Railway DDJ1
- China Railway CR200J
- E1000 series
