= China Railway DDJ1 =

Chinese 1st generation high-speed electric multiple unit

DDJ1 "Great White Shark"
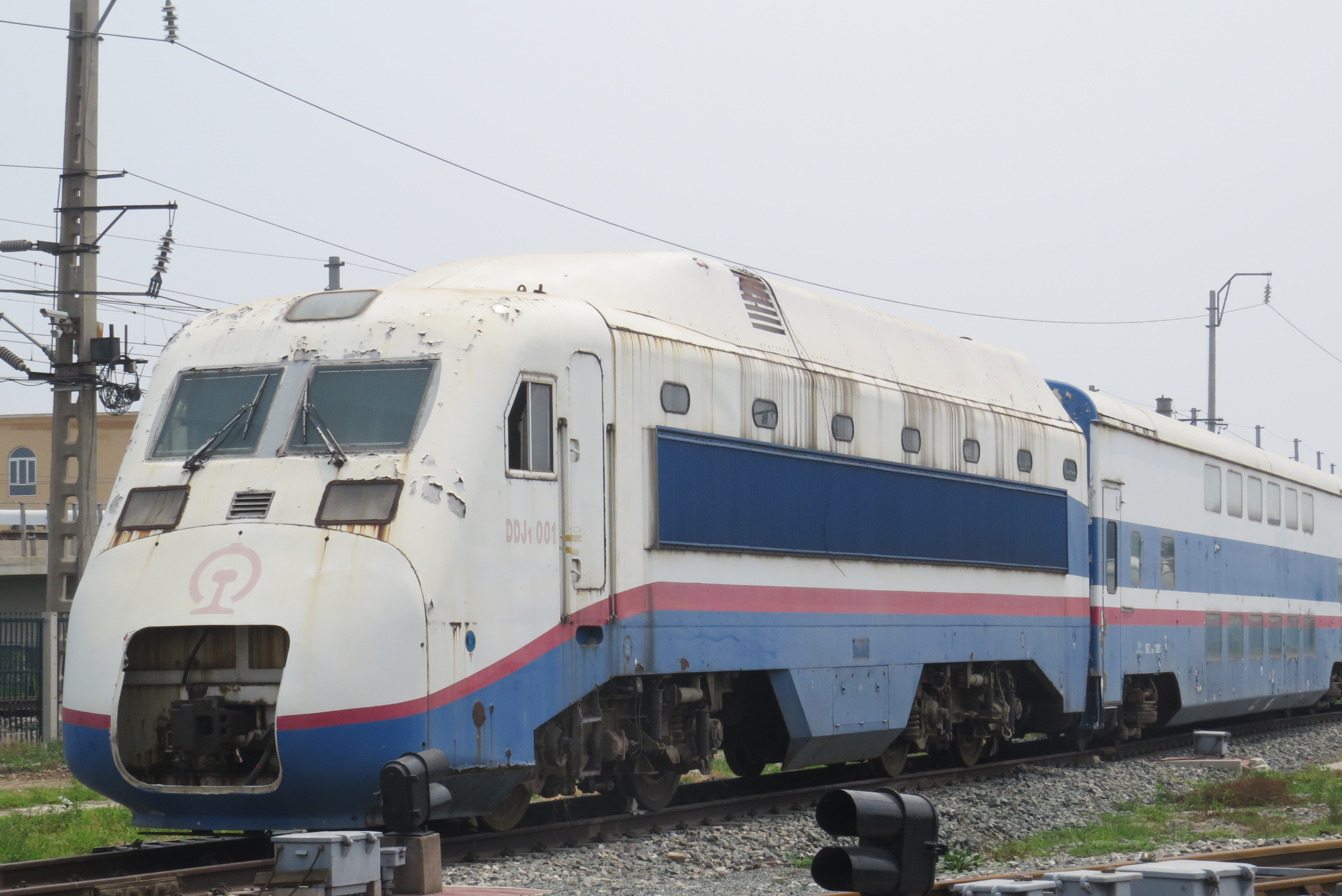
- Stored at Beijing Ring railway
- Stock type: high speed-EMU
- Manufacturers: CRRC Zhuzhou Locomotive; CRRC Changchun Railway Vehicles; CRRC Qingdao Sifang; CRRC Tangshan; CRRC Nanjing Puzhen Rolling Stock
- Constructed: 1999
- Number built: 1 set (6 cars, 1 locomotive)
- Formation: DT-T-T-T-T-T-M
- Capacity: 438
- Operator: China Railways

Specifications
- Car length: 18.316 m (60 ft 1.1 in) (locomotive DDJ1); 25.5 m (83 ft 8 in) (passenger trailer RZ225DT); 24.32 m (79 ft 9 in) (driving trailer RZ225DK)
- Maximum speed: 200 km/h (120 mph) (design); 223.3 km/h (138.8 mph) (test)
- Weight: 84,000 kilograms (185,188 lb)
- Traction system: 4,000 kW (5,364 hp)
- Traction motors: four ZD-118
- Power output: 1,000 kW (1,341 hp)
- Tractive effort: 108 kN (continuous); 180 kN (starting)
- Transmission: AC–DC
- Acceleration: 0.22 m/s^{2} (0.49 mph/s)
- Power supply: 25 kV 50 Hz (single phase)
- Electric system: tri-phase thyristor
- UIC classification: Bo-Bo
- Braking systems: Dynamic braking, electro-pneumatic brake
- Track gauge: 1,435 mm (4 ft 8 1/2 in)

The DDJ_{1} (Note: the name DDJ stands for: D－动 (EMU), D–DC power, J–集 (locomotive hauled)) is a first generation high-speed electric multiple unit built for China Railway, built by Zhuzhou Electric Locomotives, Changchun Railway Vehicles, Sifang Railway Vehicles, Tangshan Passenger vehicle factory, Nanjing Puzhen and developed by Zhuzhou Electric Locomotive Research Centre. It was built in 1999, and was an experimental vehicle, with only one set built, as it did not enter mass production. The design was well received as part of national science in the 9th five year plan. The DDJ_{1} is in a push–pull configuration, with only one locomotive in the set and the other end being a trailer with a driver's cabin.

== Development history ==
Before the 1990s, the maximum speed of passenger train transport had long stopped at 120 km/h (75 mph), and faced increasing competition from airlines and highways. In 1990, the Ministry of Railways decided to use the Guangzhou–Shenzhen railway as a technological testbed for higher-speed railways of 160 km/h (99.4 mph), to conduct experiments of new technology and develop high speed railways. In December 1994, the new higher-speed Guangshen railway was put into operation, providing valuable knowledge for the future development of high speed railways in China. After multiple experiments, the targeted speed of 160 km/h (99.4 mph) was finally put into use on 1 April 1997, with the completion of 752 km (467 mi) of tracks at ≥160 km/h (99.4 mph) as part of the first round of the campaign to raise the speed of railway travel in China.

To further the competitiveness of the railways, the ministry of railways decided to push towards a speed of 200 km/h (124 mph). On 5 January 1997, an SS8 locomotive at the Beijing Ring railway testing ground broke the railway speed record in China, achieving 212.6 km/h (132.1 mph). In the same year, the goal of a 200 km/h (124 mph) was formally introduced to the 9th five-year plan as part of the developments related to technology.

=== Research ===
In April 1997, the Ministry of Railways set the target of developing a high-speed train in "200 km/h (124 mph) passenger train development task", where the target was to develop a viable electrical multiple-unit with operating speeds of 200 km/h (124 mph) and a maximum speed of 220 km/h (137 mph). The layout of DDJ_{1} was '1M6T', with the traction power concentrated in one car. Zhuzhou Electric Locomotive and Zhuzhou Electric Locomotive design institute was responsible for the power car, Changchun Railway Vehicles was responsible for overall research and design; it was also developed and produced three cars; the 1st class car, single deck 2nd class car and the driving trailer. Nanjing Puzhen Rolling Stock built the double deck 2nd class car, Qingdao Sifang Locomotive & Rolling Stock and Tangshan Railway Vehicle each built a single deck 2nd class car.

After initial testing, the '200 km/h EMU' was formally named the DDJ_{1} in March 1999.

=== History ===
External images
- DDJ1 at Shenzhen station
- DDJ1 departing Shenzhen station
- lower deck of double deck car

On 26 May 1999, the locomotive completed tests within the factory of Zhuzhou Electric Locomotive, and in June, it was sent to the Beijing Ring railway, while it waited for the other carriages to arrive. The set was tested in its complete form for the first time on 7 July 1999, and various capabilities of the set were evaluated, such as its tractive capability. During this time, the set was speed limited to 180 km/h (112 mph).

In August 1999, after the DDJ_{1} completed safety tests at Beijing, it was sent to the Guangzhou–Shenzhen railway for line running. The run-in began 20 August 1999, for a period of 12 days, it was involved in many safety tests related to the new, higher speed of the locomotive. However, it was again limited to 180 km/h, instead of its design speed of 200 km/h (124 mph). From 27 September 1999, it was able to start passenger operation between Shenzhen railway station and Guangzhou East railway station.

However, due to the use of four 1,000 kW (1,341 hp) which were built on the basis of increasing electrical current to increase the rotations per minute, it approached the technological constraints of DC motors (which in most countries with electric railways had been superseded by AC motors throughout the 1990s for new construction), such that the reliability was poor and it had a high power consumption. The set had a low reliability, and in a usage period of a year, it was out of service for months, and was only fit to be used as a reserve vehicle. Around mid-2002, the DDJ_{1} was removed from service, and from October 2002, the set was placed under the control of the Railway Institute. From April 2003, it has been stored at the Beijing Ring railway, where it has remained since. Despite the low reliability, it served a valuable lesson on the development of high speed electrical multiple units in China, although it did reveal the immaturity of local technology at the time.

== Technical features ==
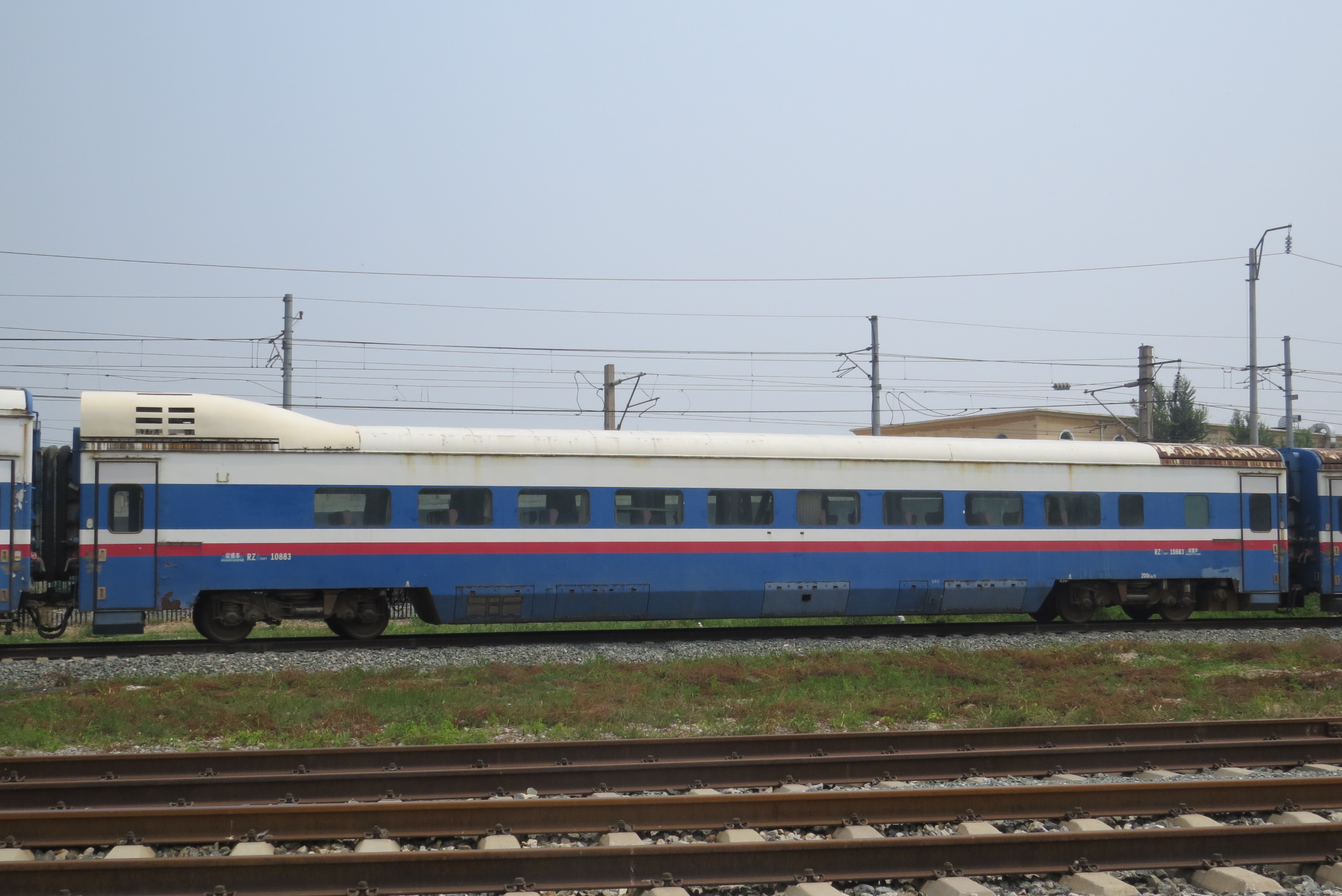
The aerodynamic shroud to ensure better airflow to the double deck car is visible.

=== Overall structure ===
The DDJ_{1} electrical multiple-unit is in a push-pull configuration, with a total of seven cars, consisting one power car, five single deck passenger cars and a double deck passenger car. The motor car is a 4-axle, high speed electric locomotive. From front to rear are the driver's cabin, the first electrical cabin, transformers, second electrical cabin and the machinery room. The electrical cabins house both the primary and auxiliary rectifier, braking resistors, electrical controls and control computers. The machinery room has the ventilators, compressors and air brake actuators. The transformers are located in the centre of the locomotive, and extend below the body. The car body, bogie, transformers are built as lightly as possible, so that it met the required locomotive weight to 84 t (185,188 lb), and axle weight of 21 t (46,297 lb). To reduce drag and noise, the locomotive is streamlined with shrouds on the roof tops and the lower sides are fitted with skirts.

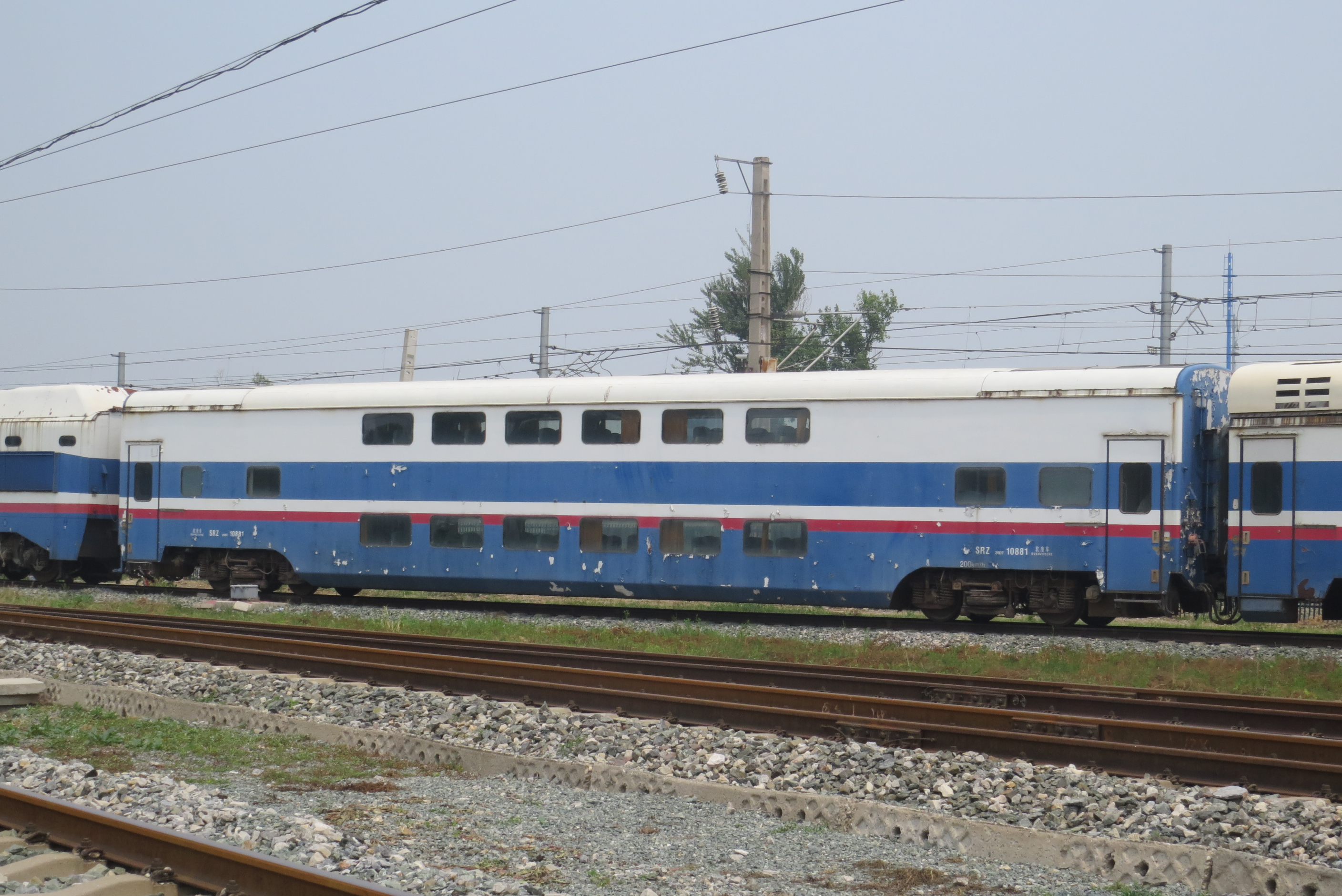
The double deck car

The passenger cars are built with a monocoque body, with a capacity for 438 passengers in total. Both first and second class seats are arranged in a two by two layout, differing only in seat width and more space between each row. To improve the sealing of the passenger cars, the windows and ventilation are sealed, with plug doors imported from France, Japanese inter-carriage shrouds and Swedish vacuum toilets. Like with the locomotive, all passenger cars are lined with skirts to reduce drag and noise, and a shroud is located between the double deck and single deck cars to smooth the airflow. The cars are connected with tightlock coupling. The driving trailer is built with composite materials, with the windscreen being fitted with electrically heated dual layer anti-shatter windows. To overcome the stress of operating the locomotive in push configuration, it borrows from experience of operating the X2000 tilting train by adding counterweights on the frame of the leading bogie of the driving trailer.

=== Set composition ===
Carriage number	1	2	3	4	5	6	/
Class	2nd class (soft seater)	2nd class (soft seater)		1st class (soft seater)	2nd class (soft seater)	Double deck 2nd class (soft seater)	(motor car)
Type	〇〇 〇〇 Driving trailer	〇〇 〇〇 Trailer					●● ●● Motor
Carriage registration	RZ2_{25DK} 10886	RZ2_{25DT} 10885	RZ2_{25DT} 10884	RZ1_{25DT} 10882	RZ2_{25DT} 10883	SRZ2_{25DT} 10881	DDJ_{1} 001
Factory	CRRC Changchun Railway Vehicles	CRRC Tangshan	CSR Sifang	CRRC Changchun Railway Vehicles		CRRC Nanjing Puzhen	CSR Zhuzhou Electric Locomotive
Bogie	CW-200	PW-200	SW-200	CW-200		PW-200	
Notes	Driver's cabin						Driver's cabin, pantograph

=== Electrical systems ===
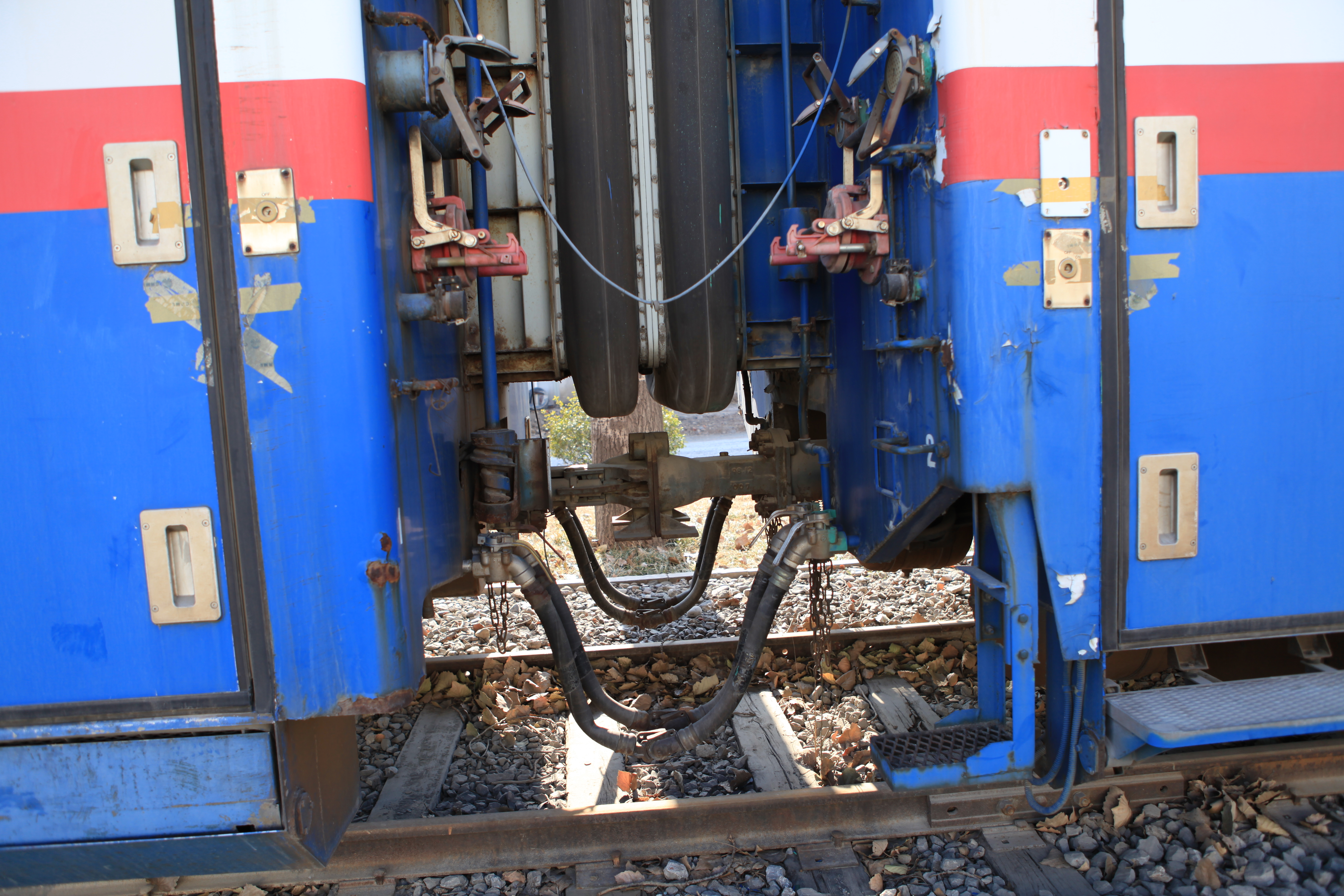
Carriage joint. The set control cable is visible hanging at the top.

The locomotive design is not dissimilar to the China Railways SS8, as it fulfils a similar role in either pushing or pulling passenger carriages with an AC to DC power conversion. Both use unequal tri-phase thyristors and adjustable magnetic excitation, allowing the set to maintain a speed of 127 to 200 km/h (79 to 124 mph) in long term operation. The motors used are the ZD118 traction motors, which are a further development of the ZD115 traction motors from the SS8. The motor has six sections which can be powered, with C-type insulators, has compensation windings and is designed for medium voltage. Structurally, ZD118 and ZD115 are the same, but it increases the traction power and can sustain 1,000 kW (1,341 hp) in operation, becoming the most powerful AC–DC locomotive of China Railways.

The auxiliary electrics convert the single phase AC to DC, providing head-end power to the passenger carriages, providing two paths of 600 volt electricity to the carriages, which is then converted by an inverter into 380 volt AC, providing power for the air conditioning, heating, lighting and water boilers.

=== Control system ===
The DDJ_{1} uses a similar electrical system to the export TM1 electric locomotives, combining Chinese made microcomputers with Adtranz "MICAS-S2" microcontrollers, where the "MICAS-S2" serves to record faults and manages the multiple unit system. The controls are operated through three cables; the set control, the individual car control and the input control. The set control cable runs through the entire train, connecting the motor to the driving trailer. The information for set control is sent by frequency-shift keying, also connected to the individual car controls. The controls are managed through a single logic control unit, with controls the traction motors, overspeed protection, air conditioner control, neutral zone controls and brake controls. Instead of gauges, the controls are operated through a liquid-crystal display.

=== Bogie ===
The locomotive has two sets of bogies, each with two axles in the Bo-Bo layout. As the locomotive is based on the basic structure of the SS8, the bogies are also largely similar. The bogies use Low Alloy High Tensile steel. The suspension between the wheels and the bogie frame are soil springs with vertical dampers; the suspension between the bogie and the locomotive are flexible coil springs with vertical, yaw and horizontal damping. The wheels are driven by six elastic shafts connecting the frame supported motor, driven with a gearbox on each side.

== See also ==
- Guangzhou–Shenzhen railway
- China Railways SS8
- China Railway DJJ1
- China Railway CR200J
- X 2000
- E1000 series

Similar designs

- China Railway NZJ, an experimental DMU designed in the same time period
- China Railway NZJ1 "New Dawn"
- China Railway NZJ2 "Shenzhou" / "Jinlun"
