= Diesel multiple unit =

Self-powered diesel trains

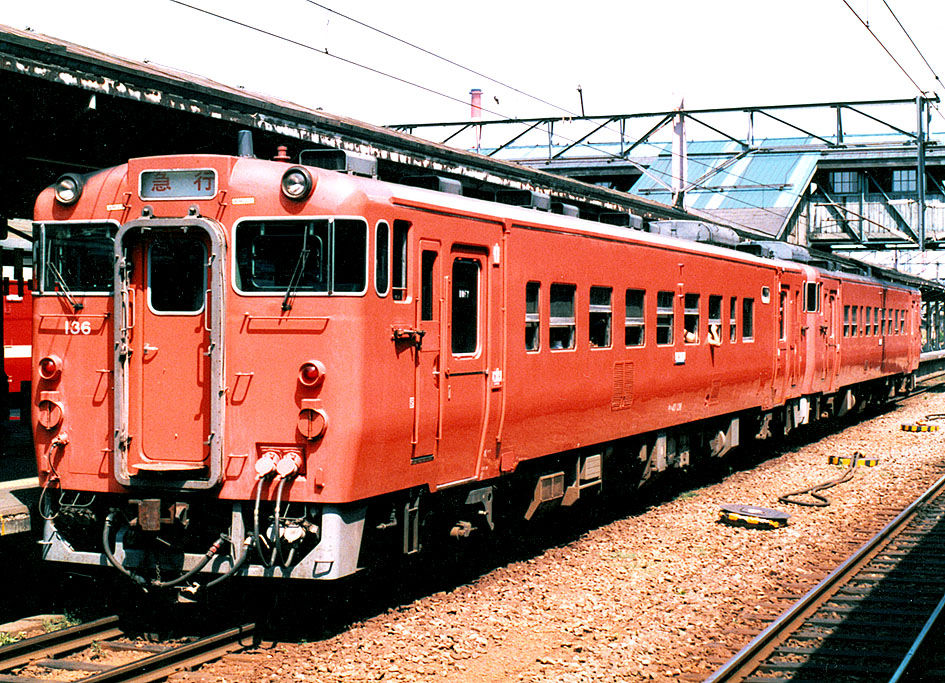
A JNR Class KiHa40 in use for Erimo Express service, Hokkaido, Japan

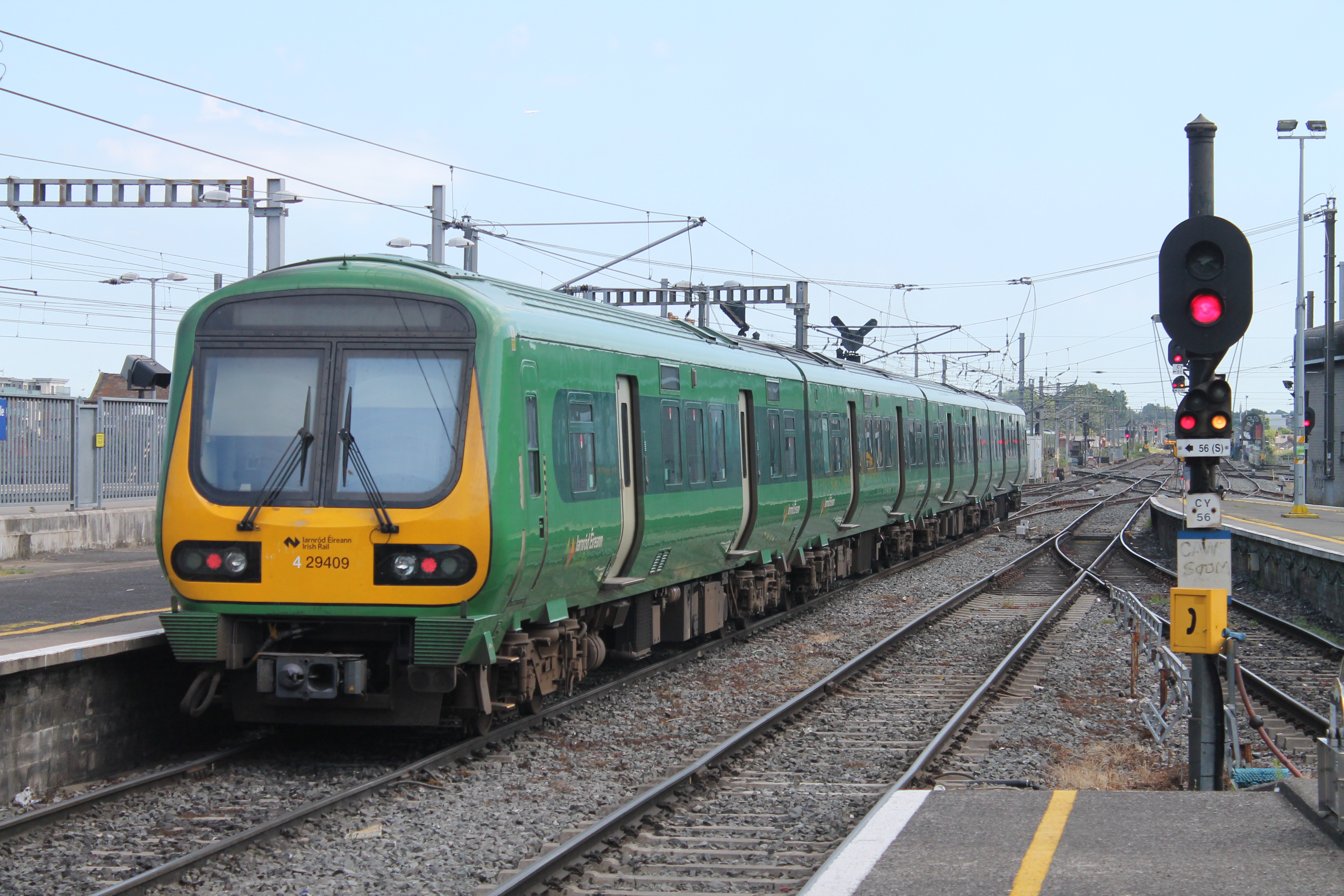
An IE 29000 Class diesel multiple unit on a western commuter service at Connolly station, in Dublin, Ireland

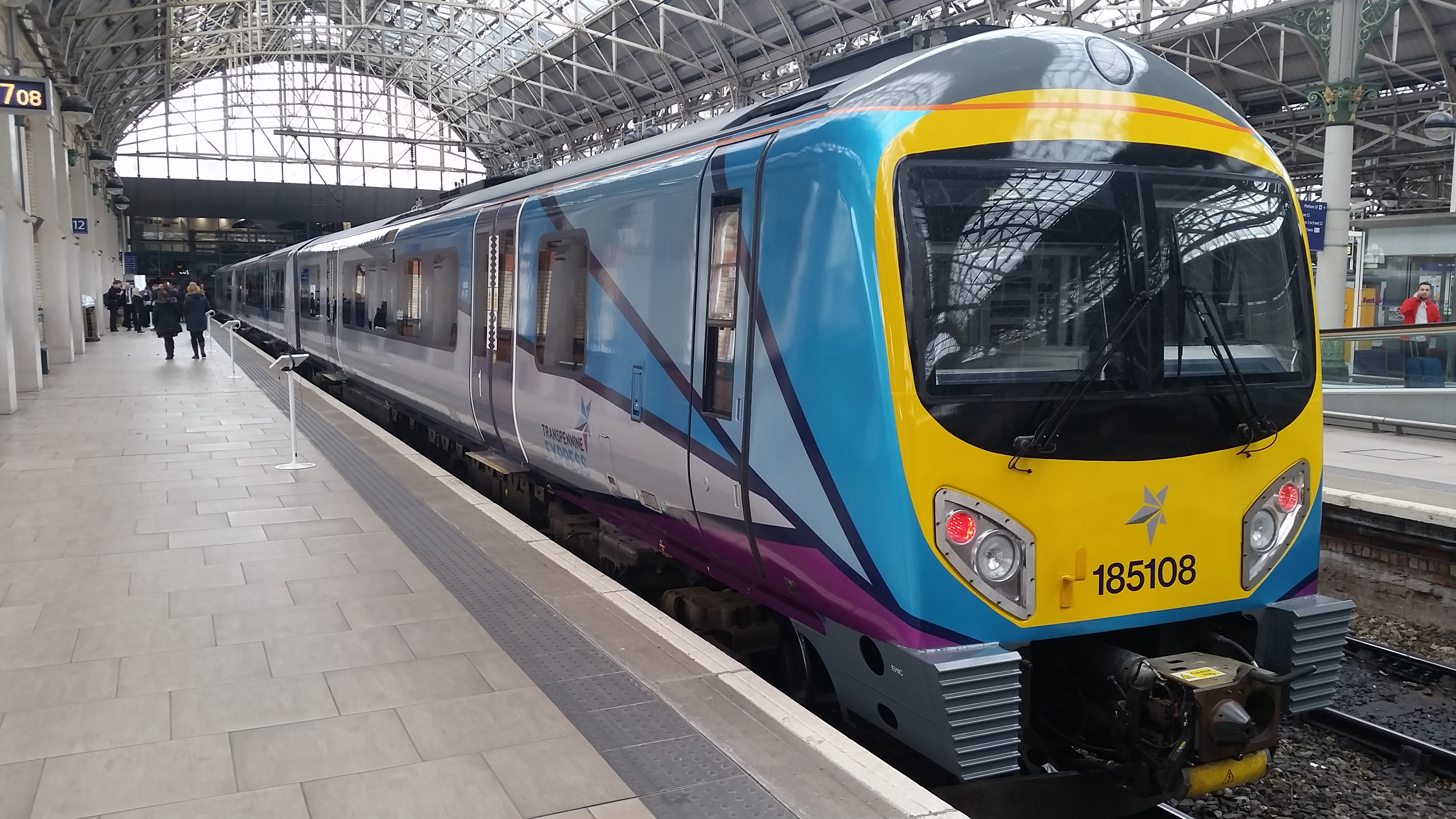
A Class 185 diesel multiple unit operated by TransPennine Express at Manchester Piccadilly, England

A diesel multiple unit (DMU) is a multiple unit train powered by on-board diesel engines. A DMU requires no separate locomotive, as the engines are incorporated into one or more of the carriages. When additional carriages are coupled on, their controls are connected through and a single driver can control every engine in the train. This also allows the driver to drive from a cab at either end, simplifying reversing. Diesel-powered single-unit railcars are generally regarded as DMUs for most operations, at least with smaller trains.

== Advantages ==
The first diesel railcars appeared in the 1930s and DMUs became popular immediately post-war. They offered several cost-saving advantages, at a time when railway operations were short of funds:

- Greater convenience of operation. They could go from parked and stabled to running a train in little time, unlike a steam locomotive that needed to be prepared hours in advance, then disposed afterwards. They could also run trains intermittently through the working day without needing to tend their fire or boiler even when idle.
- Reduced crew. They could be driven by a single driver, without a fireman.
- Simpler station layouts. They did not need a locomotive to 'run round' the train at a terminus station, merely for the driver to change ends. This made them quicker to operate in a busy station. It also permitted small stations to be simplified from a loop to a simple dead-end, also saving on signalling costs and the need to employ a signaller. This simplicity could be enough to keep small branch lines in viable operation, rather than being closed.
- Greater flexibility. As each carriage or pair of carriages was powered, more carriages could be added to a longer train and there was no need to swap in a more powerful locomotive.

== Design ==
The diesel engine may be located above the frame in an engine bay or under the floor. Driving controls can be at both ends, on one end or in a separate car.

== Types by transmission ==
DMUs may also be classified by the method of transmitting motive power to their wheels: diesel–mechanical DMMU, diesel–hydraulic DHMU, or diesel–electric DEMU.

=== Diesel–mechanical ===
In a diesel–mechanical multiple unit (DMMU), the rotating energy of the engine is transmitted via a gearbox and driveshaft directly to the wheels of the train, like a car. The transmissions can be shifted manually by the driver, as in the great majority of first-generation British Rail DMUs but, in most applications, gears are changed automatically.

=== Diesel–hydraulic ===
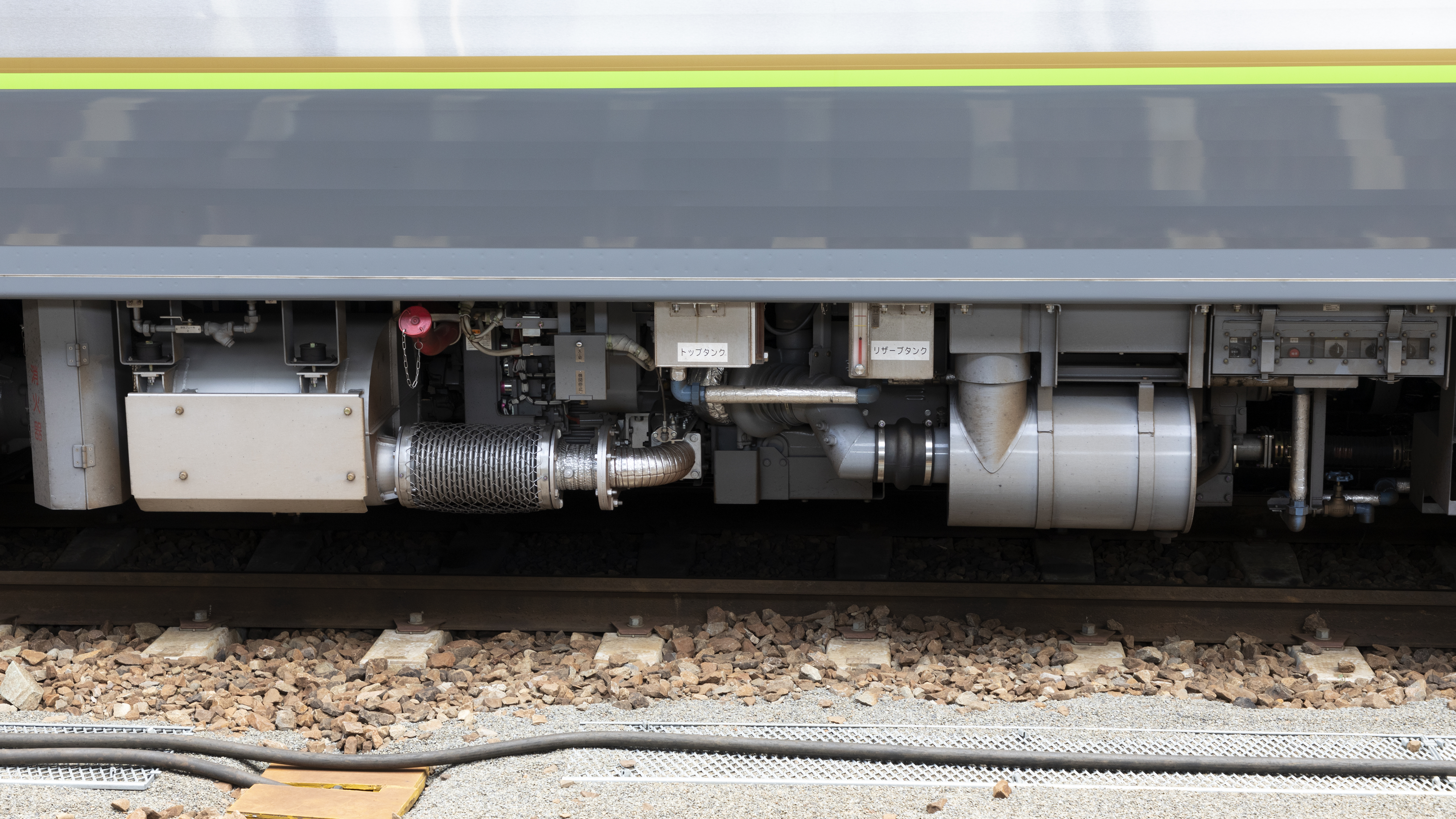
One of the underfloor diesel engines with hydraulic transmission under a car of JR Shikoku 2700 series DMU

In a diesel–hydraulic multiple unit (DHMU), a hydraulic torque converter, a type of fluid coupling, acts as the transmission medium for the motive power of the diesel engine to turn the wheels. Some units feature a hybrid mix of hydraulic and mechanical transmissions, usually reverting to the latter at higher operating speeds as this decreases engine RPM and noise.

Diesel-hydraulic locomotive transmissions can be hard to distinguish from diesel-mechanical, where both have multiple mechanical ratios and a single torque converter. This is especially true for lower powers (<500 hp) such as DMUs. Some railways, such as British Rail in the 1960s, retreated from using hydraulic transmissions from main line locomotives, yet had no difficulty with large DMU fleets based on torque converters.

=== Diesel–electric ===
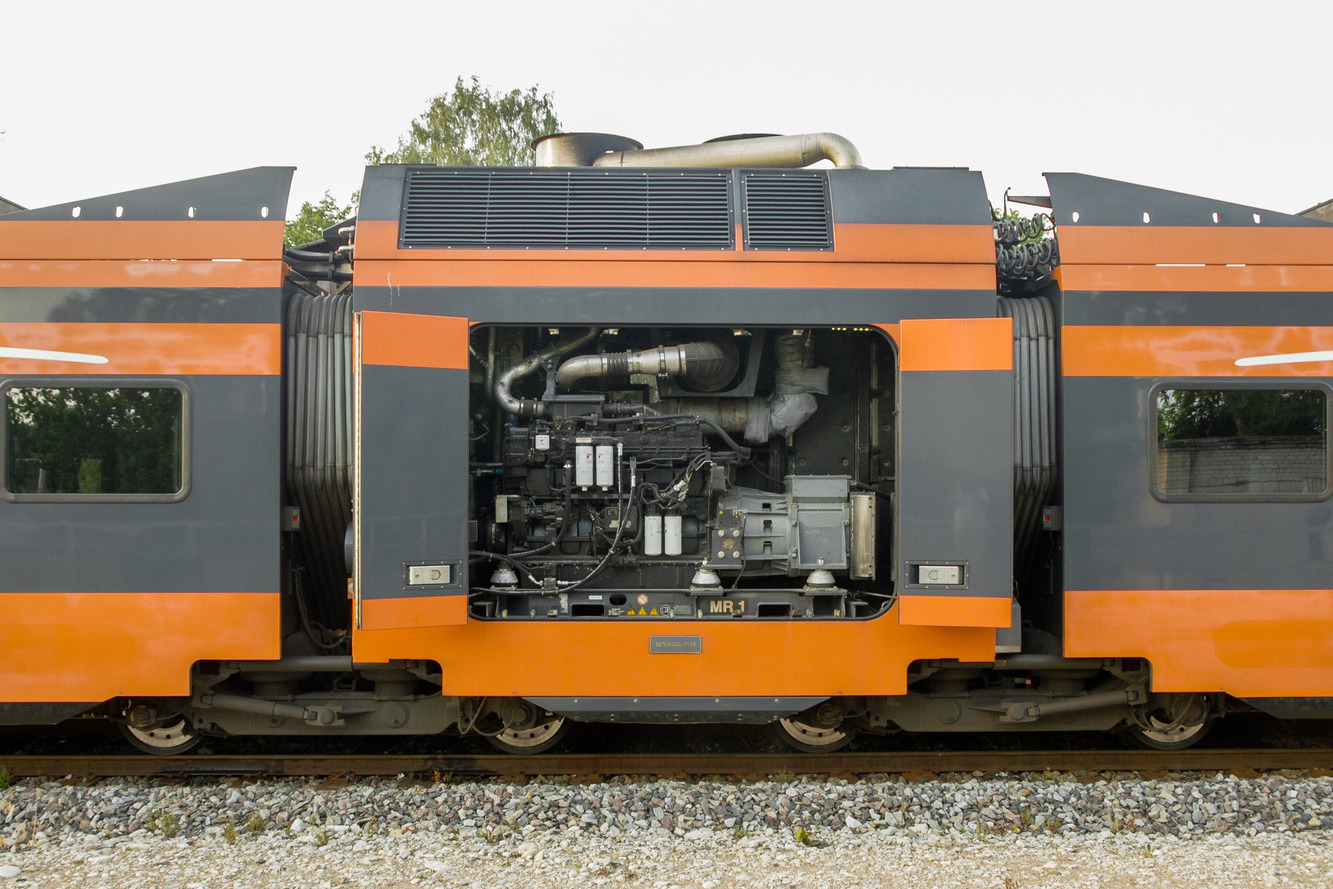
The Power Pack car of Stadler FLIRT DMU, with open bay of a diesel-generator. The Jacobs bogies under this car do not have their own traction motors, which are mounted on bogies under other cars.

In a diesel–electric multiple unit (DEMU), a diesel engine drives an electrical generator or an alternator, which produces electrical energy. The generated current is then fed to electric traction motors on the wheels or bogies in the same way as a conventional diesel–electric locomotive.

On some DEMUs, such as the Bombardier Voyager, each car is entirely self-contained and has its own engine, generator and electric motors. In other designs, such as the Class 207 or the Stadler GTW and Stadler FLIRT DMU, some cars within the consist may be entirely unpowered or only feature electric motors, obtaining electric current from other cars in the consist which have a generator and engine.

== Around the world ==
=== Europe ===
==== Belgium ====
NMBS/SNCB uses its NMBS/SNCB Class 41 DMUs on the few remaining unelectrified lines. As electrification progresses, the DMUs have become less utilised.

==== Croatia ====
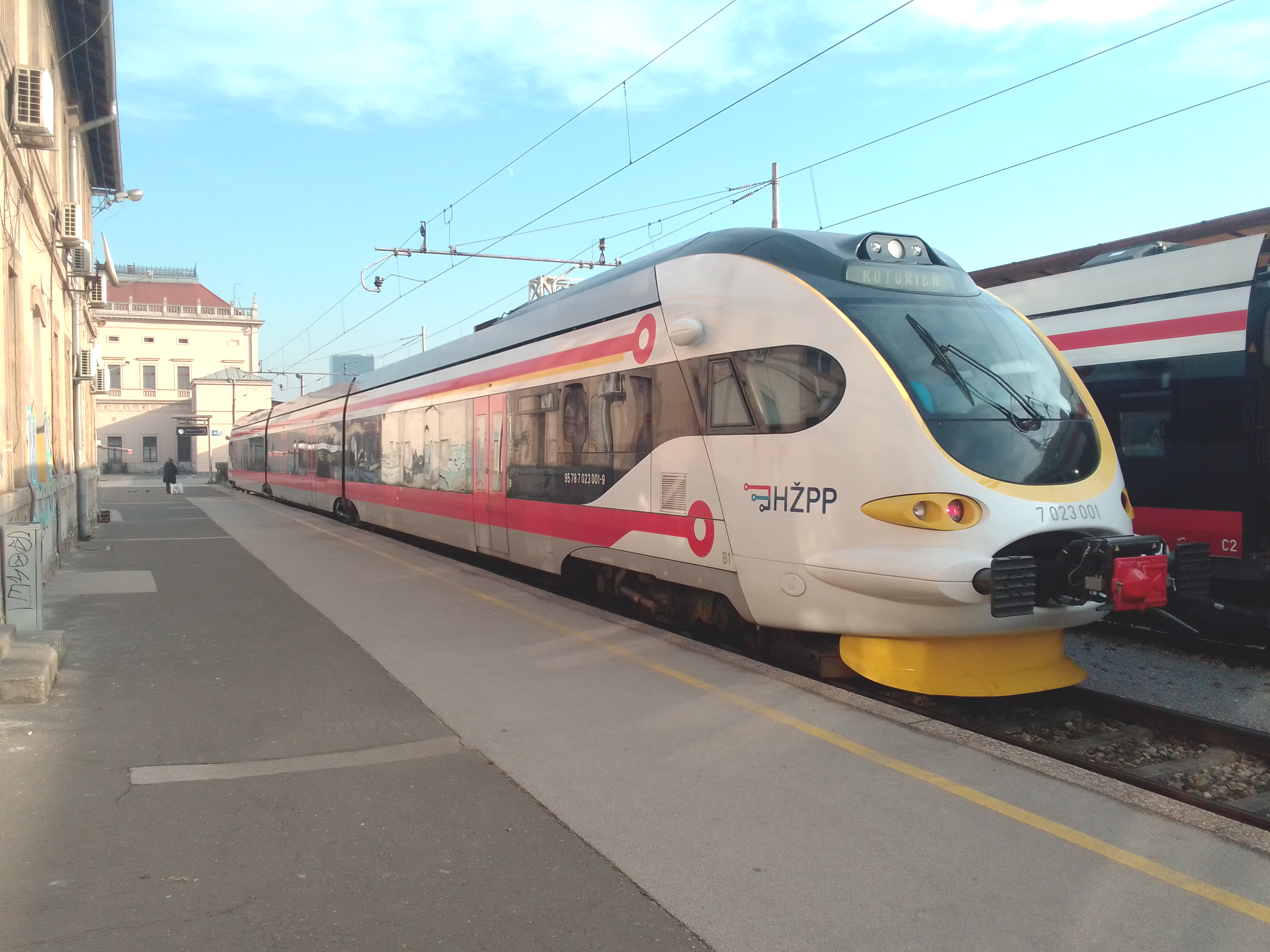
DMU 7023 at Zagreb Central station (2020)

Diesel multiple units cover large number of passenger lines in Croatia, which are operated by the national passenger service operator HŽ Putnički prijevoz. On Croatian Railways, DMUs have important role since they cover local, regional and distant lines all across the country. The country's two largest towns, Zagreb and Split, are connected with an inter-city service that is provided by DMU tilting trains "RegioSwinger" (Croatian series 7123) since 2004. Those trains may also cover other lines in the country, depending on need and availability.

Luxury DMU series 7021, built in France, started to operate for Yugoslav Railways in 1972 and, after 1991, still remained in service of Croatian Railways until 2005. Units 7121 and 7122 (which came as a replacement for 7221 units), together with the newest series 7022 and 7023 built in 2010s Croatia, cover many of the country's local and regional services on unelectrified or partly electrified lines.

==== Czech Republic ====
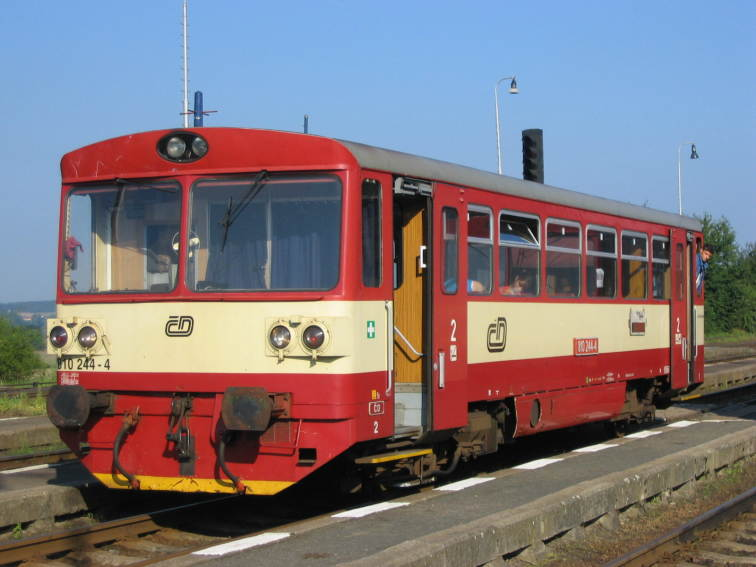
ČD Class 810

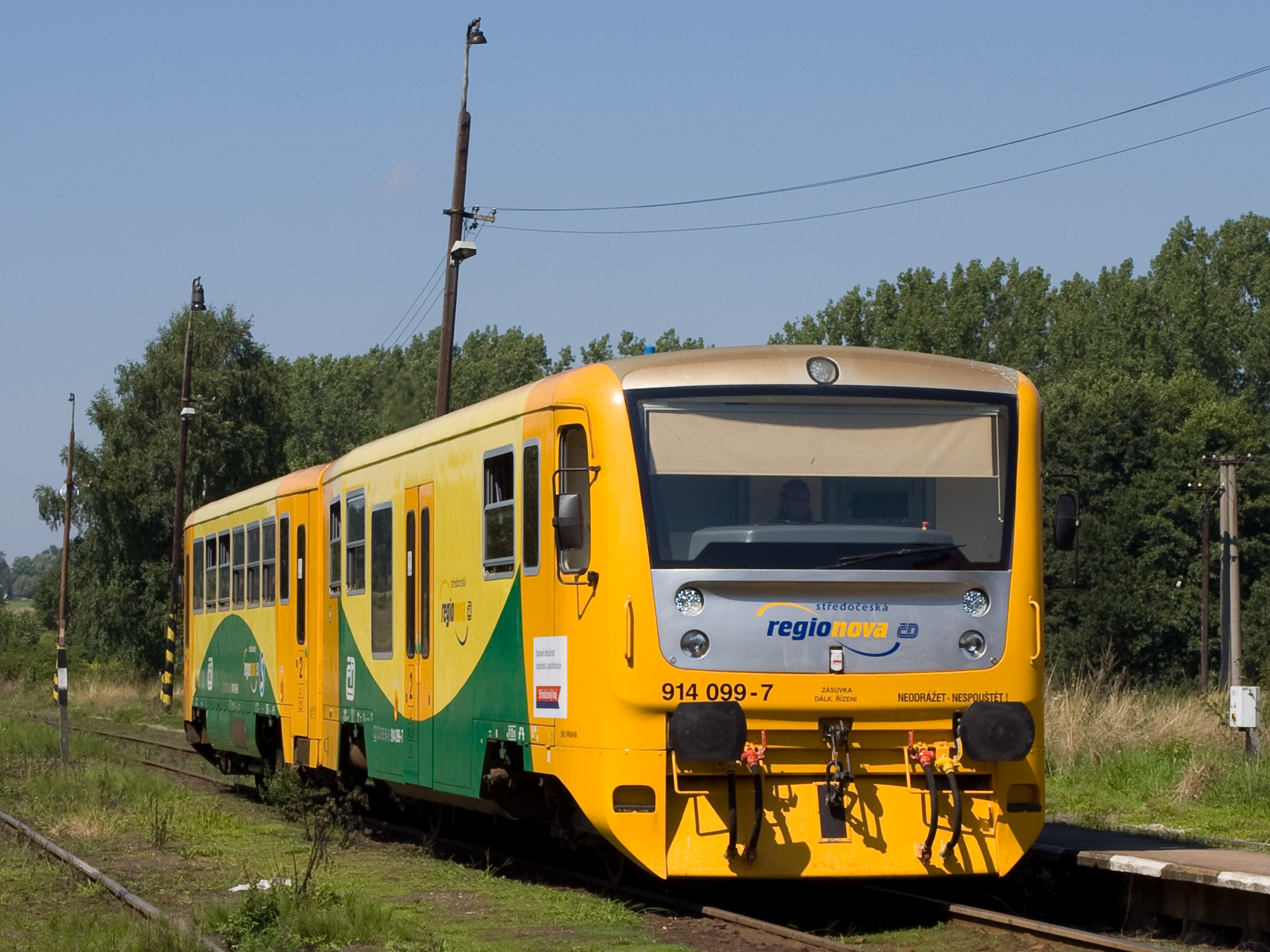
ČD Class 814

Diesel multiple units also cover large number of passenger lines in the Czech Republic which are operated by the national operator České dráhy. They have an important role since they cover local, regional and distant lines all across the country. Those trains may also cover other lines in the country depending on need and availability too.

Also, the DMUs were manufactured for foreign carriers. The tables of cars and units are divided into vehicles operated until 1987, when the ČSD used the series designations proposed by Vojtěch Kryšpín, and vehicles created after this date, which no longer have Kryšpín's designations (with some exceptions). In addition, these new cars are the new vehicles are already different in both countries.

==== Estonia ====
Elron has since 2015 a Stadler FLIRT fleet, with 20 trains DEMU version.

==== Germany ====
Germany has employed DMUs for both commuter and express services for many decades. The SVT 877 Fliegender Hamburger DMU introduced in 1933 made the run from Berlin to Hamburg in a record-setting 138 minutes, and its derivative SVT 137 broke the land speed record in 1936. After World War II, the VT 11.5 DMU was the flagship of the glamorous Trans Europ Express.

Since 1968, Deutsche Bahn (DB) has designated DMUs with class numbers beginning in 6. While DB and regional transport authorities generally prefer electric power for commuter rail, many local and rural lines remain unelectrified and DMUs are needed for those areas. DMUs in service as of 2021 include the Adtranz Class 612 tilting train ("Regio Swinger"), the Alstom Coradia LINT (Classes 620–623, 640 and 648), the Siemens Desiro (Class 642) and the Bombardier Talent (Class 643/644). From 2001 to 2016 there was even a DMU version of DB's high-speed Intercity Express, the Class 605 ICE TD.

==== Greece ====
- Diakopto–Kalavryta railway

==== Ireland ====
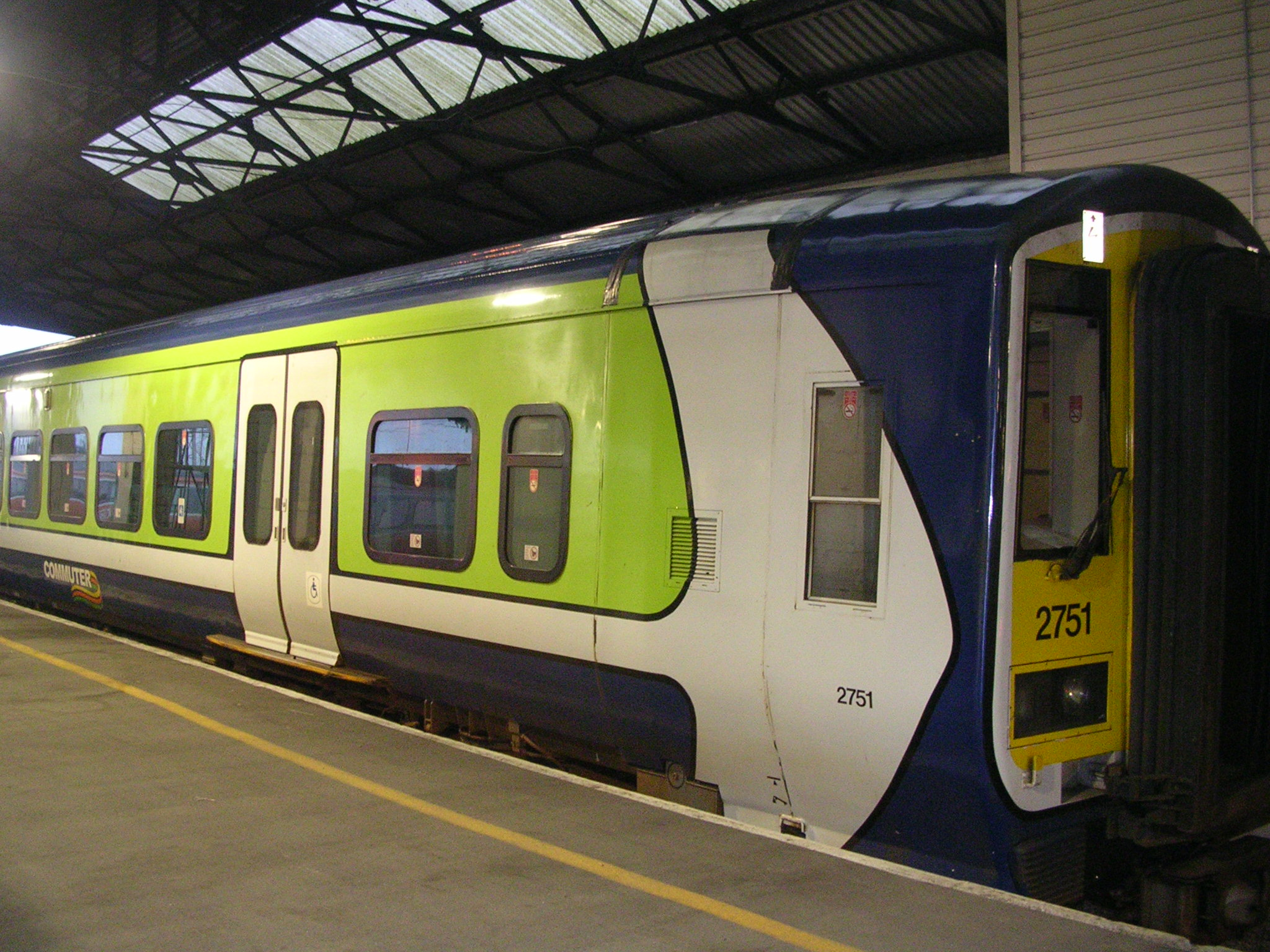
Iarnród Éireann DMU 2751 at Limerick Colbert station, 2006

In the Republic of Ireland, the Córas Iompair Éireann (CIÉ), which controlled the republic's railways between 1945 and 1986, introduced DMUs in the mid-1950s and they were the first diesel trains on many main lines.

==== Italy ====
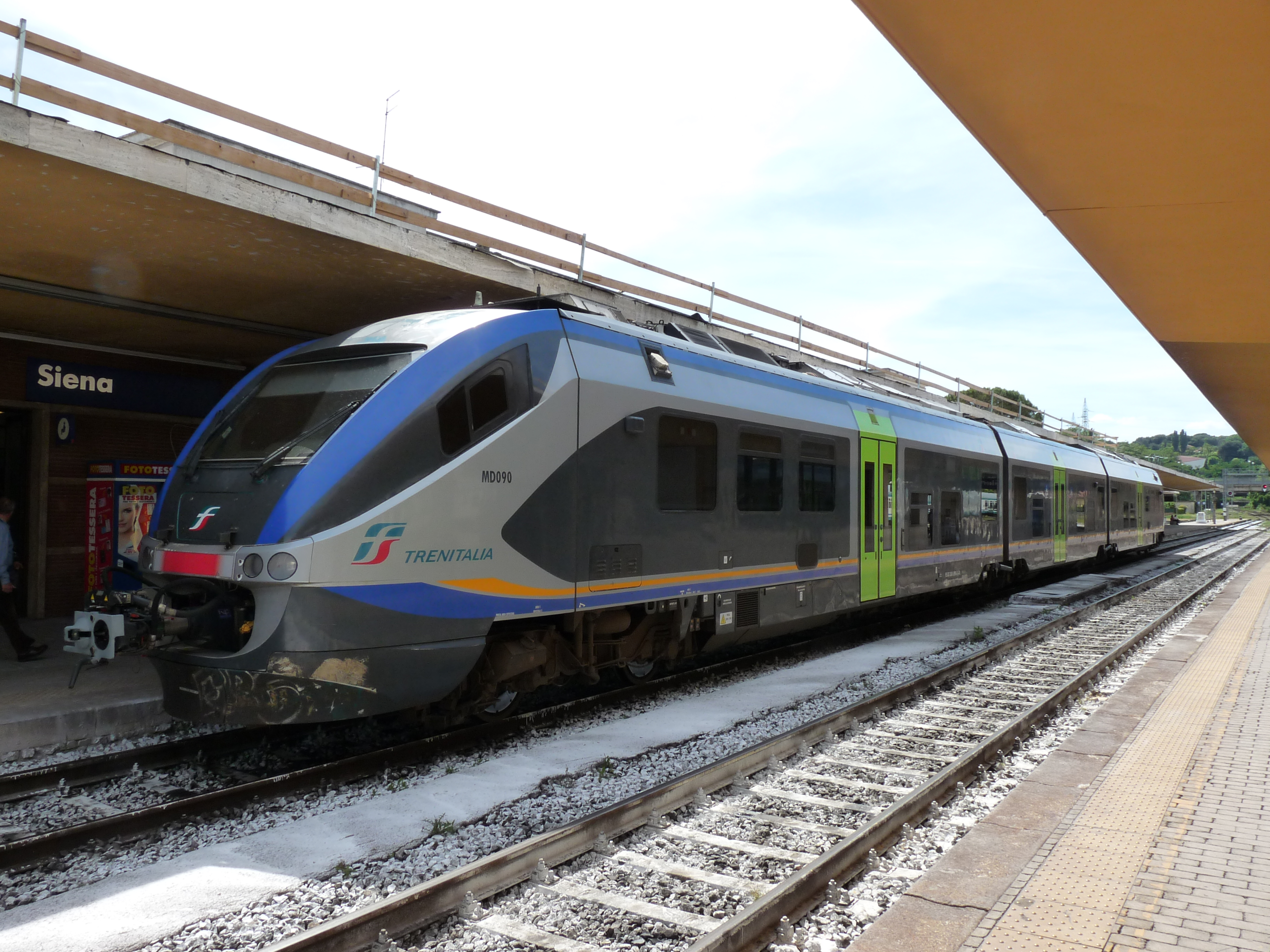
ALn501 Minuetto at Siena railway station (2018)

DMUs were introduced in Italy around the 1930s, when Fiat produced the first unit of the ATR 100 series; this was a fixed-composition train that was innovative for the time, equipped with two diesel-powered extreme traction units with a trailered intermediate unit. DMUs are still used today but thanks to heavy electrification works a lot of lines in the southern part of the country and almost all of them in the northern part now run electric trains. Despite this and overall quick adaptation of new technology, DMMUs are still used today, specifically the FS Class ALn 668 and derivatives: the Class 663 and Class 776, used for regular service respectively up to mid 2025, mid 2026, and still currently running thanks to the extreme reliability of the units.

In 2017, due to most services being only partially under non-electrified tracks, Trenitalia started a tender process for a new, EMU/DEMU hybrid train, eventually leading to the creation of the FS Class HTR 312 and 412; the 3/4 car long train got named "Blues", running a triple hybrid system: Electric/Diesel-Electric/Battery Multiple Unit, notably this is also the first diesel powered train in Trenitalia's rolling stock to reach 160 Km/h, previously been standard for only EMUs, tho only managing this speed when assisted by the limited battery range. Since 2025 some specific 4 car units aimed towards InterCity service dropped the DEMU module, exchanging it for more batteries.

Subsidiaries of Trenitalia have also gotten DMUs for specific regional needs, they are often combined with an electric based system, suuch as the ATR 803 hybrid BMU/DMU and the BTR 813 DMU/EMU.

==== Romania ====
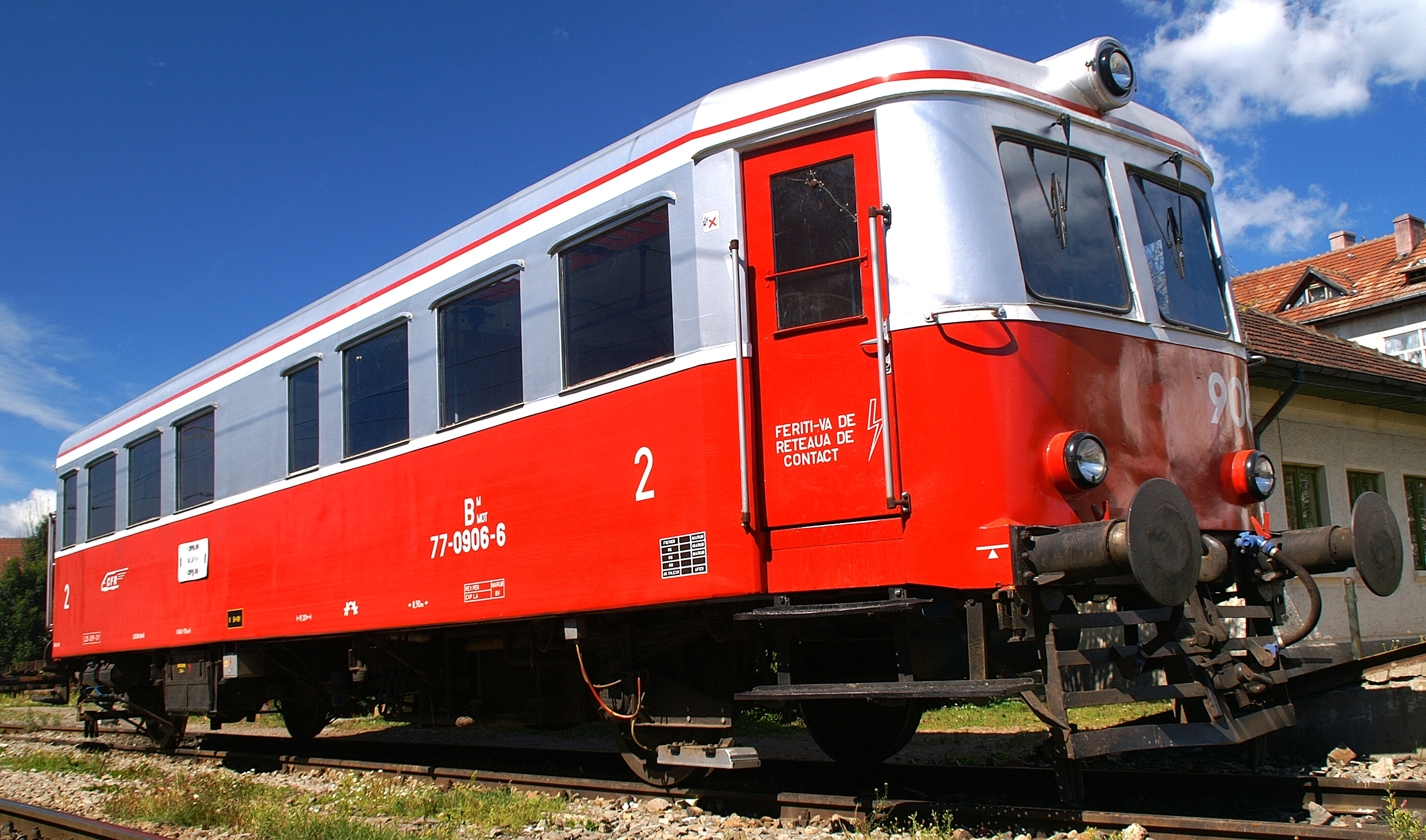
Romanian Class 77 Malaxa DMU in Câmpulung Moldovenesc, 2006

DMUs are used mostly on shorter or less frequently travelled routes in remote areas. The national railway company CFR still uses, along with other DMU models, Class 77 and 78 DMUs, locally built by Malaxa between the 1930s and 50s and refurbished in the 70s. The main DMU in use is the Class 96 Siemens Desiro aka Săgeata Albastră (The Blue Arrow). Private operators also largely use DMU units, mainly purchased from various French and German operators.

==== Slovakia ====
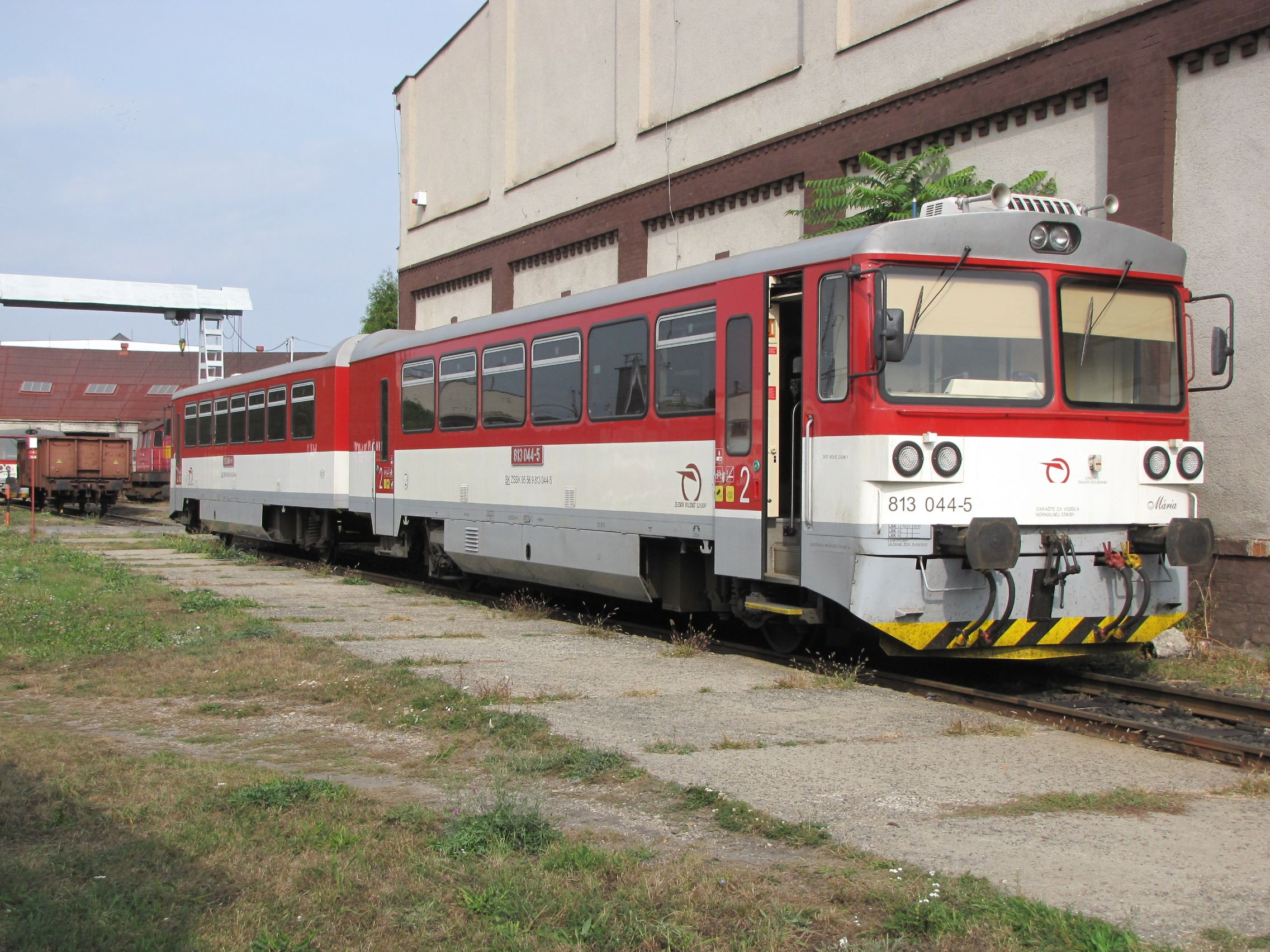
A ZSSK Class 813

Several types of DMUs operate in Slovakia; the most common is the Class 812 ZSSK, based on the ČD Class 810. These are used almost exclusively for hauling passenger trains on non-electrified regional lines and excel at low travel speeds. In the past, there were a number of express trains driven by motor coaches, which often overcame heavier trains driven by steam locomotives at cruising speed. A typical example is the Slovenská strela motor express train, led on the Bratislava-Prague route by a motor car of the same name, or the Tatran express from Bratislava to Košice. Representatives of high-speed motor wagons were motor wagons of the M262 or M286 series, which lost their application in high-speed wagons; this was due to the gradual electrification of main lines and are used for passenger trains.

==== United Kingdom ====
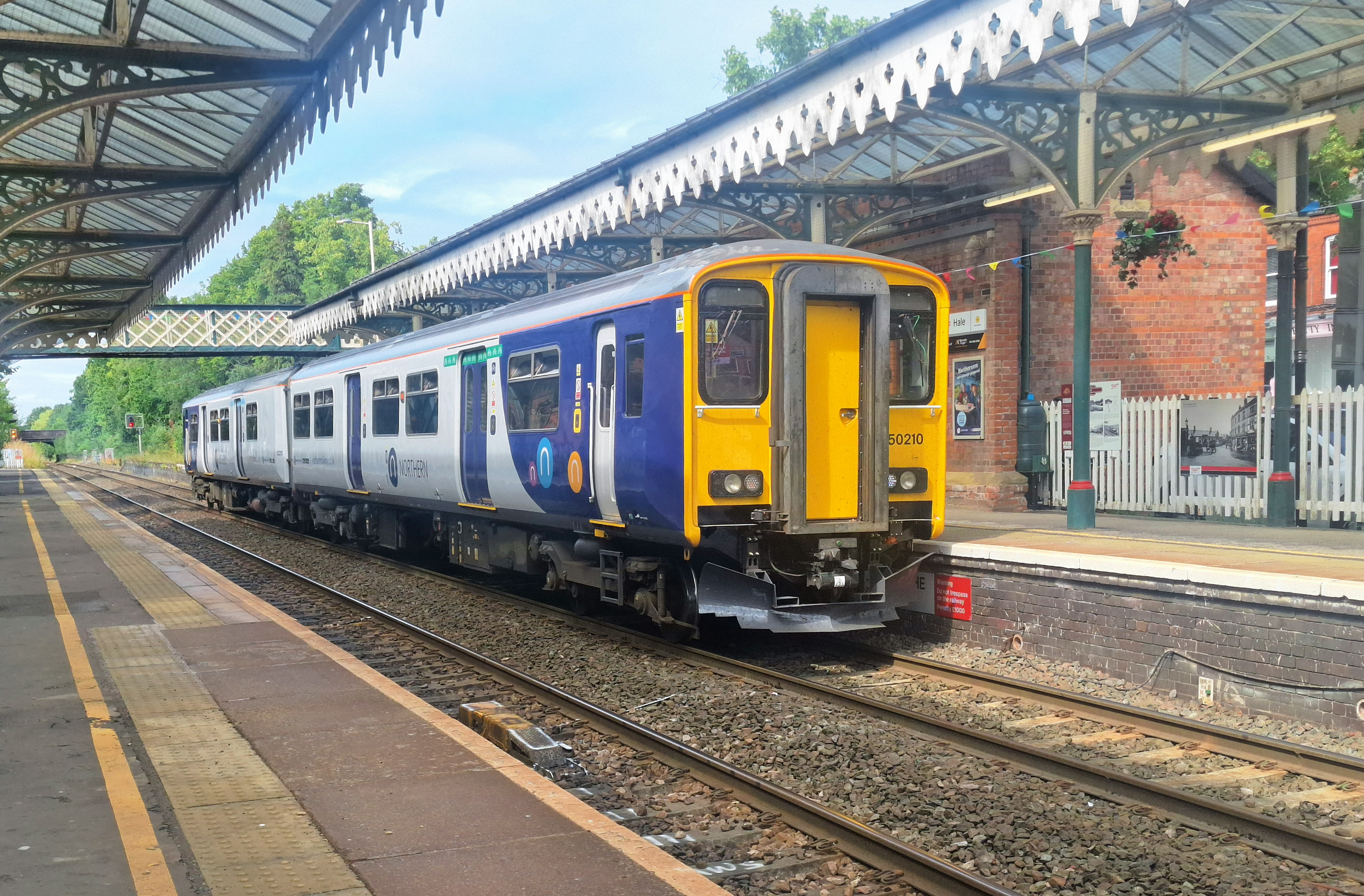
A Northern Trains Class 150 at Hale

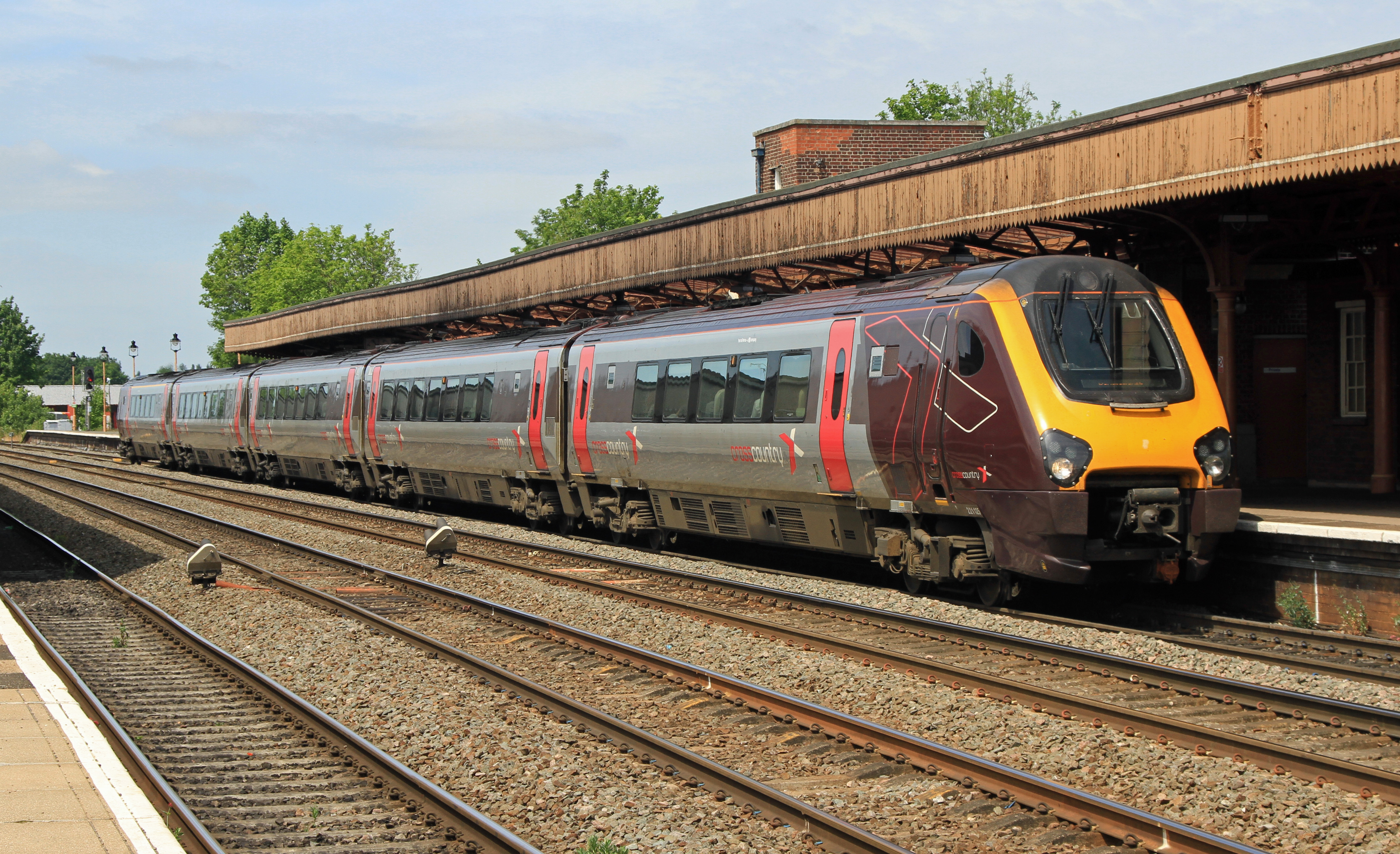
A CrossCountry Class 221 at Leamington Spa

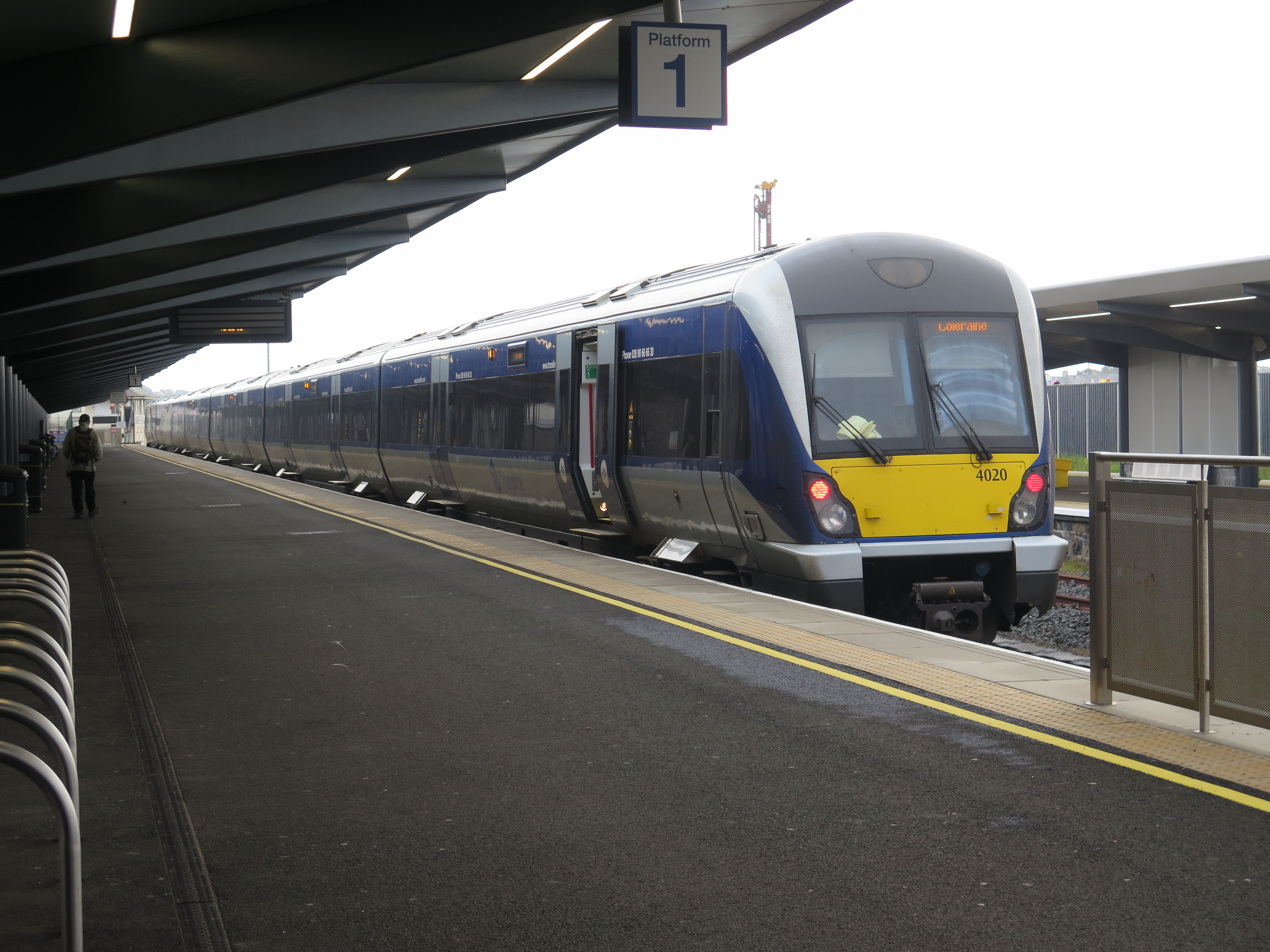
Northern Ireland Railways C4K at Portrush

The first significant use of DMUs in Great Britain was by the Great Western Railway, which introduced its small but successful series of diesel–mechanical GWR railcars in 1934. The London & North Eastern Railway (LNER) and London, Midland & Scottish Railway (LMS) also experimented with DMUs in the 1930s; the LMS both on its own system and on that of its Northern Irish subsidiary, but development was curtailed by World War II.

After nationalisation, British Railways (BR) revived the concept in the early 1950s. At that time, there was an urgent need to move away from expensive steam traction which led to many experimental designs using diesel propulsion and multiple units. The early DMUs proved successful and, under BR's 1955 Modernisation Plan, the building of a large fleet was authorised. These BR first generation DMUs were built between 1956 and 1963.

BR required that contracts for the design and manufacture of new locomotives and rolling stock be split between numerous private firms, as well as BR's own workshops, while different regions laid down different specifications. The result was a multitude of different types, one of which was:

- 'Intercity' units, which were more substantially constructed and shared many features with contemporary hauled coaching stock. They were built for express services on important secondary routes on the Scottish, North Eastern and Western regions.

In 1960, British Railways introduced its Blue Pullman high-speed DEMUs. These were few in number and relatively short-lived, but they paved the way for the very successful InterCity 125 or High Speed Train (HST) units, which were built between 1975 and 1982 to take over most principal express services on non-electrified routes.

These 125 mph (201 km/h) trains run with a streamlined power car at each end and typically seven to nine intermediate trailer cars. Although originally classified as DEMUs, the trailer cars are very similar to locomotive-hauled stock and the power cars were later reclassified as locomotives under Class 43. HSTs started being replaced in 2017 but, as of October 2022, some are still in use.

By the early 1980s, many of the surviving first generation units were reaching the end of their design life, leading to spiralling maintenance costs, poor reliability and a negative public image for the railway. A stop gap solution was to convert some services back to locomotive haulage, as spare locomotives and hauled coaching stock were available, but this also increased operating costs. Commencing in the mid 1980s, British Rail embarked upon its so called "Sprinterisation" programme, to replace most of the first generation DMUs and many locomotive-hauled trains with three new types of DMU:

- Class 140–144 Pacer railbuses, ultra-low-cost diesel–mechanical units (later converted to hydraulic) utilising four-wheeled chassis and lightweight bus bodywork, designed for provincial branch line and stopping services.
- Sprinter a type of diesel–hydraulic DMUs. These fall into three sub-groups; Class 150 Sprinter (for branch line/commuter service), Class 153 / 155 / 156 Super Sprinter (for longer cross country services), and Class 158 / 159 Express Sprinter units (for secondary express services).
- Networker diesel–hydraulic units, of Class 165 Network Turbo (standard commuter version) and Class 166 Network Express (for longer distance commuter services). These took over the remaining non-electric commuter services into London's Marylebone and Paddington stations.

Following the impact of the privatisation of British Rail in the late 1990s, several other DMU types have been introduced:

- Class 168 Clubman and Class 170/Class 171/Class 172 Bombardier Turbostar, a development of the earlier Networkers. These were built by Adtranz and later Bombardier at Derby Litchurch Lane Works; they are the most numerous and widespread of the post-privatisation designs. They were operated by Anglia Railways, Central Trains, Chiltern Railways, London Midland, London Overground Rail Operations, Midland Mainline and ScotRail. All are diesel-hydraulic except for the Class 172, which is diesel-mechanical.
- Class 175 Alstom Coradia diesel-hydraulic multiple units were designed by Alstom, as a rival to the Class 170 Turbostar, but are operated only by First North Western
- Class 180 Adelante diesel-hydraulic multiple units were an Alstom design for express services, built only for First Great Western
- Class 185 Siemens Desiro, built by Siemens Mobility and introduced in 2006 by First TransPennine Express
- Class 195/Class 196/Class 197 CAF Civity, built by CAF for Arriva Rail North, West Midlands Trains and Transport for Wales
- Class 220/Class 221/Class 222 Voyagers/Meridian diesel-electric multiple units, built by Bombardier in Bruges for Virgin Trains West Coast, Virgin CrossCountry and Midland Mainline.

In 2018, the first bi and tri-mode electro-diesel multiple units were introduced:

- Class 800 and Class 802 were built by Hitachi for Great Western Railway, Hull Trains, London North Eastern Railway and TransPennine Express
- Class 755 Stadler FLIRT are operated by Greater Anglia
- Class 769 were converted by Brush Traction from Class 319 electric multiple units for Arriva Rail North, Great Western Railway and KeolisAmey Wales
- Class 230 were converted by Vivarail from London Underground D78 Stock for West Midlands Trains and Transport for Wales After the collapse of Vivarail in 2022, the West Midlands units were withdrawn from service.

=== North America ===
==== Canada ====
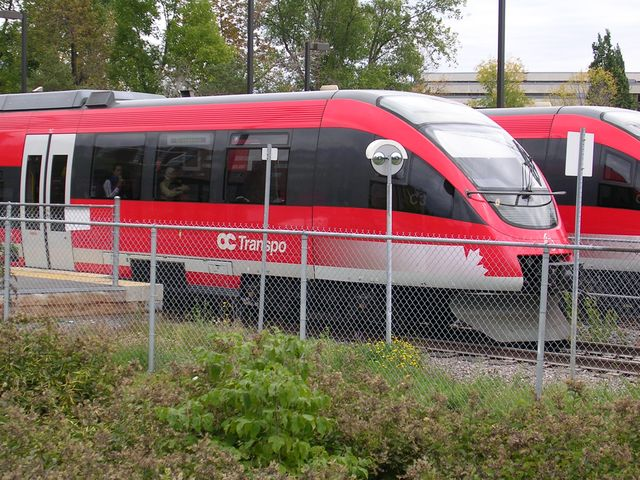
Two Bombardier Talent low-floor DMUs on O-Train Line 2 in Ottawa, Canada

Canada generally follows similar buffer strength requirements to the US, but new services are evaluated on a case-by-case basis. As a result, several types of lightweight DMUs have been used:

- O-Train Line 2 in Ottawa, Ontario uses European-standard Alstom Coradia LINT and Stadler FLIRT’s (previously Bombardier Talent) DMUs on conventional railway tracks under a specific safety agreement with Transport Canada.
- Via Rail operates Budd Rail Diesel Cars on its Sudbury – White River train.
- Réseau Charlevoix (Le Massif) operates a shuttle in the Charlevoix region, Québec, using ex-Deutsche Bahn DB Class 628 units.
- Union Pearson Express uses Nippon Sharyo DMU trains for express service between Union Station and Pearson Airport.

==== Costa Rica ====
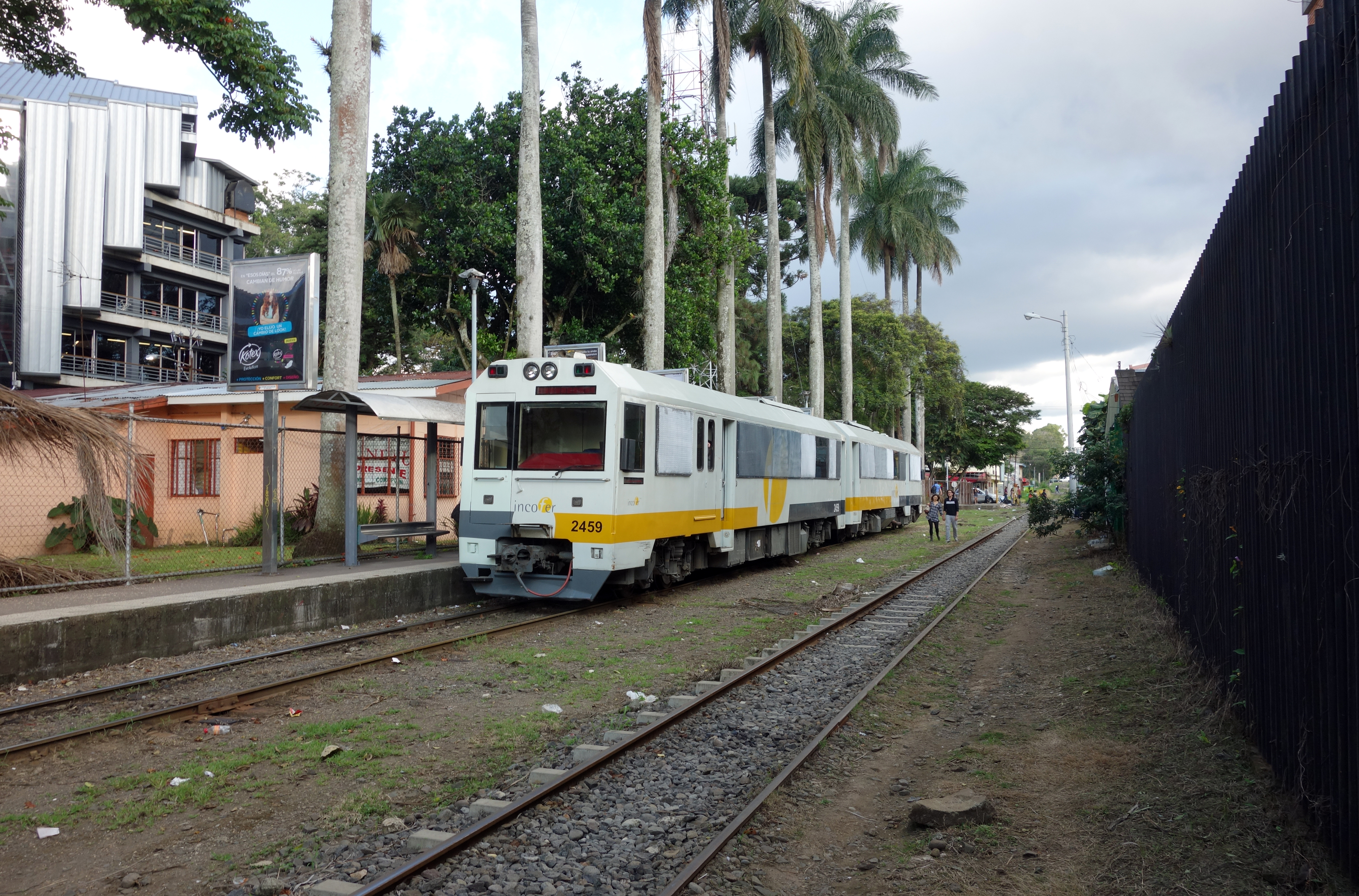
An Apollo 2400 DMU in service in Costa Rica

Costa Rica has purchased several Apolo 2400 series DMU railcars from the former narrow gauge operator in Spain, which are run in commuter service.

==== Mexico ====
42 X'Trapolis Tsíimin K'áak train sets have been ordered for Tren Maya, 10 of which are DMU and 32 are EDMU.

==== United States ====
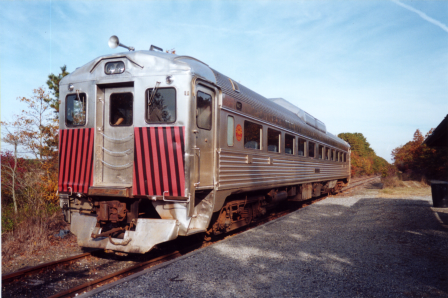
Budd Rail Diesel Car RDC-1 #407 of the Cape May Seashore Lines, New Jersey

A type of DMU is the Budd Rail Diesel Car (RDC). The RDC was a single passenger car, with two diesel engines and two sets of controls.

DMU systems must be FRA-compliant to be permitted on freight rail corridors. The Federal Railway Administration has mandated higher coupling strength requirements than European regulators, effectively prohibiting the use of lighter weight European-style inter-city rail DMUs on main line railways without timesharing with freight operations or special waivers from the FRA. This has greatly restricted the development of DMUs, as no other country requires the much heavier FRA compliant vehicles and no export market for them exists.

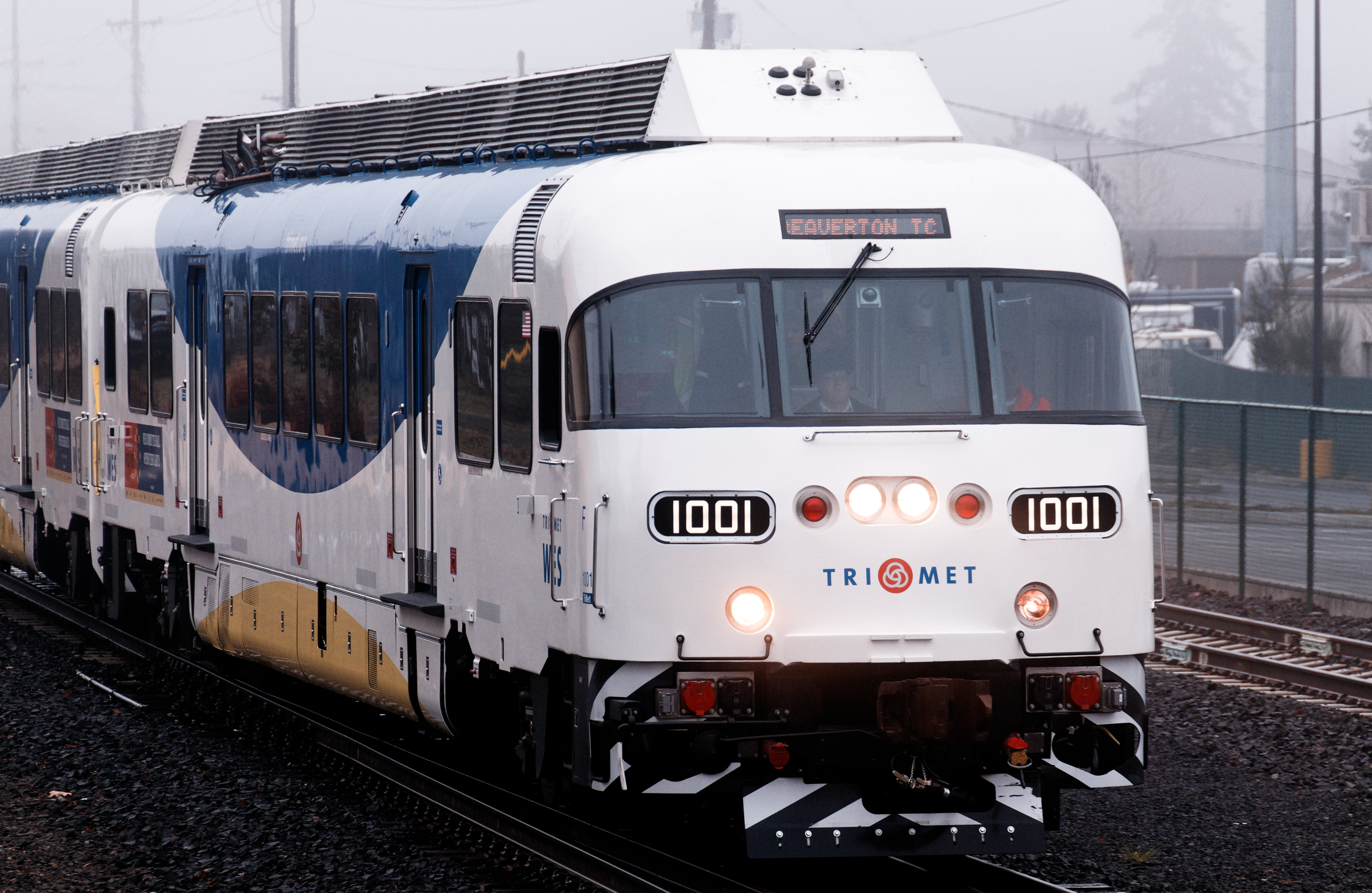
FRA compliant Colorado Railcar DMU of WES Commuter Rail.

Operations using FRA-compliant vehicles:

- Since February 2009, TriMet is using FRA-compliant Colorado Railcar DMUs for its rush-hour WES Commuter Rail service, a suburb-to-suburb line between Beaverton and Wilsonville, Oregon. The opening of the line was delayed from autumn 2008 to early 2009, due to delays in supplying the vehicles. TriMet also has four refurbished former Alaska RR and Trinity Railway Express RDCs, as backup trainsets for when one or more Colorado Railcar DMUs is out of service.
- Sonoma–Marin Area Rail Transit, also referred to as SMART, operates Nippon Sharyo DMUs (the same as those in Toronto) on its route between Larkspur and Santa Rosa, California. Service commenced in 2017.
- Anchorage Mat-Su area – As part of a joint U.S. Forest Service (USFS) and ARRC Chugach Forest Whistle Stop project, a self-propelled rail car was purchased and delivered spring 2009. The DMU may be available for flexible demonstration service during winter months. This unit, a Colorado Railcar DMU numbered Alaska Railroad 751, is used on the Glacier Discovery.

Operations using non FRA-compliant vehicles:

- Capital Metro uses Stadler GTW cars to operate Capital MetroRail, a commuter rail line serving the Greater Austin, Texas area.
- In Denton County, Texas, DCTA also uses Stadler GTW cars to operate its A-train service. DCTA has secured from the FRA the first-ever alternative vehicle technology waiver to use these cars on active freight corridors.

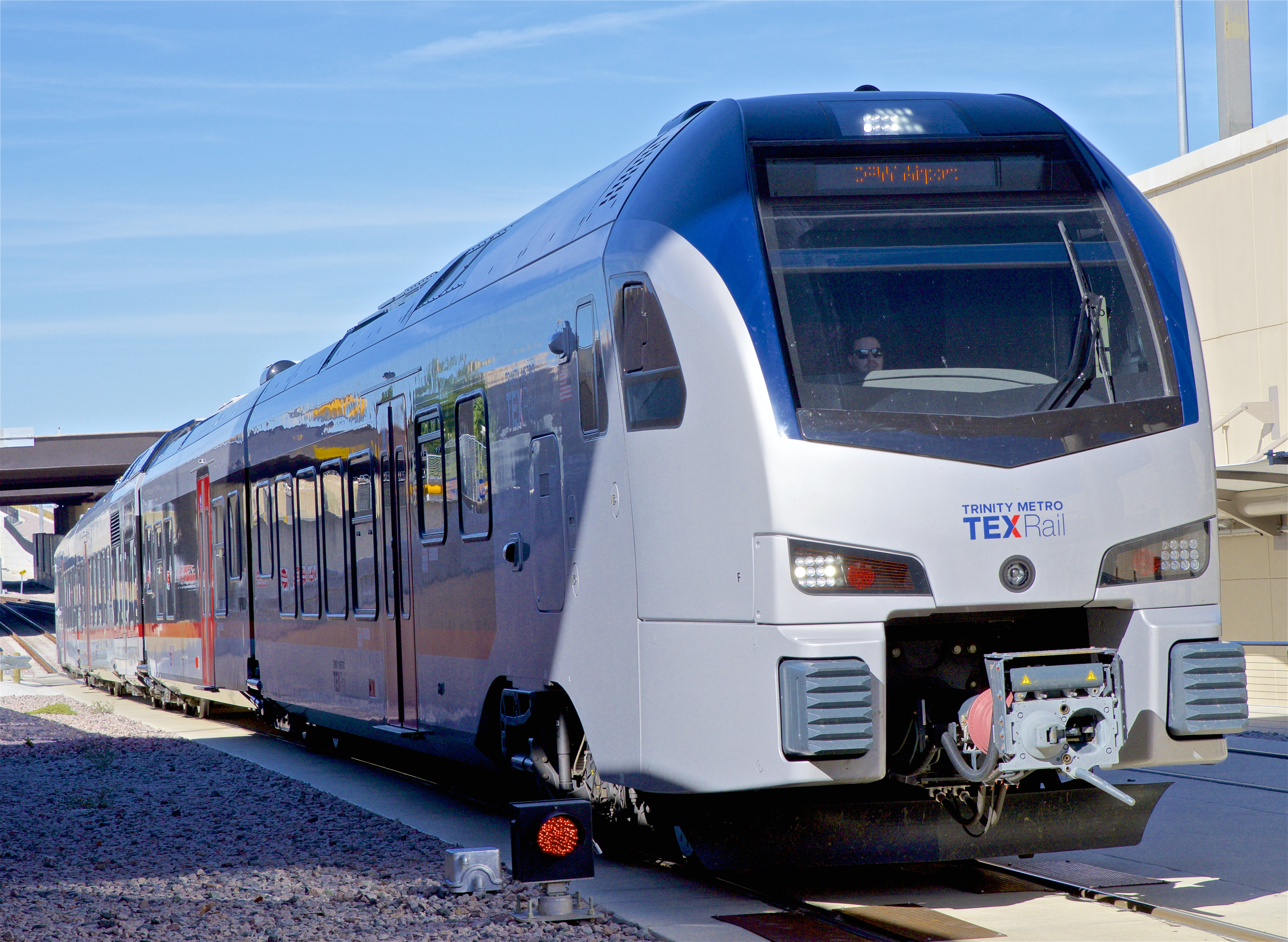
A Stadler FLIRT, owned by TEXRail

- TEXRail in Tarrant County, Texas is a commuter rail line operated by Trinity Metro, which uses Stadler FLIRT DMUs. The vehicles are FRA Alternate Compliant. The line has nine stops, with termini at DFW Airport and T&P Station.
- NJ Transit operates the River Line from Camden, NJ to Trenton, NJ, every 15 minutes during peak hours and every 30 minutes at other times. It uses modified Stadler GTW trains of one or two cars. The line is classified as light rail because it utilises imported European-made DMUs that do not meet FRA crash guidelines. The cars may not operate with the freight rail service that shares the line, so evening operating hours are restricted to Saturday nights. This line currently carries over 7,500 passengers on a typical weekday, exceeding expectations.
- NCTD operates the Sprinter line using Desiro Classic DMUs built by Siemens. Opened March 2008, The line operates every half-hour daily, except limitations in the morning and at night on Saturday, Sunday and on holidays. The line runs from Oceanside, California, where transfer is possible with Coaster commuter rail service to San Diego, to Escondido, California. Like the NJT River Line, it is classified as light rail due to the use of European made DMUs, but does not run at a more typical light rail frequency.
- The eBART expansion of the Bay Area Rapid Transit system implements Stadler GTW DMU train service from Pittsburg/Bay Point station east along the Highway 4 corridor to the town of Antioch. Future expansions in this direction could also connect the eBART service to Oakley, Brentwood, Byron, and beyond to Tracy and Stockton. The DMU system was chosen as a less-expensive alternative to the existing third-rail BART design. Service began on 25 May 2018.
- Arrow utilises Stadler FLIRT trainsets along its service route in Redlands, California.
- Dallas Area Rapid Transit has rebuilt part of the St. Louis Southwestern Railway as the Silver Line, using Stadler FLIRT units.

Proposed operations:

- The Los Angeles County Metropolitan Transportation Authority approved an allocation of $250,000 for a feasibility study of DMUs for "future transportation options for the region" on 5 July 2006 (Ara Najarian, Metro Board Member).
- Chicago's commuter rail line, Metra, is studying the use of DMUs on its newly proposed lines (STAR line, SES). They claim these DMUs will have better acceleration, be more fuel efficient, and seat more customers than the current diesel locomotive and double decker railcars that are currently in use.
- Seattle area – The Central Puget Sound's regional transit agency Sound Transit, along with the Puget Sound Regional Council evaluated the feasibility of both DMU and diesel locomotive technology for operation in the Eastside BNSF Corridor in response to a state legislative request. The Eastside BNSF corridor runs from the City of Snohomish in the north to Renton in the south of the metro area. Sound Transit has no plans to operate passenger rail service in the eastside BNSF corridor, but has committed limited funds to provide capital improvements in the event another public or private operator proposes to operate the service.
- The Long Island Rail Road, the busiest commuter railroad in the United States, is exploring the possibility of operating DMUs on some of its lesser traveled routes in non-electrified territory (on the Montauk, Greenport, Port Jefferson and Oyster Bay branches), where operation of its current fleet of C3 bilevel railcars pulled by DE30AC/DM30AC locomotives is uneconomical and inefficient.
- A proposal to use DMUs on Boston's Fairmount Line was initially approved, but was cancelled in 2016.
- NJ Transit's Passaic–Bergen–Hudson Transit Project is studying the re-introduction passenger service on a portion of the New York, Susquehanna and Western Railway (NYSW) right-of-way in Passiac, Bergen and Hudson counties using newly built, FRA-compliant diesel multiple units.

=== Asia and Australasia ===
==== Australia ====
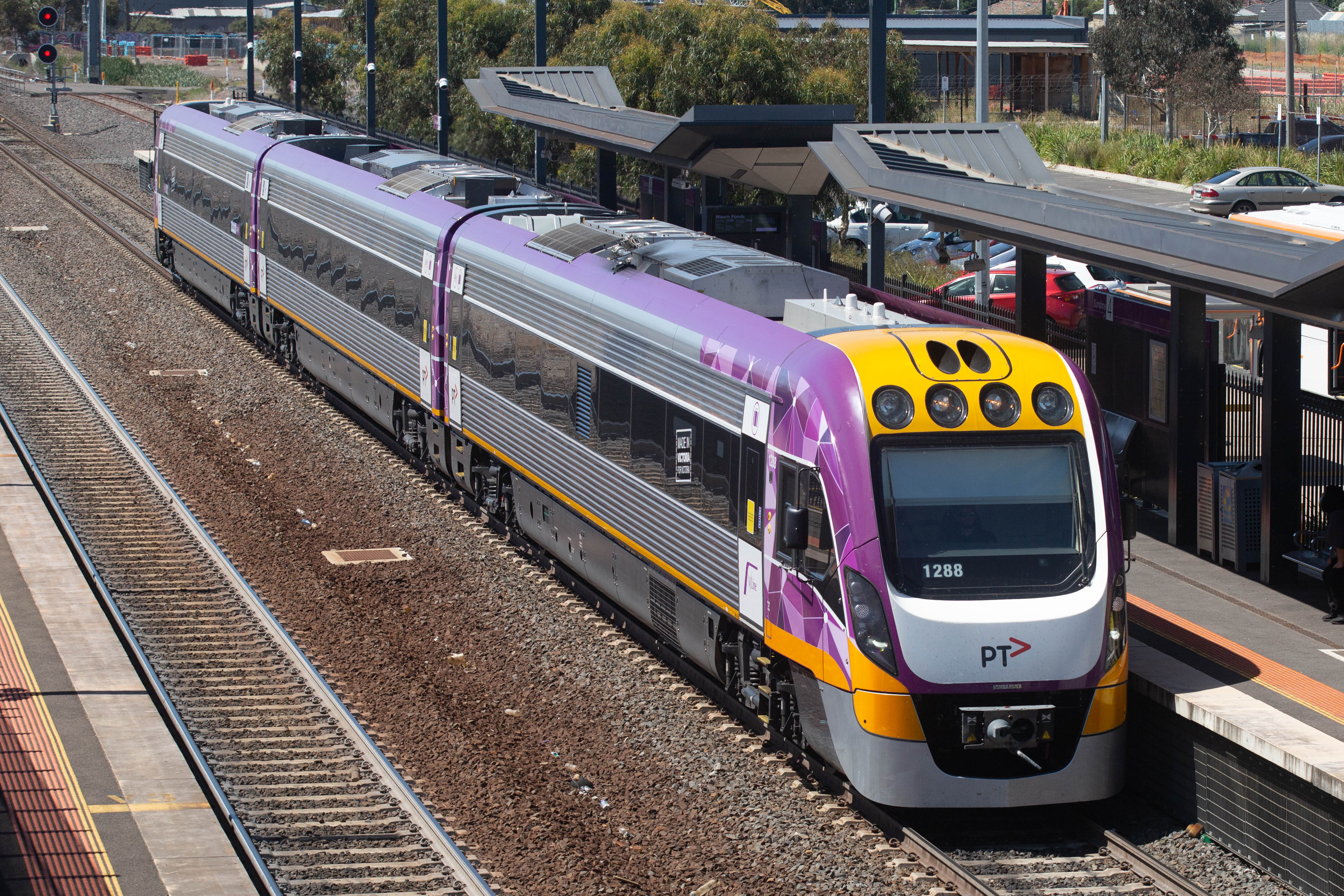
A V/Line VLocity operating in Victoria, Australia

DMUs were first introduced in the mid-20th century for use on quiet branch lines that could not justify a locomotive-hauled service. Today, DMUs are widely used throughout Australia's southern states:

- Adelaide Metro use 3000 class DMUs on their suburban network.
- NSW TrainLink use Xplorer DMUs on services from Sydney to Canberra (ACT), Griffith, Broken Hill, Armidale and Moree. Endeavour DMUs are used on services to Bathurst, Moss Vale and Goulburn on the Southern Highlands Line, Kiama to Bomaderry and on the Hunter Line. Hunter railcar DMUs are also used on the Hunter Line.
- Victoria's V/Line uses Sprinter and V/Locity DMUs on all medium distance services.
- Western Australia's Transwa operates the Prospector, AvonLink and Australind on medium- and long-distance country services.

In Queensland, heritage DMUs are used on the Savannahlander and Gulflander tourist trains.

==== Bangladesh ====
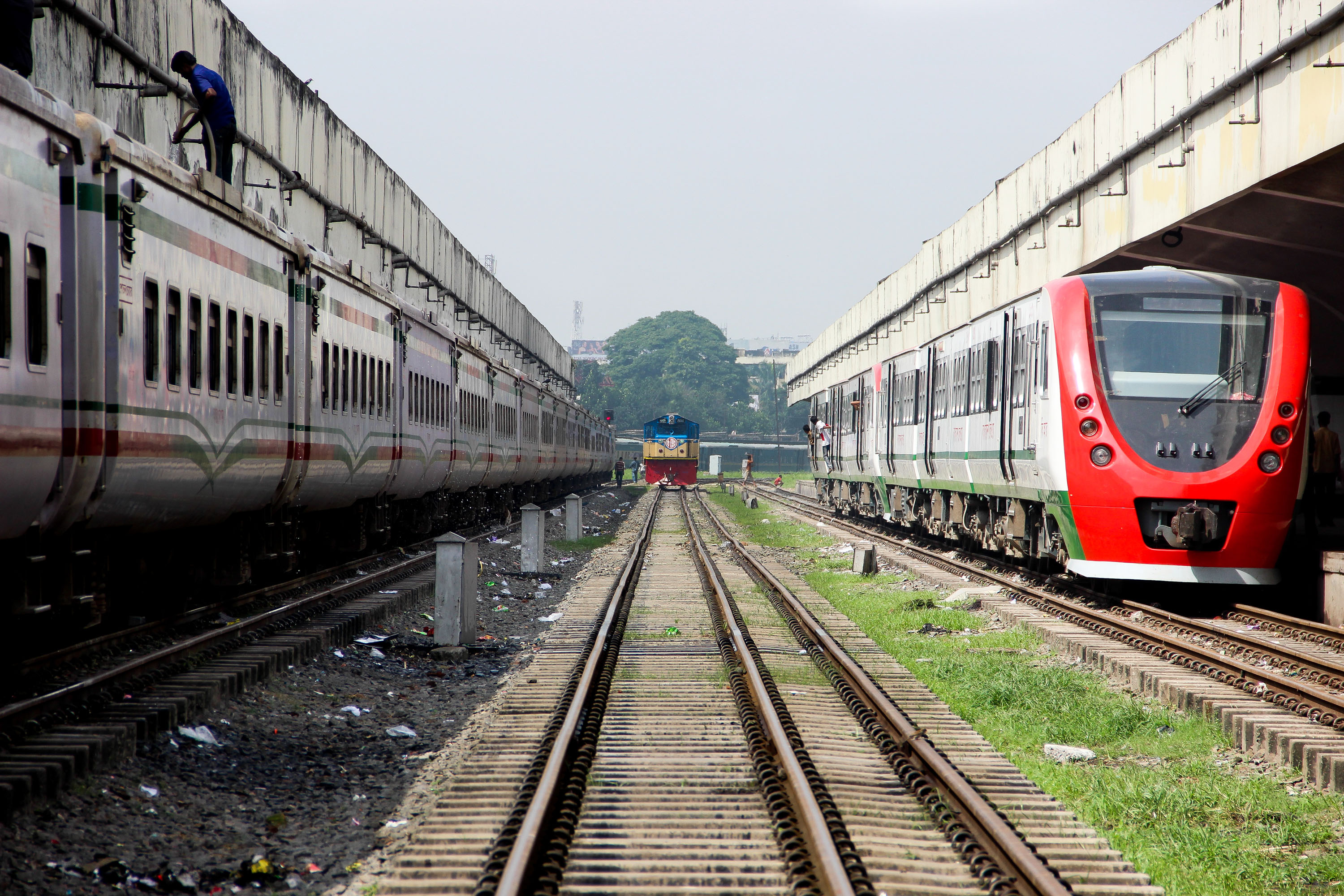
A DEMU train (right) at Kamalapur railway station, Dhaka

Chinese-manufactured (CNR Tangshan) DEMU was introduced in Bangladesh from 25 May 2013. DEMU is the country's first-ever commuter train service starting its journey on the Chittagong–Faujdarhat line. They also operate on the Chittagong Circular Railway and on the Bangladesh Railway's service between Dhaka and Narayanganj. However, these trains faced reliability issues soon after the final delivery in 2015, with all 20 trains becoming inoperable beyond 2018.

In 2020, technicians from Bangladesh Railway were able to repair one of the inoperative trains to working condition. However, the proposed project to repair the rest of the trains were deemed to be too expensive in the long run. By January 2025, after 10 years of service, Bangladesh Railway announced its intention to sell the DEMU trains for scrap.

==== Cambodia ====
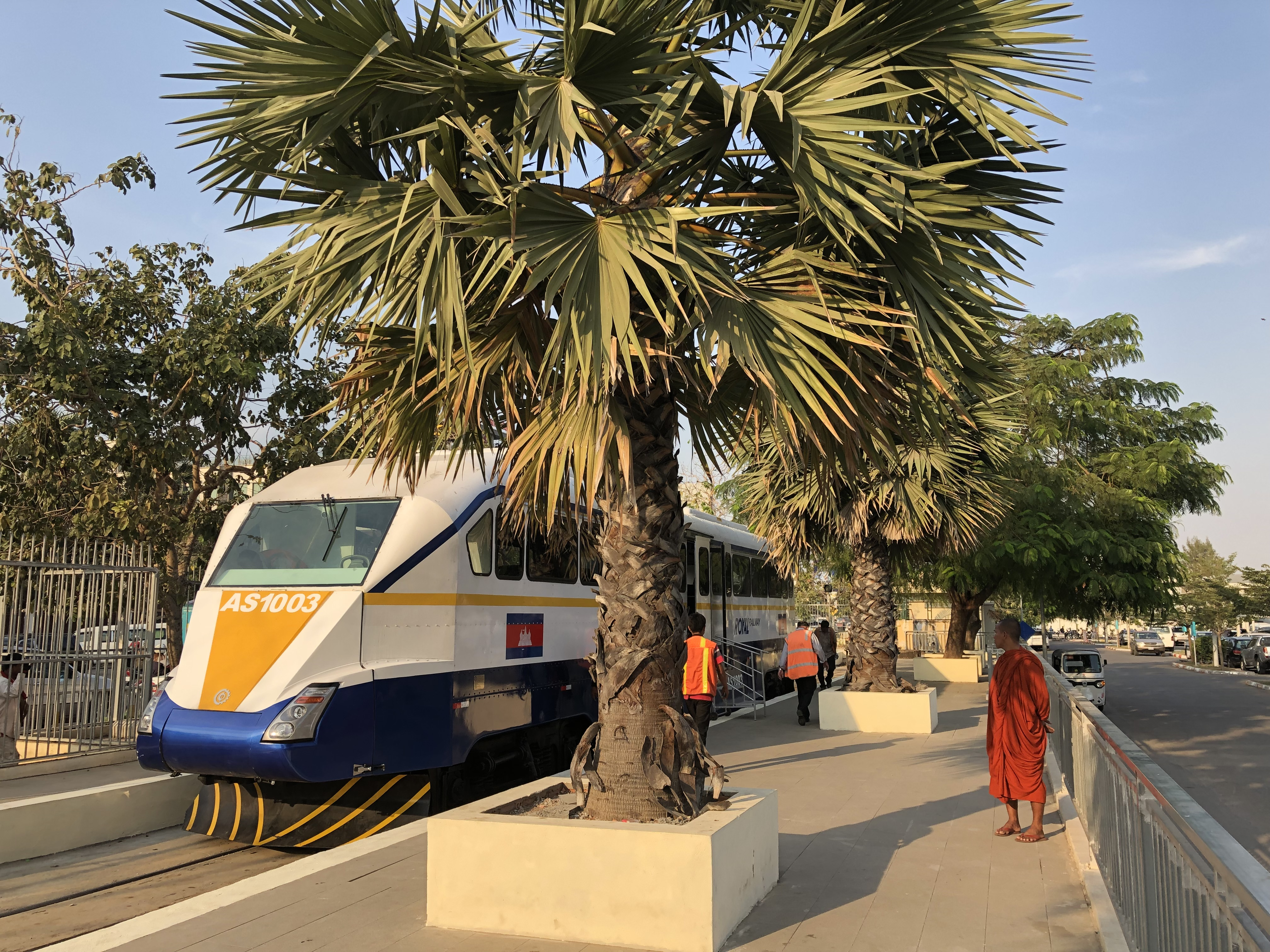
Ferrovias del Bajio DSU at Phom Penh Cambodia Airport

Mexican manufacturer Ferrovias Del Bajio supplied in 2019, three DSUs (Diesel Single Unit) to Royal Railway in Cambodia for their airport shuttle service from Phnom Penh international airport to the city central station. The other two units were assigned to long-distance services from the central station to Sihanoukville and to Poipet. Royal Railways Cambodia have now acquired eleven carriages DMU from Japan. Model: " Kiha 183 heavy snow ". (キハ183系オホーツク・大雪) Speed: 110 km/h (max) Type: 特急 (Limited Express) Started: 1986 ............ End of Service in Japan 17 March 2023

==== China ====
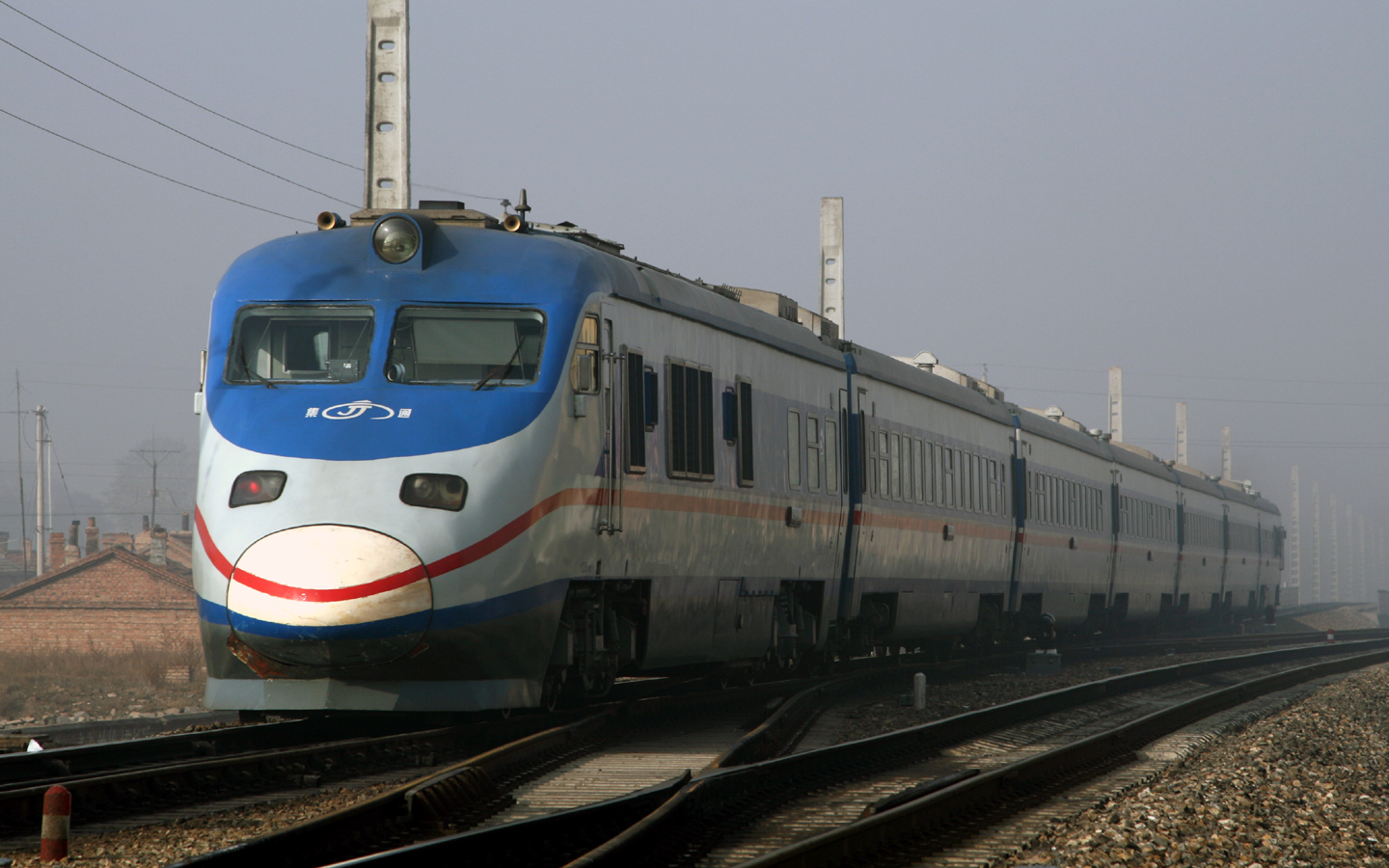
The China Railway NYJ1 DMU used on the Jining–Tongliao railway

The Dongfeng DMU was first Chinese DMUA produced by Qingdao Sifang in 1958.

The China Railway NZJ was China's first double-decker SMUA is an ideal medium- and short-distance rail transport vehicle. It was independently developed and manufactured by Tangshan Works in 1998 and put into operation between Nanchang and Jiujiang in June of that year.

The China Railway NYJ1 was the country's first hydraulic transmission DMU class; it was developed by Qingdao Sifang at the end of 1998; it was placed into operation between Nanchang and Jiujiang, and Nanchang and Ganzhou in February 1999.

The China Railway NZJ1 "New Dawn" higher-speed double-decker DMU was jointly developed by Qishuyan Works and Nanjing Puzhen Works in August 1999; it was placed into commercial operation on the Shanghai-Nanjing Railway in October of that year.

The China Railway NDJ3 "Great Wall", previously labelled the "Harmony Great Wall", is the only higher-speed DMU that is still operating in China. It was first designed to be used for passenger transport in the 2008 Olympic Games and has become a mature technology platform, with export orders to Nigeria, despite initial flaws related to overheating of electrical cables in the power car.

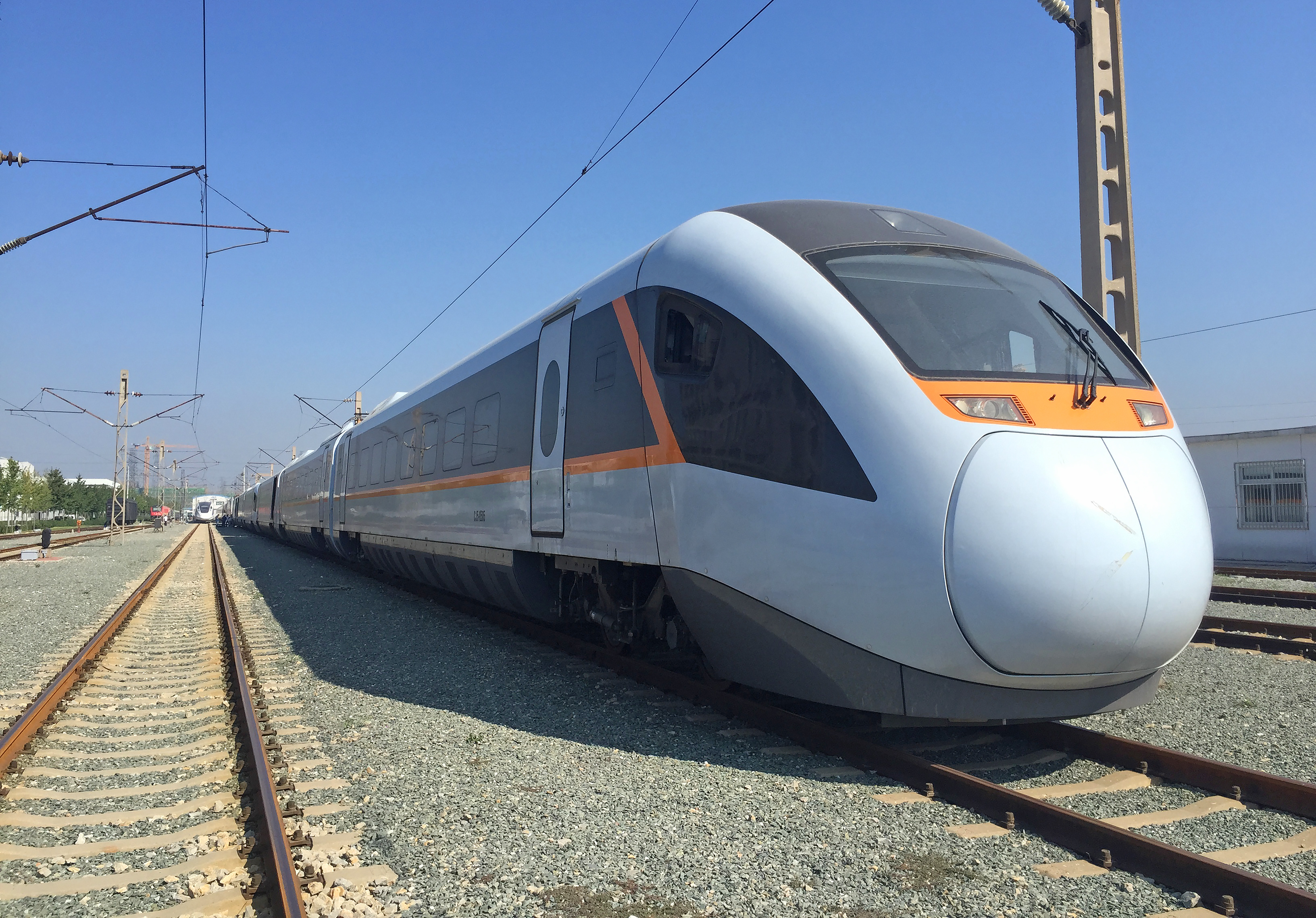
CJ5 (DEMU), used by the Xi'an–Huyi railway

On 14 January 2014, CRRC Changchun Railway Vehicles announced that hybrid-electric multiple units were put into production. At the end of 2014, the first batch of hybrid EMUs, one train each with battery-catenary power supply (EEMU) and catenary power supply-internal combustion engine (DEMU), rolled off the assembly line in Changchun. From 2016 to 2020, the vehicles were tested in Hohhot and Beijing Academy of Railway Sciences.

In September 2022, the first CJ-5 train used by the Xi'an-Huxian Railway arrived in Xi'an. The No. 0506 train, which uses an internal combustion engine and a battery hybrid, was used as a vehicle during the initial operation of the Xi'an-Huxian Railway. During the operation period, it will be temporarily managed by Xi'an Metro.

==== India ====
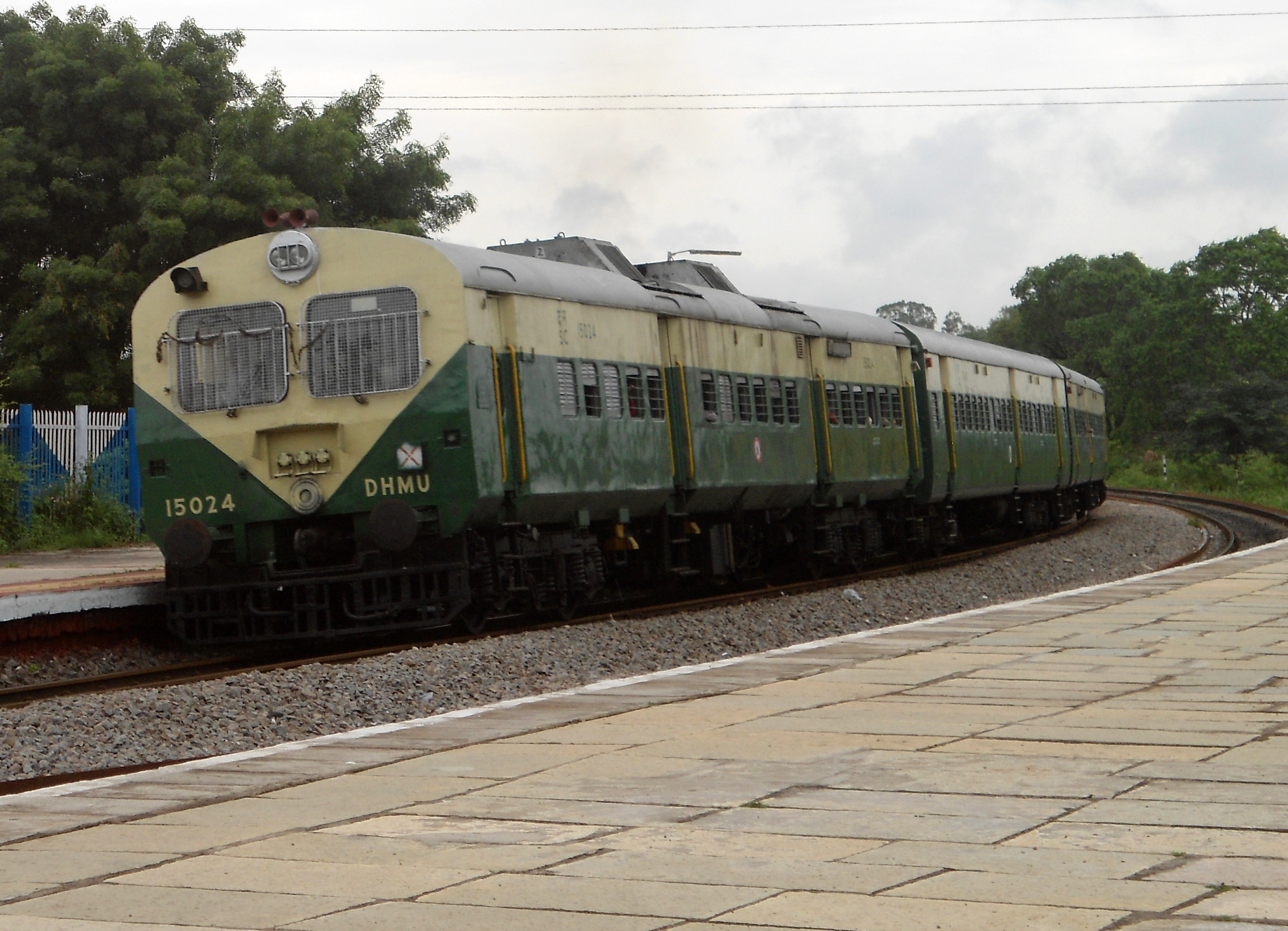
Older First generation DHMU in India

DMUs (particularly DEMUs) are widely used in India. DEMUs in India are used in both the eight-coach format and the four-coach format. These trains replaced many (up to 10 car) trains with a WDM-2 or WDM-3A locomotive in the middle. These old trains had the locomotive controls duplicated in the Driving Trailer coach and all the actuation information reaching the locomotive through thin communication lines. This was called a push-pull train. The longest running such service operated between Diva – Bhiwandi Road and Vasai Road; it was recently converted into an MEMU train service in 2018.

India's first and largest DMU shed at Jalandhar, Punjab, holds more than 90 units placed in service all over Punjab. The DMU services in India have had various different classes. They can be classified as

- First generation DMU:
  - Rated power was 700 HP and had either three or six coaches.
  - Transmission was Voith-hydraulic.
  - Max speed 100 km/h.
  - Made at first at ICF and then at RCF.

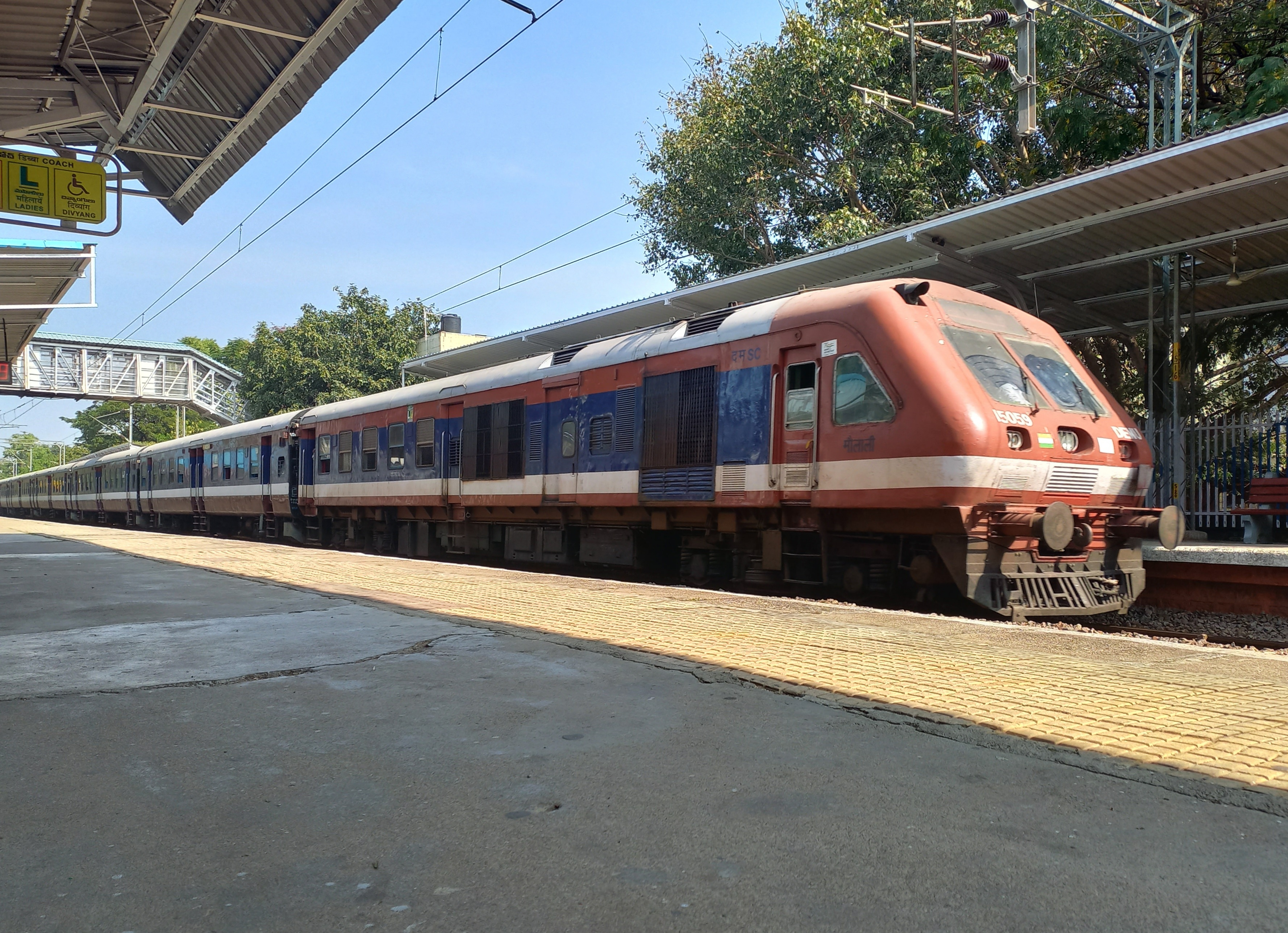
Second generation DEMU train in India

- Second generation DMU:
  - Rated power is 1400 HP and have eight coaches.
  - Max speed is 105 km/h.
  - Transmission is DC electric.
  - Made at ICF and RCF.

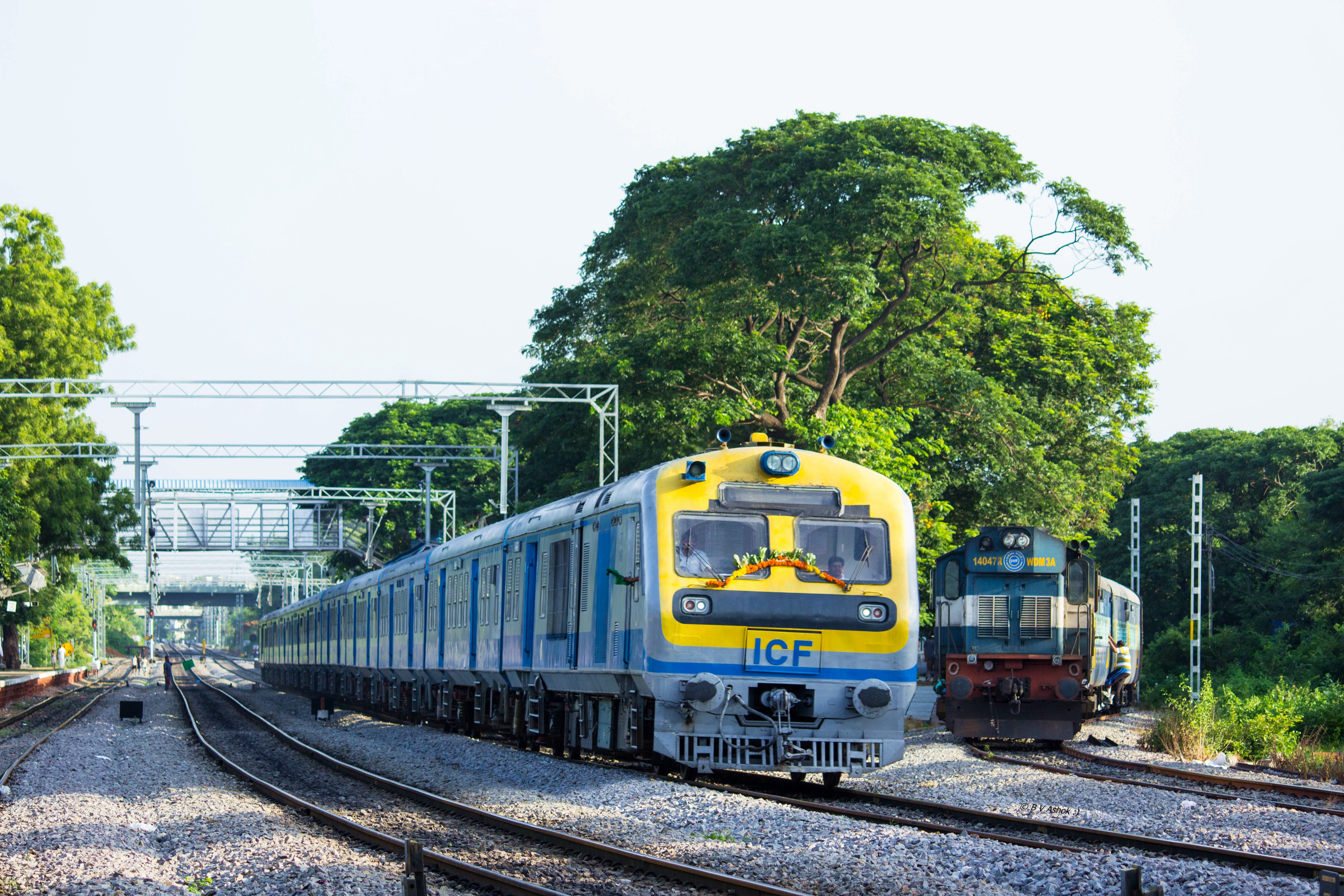
Third Generation Modern DEMU with a WDM-3A locomotive

- Third generation DMU:
  - Rated power is 1,600 HP and have ten coaches.
  - Max speed is 110 km/h.
  - Transmission is AC electric.
  - Made at ICF.

==== Indonesia ====
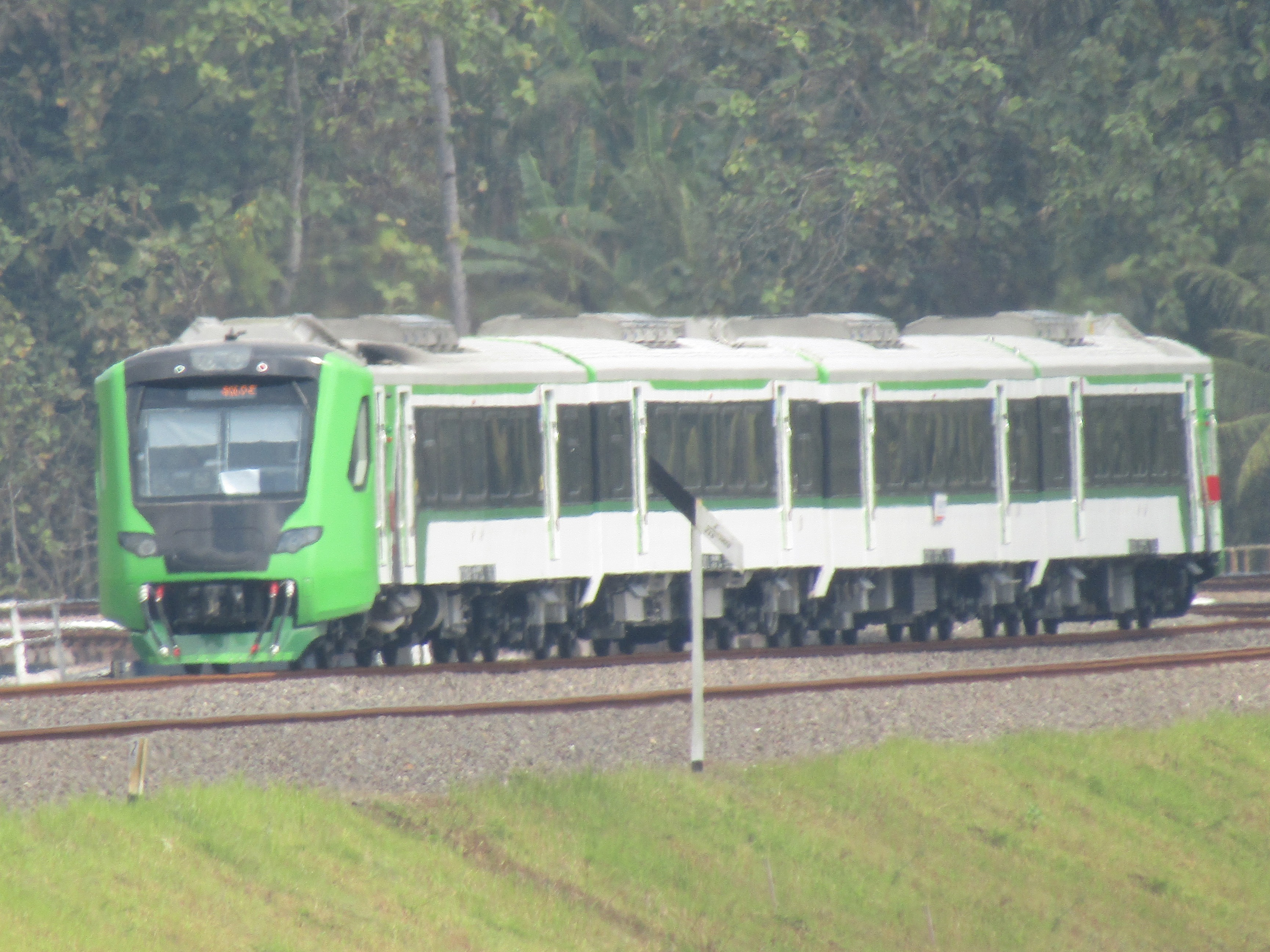
KRDI Solo Express, Surakarta

State-owned company PT.INKA builds several type of DMU, some of which operate in urban and suburban areas.

==== Japan ====
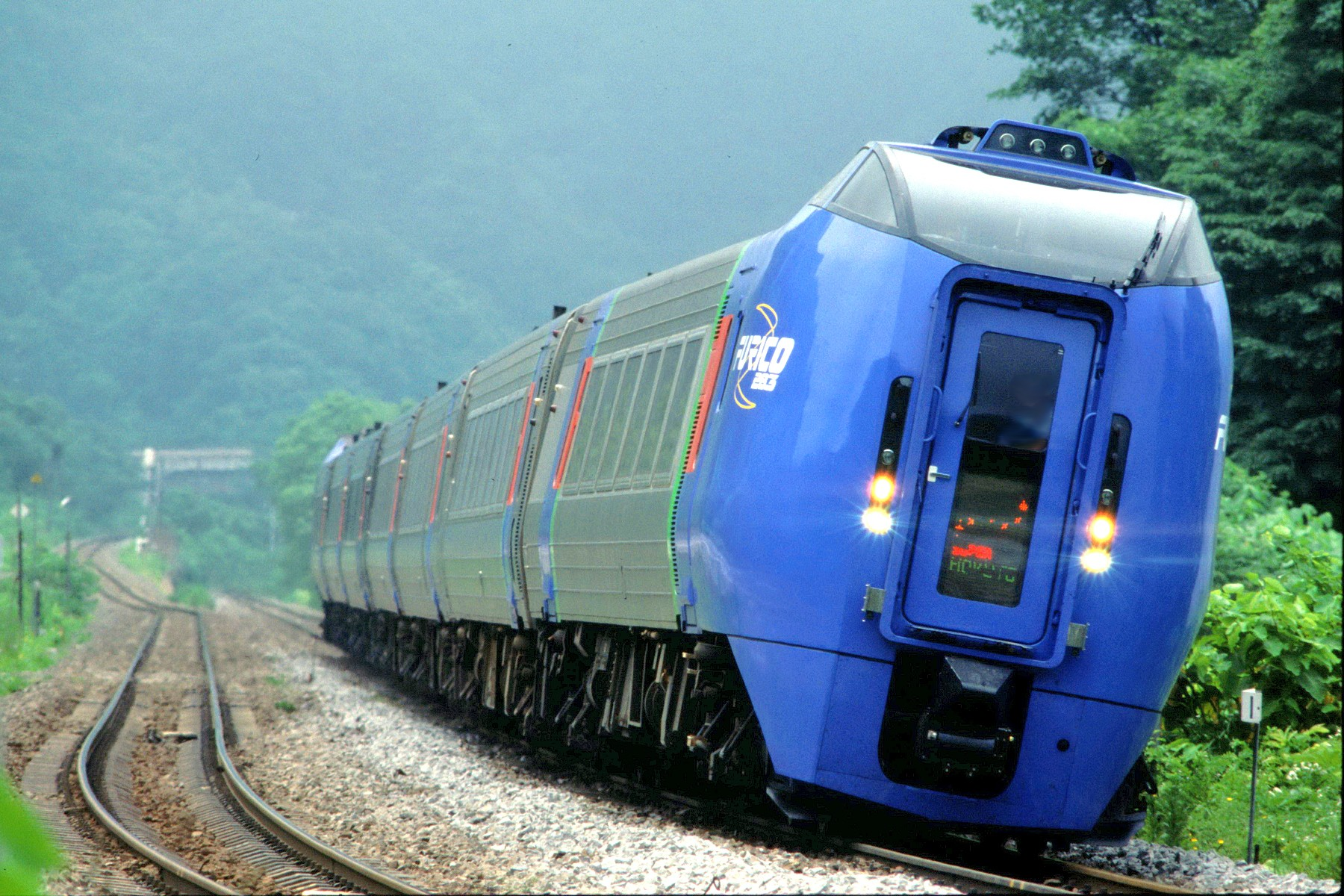
A JR Hokkaido KiHa 283 tilting DMU on Hakodate Main Line

In Japan, where gasoline-driven railbuses (on small private lines) and railmotors (Kihani 5000 of the national railways) had been built since the 1920s, the first two streamlined DMUs came in service in 1937, class Kiha 43000 (キハ43000系).

The service of several hundreds of diesel railcars and DMUs started in the 1950s, following the improvement of fuel supply that was critical during World War II.

==== Kenya ====
In 2021, Kenya acquired DMUs from France to operate in the Nairobi Metropolitan Area. These trains connect the city with settlements outside Nairobi, Jomo Kenyatta International Airport and the Nairobi Terminus.

==== Malaysia ====
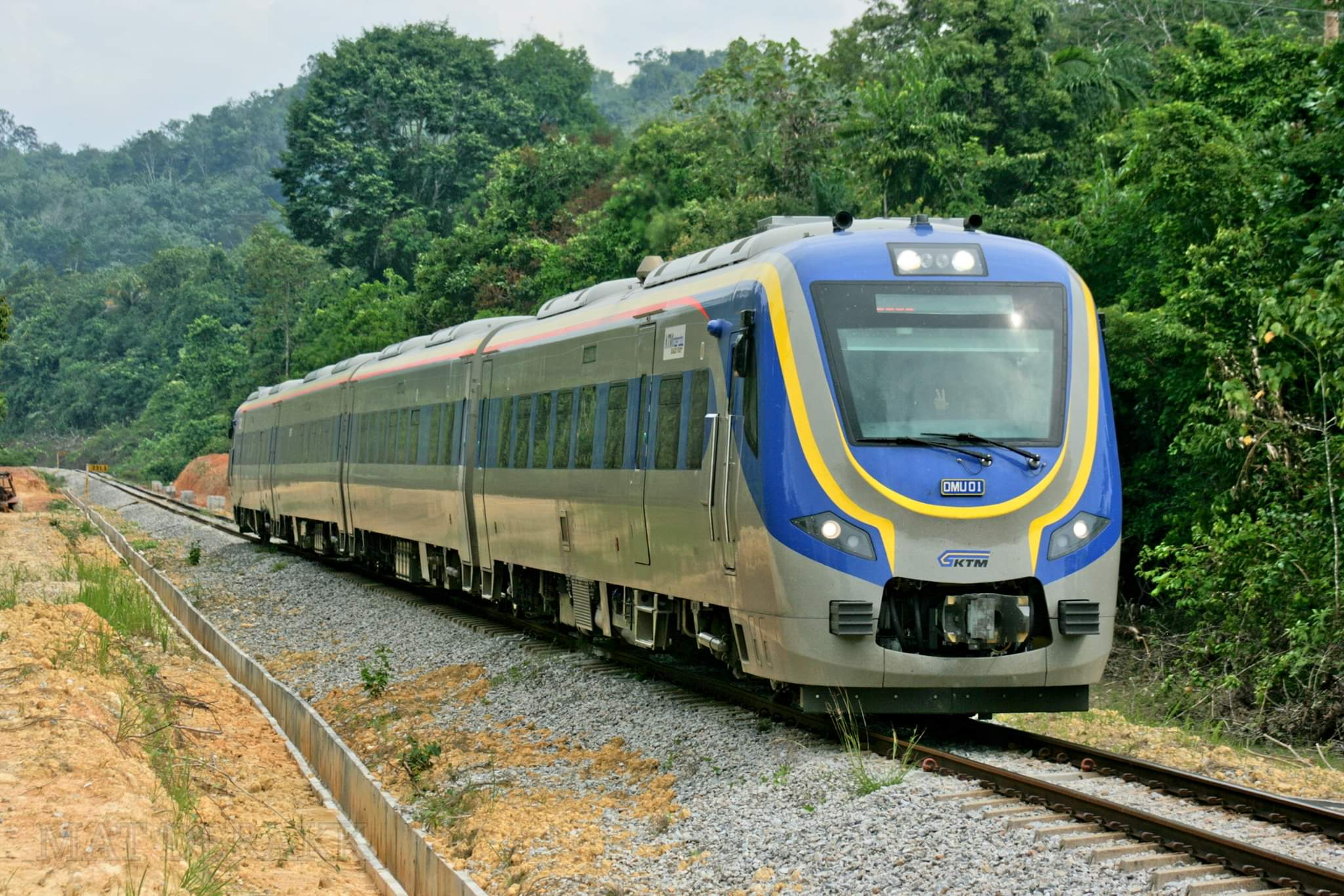
Class 61 CRRC Zhuzhou Locomotive

The Keretapi Tanah Melayu (KTM) has a total of 13 DMU KTM Class 61 ordered from CRRC for the West Coast Line is not assembled locally at CRRCs Batu Gajah factory from 2016 to 2020. The service began 1 September along the Gemas-Kuala Lipis-Tumpat route, replacing old non-automotive stock.

The Sabah State Railway (JKNS) utilized HD-100A DMU sets from CRRC Ziyang, along with older 2-car DMU sets for the West Sabah Line.

==== Philippines ====
The Philippine National Railways (PNR) was one of the first adopters of diesel multiple unit trains in Asia. Initially built as gasoline-powered railmotors, the locally assembled Manila Railroad RMC class of 1929 was the first to be powered by diesel traction. Some units were also converted to streamliner units by 1932 for first-class services on the South Main Line between Manila and Legazpi, Albay. Since then, generations of DMUs were used chiefly for short-distance commuter services by the PNR in the island of Luzon.

Even without active inter-city rail services in the present day, DMUs are still used on the PNR Metro Commuter Line in Metro Manila and the Bicol Commuter service in the Bicol Region. Three generations of DMUs are in use: second-hand DMUs handed over by JR East such as the KiHa 35, 52 and 59 series originally built in the 1960s and acquired in the early 2010s, the Rotem DMUs of 2009 built by Korean manufacturer Hyundai Rotem, and the 8000 and 8100 classes built by Indonesian firm PT INKA.

From 2022 onwards, the PNR will purchase standard gauge DMUs for its upcoming inter-city rail network in Luzon and Mindanao. This is compared to the 3 ft 6 in gauge of the rolling stock that is currently in active service. This move should allow access to better technology and increase line speeds.

==== South Korea ====
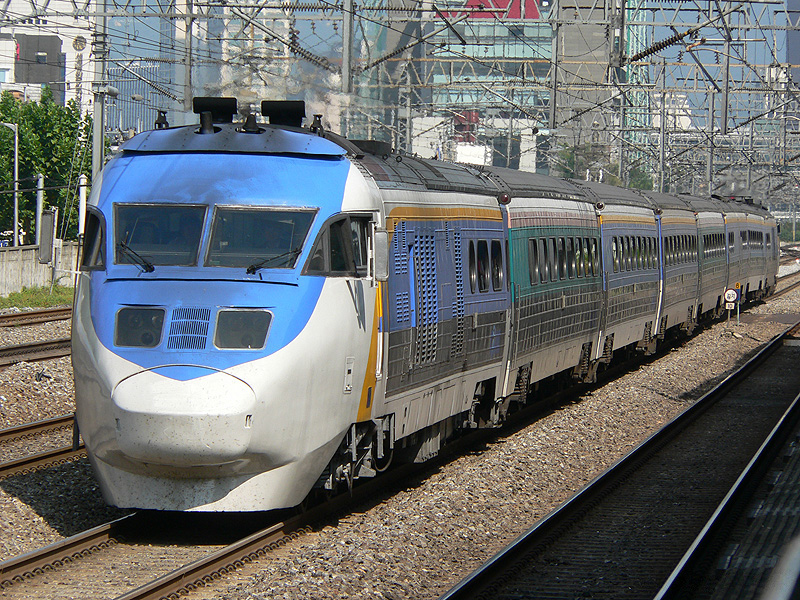
Now retired Korail DHC-PP with new CI colour

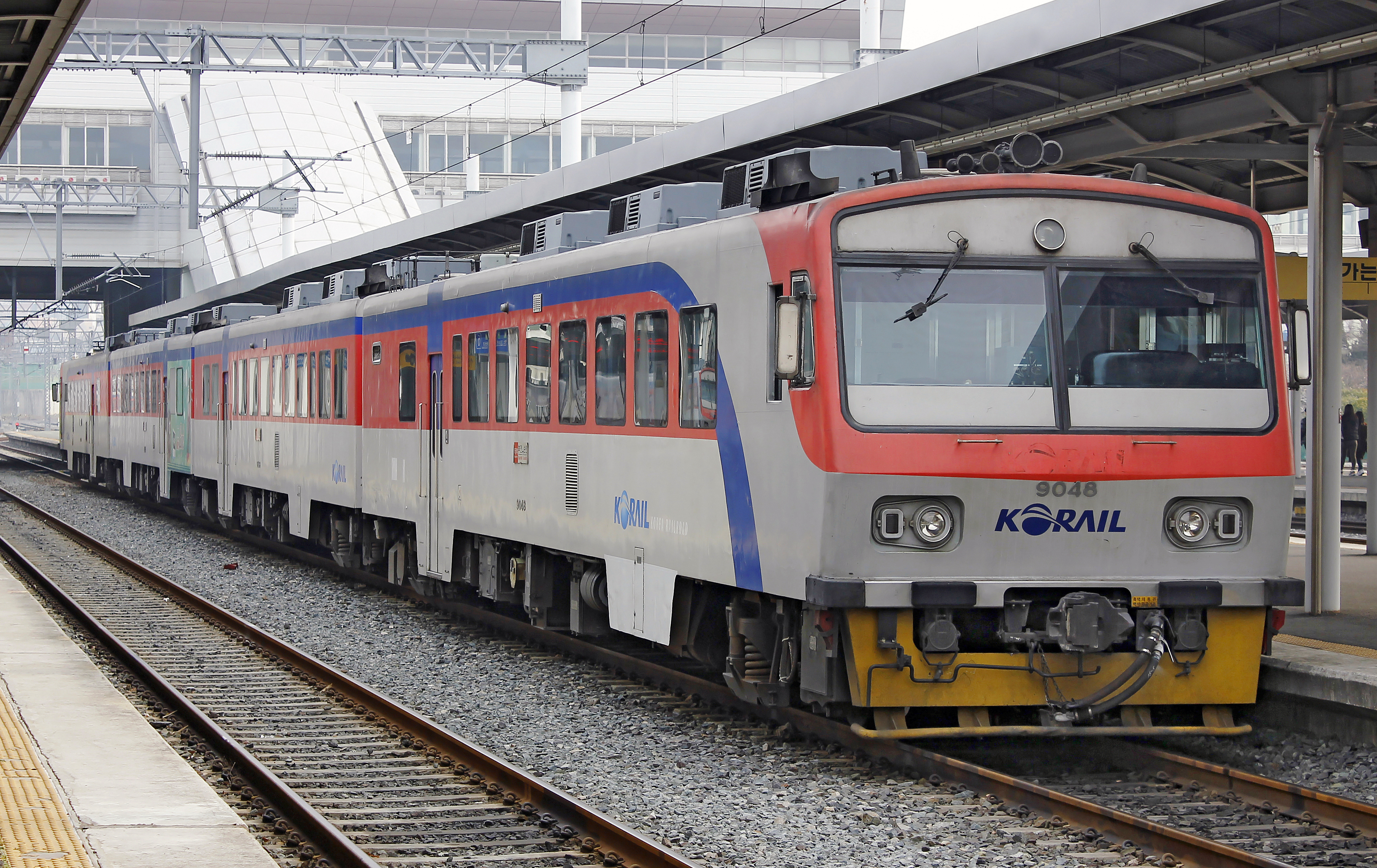
Korail RDC DMU at Bujeon Station. Not a Budd Rail Diesel Car (RDC).

Korail used to operates many DMUs. The Diesel Hydraulic Car (DHC), which made its debut for the 1988 Seoul Olympics, was able to reach speeds up to 150 km/h (93 mph) and operated Saemaul-ho services. These trains were retired in 2008.

==== Sri Lanka ====
DMUs were first introduced to Sri Lanka Railways in 1940. The aim of this was to connect minor railway stations and secondary stops on the main line not served by express trains.

==== Taiwan ====
DMUs are now usually used on the Taiwan Railway Administration Hualien–Taitung Line, North-Link Line, South-Link Line. DMUs in Taiwan are classified as Class DR:

- Class DR2700 – built by Tokyu Car Corporation in 1966; was the fastest train on the West Coast line
- Class DR2800 – built by Tokyu Car Corporation in 1982 and 1984
- Class DR2900
- Class DR3000
- Class DR3100.

==== Thailand ====
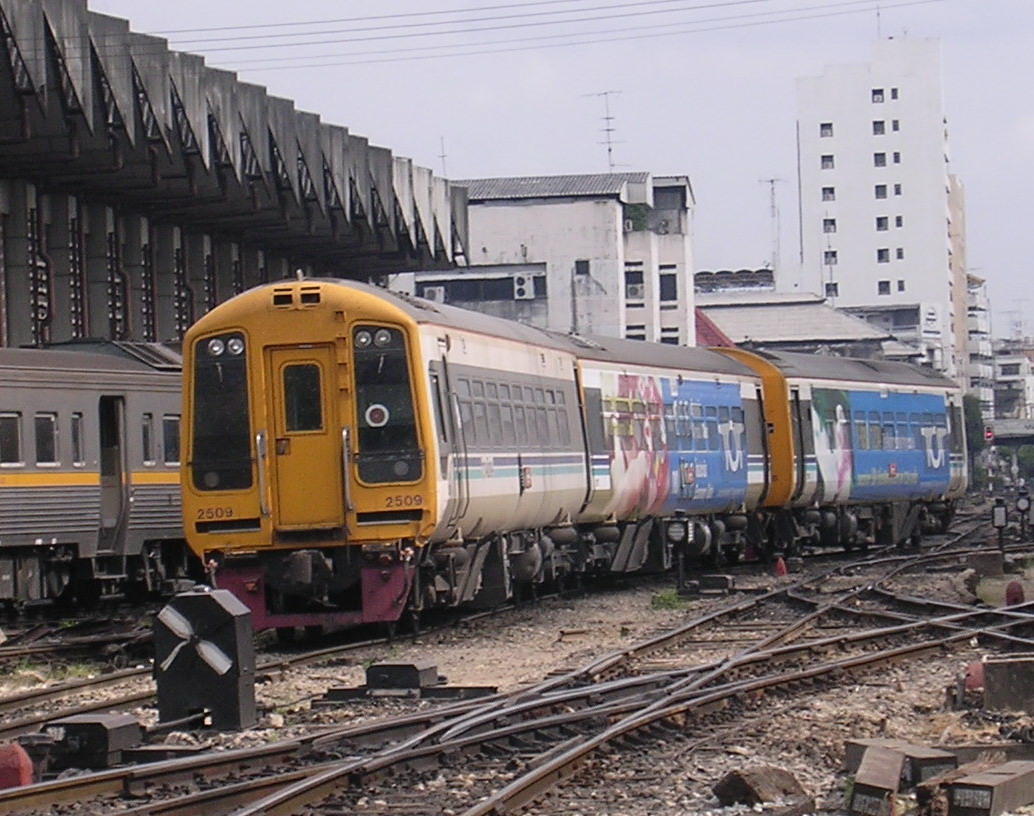
ASR (Sprinter) Class diesel train at Bangkok (Krungthep Station), Thailand

The State Railway of Thailand ASR class is a DMU operated by the State Railway of Thailand. Built by British Rail Engineering Limited at Derby Litchurch Lane Works in England, it is based on the Class 158. Twenty carriages were built in 1990/91. All were painted in the same Regional Railways livery as the Class 158s:

- Numbers 2501 – 2512 (with cockpit) 12 Unit
- Numbers 2113 – 2120 (no cockpit) 8 Unit.

== Manufacturers ==
DMU manufacturers include:

- Alstom, France
- AnsaldoBreda, Italy
- BEML, India
- BHEL, India
- Bombardier Transportation of Montreal, Canada
- British Rail Engineering Limited, Great Britain (1962–1980s)
- British Railways, Great Britain (1950s–1962)
- Budd Company of United States
- CAF
- Colorado Railcar, US (Rader Railcar 1988–1997, Colorado Railcar 1997–2008, US Railcar 2009–present)
- CRRC, China
- DMZ, Russia
- EIKON International
- Electroputere VFU, Romania
- Ferrovias Del Bajio S.A. de C.V., Mexico
- Ganz-MÁVAG, Hungary
- Hyundai Rotem of Seoul, South Korea
- INKA, Indonesia
- Integral Coach Factory, Chennai, India
- Luganskteplovoz, Ukraine
- Materfer, Argentina
- Metrovagonmash, Russia
- Niigata Transys of Tokyo, Japan
- Nippon Sharyo/Sumitomo, Japan
- Pojazdy Szynowe Pesa Bydgoszcz
- RVR, Latvia
- Siemens Mobility, Germany
- Stadler Rail of Bussnang, Switzerland
- Torzhoksky car-building factory, Russia
- TÜVASAŞ of Adapazarı, Turkey.

== See also ==
- Electric multiple unit
- Battery electric multiple unit
- Diesel locomotive
