= KiHa 43000 =

Japanese train type

KiHa 43000 series
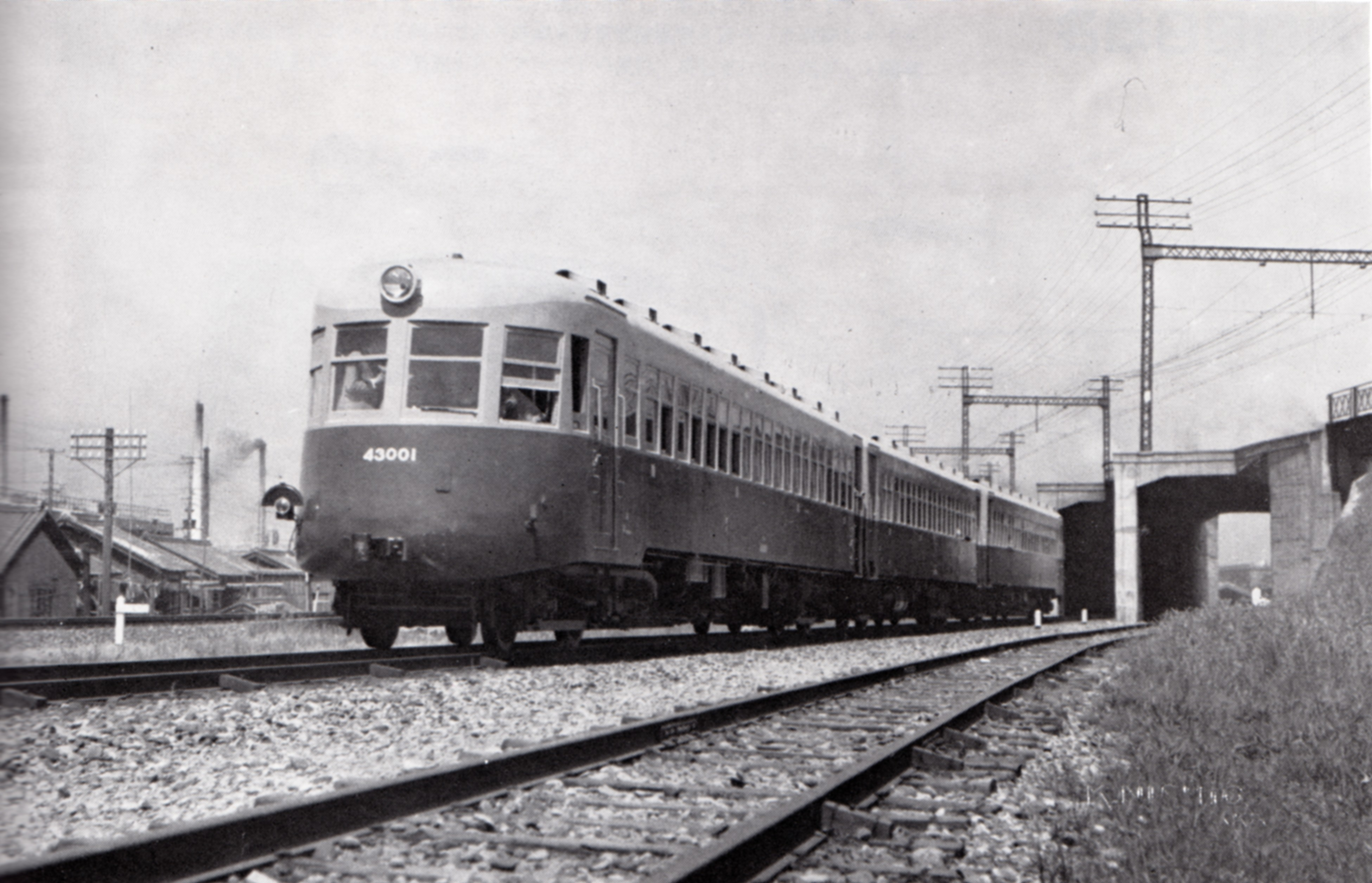
- JGR KiHa 43000 between Takatori and Hyogo, circa 1937
- In service: 1937–1958?
- Built at: Kawasaki Sharyo
- Constructed: 1935?–1942?
- Operators: JGR (1937-1949); JNR (1949-1958?)

Specifications
- Traction motors: 2 x 80 kW (107 hp) DC motors
- Power output: 1 x 240 hp (179 kW) diesel prime mover 1 x 150 kW (201 hp) generator
- Transmission: Diesel-electric
- Track gauge: 1,067 mm (3 ft 6 in)

The KiHa 43000 was a train and one of the first two streamlined diesel multiple units in Japan, the other being the Kihani 5000. Its development was inspired by the "Fliegender Hamburger" in Germany.
