= Sino-Singapore Tianjin Eco-City =

Coordinates: 39°09′11″N 117°47′01″E

Sino-Singapore Tianjin Eco-City 中新天津生态城
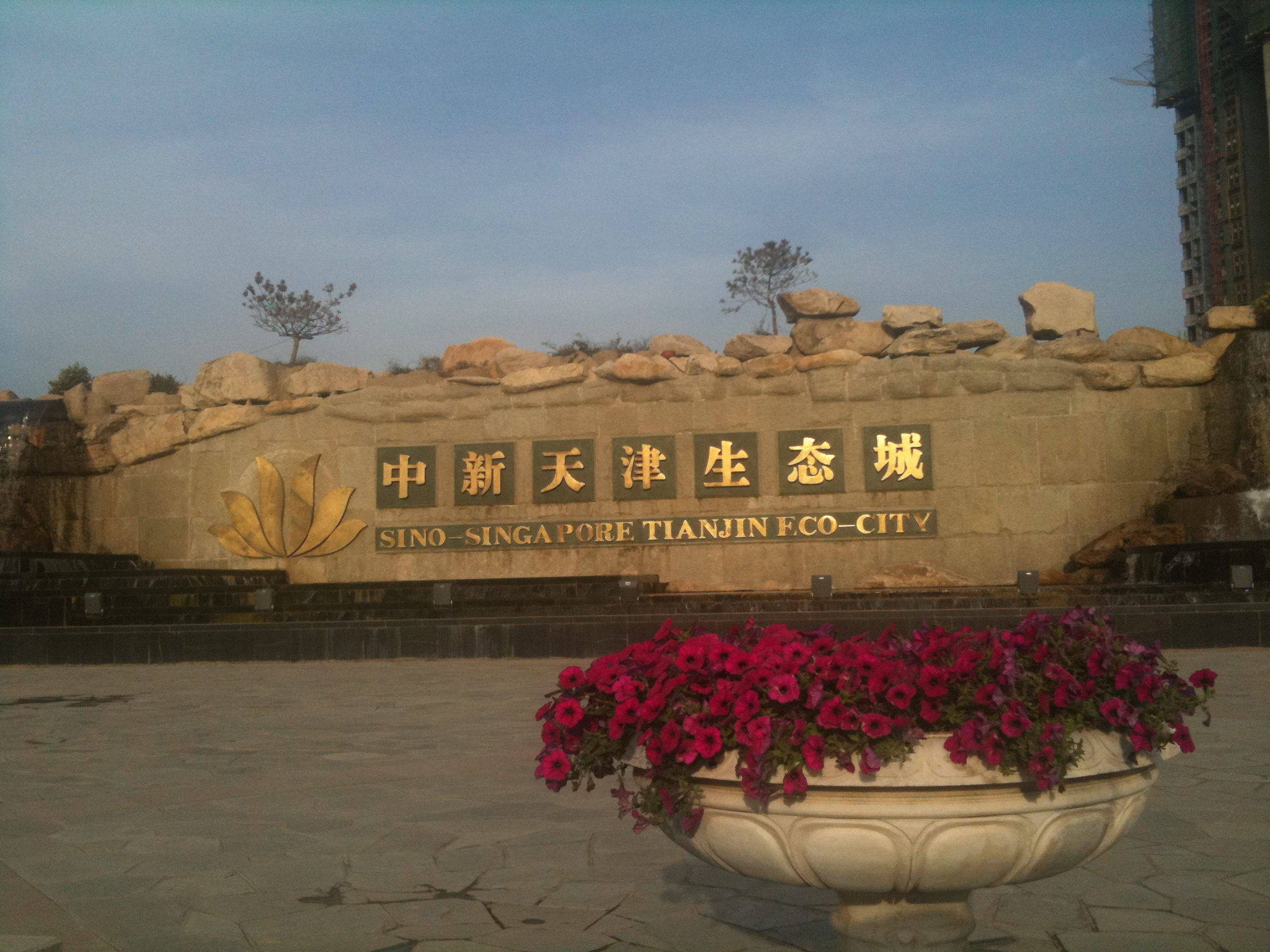
- Entrance sign

- Logo
- Interactive map of Sino-Singapore Tianjin Eco-City
- Country: China
- Direct-controlled municipality: Tianjin
- District: Binhai

Area
  - Total: 30 km^{2} (12 sq mi)

Population (2019)
  - Total: 100,000
- Time zone: UTC+8 (China Standard Time)
- Website: www.tianjinecocity.gov.sg www.eco-city.gov.cn

The Sino-Singapore Tianjin Eco-City (SSTEC, simplified Chinese: 中新天津生态城; traditional Chinese: 中新天津生態城; pinyin: Zhōng-Xīn Tiānjīn Shēngtài Chéng) is a planned city jointly developed by the governments of China and Singapore. Located in Binhai, the Eco-City was intentionally sited on "non-arable" land with a "water shortage" to the southeast of Tianjin's urban core, in order to prove that sustainable urban development could be realised even under challenging environmental conditions. Spanning 30 square kilometres (12 mi^{2}), the project embodies Singapore's longstanding expertise in urban planning, environmental management and efficient governance.

As of April 2019, the Eco-City was home to about 100,000 residents, though the original plan targeted a population of 350,000 by 2020. While growth has been slower than anticipated, the city remains an ambitious long-term undertaking with its developers continuing to target the original population milestone. Singapore's involvement has ensured that the city is guided by high planning standards, measurable sustainability benchmarks and a people-centric approach, although its full implementation by local Chinese officials remains to be seen.

== History ==
=== Background ===
On 25 April 2007, then Senior Minister of Singapore, Goh Chok Tong, met with former Chinese Premier Wen Jiabao to discuss a collaborative vision for a planned city that could help address the challenges of China's rapid urbanisation and its evolving commitment to sustainable development. Four candidate sites were considered for the project, and the Tianjin site was selected.

On 18 November 2007, when Singaporean Prime Minister Lee Hsien Loong and Wen Jiabao signed a Framework Agreement to develop the Sino-Singapore Tianjin Eco-City. The agreement outlined a shared objective to create a city that was practical, replicable and scalable, with a focus on environmental sustainability, particularly in energy efficiency and resource conservation. Singapore’s role in the project extended beyond technical expertise to strategic policy coordination, as seen in the formation of a dedicated Ministerial Committee in 2011, aimed at enhancing inter-agency support – an indication of the project's national significance.

=== Aims ===
In 2008, the governments of Singapore and China laid out 26 key performance indicators (KPIs) to measure the city's future ecological, economic, and social development. These initial 26 KPIs comprised 22 quantitative measures and 4 qualitative measures, and included guidelines for air quality, water quality, noise pollution, wetland and shoreline protection, urban greenspace, water consumption, modes of transportation, waste generation, local employment opportunities, and other areas. In 2018, the city's KPIs were updated and reformulated to span 30 quantitative measures and 6 qualitative measures. These revised KPIs lay out targets set for 2023, 2028, and 2035.

=== Construction and opening ===
A joint venture, the Sino-Singapore Tianjin Eco-City Investment and Development Co., Ltd. was established to oversee development. The Sino-Singapore Tianjin Eco-City Administrative committee was created as the governing body for the Eco-City.

The groundbreaking ceremony for the Sino-Singapore Tianjin Eco-City took place on 28 September 2008, officiated by Singapore's Senior Minister Goh Chok Tong and Chinese Premier Wen Jiabao, signalling the start of the city’s construction. The project was driven by a collaborative model involving public and private actors from both countries, with oversight provided by a Joint Steering Council, a Joint Working Committee, and the Sino-Singapore Tianjin Eco-City Investment and Development Co., Ltd. Construction began with an 8 square kilometres (3.1 mi^{2}) start-up area which included community centres, an administrative complex, residential zones and industrial developments. The opening of the National Animation Industrial Park in May 2011 marked one of the city's first economic milestones, while the arrival of its first 60 families in March 2012 and the opening of its first community centre in November 2013.

Infrastructure and public amenities continued to expand steadily in the following years. On 26 April 2016, work commenced on Line Z4, a planned metro link to integrate the Eco-City into the wider Tianjin transport network. This was followed by the opening of a water reclamation plant on 25 June 2017, and the official launch of the city centre on 1 July 2018. Despite the city's advanced water treatment capabilities, only Eco-City residents currently benefit from this quality of supply, with surrounding areas expected to catch up in time. The development of the city's Central District began in 2019, designed to span 4.5 square kilometres (1.7 mi^{2}) and house approximately 58,000 residents. As of 2023, the start-up area was completed, with a new focus on the creation of a mixed-use, human-centred environment through features such as the “Green Smart Hub” and Friendship Garden. Aesthetic and ecological considerations have also been balanced, with both native flora and exotic plants integrated throughout the area, even including artificial foliage in winter months. In October 2024, the Eco-City became home to the newly established China Resources Recycling Group.

== Economy ==
The Eco-City is in Binhai New District, which is economically prominent in Tianjin and the Bohai Sea Rim region more generally. Binhai's GDP grew by 20.6% annually from 1994 to 2005.

=== Development ===
During the period spanning from 2014 to September 2018, the Sino-Singapore Tianjin Eco-City experienced a remarkable surge in the number of registered companies. According to Singapore, the count soared from 2,200 to an impressive total of approximately 7,000 entities. The cumulative registered capital of these enterprises amounted to a staggering RMB 270 billion, indicative of the thriving business environment within the Eco-City.

The Sino-Singapore Tianjin Eco-City has emerged as an economic hub, fueled by its commitment to sustainable development and strategic partnerships. In 2018, the city government announced the city's collaboration with Huawei, a leading global information and communication solutions provider, has played a role in shaping its economic landscape. Huawei's implementation of the "Two Clouds" initiative, comprising the Software Development Cloud and Urban Industry Cloud, has been vital in driving the economic growth of the Eco-City. The Urban Industry Cloud, utilizing cloud computing and big data infrastructure, has provided support to local governments in fostering an environment conducive to the development of urban industries. This has facilitated the digital transformation and restructuring of emerging digital sectors, serving as a robust foundation for the Eco-City's intelligentization efforts. Additionally, the Software Development Cloud has brought about a shift in enterprise operations through its comprehensive cloud-based DevOps platform. This platform has enabled software development, collaboration in research and development, and talent cultivation, thereby enhancing the competitiveness of local businesses and high-end software professionals.

In the pursuit of integrating industry and city, the Eco-City not only focuses on constructing a smart city but also actively introduces intelligent enterprises, establishes intelligent industry training bases, cultivates intelligent industry talents, creates intelligent application scenarios, and develops independently researched and developed intelligent products. This has resulted in the formation of an integrated intelligent industry chain that encompasses production, education, research, and application. The signing ceremony for the Eco-City-Huawei Intelligent Industry Chain project witnessed the settlement of 27 intelligent enterprises, represented by Huawei Marine Networks Co., Ltd. and Sercoh (Tianjin) Automotive Intelligent Technology Co., Ltd.

=== Future Goals ===
Sino-Singapore Tianjin Eco-City has a set of economics KPIs to be achieved:

By 2023, the Sino-Singapore Tianjin Eco-City has set several goals to be achieved:

- Ensure that all residents in the Eco-City are covered by the comprehensive social security package provided by the Chinese Government, promoting social welfare and security.
- Establish a robust research and development (R&D) ecosystem with a minimum of 150 R&D scientists and engineers per 10,000 employed persons, fostering innovation and technological advancements.

Looking ahead to 2035, the Eco-City has ambitious targets to further its sustainable development:

- Increase the proportion of affordable public housing to at least 20%, addressing the housing needs of the community.
- Improve waste management practices with a goal of achieving a recycling rate of at least 70%, promoting a circular economy and minimizing environmental impact.
- Drive digital transformation by achieving 100% city management digitalization, enabling real-time monitoring and publication of municipal data for efficient urban governance.
- Limit carbon emissions to 100 tons per US$1 million of GDP, contributing to a low-carbon and environmentally friendly economy.
- Foster a culture of innovation by encouraging at least 75% of companies to actively participate in innovation activities, driving economic growth and competitiveness.
- Create a balanced employment-housing relationship by employing at least 50% of the local employable residents within the Eco-City, supporting the local workforce and enhancing community integration.

These goals exemplify the Eco-City's commitment to sustainable urban development, innovation, and resource efficiency. Through these measures, the Eco-City aims to become a model for future eco-friendly cities, contributing to a greener and more sustainable future.

== Geography ==
The Sino-Singapore Tianjin Eco-city is located in Binhai, along the Bohai Bay. The city is approximately 10 kilometres (6.2 mi) from Binhai's core, 40 kilometres (25 mi) southeast of Tianjin's core, and 150 kilometres (93 mi) southeast of Beijing's core. The southern tip of the eco-city site only a 10-minute drive from the Tianjin Economic-Technological Development Area (TEDA).

Prior to the development of the city, the area of the project largely comprised saltpans, barren land, and polluted bodies of water. It previously constituted a center for salt mining, a site for carbon sink at wetlands, and a century-old cultural landscape praised by the Chinese poet Fan Bin.

The city also aims to respect existing structures in the area. The profile of the Ji Canal, which is 1,000 years old, will be retained. Two existing villages within the Eco-city site will also be conserved through adaptive reuse or partial rebuilding.

== Population ==
Early in its construction, the city failed to attract many residents. The city's first residents moved in during March 2012. An April 2014 piece by The Guardian put the city's population at around 6,000, and noted that many of the city's buildings were unoccupied. However, the city reported a substantially higher population of 20,000 in 2014. The Guardian reported that the area offered relatively inexpensive apartments and school tuition vis-à-vis other areas in Tianjin, and that developers hoped that this would attract more residents. In subsequent years, the city's population grew rapidly, and the city reported a population of over 80,000 in 2018.

In April 2019, China Daily reported that the city's population was approximately 100,000. However, this is well short of the project's initial goal of housing 350,000 people by 2020.

A public housing complex based on Singapore's public housing policies, including a "'home ownership' scheme," is aimed at meeting the housing needs of lower and lower-middle income groups in society.

== Layout ==
The Sino-Singapore Tianjin Eco-city describes its layout as "1 Axis, 3 Centres, 4 Districts". The "1 Axis" references an "Eco-valley" that cuts through the city, for the purpose of "providing a scenic trail for pedestrians and cyclists". The "3 Centres" refers to the three planned centres of the city: one along the southern banks of the Ji Canal, one to the city's north, and a third in the city's south. Finally, the "4 Districts" refer to the four residential districts in the city's southern, central, northern, and northeastern portions. Each district is made up different neighborhoods with individual commercial centres and public amenities. The city's four districts are further divided into several "Eco-neighborhoods", which each comprise four "Eco-cells", which are basic 400 metres (440 yd) by 400 metres (440 yd) blocks. The "Eco-cells" are intended to incentivize walking by minimizing the travel distance, and thereby reducing time poverty. Views of the waterfront are retained by a reduction in building heights.

=== Parks ===
The China-Singapore Friendship Garden serves as the city's main park, spanning an area of 41 hectares (0.16 mi^{2}) along the Ji Canal.

== Environmental Goals ==
=== Natural Environment ===
By 2023, the PM2.5 concentration should not exceed 50 μg/m^{3}, and a 20% improvement rate in ambient air quality. SSTEC also aimed for 100% ecological shoreline retention by the same year. By 2028, SSTEC aimed to satisfy grade II of China's National Ambient Air Quality Grade air quality grade for 85% of the year, and all water body satisfy grade IV of Chinese national standard, as well as 100% wetland protection. SSTEC also aimed for more than 70% of its plant varieties in the to be native vegetation.

=== Resources ===
The "1 Axis" and "Eco-cell" designs are meant to facilitate walking and cycling instead of using vehicles. Renewable energy is planned to produce at least 32% of energy for the city by 2035. Additionally, 60% of the Eco-city's water supply will be from non-traditional sources such as desalinated water and recycled water.

== Transportation ==
The city's "Eco-valley" serves as a walking and cycling pathway that cuts through the city.

To encourage drivers to use electric vehicles, charging stations have been placed across the city.

A light-rail transit system, supplemented by a secondary network of trams and buses, will be the main mode of transportation in the Eco-city, which developers hope will help to reduce its carbon emissions. A station named Zhongxinshengtaicheng opened on Line Z4 Phase 1, part of the Tianjin Metro. Phase 2 will the city with Binhai Station, and from there to Beijing by the Beijing-Tianjin HSR.

== See also ==
- Binhai
- Suzhou Industrial Park
- Urban Planning Society of China
- Yujiabao Financial District
- Eco-cities in China
