= Junliangcheng North railway station =

Railway station in Tianjin, China

Coordinates: 39°03′58″N 117°25′39″E

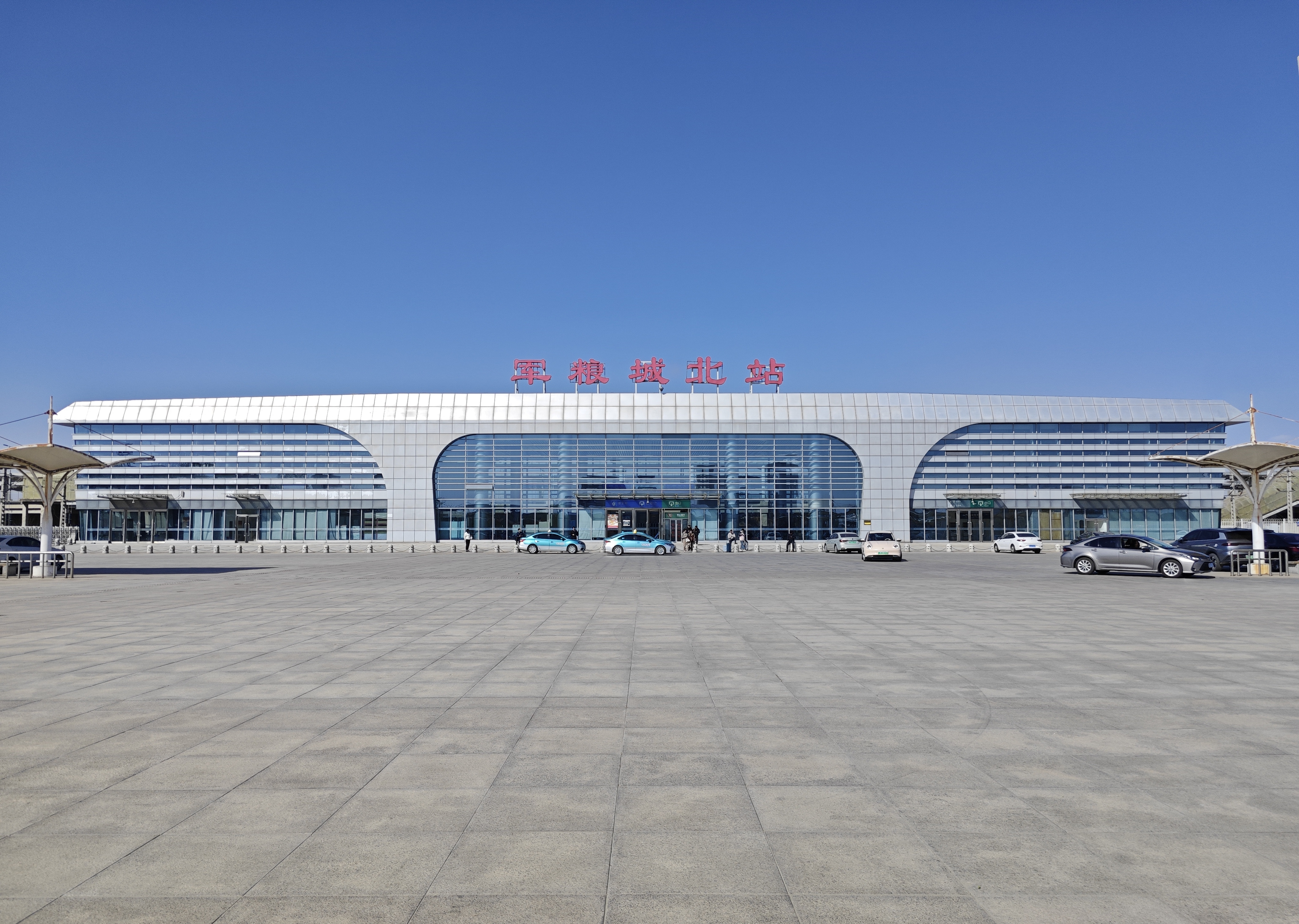
Station building

Junliangcheng North station (simplified Chinese: 军粮城北站; traditional Chinese: 軍糧城北站; pinyin: Jūnliángchéngběi Zhàn) is a railway station of the Tianjin–Qinhuangdao high-speed railway in Dongli District, Tianjin. The station has been in operation since December 1, 2013.

Preceding station	China Railway High-speed	Following station
Tianjin towards Beijing South	Beijing–Tianjin intercity railway	Tanggu towards Binhai
Tianjin towards Tianjin West	Tianjin–Qinhuangdao high-speed railway	Tangshan towards Qinhuangdao
