= Wuqing railway station =

Railway station in Tianjin, China

Wuqing 武清
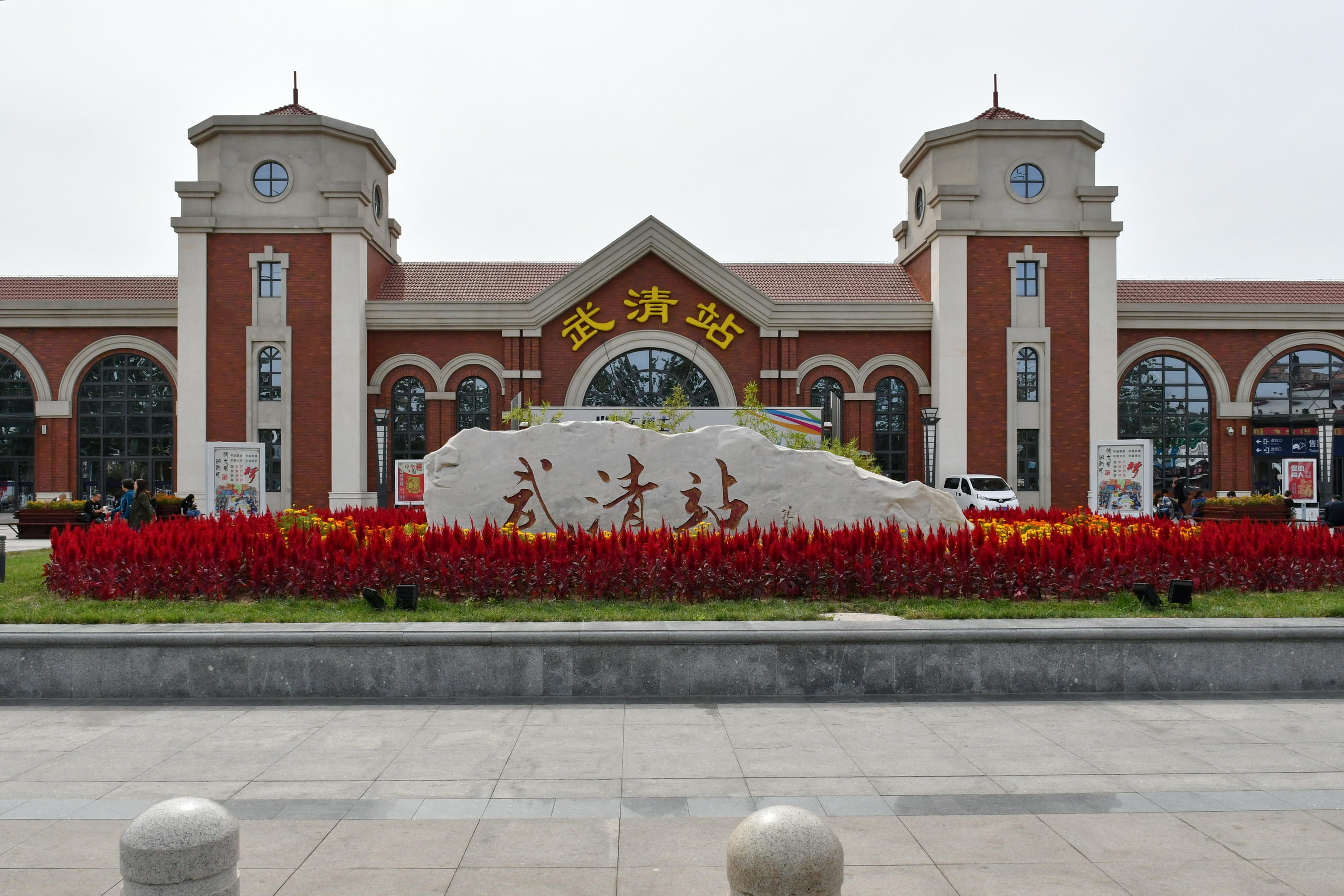
- Platform 2 at Wuqing

General information
- Location: Wuqing, Tianjin; China
- Coordinates: 38.306313°N 116.761247°E
- Operated by: Beijing Railway Bureau; China Railway Corporation
- Line: Beijing–Tianjin intercity railway
- Platforms: 2

History
- Opened: August 1, 2008

Services
Preceding station	China Railway High-speed	Following station
Yizhuang towards Beijing South	Beijing–Tianjin intercity railway	Tianjin towards Binhai
Location

Wuqing railway station is a high-speed railway station on the Beijing–Tianjin intercity railway in Wuqing, Tianjin, China that was opened in 2008. It is the only midway stop presently open to intercity railway traffic. The only trains calling at Wuqing are those with train numbers between C2201 and C2268.

Platform 1 is for trains heading to Tianjin, while Platform 2 serves trains to Beijing South. Two tracks run through the centre of the station and are reserved for trains on direct services not calling at this station.

The station building is to the north of the platforms and features a combined ticketing and waiting hall.

== See also ==
Wuqing railway station is 5 km away from Yangcun railway station on Beijing–Shanghai railway.
