= Yujiapu Financial District =

Central business district in Binhai, Tianjin, China

Yujiapu Financial District 于家堡金融区
- Central business district
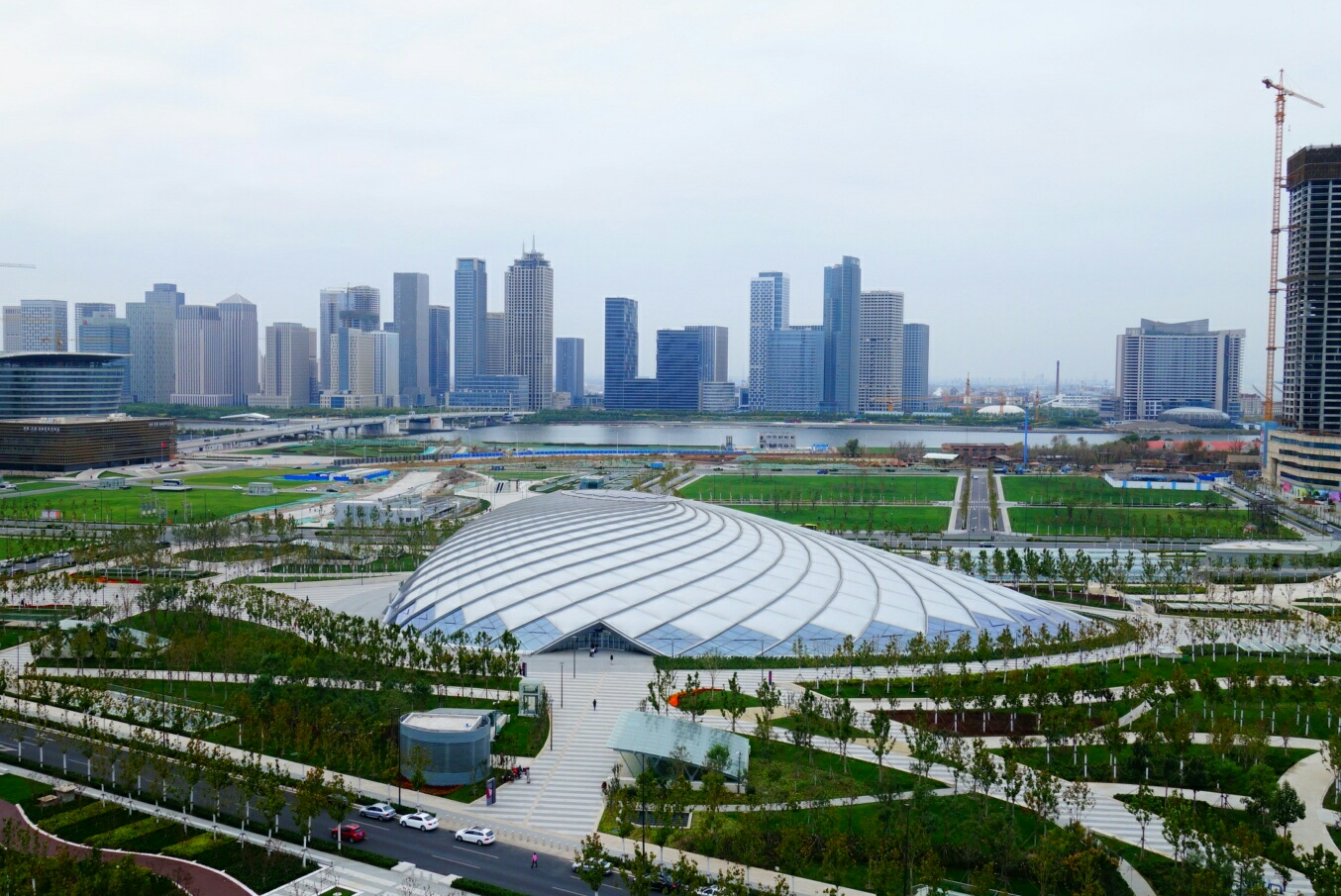
- Binhai railway station and the Yujiapu skyline
- Interactive map of Yujiapu Financial District
- Coordinates: 38°59′49″N 117°41′03″E
- Country: China
- Municipality: Tianjin
- District: Binhai New Area

Area
  - Total: 3.86 km^{2} (1.49 sq mi)

Yujiapu Financial District (Chinese: 于家堡金融区; pinyin: Yújiāpù Jīnróng Qū), commonly called Yujiapu, is a central business district in the Binhai New Area of Tianjin, China. It occupies a 3.86-square-kilometre (1.49 sq mi) peninsula formed by a meander of the Hai River, opposite the Xiangluowan Business District.

Planned from 2008 as a financial center for northern China, Yujiapu was promoted as a rival to Shanghai's Lujiazui and was widely described in foreign media as a replica of Manhattan. Its first phase was largely completed by 2015, but the project was slowed by debt and weak demand, and the half-empty district became a frequently cited example of a Chinese "ghost city". Since 2018 the area has been repositioned as a mixed-use district with a larger residential component, and local authorities have sought to fill vacant office buildings and idle land.

== History ==
=== Early history ===
Yujiapu began as a fishing village. According to local tradition, it was founded during the Yongle era of the Ming dynasty by the brothers Yu Ying and Yu Chao, migrants from Wendeng in Shandong, and it later developed into a busy river port.

=== Planning and construction (2008–2015) ===
In 2008 Yujiapu was designated as the financial center of the Binhai New Area, and the village was cleared for redevelopment. The district was developed by Tianjin New Finance Investment Co., Ltd., which presented it as the northern counterpart to Lujiazui, the financial district that had driven the growth of Pudong in the 1990s. Construction of the first phase, which included the high-speed railway station and a group of office towers, began in 2010. The Baolong Plaza shopping center opened at the end of 2014, and the first phase was essentially complete in 2015, when the underground Yujiapu railway station entered service. The district had been expected to open for business in June 2014.

By 2014 foreign journalists reported that construction had largely halted, with several completed towers standing empty and fenced off. Reports in 2015 described developers leaving unfinished projects as the heavily indebted scheme, often valued at about US$50 billion, struggled for funding. Residents also reported that the low-lying site, built on reclaimed coastal salt flats, was prone to street flooding during storms. Journalists Henry Sanderson and Michael Forsythe cited Yujiapu as an example of ambition turning into "hubris" in Tianjin's development.

Occupancy began to improve from around 2016, when property buyers started moving into the district. Local commentators have attributed the district's underperformance to the global financial crisis, the wider economic slowdown, competition from neighboring areas, a narrow industrial base and a lack of supporting amenities.

=== Repositioning since 2018 ===
In 2018 Yujiapu revised its planning strategy, converting roughly 90 percent of the land originally zoned for commercial and service use to residential use. The aim was to turn the single-purpose financial district into an area that combined housing with industry. China's 14th Five-Year Plan period brought a further goal of reviving vacant buildings and idle land in Yujiapu and Xiangluowan to form the core of the Binhai urban area.

In 2019 the high-speed railway station was renamed Binhai railway station, and several departments of the Tianjin Economic-Technological Development Area administrative committee moved into the Baoxin Building in Yujiapu.

Yujiapu and Xiangluowan have since been planned together as the "Yu–Xiang" area, covering about 6.1 square kilometres (2.4 sq mi). The area is intended to host technology and innovation businesses, modern finance, new-economy companies, trade and shipping services. Targets set for 2025 included average annual GDP growth of at least 20 percent and employment of more than 100,000 people. At an investment promotion event, 21 companies and institutions, including Baidu AI Cloud, agreed to locate in the area, with a combined investment of 12 billion yuan.

By 2025 the district's first schools, a primary school and a campus of Tianjin Yaohua Middle School, had opened, alongside international hotels and a riverside park. Problems remained, however. In 2025 district officials were working to revive the underground shopping street, the Liqin Financial Plaza was put up for auction, and many office buildings remained difficult to let.

== Geography ==
Yujiapu lies on a peninsula in the core of the Binhai New Area and is bounded by the Hai River on its east, west and south sides. Because the river's meander gives it a rounded shape, the peninsula is locally likened to a purse. The Xiangluowan Business District lies across the river to the west. The district is roughly 40 kilometres (25 mi) from central Tianjin and a short drive from the Tianjin Economic-Technological Development Area.

== Transport ==
Binhai railway station (formerly Yujiapu railway station), located underground in the district, is the southern terminus of the Beijing–Tianjin intercity railway. Because the station connects only to Tianjin and Beijing, and local rail transit has been slow to develop, the district's connections within the Beijing–Tianjin–Hebei region have been described as poor. As of 2025, the Tianjin–Weifang high-speed railway and new metro lines serving the area were under construction.

== Landmarks ==
- Binhai railway station
- Tianjin Juilliard School, the Chinese campus of the Juilliard School
- Baolong Plaza shopping center
- Yujiapu underground shopping street, a cross-shaped underground retail area of about 30,000 square metres (320,000 sq ft)
- Liqin Financial Plaza

== See also ==
- Sino-Singapore Tianjin Eco-city
- Kangbashi New Area
- Ghost city
