= Tanggu railway station =

Railway station in Tianjin, China

Coordinates: 39°01′36″N 117°38′10″E

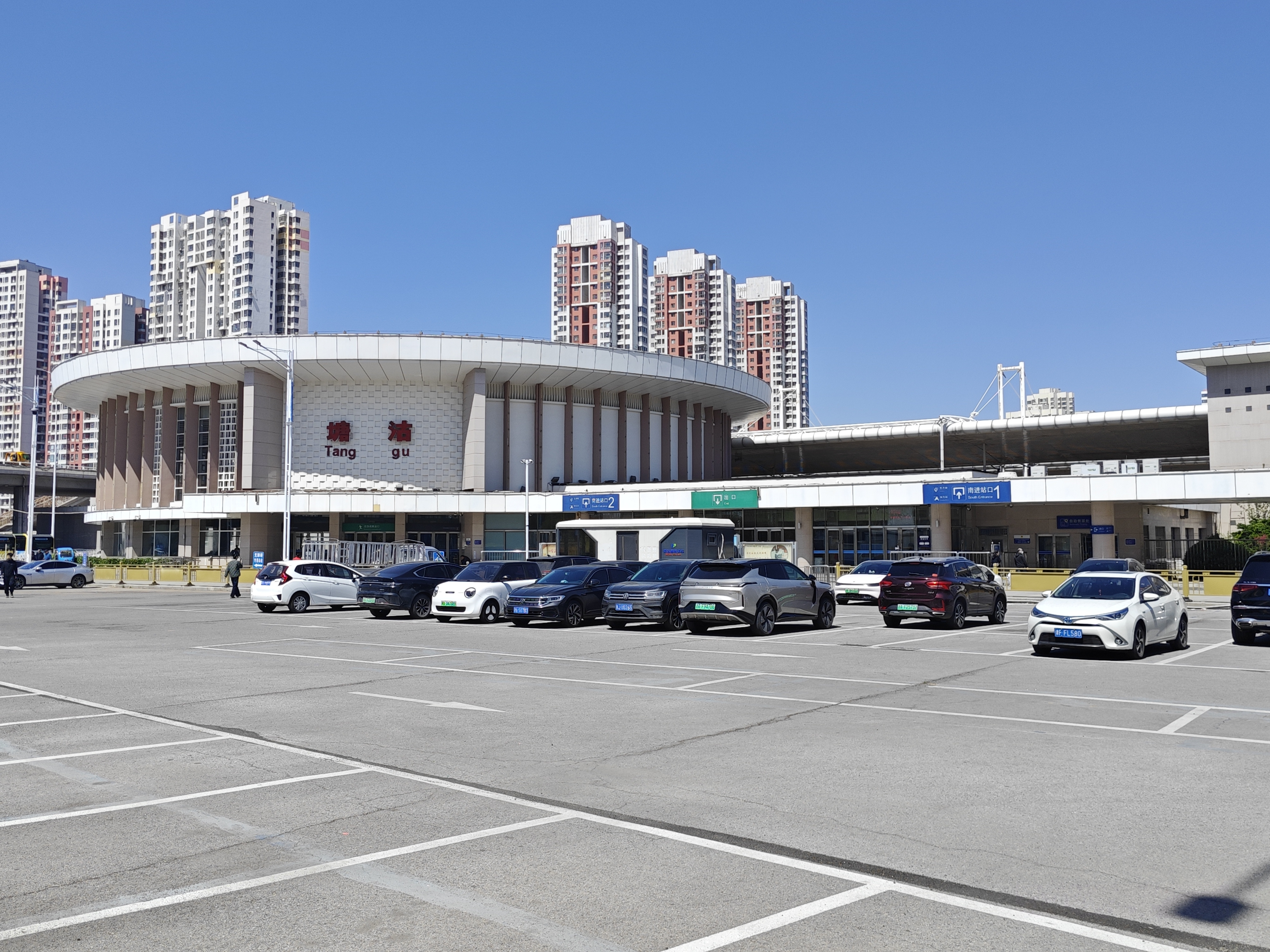
Tanggu railway station building

Tanggu railway station (Chinese: 塘沽站) is a railway station located in Binhai District, Tianjin, China. It is on the Tianjin–Shanhaiguan railway and Beijing–Tianjin intercity railway.

Preceding station	China Railway	Following station
Junliangcheng towards Tianjin	Tianjin–Shanhaiguan railway	Lutai towards Shanhaiguan
Preceding station	China Railway High-speed	Following station
Junliangcheng North towards Beijing South	Beijing–Tianjin intercity railway	Binhai Terminus
