= Ju River =

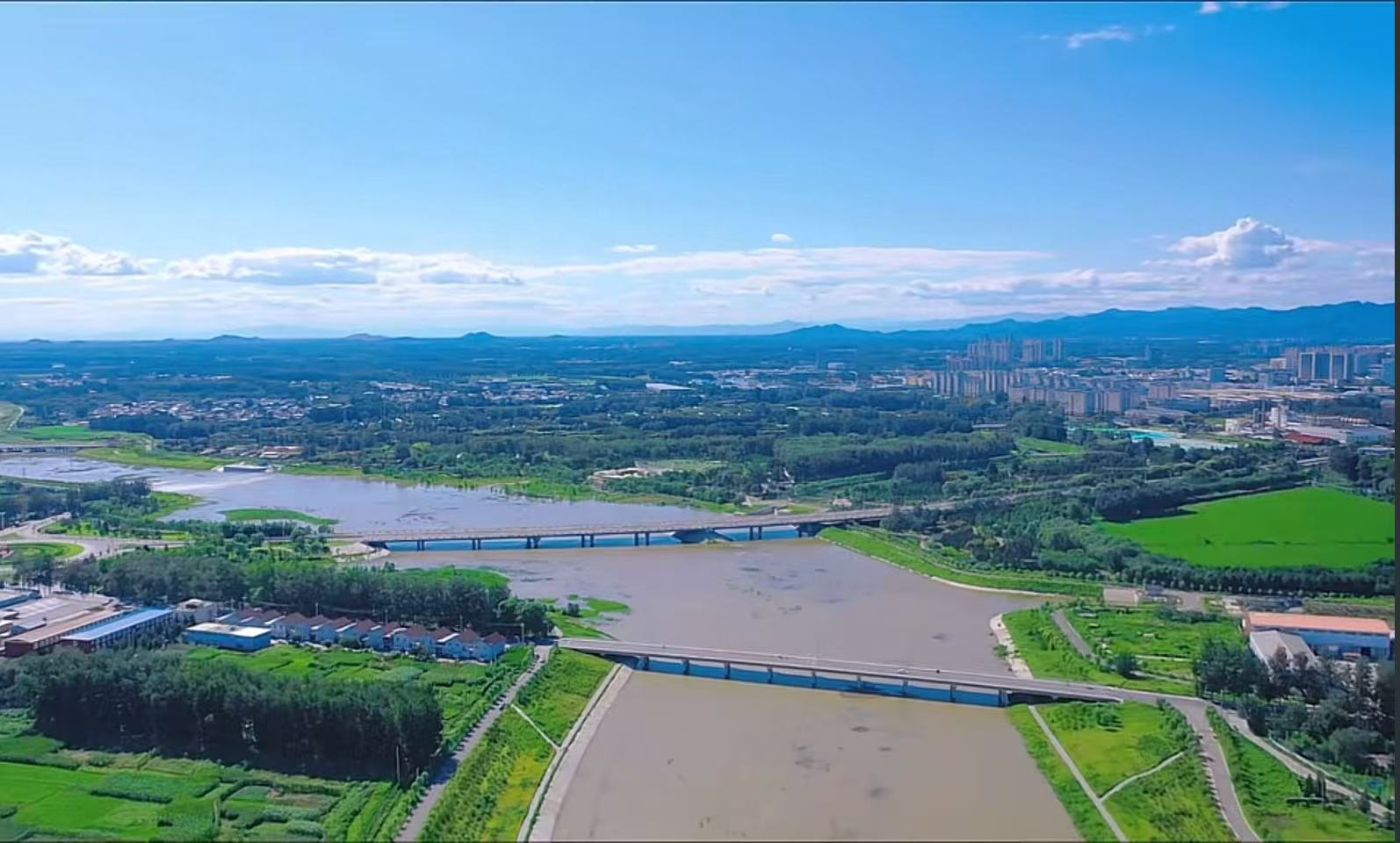
- Native name: 泃河 (Chinese)

Location
- Country: China
- Region: North China Plain
- City: Pinggu, Ji, Sanhe, Baodi

Physical characteristics
- Source: Qinghui Range near Jiangjun Pass
  - location: Xinglong County, Hebei Province, China
- Mouth: Ji Canal River
  - location: Zhangguzhuang, Tianjin, China
- Length: 128 mi (206 km)
- Basin size: 661 mi^{2} (1,710 km^{2})

Basin features
- River system: Hai River watershed

The Ju River in North China Plain is a major river in the Beijing and Tianjin vicinities. It is a part of Hai River's watershed system. In 354 BCE (Warring States period of Zhou dynasty), State of Yan defeated State of Qi in a battle by this river. In Han dynasty, the original channel of Ju River was widened by Emperor Xian so that it became a navigable river and a major military supply line to the northeast frontier. The total length of Ju River is 206 km (128 mi), 66 km (41 mi) of it in the Pinggu District of Beijing. Before paved roads were constructed in the 1930s, this river was the only transportation route to and from the remote Pinggu region. The river was polluted by industrial wastewater in the 1990s. The water quality has been improved in recent years and it has become a water resource for the Pinggu region.
