= Line B1 (Tianjin Metro) =

Future metro line in Tianjin, China

Overview
- Other name: Bintie Line 1 (Binhai Metro Line 1)
- Status: Under construction
- Owner: Tianjin Rail Transit
- Locale: Binhai New Area, Tianjin, China
- Termini: Xinjiayuandong; Xinchengsi
- Stations: 22 (Phase 1)

Service
- Type: Rapid transit
- System: Tianjin Rail Transit
- Operator(s): Tianjin Binhai New Area Rail Transit Investment Development Co., Ltd
- Depot: Huanggang depot
- Rolling stock: CRRC Tangshan 6 cars type A rolling stock

Technical
- Line length: 22.5 km (14.0 mi) (Phase 1 North section); 31.5 km (19.6 mi) (Phase 1 total)
- Number of tracks: 2
- Track gauge: 1,435 mm (4 ft 8 1/2 in)
- Electrification: 1.5 kV DC Overhead catenary contact
- Operating speed: 80 km/h (50 mph) (Maximum design speed)

Line B1 of Tianjin Metro is an under construction metro line serving Tianjin, China. The Phase 1 Northern section of Line B1 is spanning 22.5 km long, with a total investment of 21.89 billion RMB. Line B1 is known as the "north-south central axis" of Binhai New Area, spanning 31.5 km with all 22 stations underground and a total investment of 27.6 billion RMB. Line B1 is scheduled to commence operation by the end of 2026.

As of March 2025, the main structures of 16 stations have been completed, 13 out of 19 stations is connected.

== History ==
Construction of Line B1 was kicked off on 23 February 2016.

On 25 October 2024, Tianjin Metro began receiving their first rolling stock set of Line B1.

On 31 October 2024, the right shield underground section from Yushandao Station to Xinbeilu Station was completed.

On 9 March 2025, the section from Yushandao station to Chezhanbeilu station was completed.

On 12 January 2026, the underground section from Xinjiayuanxi Station to Guoxiangxidao Station was successfully connected.

On 3 June 2026, the underground section from Xinjiayuandong Station to Tanggu Station was completed.

== Stations ==
All 22 stations are underground.

| Station name | | Transfer | Distance km | Location |
| Pinyin | Chinese | Transfer | Distance km | Location |
|---|---|---|---|---|
| Xinjiayuandong | 欣嘉园东 | | | Binhai New Area |
| Xinjiayuan | 欣嘉园 | | | Binhai New Area |
| Xinjiayuanbei | 欣嘉园北 | | | Binhai New Area |
| Xinjiayuanxi | 欣嘉园西 | | | Binhai New Area |
| Guoxiangxidao | 国祥西道 | | | Binhai New Area |
| Binhaixizhan | 滨海西站 | B3 Z2 | | Binhai New Area |
| Dijiudajie | 第九大街 | | | Binhai New Area |
| Yunshandao | 云山道 | | | Binhai New Area |
| Xinbeilu | 新北路 | | | Binhai New Area |
| Chezhanbeilu | 车站北路 | B2 | | Binhai New Area |
| Guangzhoudao | 广州道 | B4 | | Binhai New Area |
| Tanggu | 塘沽 | Tianjin Metro Line 9 | | Binhai New Area |
| Waitangongyuan | 外滩公园 | | | Binhai New Area |
| Wenhuajie | 文化街 | B5 | | Binhai New Area |
| Binhaizhan | 滨海站 | Z1 Z4 | | Binhai New Area |
| Youyidao | 友谊道 | B3 | | Binhai New Area |
| Jinlindao | 金临道 | | | Binhai New Area |
| Tianjindadao | 天津大道 | B2 | | Binhai New Area |
| Xinchengyi | 新城一 | | | Binhai New Area |
| Xinchenger | 新城二 | | | Binhai New Area |
| Xinchengsan | 新城三 | Z4 | | Binhai New Area |
| Xinchengsi | 新城四 | | | Binhai New Area |

== Rolling stocks ==
Line B1 uses 30 sets of rolling stocks which are type 6A and were produced by CRRC Tangshan, with an estimated value of 1.1 billion RMB. This will mark the first line of Tianjin Metro system to use A-type high capacity rolling stock instead of ordinary B-type.
