= Binhai railway station =

Railway station in Binhai, Tianjin, China

Binhai 滨海
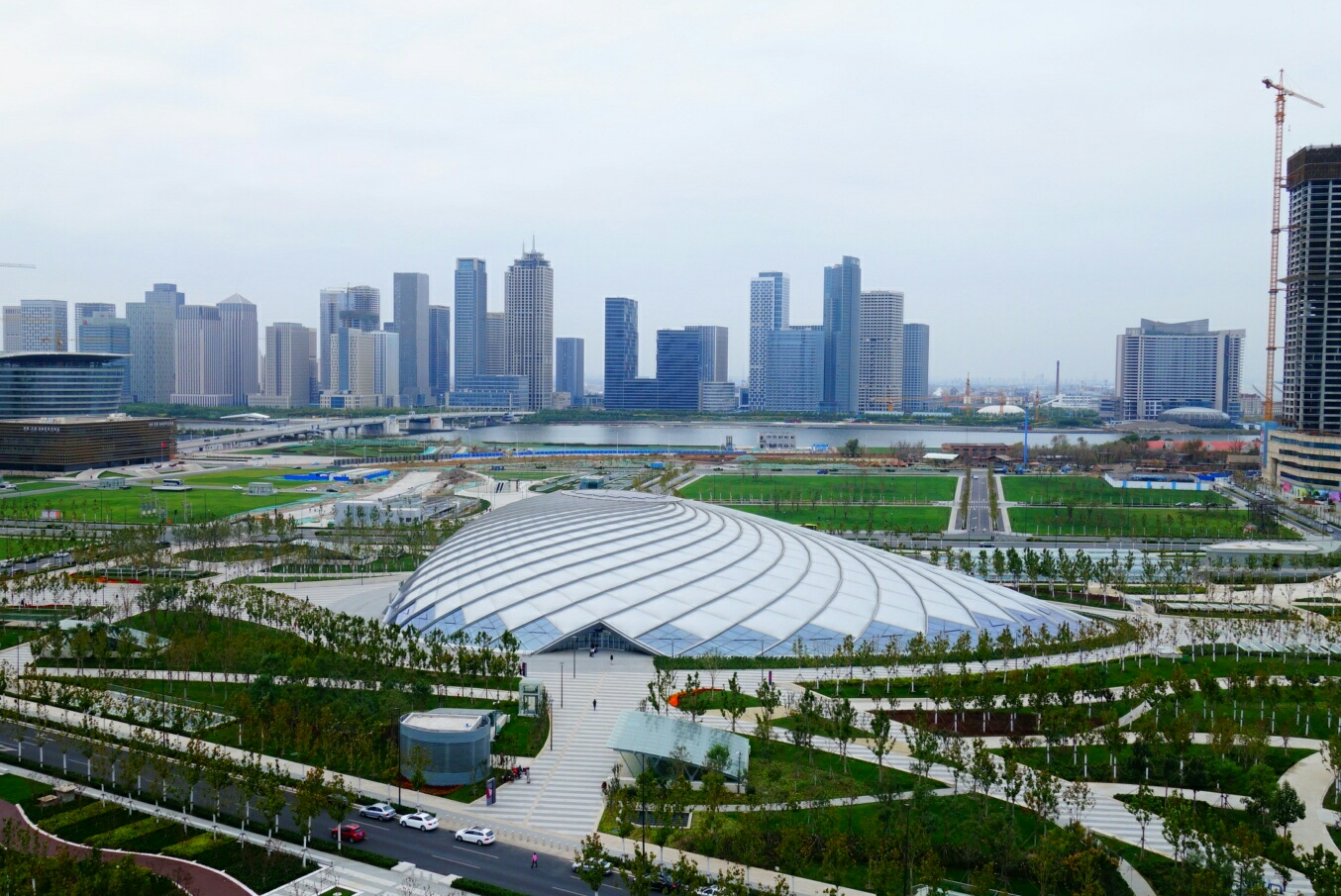
- Single layer steel shell structure, photo captured before renaming

General information
- Location: Binhai New Area, Tianjin; China
- Coordinates: 39°00′12″N 117°40′43″E
- Operator: Beijing Railway Bureau; China Railway Corporation
- Line: Beijing–Tianjin intercity railway
- Platforms: 6

Construction
- Structure type: Underground
- Architect: Skidmore, Owings & Merrill; Arup Group

Other information
- Station code: TMIS: 10140; Telegraph: YKP; Pinyin: BHA

History
- Opened: 2015

Services
Preceding station	China Railway High-speed	Following station
Tanggu towards Beijing South	Beijing–Tianjin intercity railway	Terminus
Location

Binhai railway station (Chinese: 滨海站; pinyin: Bīnhǎi Zhàn), formerly Yujiapu railway station, is an underground railway station located in Binhai, Tianjin, People's Republic of China. It is the southern terminus of the Beijing–Tianjin intercity railway and serves the Yujiapu Financial District, an area with many new skyscrapers. It is considered one of the four main rail transportation hubs for Tianjin with Tianjin, Tianjin West and Binhai West railway station. It is to be served by the Tianjin Metro lines B1 and Z4.

== History ==
The station's construction started on February 27, 2009. On September 1, construction personnel from Yujiapu Station entered the site to carry out the main construction of the station building. The station's construction started on February 27, 2009. On November 18, 2013, the steel structure dome unloading work was completed at Yujiapu Station, and the main structural engineering of the station building was completed. On May 5, 2010, the construction of intermediate piles was carried out at Jiabao Station. On August 20, 2014, the installation work of the steel structure water tank and glass curtain wall prototype section was completed at Yujiapu Station, and the installation of the membrane structure was carried out. The station was completed on August 8, 2015, and it was opened to traffic on September 20, 2015. The name of station was changed from Yujiapu to Binhai on January 5, 2019. Simultaneously, another station that was previously named Binhai had its name changed to Binhai West.

== Future ==
Binhai railway station will be the northern terminus of the Tianjin–Weifang high-speed railway, turning the current terminus station into a through station.

== Gallery ==
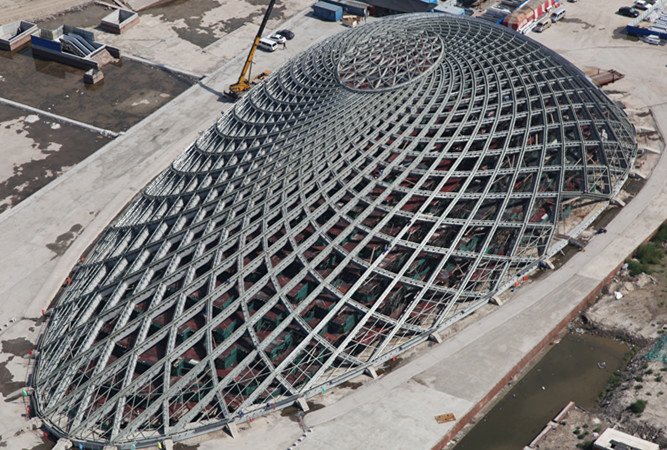
Roof structure under construction

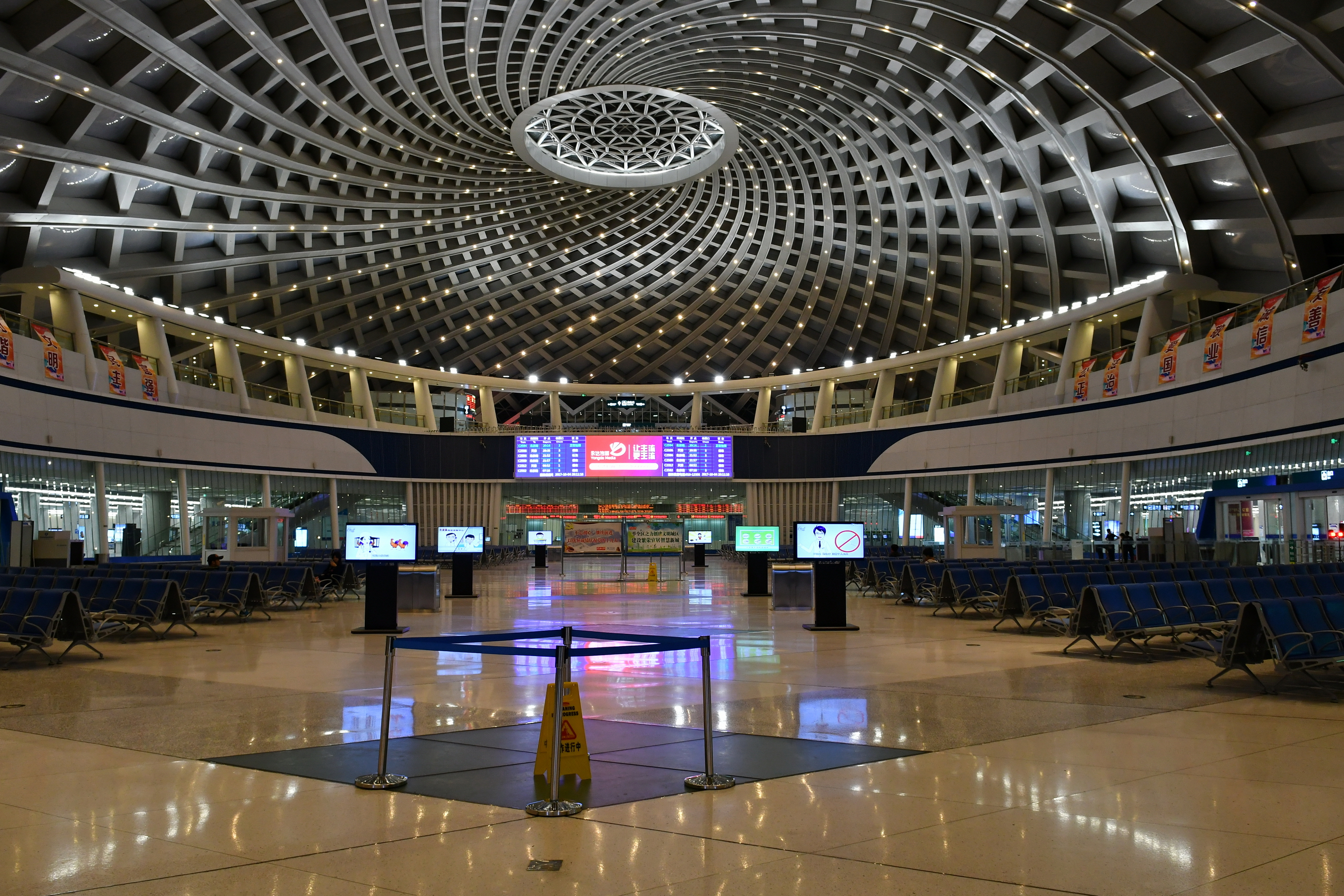
Interior of Binhai railway station waiting hall

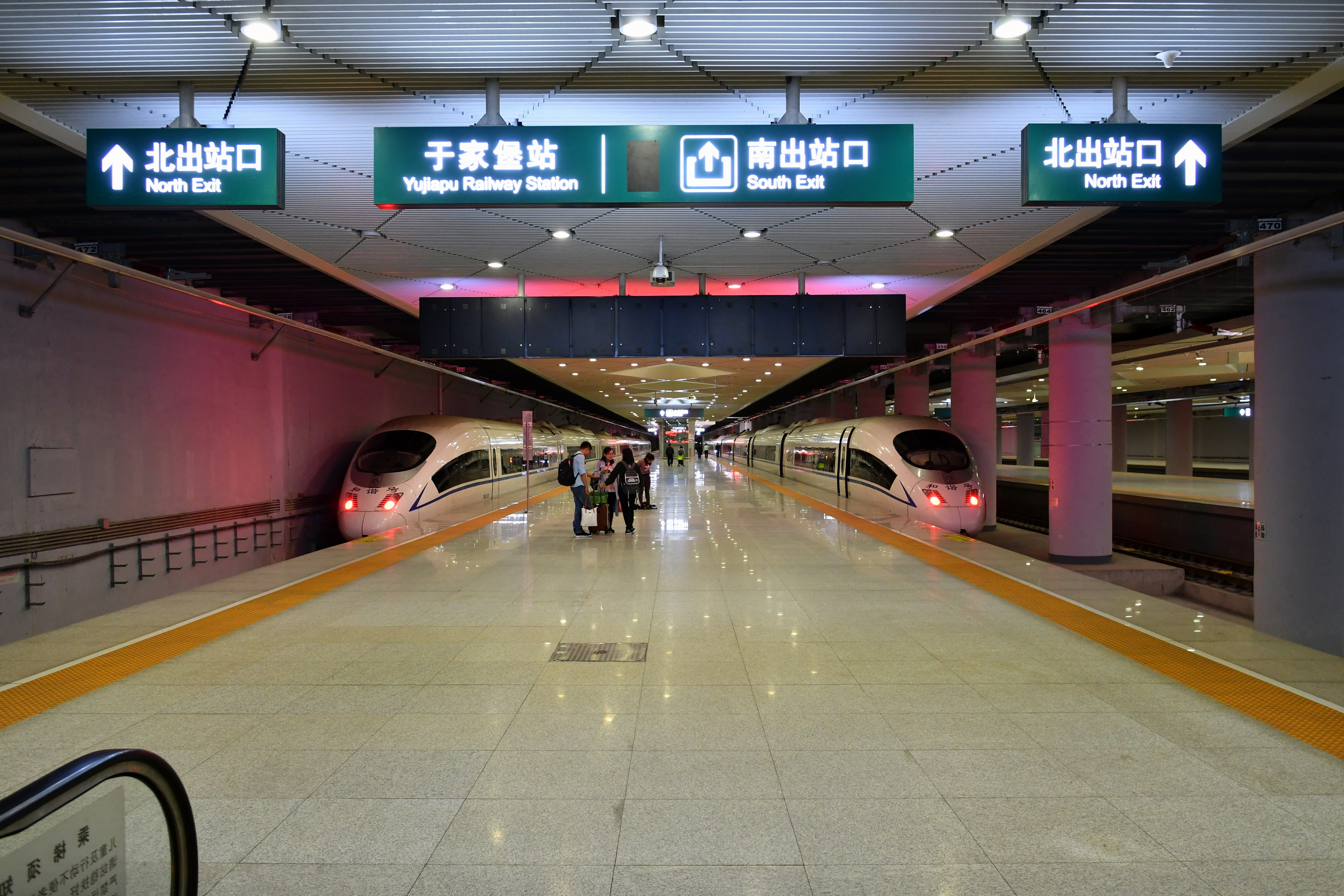
The station at platform level
