= Beijing–Tianjin intercity railway =

High-speed rail service between Beijing and Tianjin, China

Coordinates: 39.5054°N 116.8259°E

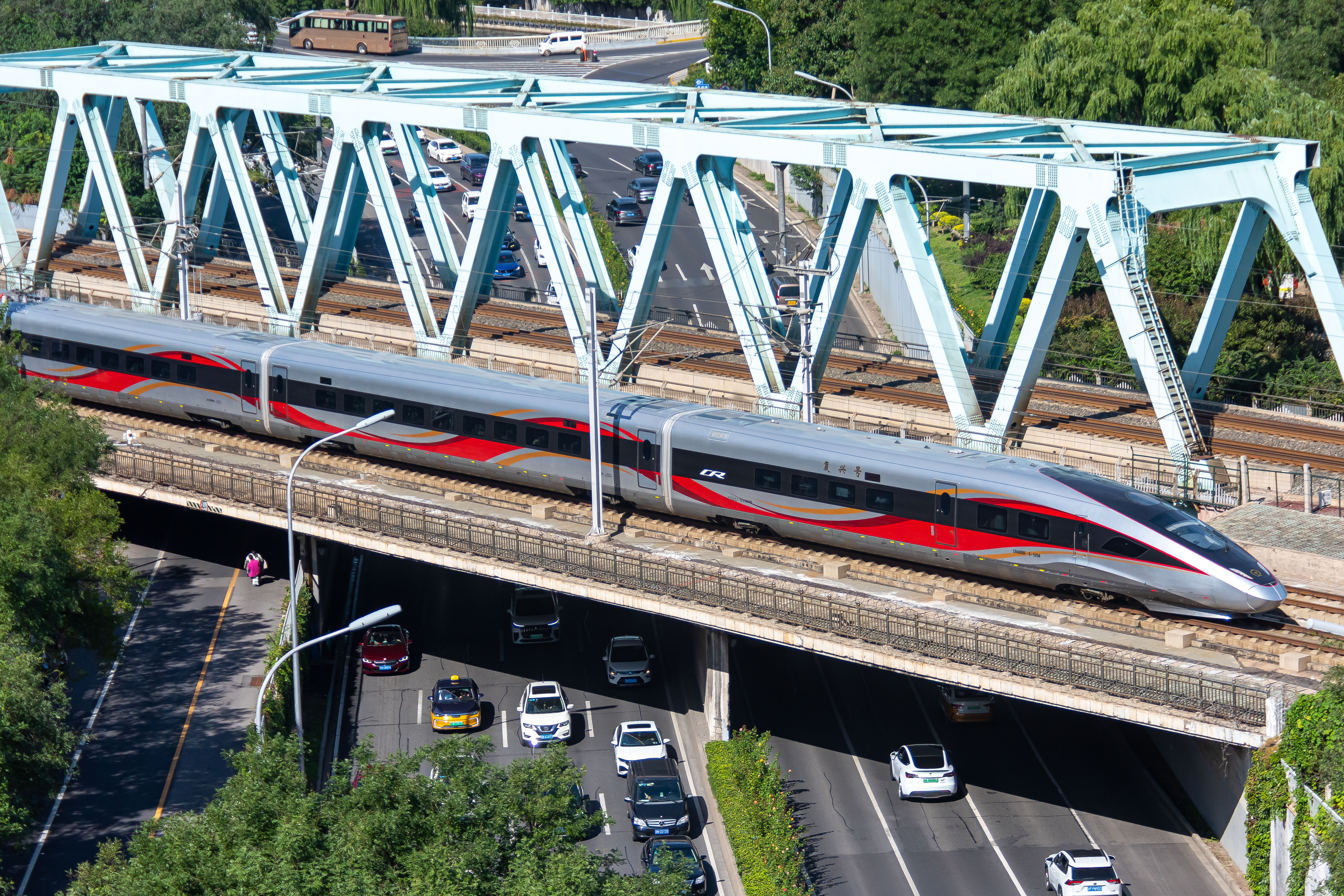
- A CR400BF-S high-speed train on the Beijing–Tianjin intercity railway

Overview
- Native name: 京津城际铁路 京津高铁
- Status: Operational
- Owner: China Railway
- Locale: North China
- Termini: Beijing South; Binhai
- Stations: 9

Service
- Type: High-speed rail
- System: China Railway High-speed
- Operator: China Railway Beijing Group
- Rolling stock: CR400BF

History
- Opened: 1 August 2008; 18 years ago
- Last extension: 20 September 2015; 11 years ago

Technical
- Line length: 161 km (100 mi)
- Number of tracks: 2 (Double-track)
- Character: Elevated
- Track gauge: 1,435 mm (4 ft 8 1/2 in) standard gauge
- Electrification: 25 kV 50 Hz AC (Overhead line)
- Operating speed: 350 km/h (220 mph)
- Signalling: CTCS-3
Route map
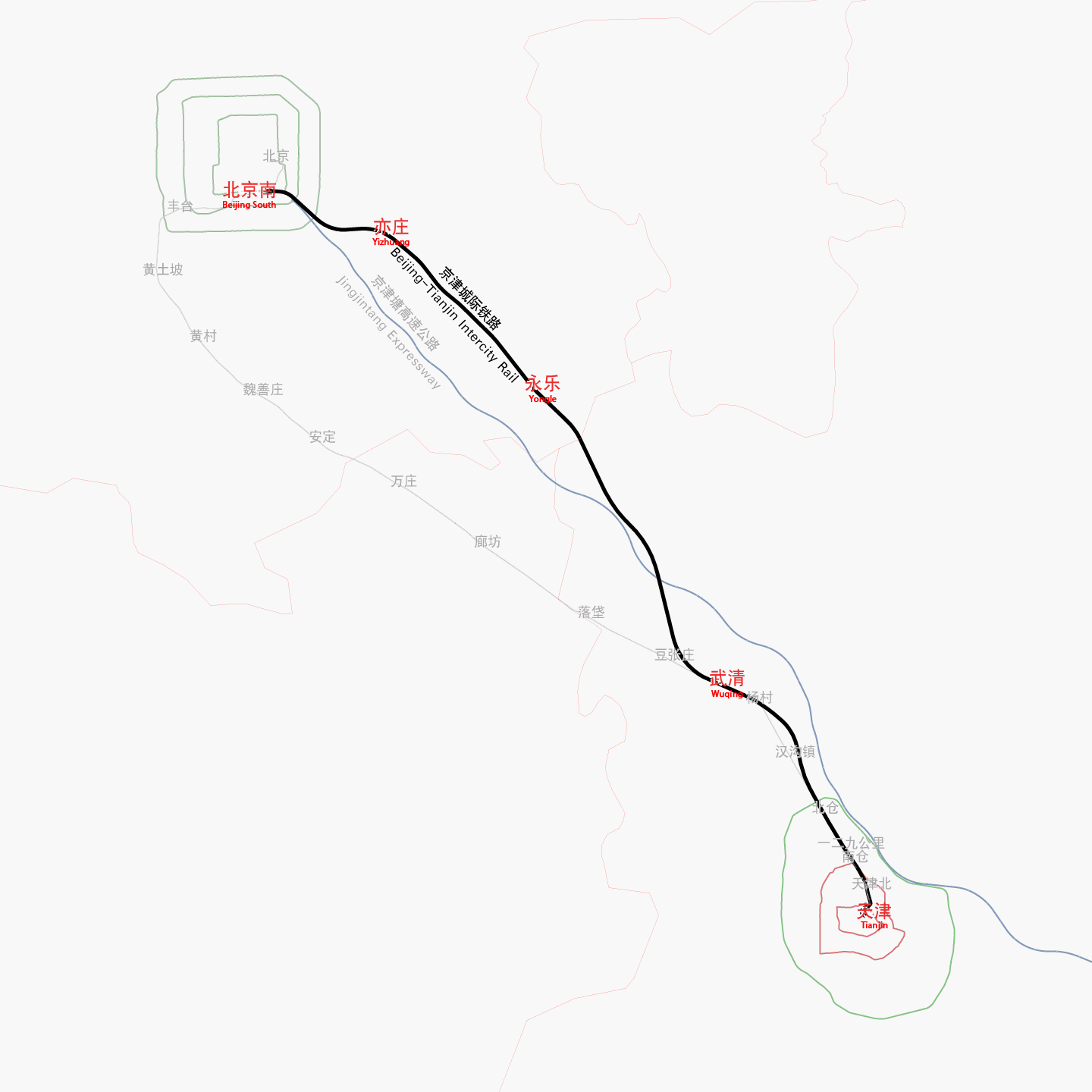
Template:Beijing–Tianjin intercity railway RDT

The Beijing–Tianjin intercity railway (simplified Chinese: 京津城际铁路; traditional Chinese: 京津城際鐵路; pinyin: Jīng-Jīn chéngjì tiělù) is a Chinese high-speed railway that runs 117 kilometres (72.7 mi) line between Beijing and Tianjin. Designed for passenger traffic only, the Chinese government built the line to accommodate trains traveling at a maximum speed of 350 km/h (217 mph), and currently carries CRH high-speed trains running speeds up to 350 km/h (217 mph) since August 2018.

When the line opened on August 1, 2008, it set the record for the fastest conventional train service in the world by top speed, and reduced travel time between the two largest cities in northern China from 70 to 30 minutes. A second phase of construction extended this line from the urban area of Tianjin to Yujiapu railway station (now Binhai railway station) in Tianjin's Binhai New Area was opened on September 20, 2015.

The line is projected to approach operating capacity in the first half of 2016. Anticipating this, a second parallel line, the Beijing–Binhai intercity railway, commenced construction on December 29, 2015. It will run from Beijing Sub-Center railway station to Binhai railway station via Baodi and Tianjin Binhai International Airport, along a new route to the northeast of the Beijing–Tianjin ICR.

== Route and stations ==
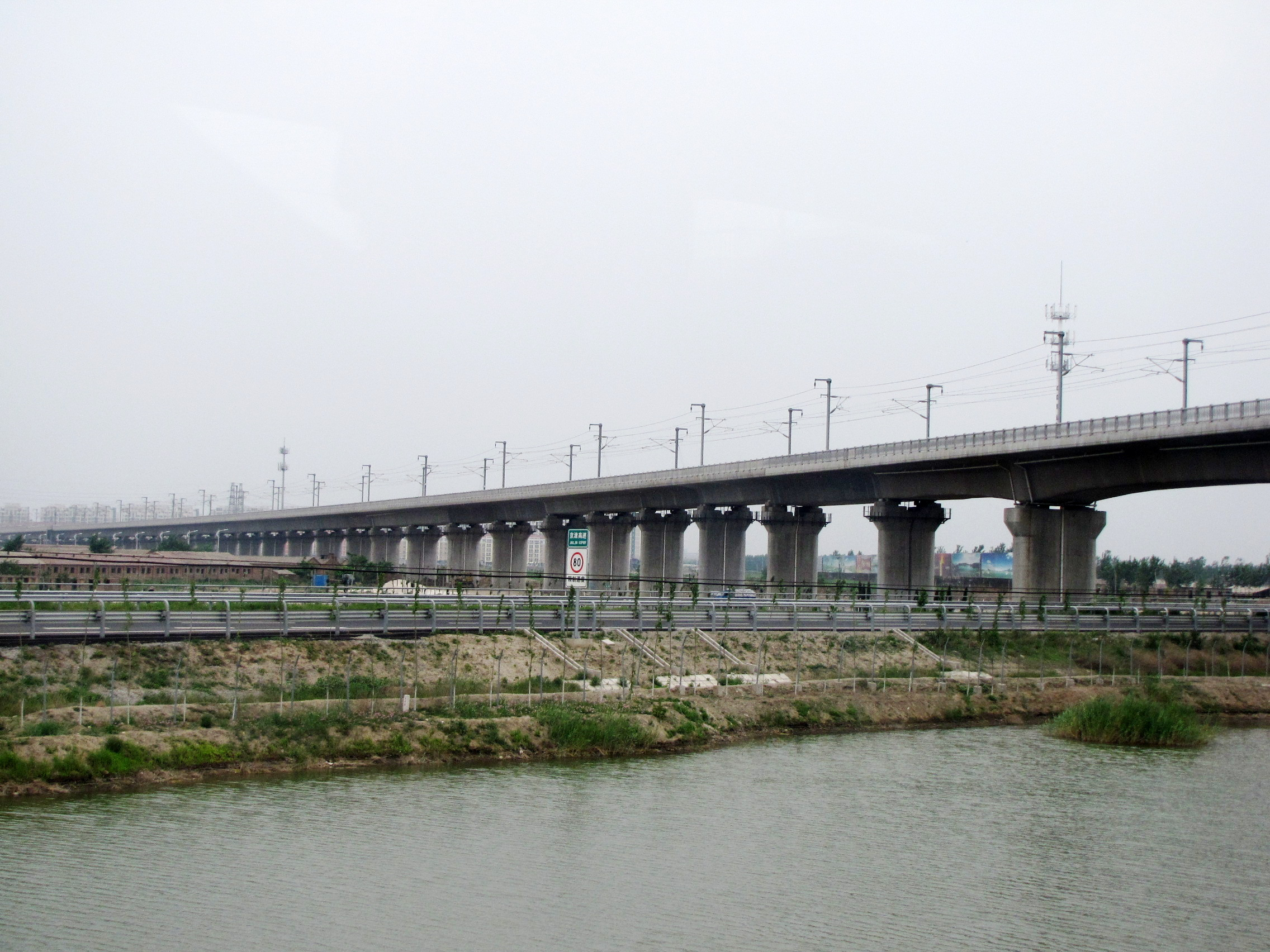
Viaduct on the Beijing–Tianjin intercity railway

=== Beijing to Tianjin ===
From Beijing South railway station, the line runs in a southeasterly direction, following the Beijing–Tianjin–Tanggu Expressway to Tianjin. It has three intermediate stations at Yizhuang, Yongle (reserved station) and Wuqing. The service has peak speed between cities.

As an intercity line, it will provide train service only between the two metropolitan areas, unlike the Beijing–Shanghai high-speed railway which will continue beyond Shanghai.

The Beijing–Tianjin intercity railway has a current length of 116.939 km (72.663 mi) (fare mileage: 120 km (74.565 mi)), of which roughly 100 km (62.137 mi) is built on viaducts and the last 17 kilometres (10.563 mi) on an embankment. The elevated track ensures level tracks over uneven terrain and eliminates the trains having to slow down to safely navigate through at-grade road crossings.

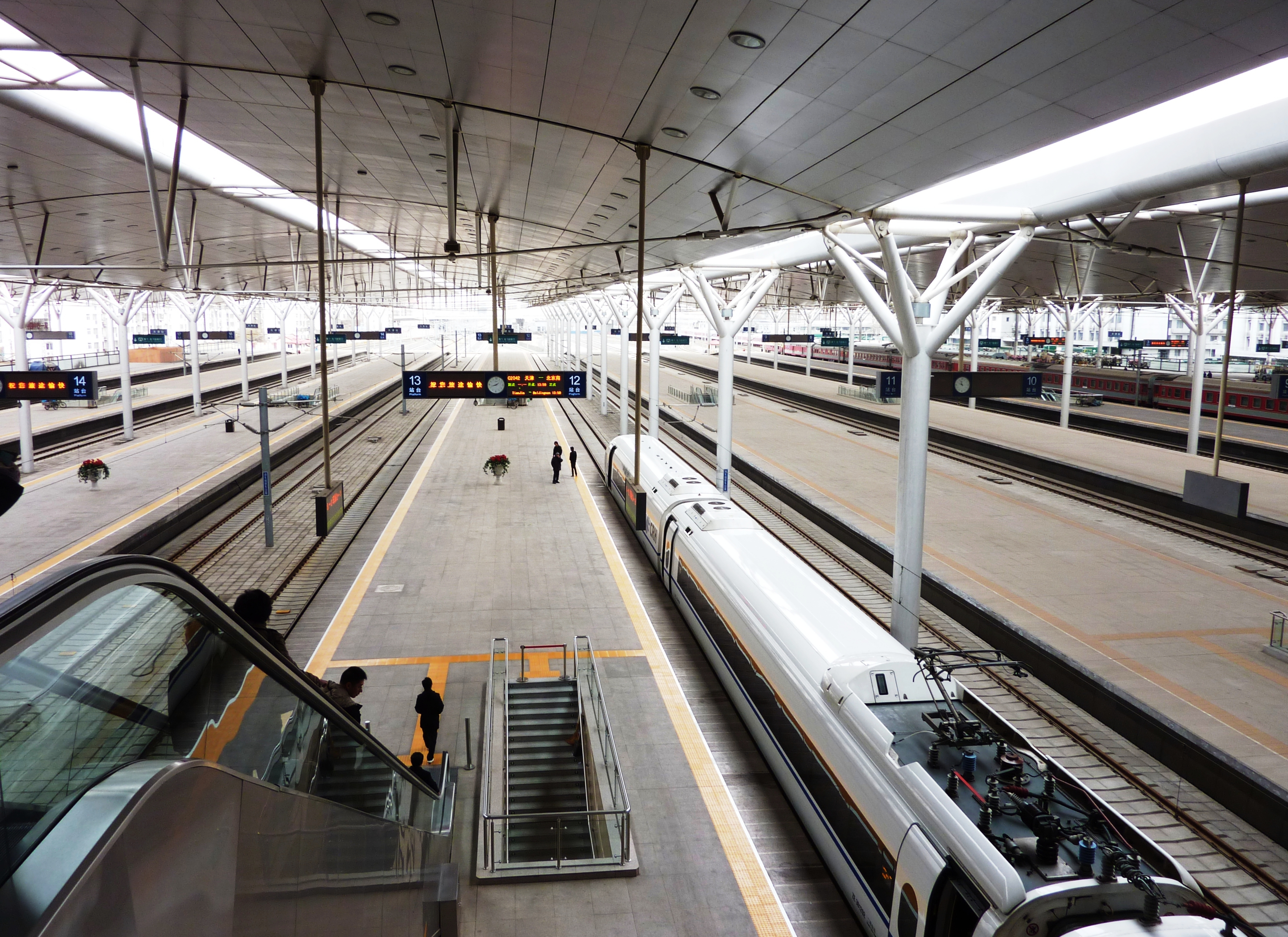
Tianjin railway station

=== Extension to Binhai New Area ===
Sometimes known as the Tianjin–Binhai intercity railway, this 44.68 km (27.763 mi) extension continues southeasterly from Tianjin railway station, following the conventional railway to Tanggu railway station but built on elevated piers with three new stations were to be added. It passes a blockpost at Airport West, through Junliangcheng North railway station to Tanggu railway station before entering a tunnel to an underground station, Yujiapu railway station (now Binhai railway station).

Junctions have been built along the line allowing services to branch off to a new station under Tianjin Binhai International Airport and to Binhai West railway station on the Tianjin–Qinhuangdao high-speed railway. Trial operations of the extension started on August 14, 2015, with an official opening on September 20, 2015. the railway reduced travel times from Beijing South railway station to Binhai railway station to 1 hour 2 minutes and from Tianjin railway station to Binhai railway station to 23 minutes.

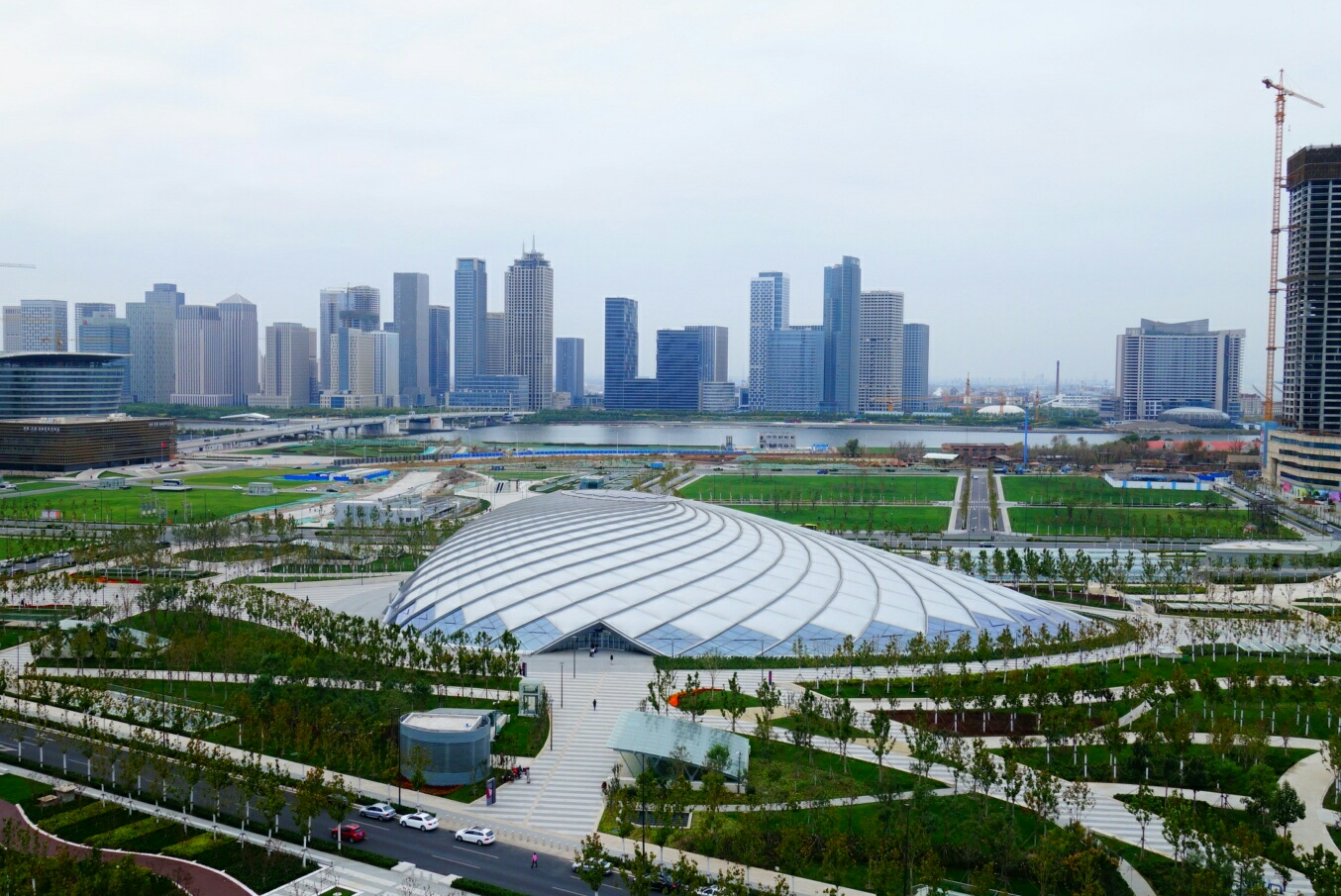
Binhai railway station (formerly known as Yujiapu)

== Service ==
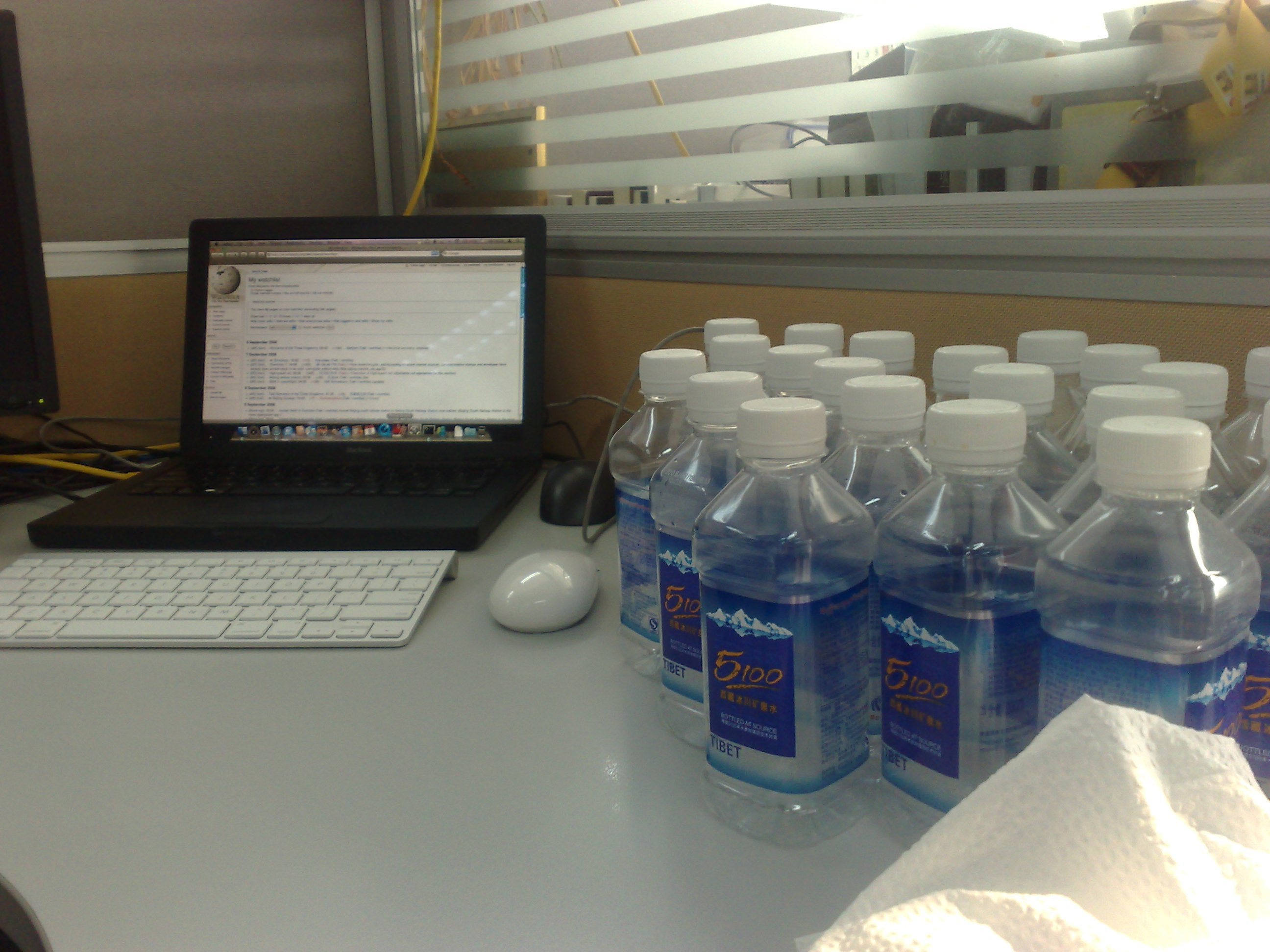
"5100" brand mineral water. A passenger can get a complimentary bottle on showing his or her intercity train ticket

These intercity trains are designated by the prefixed "C" (城) followed by four digits, from C2001 to C2298. Of these, C2001–C2198 are non-stop trains from Beijing South to Tianjin. The odd numbers for trains departing from Beijing South and even numbers for those running to Beijing South. Trains numbered C2201–C2268 are trains from Beijing South and Tianjin that stop on the way at Wuqing station. Trains C2271–C2298 run from Beijing South to Tanggu.

The line opened on August 1, 2008, with 47 daily pairs of intercity trains between Beijing South and Tianjin. Since September 14, 2008, 10 more pairs of trains were added, reducing the minimum interval from 15 minutes to 10 minutes. On September 24, 2008, 4 pairs of trains extended to Tanggu along the conventional railway. On September 28, 2008, 2 more pairs of trains were added into service. Frequencies have consistently been increased since to cope with rising demand, reaching 136 pairs of trains operating daily by 2018.

In addition to the intercity service, 13 pairs of trains were diverted to this line from the preexisting Beijing–Shanghai (Jinghu) railway, including trains from Beijing South to Jinan, Qingdao, Shanghai, and Tianjin West. With the opening of the Beijing–Shanghai high-speed railway, these trains have been diverted to the new line.

=== Tickets ===
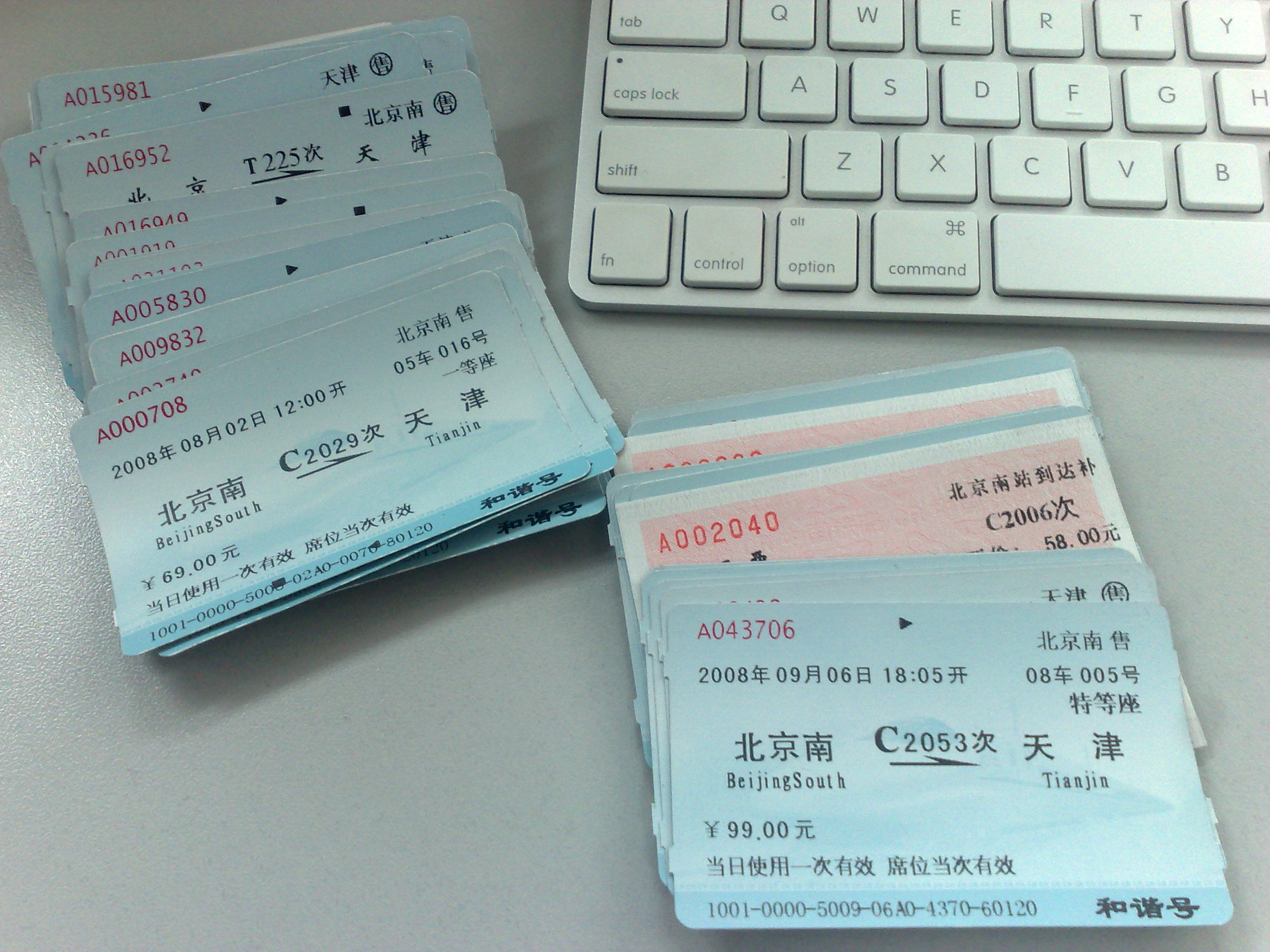
Tickets bought at high-speed railway stations are blue magnetic tickets, different from the regular pink tickets

Manual ticket windows and automatic ticket machines developed by GDT are installed at each station along the Beijing–Tianjin intercity railroad (including Beijing South Station, Tianjin Station, and Wuqing Station). The vending machines can accept RMB 100, RMB 50, RMB 20, RMB 10, and RMB 5 bills and support payment by bank card. As of June 2009, tickets sold through the vending machines have accounted for 24% of all Beijing–Tianjin intercity train tickets.

On March 7, 2009, the Beijing–Tianjin Intercity Railway launched the "Beijing–Tianjin Intercity Railway Express Card", which uses a non-contact IC card system and can be recharged repeatedly. The "Beijing–Tianjin Intercity Railway Express Card" is divided into two types: Ordinary Card and Gold Card. The Ordinary Card is priced at RMB 1,000 and can be used in the second-class compartment of the Beijing–Tianjin Intercity Railway. The Gold Card is priced at RMB 3,000 and allows passengers to travel in the first-class compartment of the Beijing–Tianjin Intercity Railway, with the maximum amount of stored value not exceeding RMB 5,000. As of July 22, 2009, 13,700 Fast pass cards have been sold, and the total number of cardholders is 82,000, with the highest number of cardholders on a single train being 93. On June 1, 2011, the Beijing–Tianjin Intercity Fast pass card system was upgraded to match the real-name system of national train tickets, and all cardholders are required to bring their original valid IDs, otherwise they will not be able to enter the station and ride. Since July 22, 2012, the former "Beijing–Tianjin Intercity Railway Express Card" has been discontinued and the newly introduced "China Railway Silver Pass Card" has replaced the "Beijing–Tianjin Intercity Railway Express Card".

From June 12, 2011, online railroad ticketing was first tested on the Beijing–Tianjin Intercity Railway. Passengers can pay for their tickets online using bank cards (including debit and credit cards) from the Industrial and Commercial Bank of China, the Agricultural Bank of China, the Bank of China and China Merchants Bank or through the China UnionPay online payment system and can make subsequent ticket changes and refunds. After purchasing a ticket, if passengers use a second-generation ID card, passengers can use their ID card as a travel voucher to check their ticket directly at the entry/exit gates; if passengers use other documents or need reimbursement vouchers, they can exchange their ID card for a paper ticket at the station ticket window or at a sales outlet.

On February 6, 2017, the mayor of Tianjin, Wang Dongfeng, said at the symposium of the central media's "Beijing–Tianjin–Hebei Cooperative Development Research Line" interview group that the Beijing–Tianjin intercity railway is expected to implement a monthly ticket system, and from May 1, 2017, in order to facilitate the travel of commuters between Beijing and Tianjin, China Railway Yin Tong Payment Co. "China Railway Beijing–Tianjin Intercity City Discount Card" for frequent commuters of the Beijing–Tianjin Intercity Railway, who can enjoy certain discounts for a certain number of purchases. As of April 30, 2018, a total of 20,160 "Beijing–Tianjin Intercity City Discount Cards" were sold, including 2,911 gold cards and 17,249 silver cards, with a total of 962,600 passengers taking the card.

== Technical information ==
The line is the first railway in China to be built for operational speeds above 300 km/h (186 mph). This railway line allows speeds up to 350 km/h (217 mph). A trip between Beijing and Tianjin takes 30 minutes.

High-speed lines

113.5 kilometers (70.5 mi) of the line is ballast-free track, using the plate ballast-free track technology imported from the German company Borg. A total of 36,092 pieces of Borg track plates were used on the whole line. In addition, in order to save land use, the Beijing-Tianjin Intercity Railway uses bridges instead of roads on a large scale, with 87% of the entire line being bridges, with a cumulative length of 101 km (63 mi), including 5 special bridges. Each kilometer of bridge can save 30,000 square meters (320,000 sq ft) of land compared with the traditional roadbed. In addition, soft soil, loose and soft soil areas roadbed design, bridge deformation and foundation settlement control technology are adopted. The railroad track uses the advanced welding process of long steel rails, and the comprehensive inspection shows that the line quality is stable. The expected service life of the ballast-free track is 60 years, while the service life of the main structure of the bridge is up to 100 years, reducing the comprehensive maintenance costs.

Traction power supply

When a high-speed train runs at a speed of 350 kilometers per hour (220 mph), that is, nearly 100 meters per second, there are high requirements for the stability of the current receiving between the catenary and the pantograph, as well as the power supply equipment for electrified railways. The Beijing–Tianjin intercity railway adopts SCADA system for remote monitoring, and for the first time in China adopts a magnesium-copper alloy, small cross-section (120 mm (4.7 in)), high tension, lightweight simple chain-type belt reinforced wire suspension catenary system. There are 3 traction substations, 4 divisional substations and 2 switching substations along the whole line.

Communication Signal and Dispatch

The Beijing-Tianjin intercity railroad adopts GSM-R railroad digital mobile communication system for the whole line, which realizes mobile voice communication and wireless data transmission; it also uses ETCS-1 level and CTCS-2 level signaling systems, as well as CTCS-3D (China high-speed railroad train control terrestrial digital transmission system) level signaling system, and the minimum departure interval is designed to be 3 minutes. In terms of operation scheduling, Beijing-Tianjin Intercity Railway applies decentralized self-regulating dispatching centralized system (CTC) to realize centralized dispatching control for trains running on the whole line.

Safety and security

In order to avoid natural disasters affecting the safety of railroad traffic, the whole line of Beijing-Tianjin Intercity Railway has established a disaster prevention and safety monitoring system including wind warning monitoring, earthquake monitoring system and foreign object intrusion monitoring. In addition, the whole railroad line also has a comprehensive grounding system, ballastless track, contact network columns, station platforms, sound barriers, retaining walls are connected to ground.

== History ==
=== Preliminary preparation ===
In February 2002, Binglian Liu, a professor at Nankai University in Tianjin, first proposed the construction of a high-speed railroad between Beijing and Tianjin during a discussion on the "Beijing-Tianjin Economic Integration Strategy Study and Proposal". In June 2003, the Ministry of Railways and the municipal governments of Beijing and Tianjin began preliminary discussions. In January 2004, the executive meeting of the State Council adopted the Medium and Long-Term Railway Network Plan, in which the Beijing-Tianjin Intercity Railway was included, and on October 24, 2004, the Ministry of Railways, Beijing Municipal Government and Tianjin Municipal Government jointly determined the route plan. On March 3, 2005, Zhijun Liu, Minister of Railway, Qishan Wang, Mayor of Beijing, and Xianglong Dai, Mayor of Tianjin, co-chaired the meeting of the Beijing-Tianjin Intercity Rail Transit System Construction Leading Group. The meeting determined the financing method of the railroad construction.

=== Construction history ===
On July 4, 2005, the construction of the Beijing-Tianjin Intercity Railway officially started. The entire Beijing-Tianjin intercity rail transit system construction project adopts the "two points and one line" construction strategy, which is divided into three parts: the Beijing–Tianjin intercity railway, Beijing South Railway Station, and Tianjin Station transportation hub reconstruction project, which are carried out simultaneously. In August 2007, the roadbed and bridge works were completed. On October 31, 2007, the track Borg board laying was completed. On November 13, 2007, the laying of the track began. The 100-meter-long steel rails used on the entire line of the Beijing-Tianjin Intercity Railway are all produced by Panzhihua Iron and Steel Company, with a total weight of 27,000 tons, and the 500-meter-long steel rails are welded on site. On December 16, 2007, the entire track was laid. On December 19, 2007, the construction of the electrified catenary under the charge of the China Railway Electrification Bureau was in full swing. On February 2, 2008, the electrification project was completed, and the grid began to be electrified. In March 2008, the construction of the Beijing–Tianjin intercity railway entered the stage of system joint debugging and joint testing, including four parts: EMU type test, integration test, comprehensive test and trial operation. On May 13, 2008, a CRH2C electric multiple units from Beijing South Railway Station to Tianjin Railway Station created the fastest speed of a wheel-rail train in China at that time at a speed of 372 kilometers per hour during the test. On June 24, 2008, a CRH3C EMU reached a speed of 394.3 kilometers per hour during the test on the Beijing-Tianjin Intercity Railway, breaking the record set by the CRH2C EMU on May 13. And refresh the highest speed of China's current wheel-rail train. On July 1, 2008, the Beijing-Tianjin Intercity Railway began trial operation without carrying passengers according to the official operating conditions to verify the tracking interval of trains, the interval between trains receiving and departing at stations, etc., and at the same time arrange simulated equipment failures and emergency response in bad weather drill.

=== Open for operation ===
The Beijing-Tianjin Intercity Railway was officially opened to traffic on August 1, 2008, with Vice Premier Zhang Dejiang, Beijing Municipal Party Secretary Liu Qi and Tianjin Municipal Party Secretary Zhang Gaoli attending the opening ceremony. On September 27, 2008, Premier Wen Jiabao visited the Beijing-Tianjin Intercity Railway and put forward the requirements of "quality, energy saving, land saving and environmental protection" for the railroad construction. On March 4, 2009, Hong Kong Chief Executive Donald Tsang visited Tianjin by the Beijing-Tianjin Intercity High-speed Train, and on August 1, 2009, the Beijing-Tianjin Intercity Railway celebrated its first anniversary of operation. Within one year, the Beijing-Tianjin intercity high-speed trains sent a total of 18.7 million passengers, the train punctuality rate reached 98%, the average train occupancy rate reached nearly 70%, and more than 200 heads of state, dignitaries and railroad inspection teams from all over the world, including the United States, Russia and Japan, visited the Beijing-Tianjin intercity railroad.

On October 1, 2009, construction of the Beijing-Tianjin Intercity Extension, or Jinbin Intercity Railway, began, with an estimated 40+ minutes from Beijing South Station to Binhai Station in the core area of Binhai New Area. The Yujiapu extension opened on September 20, 2015, and the Beijing-Tianjin intercity train no longer travels the Jinshan Railway when running between the central city of Tianjin and the core area of the Binhai New Area, and the running time has been significantly shortened.

== Ridership ==
Before the line was finished, it was expected that the railway line would handle 32 million passengers in 2008 and 54 million passengers in 2015.

The line opened on August 1, 2008, just before the opening of the 2008 Summer Olympics, which held some football matches in Tianjin. The introduction of high-speed rail service significantly boosted rail travel between the two cities. In 2007, conventional train service between Beijing and Tianjin delivered 8.3 million rides. In the first year of high-speed rail service, from August 2008 to July 2009, total rail passenger volume between Beijing and Tianjin reached 18.7 million, of which 15.85 million rode the Intercity trains. Meanwhile, during the same period, ridership on intercity buses fell by 36.8%. As of September 2010, daily ridership averaged 69,000 or an annual rate of 25.2 million. The line has a capacity of delivering 100 million rides annually and initial estimated repayment period of 16 years.

From 2008 to 2013, ridership grew at an annual rate of 20% reaching a cumulative 88 million passengers. In the first half of 2018 the line was carrying over 82,000 passengers each day.

== Finances ==
At the start of construction, an expected ¥12.3 billion (US$1.48 billion) was expected to be invested into the Beijing–Tianjin intercity railway. At the time of construction, the Ministry of Railways and the Tianjian government had each contributed ¥2.6 billion (US$325 million) to the project, while the central government requisitioned land and paid for the resettlement of those affected. However, it would later cost $2.34 billion to build.

As of 2010, the line cost ¥1.8 billion per annum to operate, including ¥0.6 billion in interest payments on its ¥10 billion of loan obligations. The terms of the loans range from 5–10 years at interest rates of 6.3 to 6.8 percent. In its first year of operation from August 1, 2008, to July 31, 2009, the line generated ¥1.1 billion in revenues on 18.7 million rides delivered and incurred a loss of ¥0.7 billion. In the second year, ridership rose to 22.3 million and revenues improved to ¥1.4 billion, which narrowed to below ¥0.5 billion. To break even, the line must deliver 30 million rides annually. To be able to repay principal, ridership would need to exceed 40 million. As of 2012, Beijing–Tianjin Intercity Railway officially reported to break even financially, defined as operational costs with debt payments is matched with revenue. By 2015, the line is operating with an operational profit.

== Long-term planning ==
Beijing-Tianjin intercity railroad will lead the future liaison line through Nan Cang Bridge to access the intercity field of Tianjin West Station. The Beijing-Shanghai high-speed railway Beijing-Tianjin intercity liaison line Nan Cang Special Bridge project starts at the Pu Ji He Dao overpass and extends to the east of Tianjin West Station in a southwesterly direction, with a total length of 4.38 km. In turn, it realizes the connection between Beijing-Tianjin intercity railroad and Beijing-Shanghai high-speed railroad. The liaison line has been basically completed and will be ready for operation after the construction of the intercity field at Tianjin West Station.

== See also ==
- Fastest trains in China
