= Ji Canal River =

Stream in China

The Ji Canal River or Jiyunhe (Chinese: 蓟运河; lit. 'Ji Canal') is a semi-artificial river in North China Plain near the major city of Tianjin. It is an important part of Hai River watershed system. The total length of Jiyunhe as of today is about 145 km and it drains into the Bohai Sea near Tanggu. Jiyunhe was originally a natural river (named Baoqiu River before Sui and Tang dynasties and Chao River before Ming dynasty) derived from a mountain called Baoqiu north of the Great Wall near Zunhua. The original length of this river was over 310 km. The section south of the Great Wall was artificially widened by Cao Cao during the Han dynasty so that it became navigable and thus it could be used to supply the frontline in the northeast. The upstream section of the river was gradually abandoned. In Ming dynasty, the channel was artificially broadened again to make it navigable to bigger ships. Since then, it became a supply line of Tianjin. Grains were shipped to Tianjin and nearby towns on this river, so it got a nickname of Grain River and was finally renamed as Jiyunhe which literally means Canal of Ji.
