= Line Z4 =

Metro line in Tianjin

Overview
- Other name: Bintie Line 2 (Binhai Metro Line 2)
- Status: Partly operational
- Locale: Tianjin, China
- Termini: Zhaishang; Beitang
- Stations: 10 (in operation); 24 (total)

Service
- Type: Rapid transit
- System: Tianjin Metro
- Rolling stock: CRRC Dalian 6 cars type A

History
- Opened: 18 January 2026; 7 months ago

Technical
- Line length: 23.738 km (14.750 mi) (In operation); 43.7 km (27.2 mi) (Total)
- Number of tracks: 2
- Track gauge: 1,435 mm (4 ft 8 1/2 in)
- Electrification: 1,500 V DC Overhead catenary
- Operating speed: 120 km/h (75 mph) (Maximum design speed)

Line Z4 of Tianjin Metro is a metro line in Tianjin, China. Line Z4 is the largest metro PPP project in China, valued at 55.3 billion RMB. It was won by Tianjin TEDA Investment Holdings Co., Ltd and China Railway Electrification Bureau Group Co., Ltd.

On 16 January 2026, Line Z4 opened trial ride activity for the public.

The northern section was officially put into operation on 18 January 2026.

== Timeline ==
Segment	Commencement	Length	Station(s)	Name
Zhaishang — Beitang	18 January 2026	23.738 km (14.75 mi)	10	North section

== Stations ==
Station name		Transfer	Distance km	Location
Pinyin	Chinese	Transfer	Distance km	Location
Zhaishang	寨上			Binhai New Area
Hanguyiyuan	汉沽医院			Binhai New Area
Zhongxinyugang	中心渔港			Binhai New Area
Yushadao	玉砂道			Binhai New Area
Hangmugongyuan	航母公园			Binhai New Area
Ruanjianyuan	软件园			Binhai New Area
Luchangyuan	绿创园			Binhai New Area
Heshunlu	和顺路			Binhai New Area
Zhongxinshengtaicheng	中新生态城			Binhai New Area
Beitang	北塘			Binhai New Area
