= Beijing South railway station =

High-speed railway station in Beijing

Beijingnan 北京南
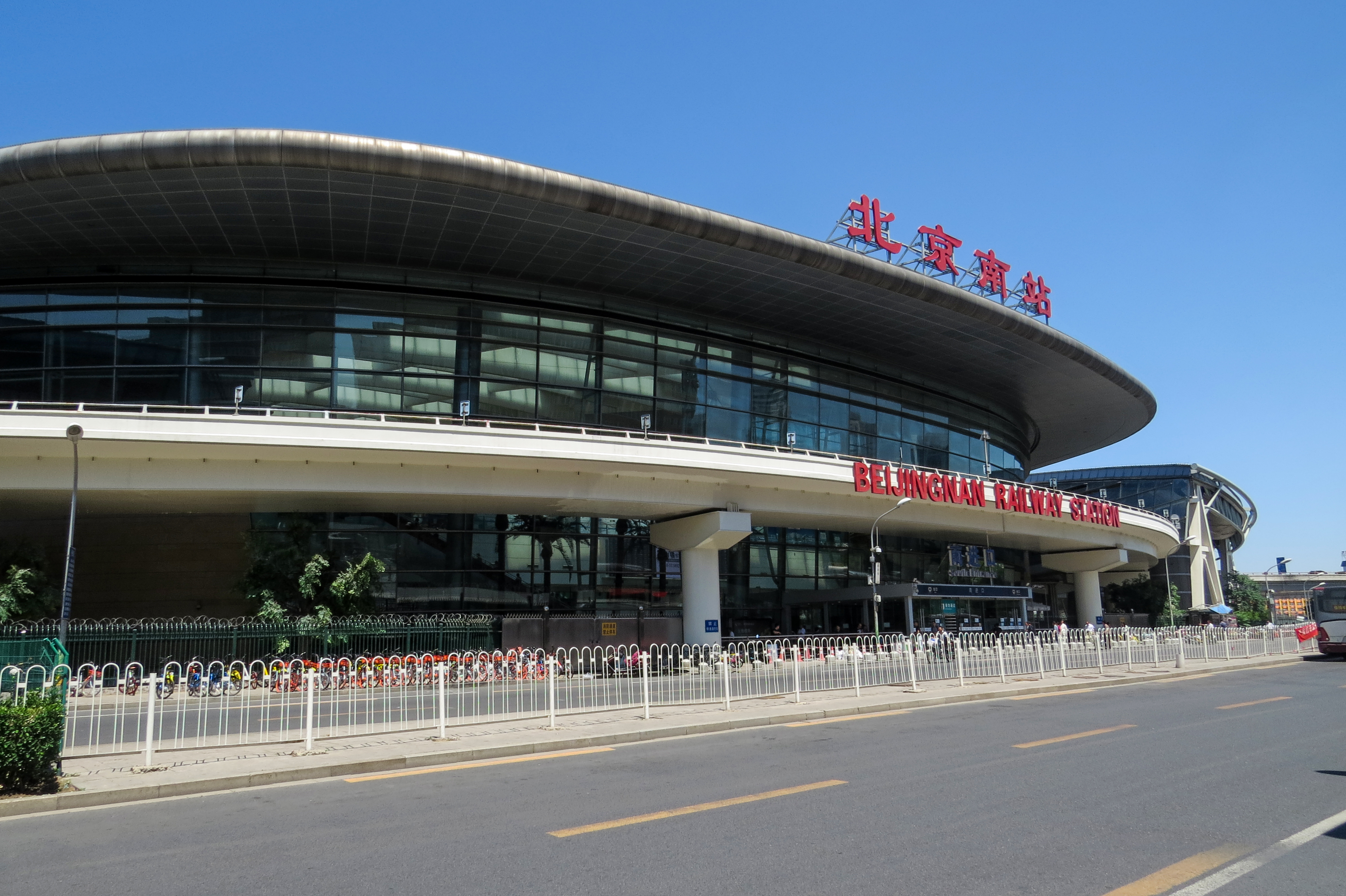
- Southern façade of Beijing South railway station in May 2017

General information
- Other names: Beijing South
- Location: Yongdingmen Chezhan Lu, Fengtai District, Beijing; China
- Coordinates: 39°51′57″N 116°22′35″E
- Operator: CR Beijing; Beijing Subway
- Connections: Bus terminal

History
- Opened: 1 August 2008; 28 September 2009
- Former names: Majiapu railway station, Yongdingmen railway station
Location
- Location within Beijing

Beijingnan (Beijing South) railway station (Chinese: 北京南站; pinyin: Běijīngnán Zhàn) is a large railway station in Fengtai District, Beijing, about 7.5 km (4.7 mi) south of central Beijing, between the 2nd and 3rd ring roads. The station in its present form opened on 1 August 2008 and mainly serves high speed trains.

The current station replaced the old Beijing South station, originally known as Majiapu railway station and later renamed Yongdingmen railway station, which stood 500 meters (1,600 ft) away. This station was in use from 1897 to 2006.

The new Beijing South railway station is the city's largest station, and is one of the largest in Asia. It joins the main Beijing railway station and the Beijing West railway station as one of three main passenger rail hubs in the Chinese capital. It serves as the terminus for high-speed trains on the Beijing–Tianjin intercity railway and Beijing–Shanghai high-speed Railway which can reach speeds up to 350 km/h (217 mph). CRH night sleepers to and from Shanghai also depart from this station.

The station integrates two Beijing Subway line stations, bus hubs (including an airport shuttle bus), and taxi stands, into the same building, and includes a wide variety of restaurants in the station itself.

== Design and construction ==
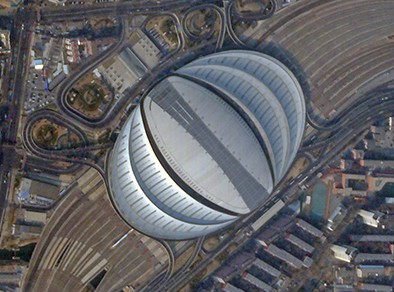
Satellite picture of the Beijing South Railway Station in 2017

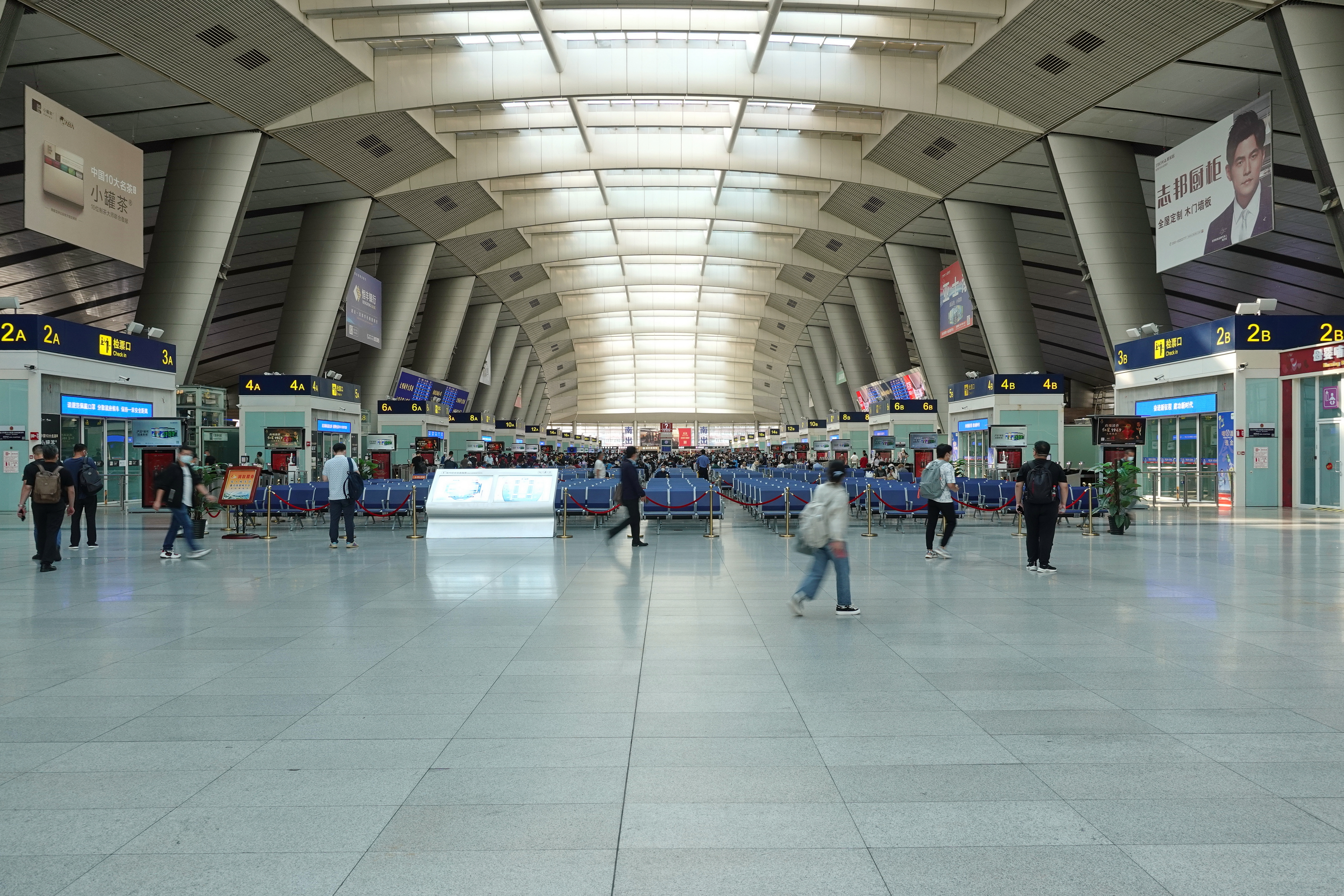
Beijing South Railway Station

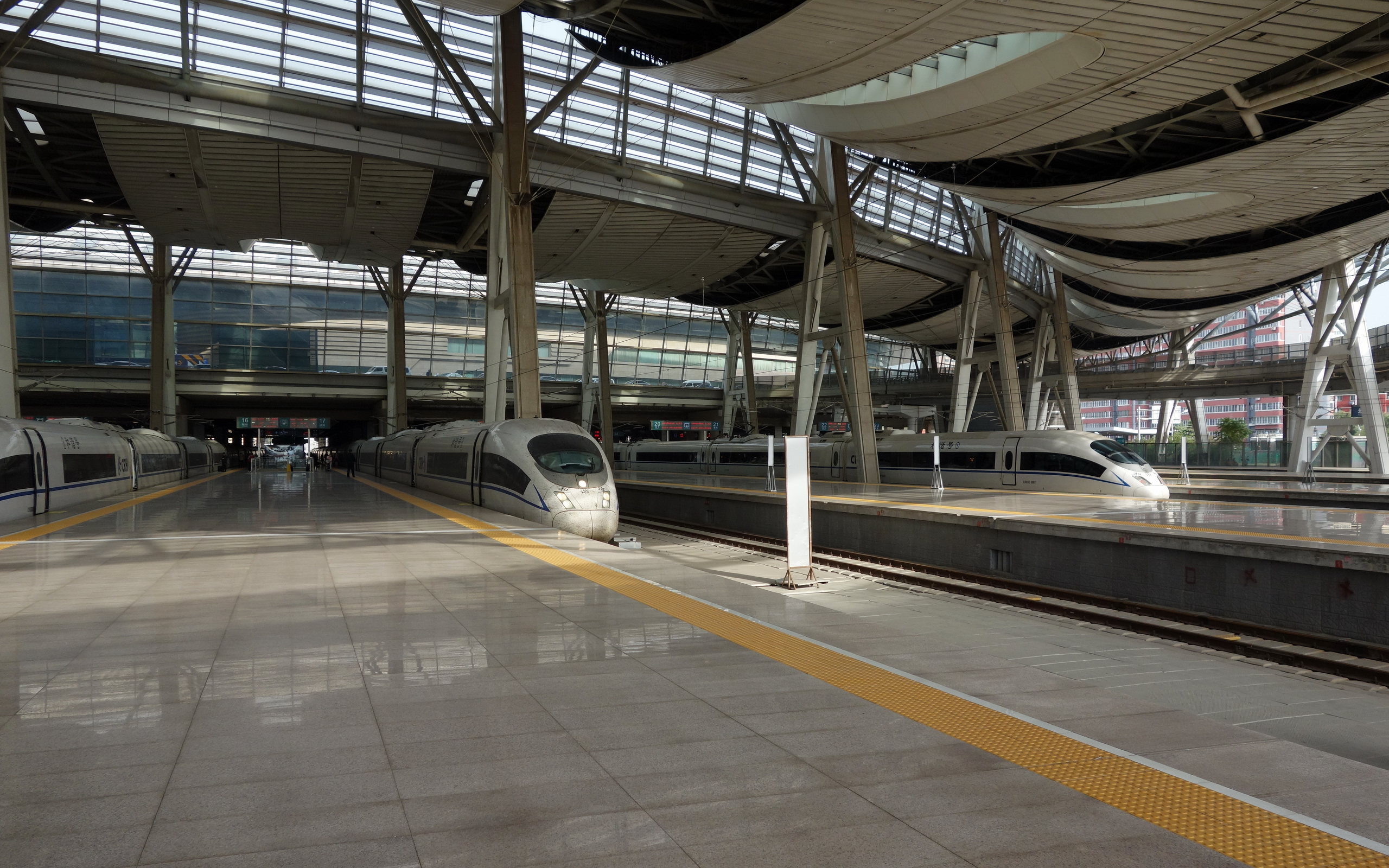
Beijing South Railway Station Platform

The terminus occupies a 32-hectare (79-acre) site in Fengtai.

The enormous oval-shaped station was designed by the British architecture firm of TFP Farrells in collaboration with the Tianjin Design Institute. It was built from more than 60,000 tons of steel and 490,000 cubic metres (17,304,000 cu ft) of concrete by 4,000 workers in less than three years. The glass ceiling is outfitted with 3,246 solar panels to generate electricity. The structure spreads out like a ray or trilobite and covers 320,000 square metres (3,444,000 sq ft), more than the Beijing National Stadium's 258,000 square metres (2,777,000 sq ft). Its 24 platforms have the capacity to dispatch 30,000 passengers per hour or almost 241 million a year. The 251,000-square-metre (2,702,000 sq ft) waiting area can accommodate 10,000 passengers.

On the elevated departures concourse, there are designated waiting areas and VIP lounges (with better seating and, in the lounges, free food and snacks) for passengers travelling in CRH Business Class, and a number of restaurants and corner shops. There are also a number of ticket counters (where nationwide ticketing services are available) and an increasing number of retail stores and fast food stalls. Ticket machines are available to holders of the PRC ID card and sell tickets for trains departing from this station. 23 sets of ticket gates despatch passengers onto trains.

The arrivals level is underground, with 8 arrival gates situated in the immediate vicinity of the Beijing Subway station concourse. To the sides are two taxi stands, and separated West and East parking lots for private cars (including a mezzanine level). Express entrances have been built, and are presently in use for all C trains to Tianjin, as well as some trains to Shanghai. Ticket machines and a few ticket counters are also available at the arrivals level. As with the departures level, a variety of restaurants and corner shops are also available at the arrivals level. Two floors below the arrivals level are the platforms for Lines 4 and 14, respectively.

Reconstruction began on 10 May 2006, immediately after services ended at the old station. The station was complete for the 1 August 2008 reopening. In 2011 and 2012, new restaurants, fast food stalls, and corner shops were added. To cut queues, traditional counters at the arrival level were replaced with ticket machines.

== Local transportation ==
As of 2019, public transportation is accessible within the station itself. There is no need to go through security check again if transferring between trains and subway. The Beijing Subway's Beijing South Station subway stop has Line 4 and Line 14 service. The Beijing Bus has three stops at the station. The Beijing Airport Bus provides service to the Beijing Capital International Airport. After 11:30pm, the only public transport option is night buses (夜)17. A taxi line is available inside the station.

== Services ==
=== China Railway ===
Beijingnan 北京南

General information
- Other names: Beijing South
- Location: Yongdingmen Chezhan Lu, Fengtai District, Beijing; China
- Operator: Beijing Railway Bureau; China Railway Corporation
- Lines: Beijing–Shanghai High-Speed Railway; Beijing–Tianjin Intercity Railway; Beijing–Shanghai Railway
- Platforms: 24 (11 island platforms, 2 side platforms)

Other information
- Station code: TMIS code: 10010; Telegram code: VNP; Pinyin code: BJN
- Classification: Top Class station

History
- Opened: 1897 (original); 2008 (current)
- Closed: 2006 (original)
- Former names: Majiapu, Yongdingmen
Services
| Preceding station | China Railway High-speed | Following station |
|---|---|---|
| Terminus | Beijing–Tianjin intercity railway | Yizhuang towards Binhai |
| Terminus | Beijing–Shanghai high-speed railway Part of the Beijing–Fuzhou high-speed railway | Langfang towards Shanghai Hongqiao |
| Preceding station | China Railway | Following station |
| Beijing Terminus | Beijing–Shanghai railway | Beijing Fengtai towards Shanghai |
Location

Beijing South Station is the terminal for two China Railway High-speed (CRH) railway lines. The Beijing–Tianjin Intercity Railway has frequent service to Tianjin. The Beijing–Shanghai High-Speed Railway runs trains to Jinan, Nanjing, and Shanghai, with several trains continuing to Hangzhou and Ningbo. This railway also has services to Qingdao (via the Jiao'ao–Jinan branch), Hefei (via the Bengbu–Hefei branch) and Fuzhou (via the Hefei–Fuzhou High-Speed Railway). There is also a service to Northeast China. In July 2013, travel time to Hangzhou was cut by one hour for direct services that skip Shanghai.

=== Beijing Subway ===
Beijingnan Zhan (Beijing South Railway Station) 北京南站
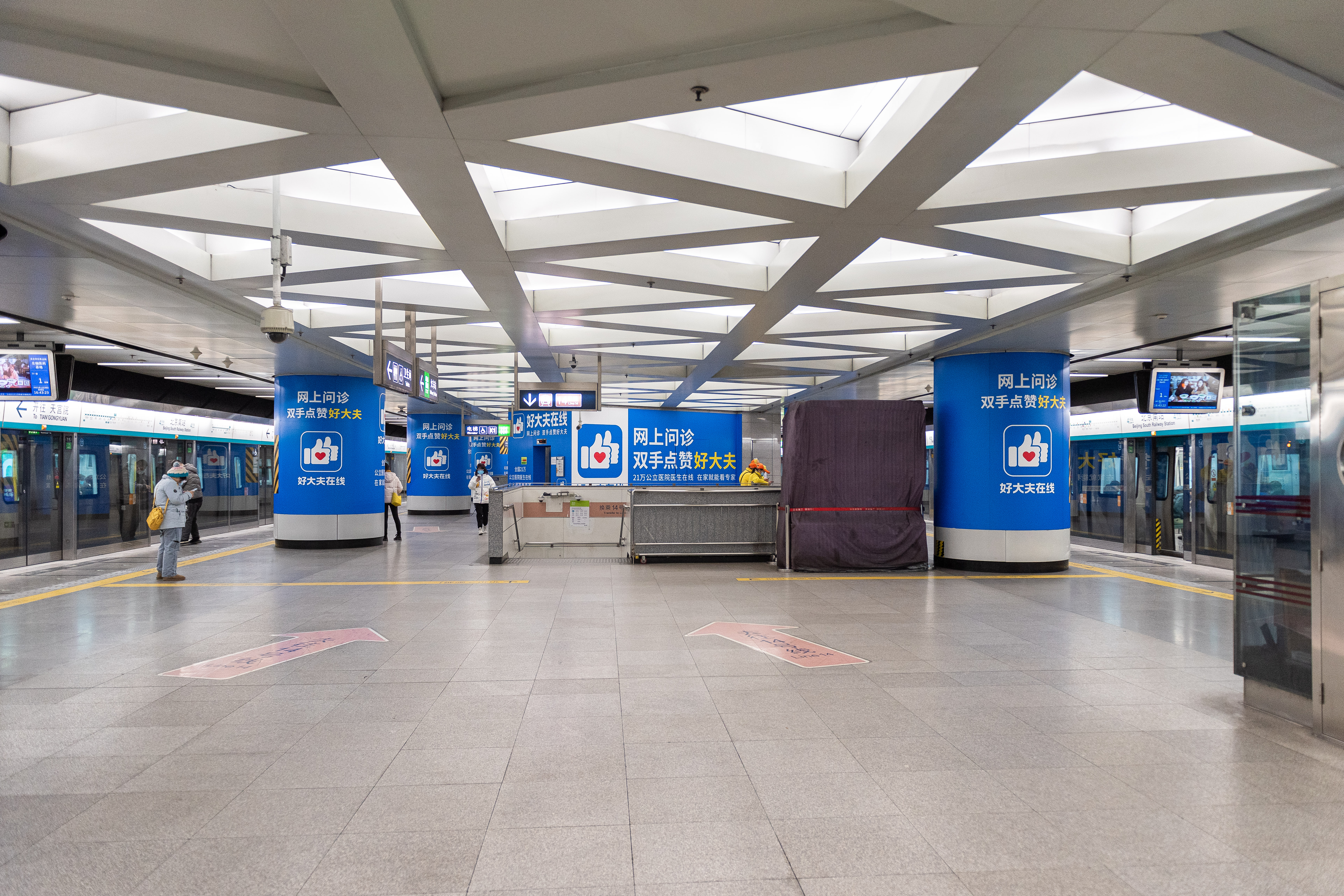
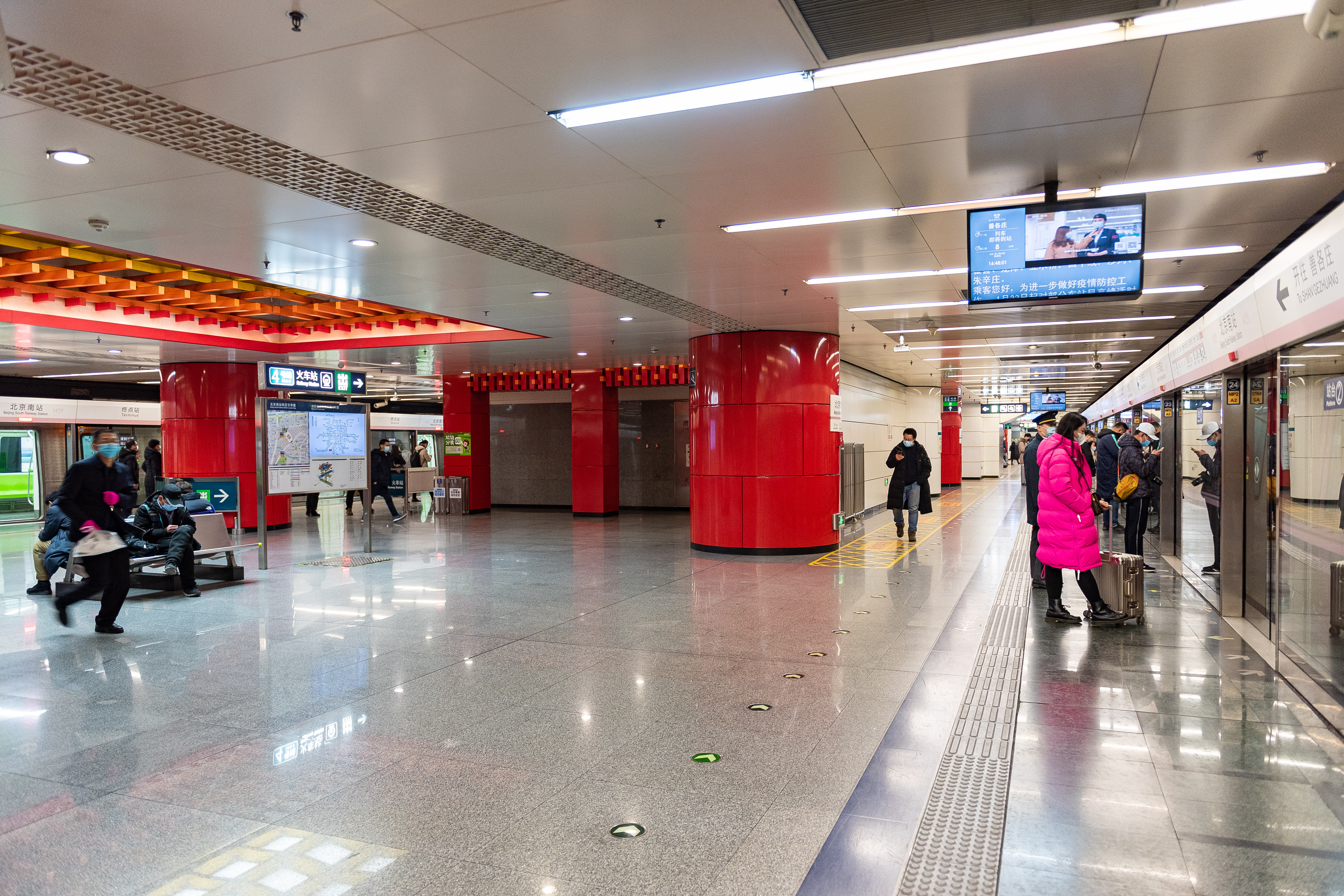
- Line 4 platform Line 14 platform

General information
- Location: Fengtai District, Beijing; China
- Operator: Beijing MTR Corporation Limited
- Lines: Line 4; Line 14
- Platforms: 4 (2 island platforms)
- Tracks: 4

Construction
- Structure type: Underground
- Accessible: Yes

History
- Opened: 28 September 2009; 16 years ago (Line 4); 26 December 2015; 10 years ago (Line 14)

Services
| Preceding station | Beijing Subway | Following station |
|---|---|---|
| Taoranting towards Anheqiaobei | Line 4 | Majiapu towards Tiangong Yuan |
| Jingfengmen towards Zhangguozhuang | Line 14 | Yongdingmenwai towards Shangezhuang |
Location

Beijingnan Zhan (Beijing South railway station) is a subway station on Line 4 and Line 14 of the Beijing Subway in China. It is located under the building of Beijing South railway station. The station opened on 28 September 2009, when the whole Line 4 was put in operation. The station on average has 135,000 entrances and exits per day.

Beijing South railway station is an underground station with one platform and two side tracks. Line 4 runs at the station in the direction north–south, and Line 14 runs west–east.

==== Station layout ====
The line 4 and line 14 stations both have underground island platforms.

== Gallery ==
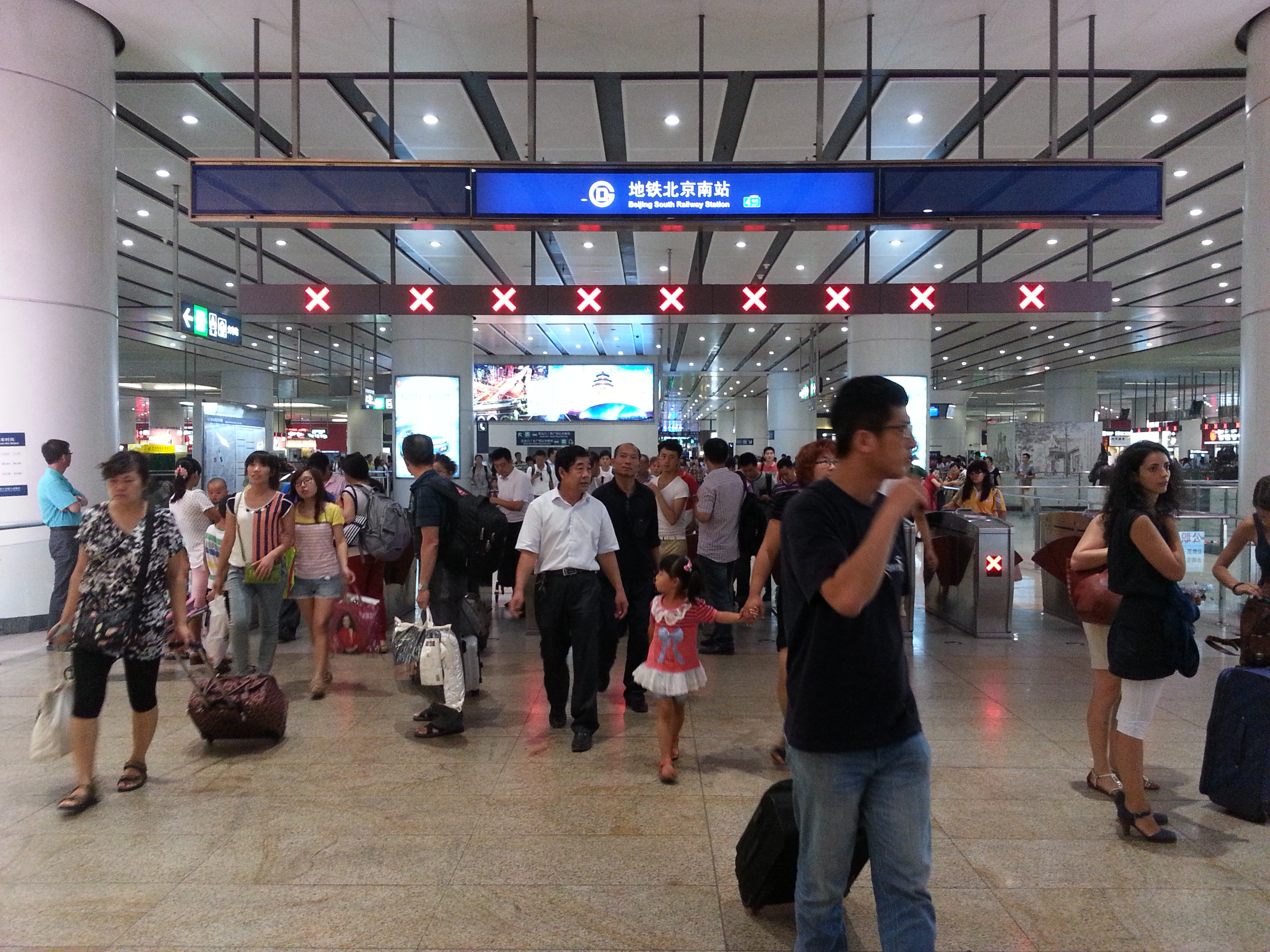
South entrance to subway station (September 2013)

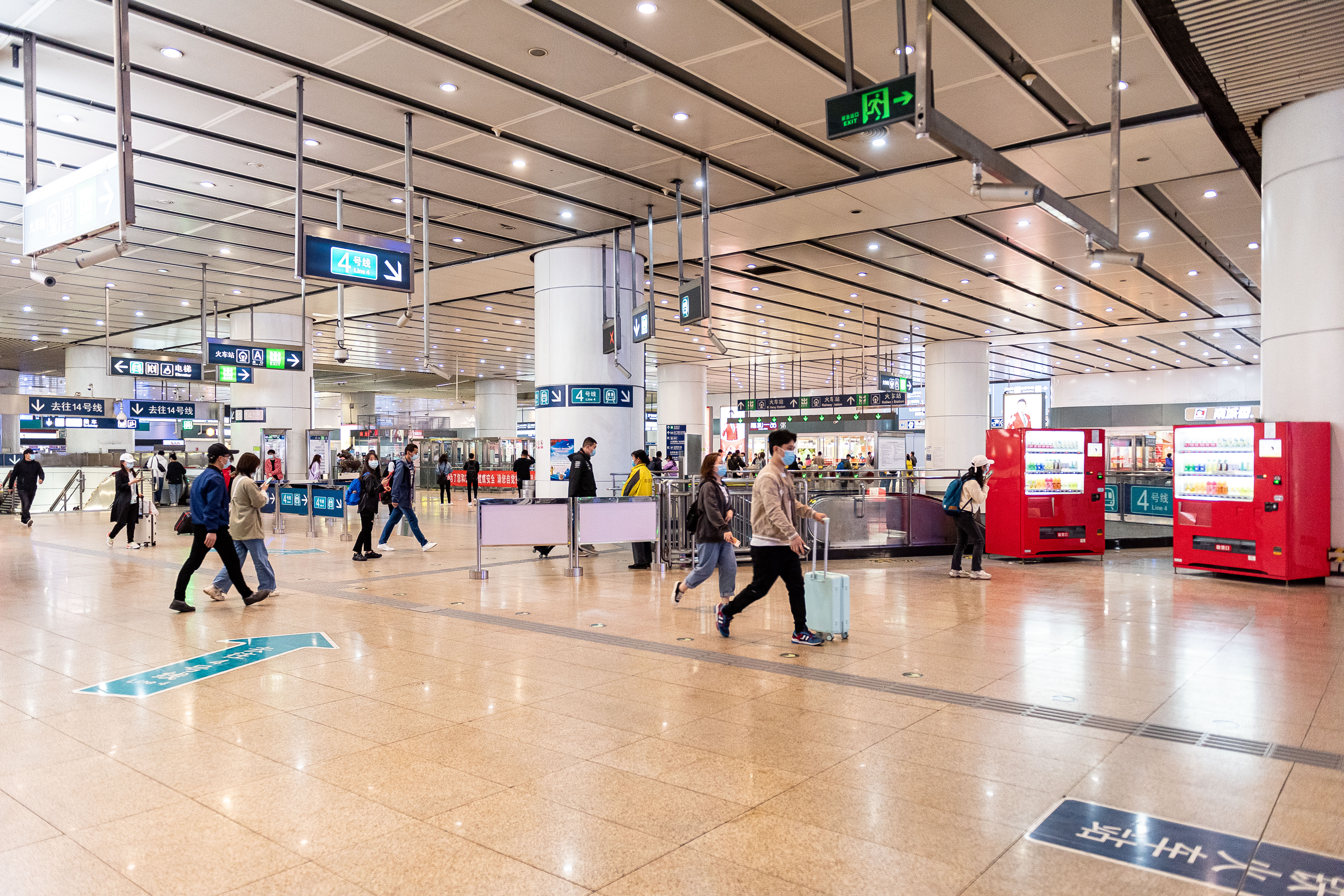
Concourse (May 2021)
