= China Railway NYJ1 =

Chinese diesel multiple unit

NYJ1 diesel multiple unit
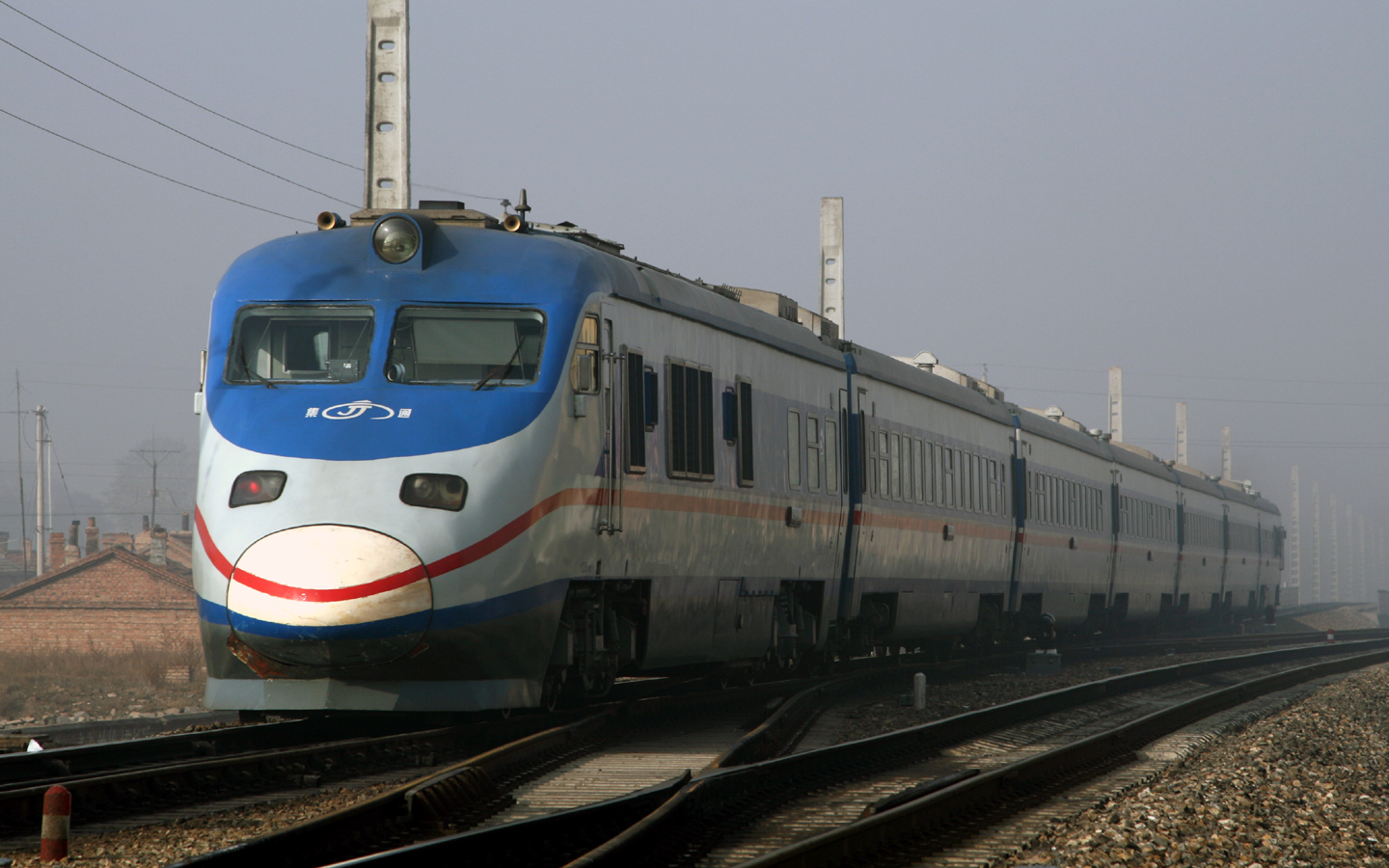
- "Hanlu" DMU of Jitong Railway Company
- In service: 2000–2010
- Manufacturers: CRRC Qingdao Sifang; CRRC Changchun Railway Vehicles
- Number built: 16 sets
- Formation: 2M4T–2M8T
- Operators: China Ministry of Railways (China); Shenhua Group

Specifications
- Train length: 22.500 m (73.82 ft) (power car)
- Width: 3.204 m (10.51 ft)
- Height: 4.050 m (13.29 ft)
- Maximum speed: 120 to 140 km/h (75 to 87 mph) (operational)
- Axle load: Power car: 21 t (46,000 lb); Trailer car: 17 t (37,000 lb)
- Prime mover: Two Caterpillar 3508B diesel engines
- Power output: 2 × 1,000 kW (1,300 hp) (engine)
- Tractive effort: 2,000 kW (2,700 hp) (total traction)
- Transmission: Hydraulic
- Bogies: CW-160K (power car), SW-160 (trailer car)
- Braking system: Type 104 electro-pneumatic braking
- Track gauge: 1,435 mm (4 ft 8 1/2 in) standard gauge

The NYJ1 is one of the DMU models of China Railway, adopting a power-concentrated configuration. It was designed and manufactured by CRRC Sifang and CRRC Changchun Railway Vehicles.

== Development history ==
Starting in the late 1990s, to increase train operating speeds and meet the needs of short-distance intercity travel, China began developing diesel multiple units. According to the development plan of the Ministry of Railways' Science and Technology Department, CRRC Tangshan developed the NZJ "Lushan" double-deck diesel multiple unit, while CRRC Sifang also developed the NYJ1 diesel multiple unit to compete.

=== China Railway Nanchang Group ===
The first NYJ1 DMU passed the Ministry of Railways' technical design review on April 12, 1998, and trial production was completed in December 1998. In February 1999, it was allocated to the China Railway Nanchang Group and began operation between Nanchang and Jingdezhen on February 14, named "Jiujiang". The second NYJ1 DMU began operation between Nanchang and Yushan in March 1999. The two trainsets were numbered NYJ1-4001 and NYJ1-4002. Due to the NYJ1 DMU's relatively more reliable performance compared to Tangshan's NZJ DMU in actual operation, the NYJ1 DMU gained favour with other railway bureaus, though its overall reliability was still considered insufficient.

In August 2012, the Nanchang Railway Group published a tender announcement on the China Railway Procurement Network for the sale of four power cars from two decommissioned NYJ1 diesel multiple units.

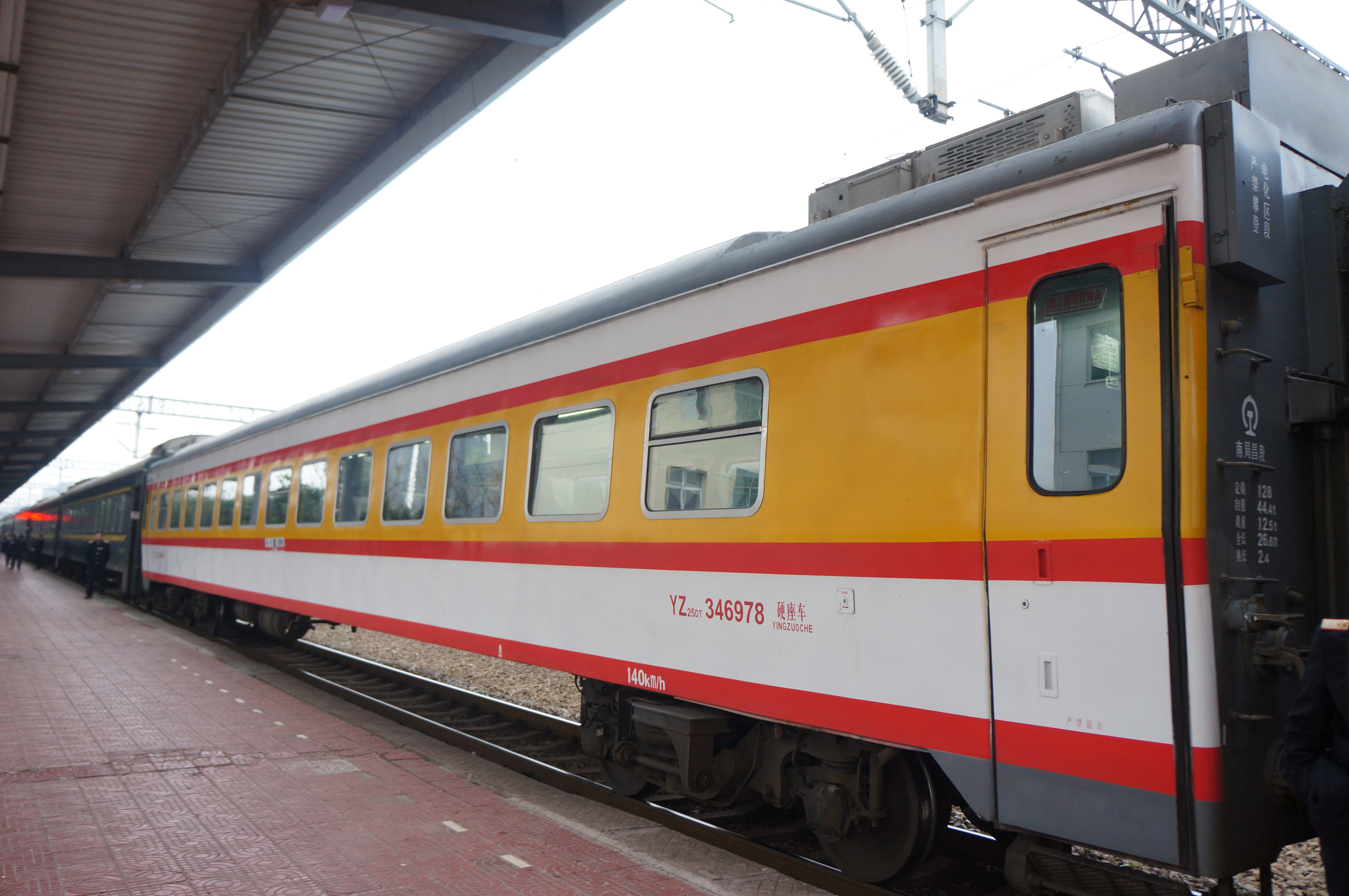
Decommissioned "Jiujiang Hao" carriage parked at Jinxian railway station.

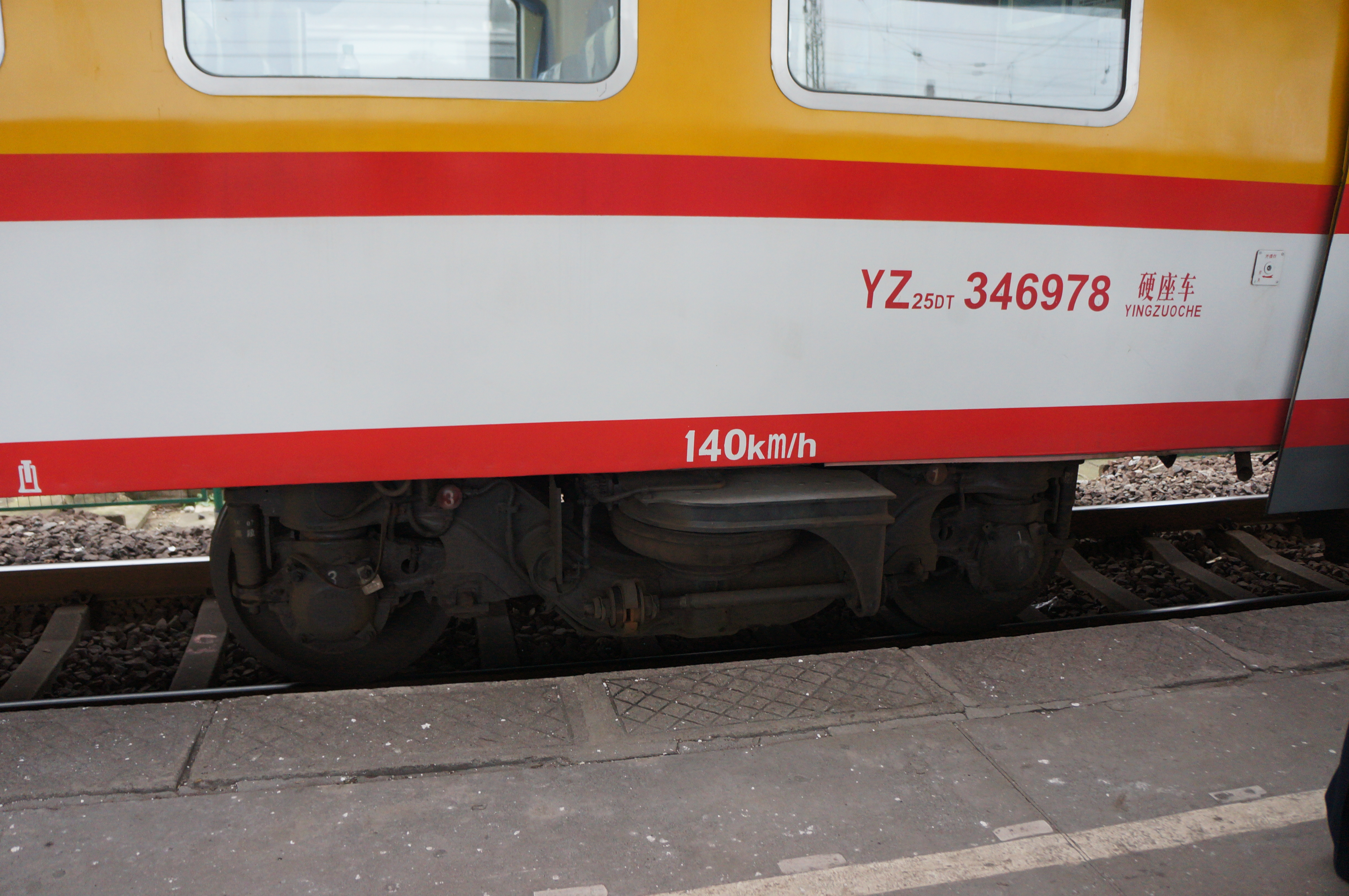
Bogie of "Jiujiang Hao" train.

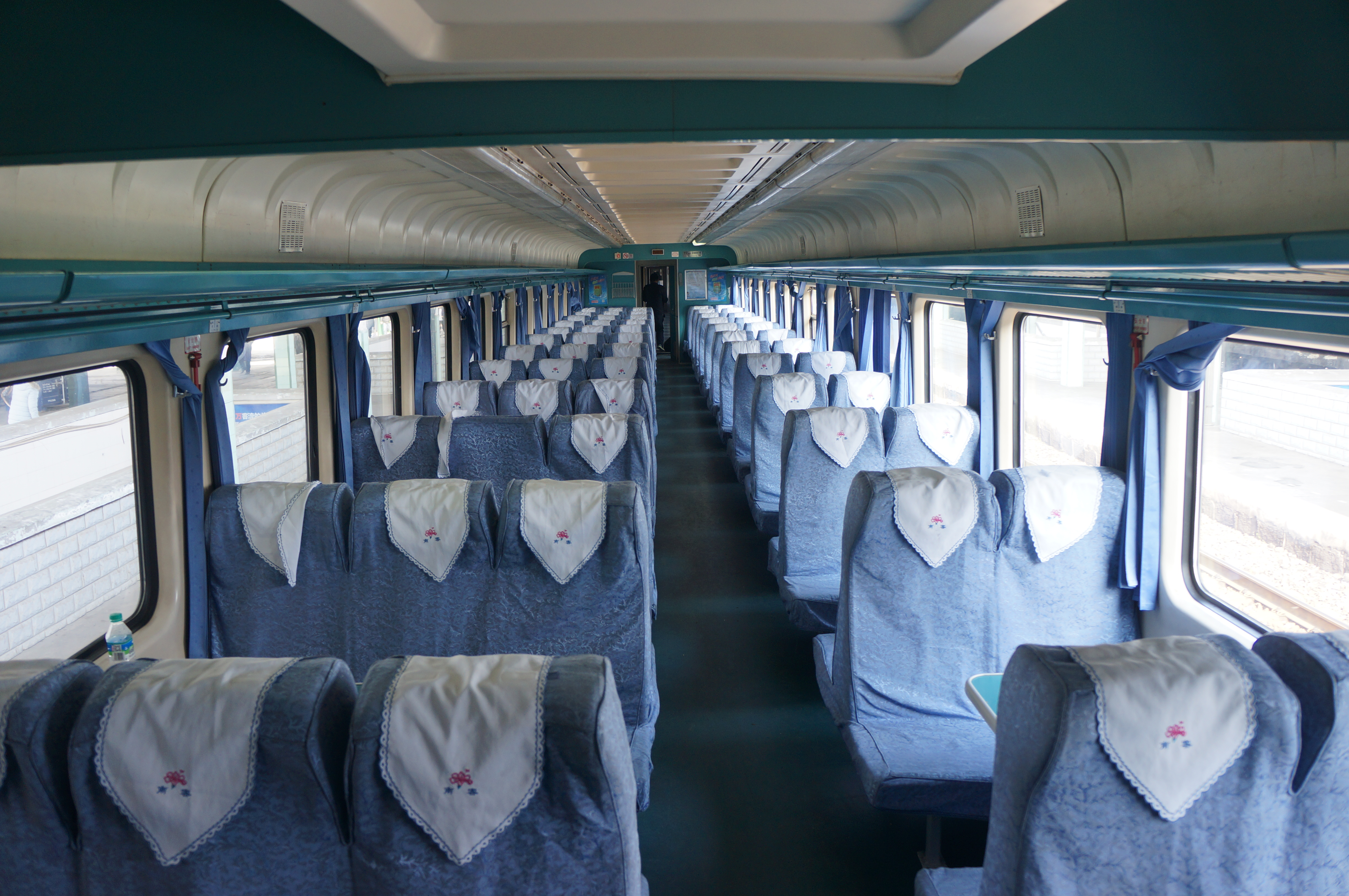
Interior of "Jiujiang Hao" train.

=== China Railway Harbin Group ===
In the autumn of 1999, the China Railway Harbin Group also ordered 4 sets, numbered NYJ1-4003 to NYJ1-4006, named "Beiya" (North Asia). The first two sets were produced by CRRC Sifang, featuring a blue and white livery, while the other two were manufactured by CRRC Changchun Railway Vehicles, with a red and silver livery. To adapt to the severe winter climate in Northeast China, the train design underwent cold-weather modifications. In late 1999, the Beiya Hao trains began operating between Harbin and Qiqihar, Mudanjiang, Jiamusi, and Suifenhe, with train numbers D81 to D88 at the time. In October 2004, the Harbin Railway Group heavily promoted new passenger products – direct express trains between Harbin and Mudanjiang, and Harbin and Jiamusi. The Beiya Hao completed the 355 km (221 mi) journey from Harbin to Mudanjiang in 3 hours and 58 minutes, or the 507 km (315 mi) journey from Harbin to Jiamusi in 4 hours and 58 minutes, achieving an average speed of 102 km/h (63 mph). The power cars of the four Beiya Hao trainsets ceased operation in 2011, and the remaining carriages were converted for regular passenger service.

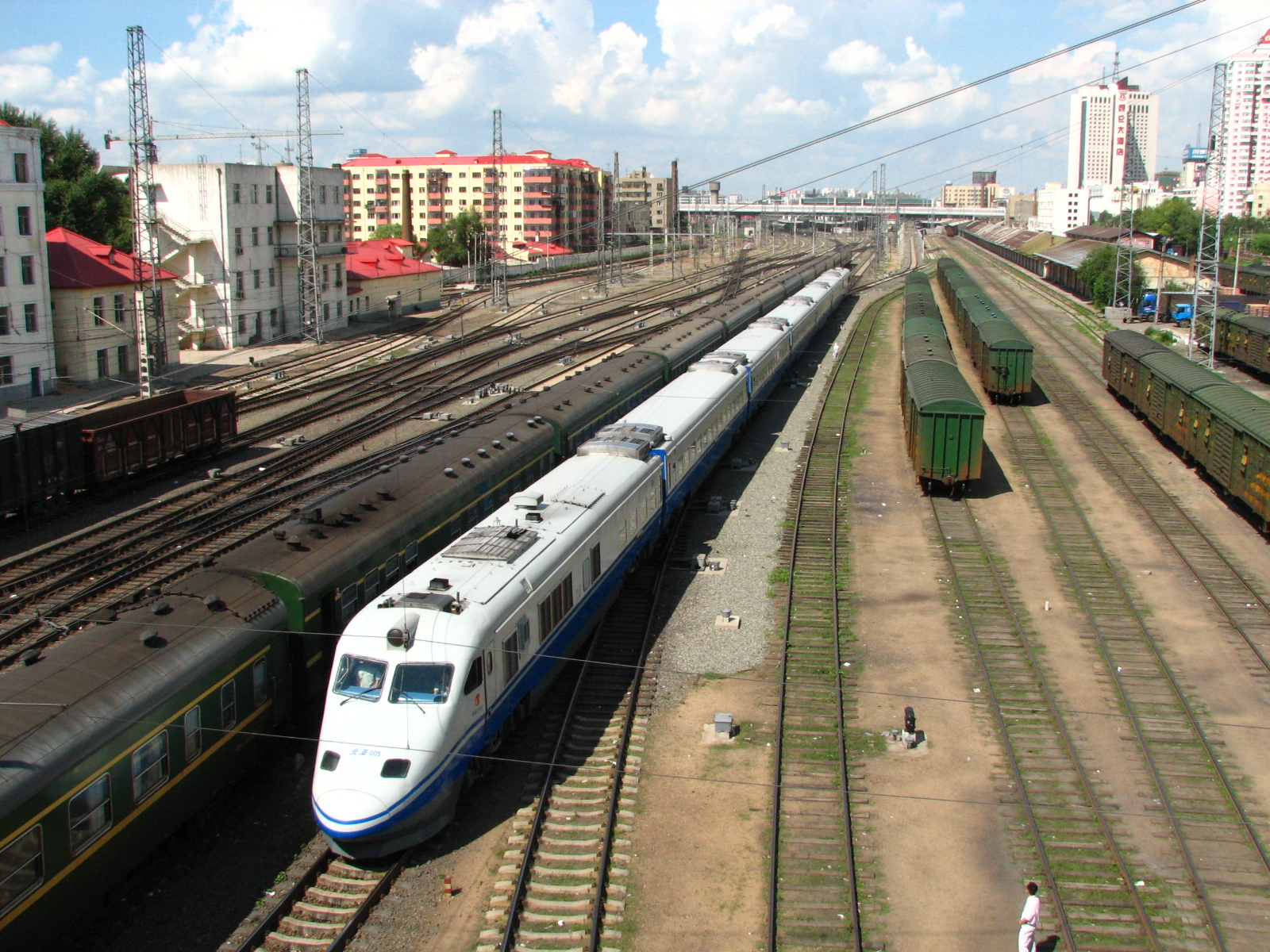
"Beiya" NYJ1-4005 train parked near Harbin railway station, 2006.

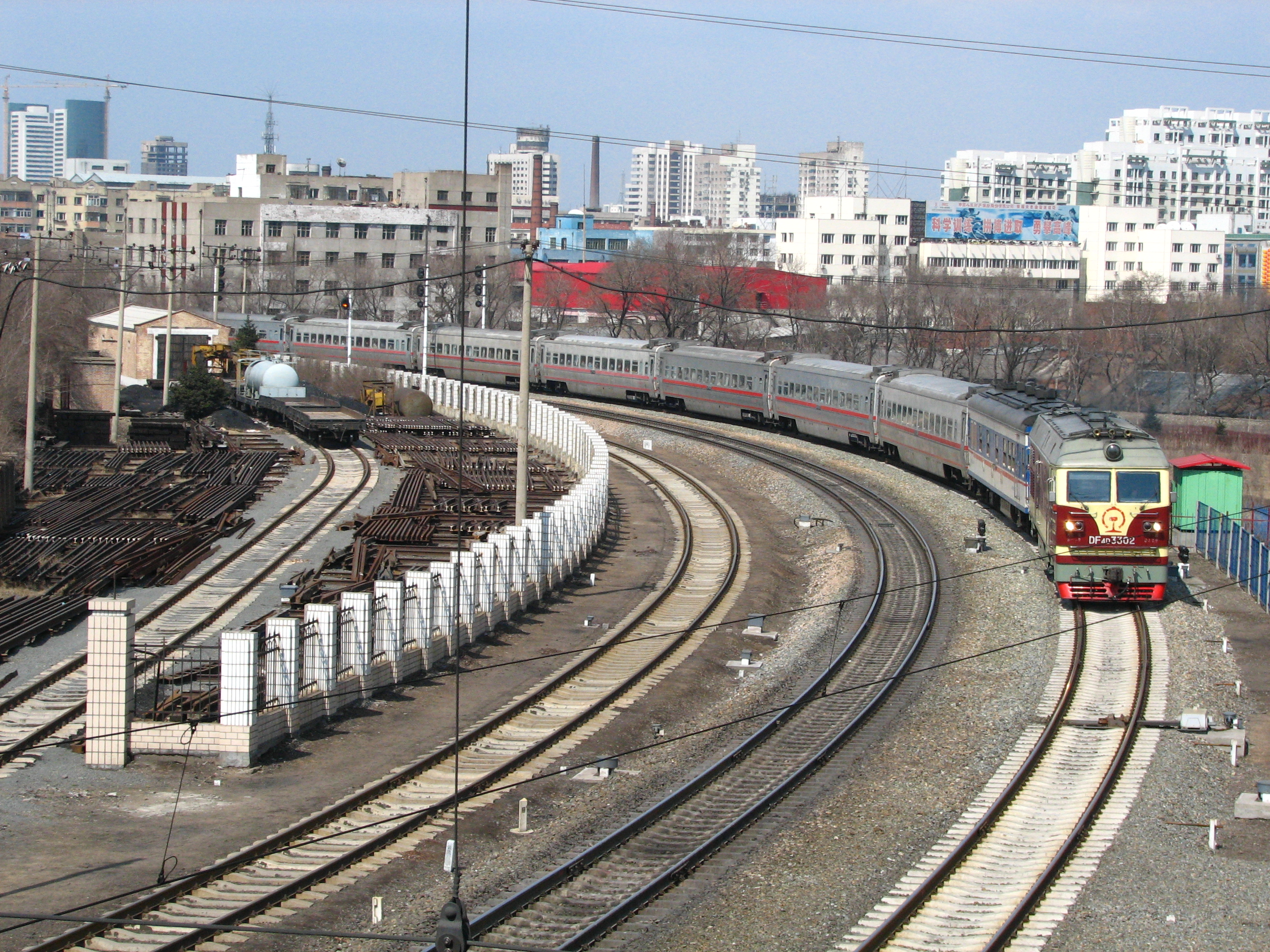
NYJ DMU carriage integrated into a regular train, 2007.

=== Inner Mongolia Jitong Railway ===
In 2000, Inner Mongolia Jitong Railway Company ordered one set for operation on the Jitong Railway, numbered NYJ1-4010. Later, two more sets were purchased, numbered NYJ1-4013 to NYJ1-4014.

On July 1, 2000, the 998 tourist DMU service from Daban to Hohhot on the Jitong Railway began. In 2001, Jitong Railway's Aodu Travel Agency partnered with Balin Right Banner Yilin Hanlu (Mineral Water) Co., Ltd., naming the DMU "Hanlu Hao". On August 1, 2002, with the opening of the Xisang Railway (Xilinhot—Sangendalai, a branch of the Jitong Railway), the "Hanlu Hao" DMU was reassigned to operate the 998 passenger train from Xilinhot to Hohhot on the Xisang line. On September 10, 2003, the Jitong Railway launched the K502 DMU service from Tongliao to Hohhot. On August 16, 2007, the "Grassland Women's Express" DMU, inscribed by Uyunqimg, Vice Chairperson of the Standing Committee of the National People's Congress, was officially unveiled at Hohhot railway station. In 2009, Jitong Railway replaced the NYJ1 DMU with 25G rolling stock.

=== China Railway Taiyuan Group ===
The Taiyuan Railway Sub-bureau and Linfen Railway Sub-bureau of the China Railway Beijing Group each ordered one set, numbered NYJ1-4008 to NYJ1-4009, named "Jinlong Hao". They began operation between Taiyuan, Linfen, and Yuncheng on August 1, 2001. In May 2006, after 6 years of operation and over 1.4 million kilometers, the Jinlong Hao returned to CRRC Qingdao Sifang for a major overhaul. The two Jinlong Hao sets operated passenger trains between Taiyuan and Yuncheng/Yongji, and ceased operation in 2010. Their power cars were scrapped, and the remaining carriages were converted for regular passenger service.

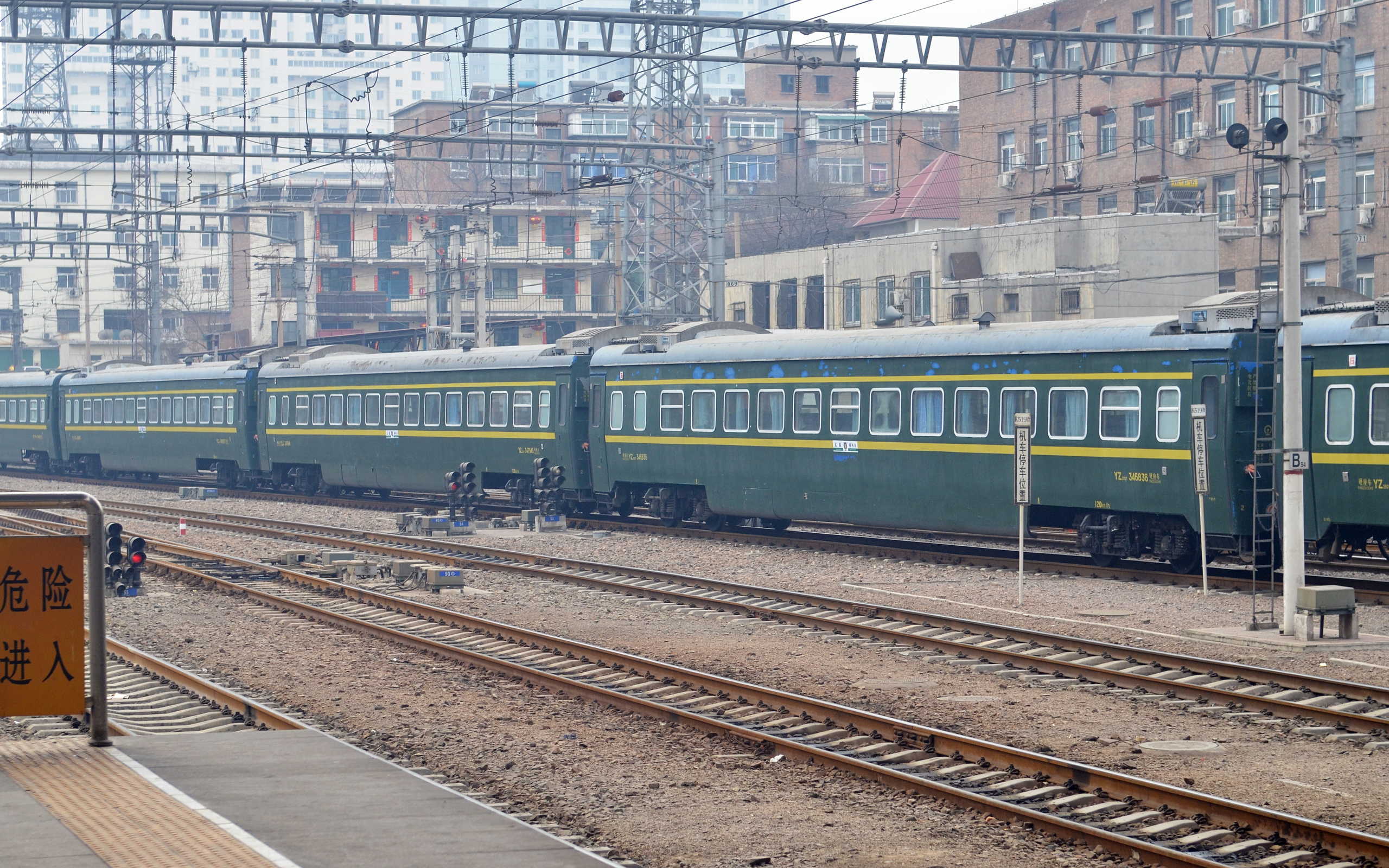
After the "Jinlong Hao" of Taiyuan Railway Group ceased operation, its power cars were scrapped, and the remaining 25DT carriages were converted for regular passenger service.

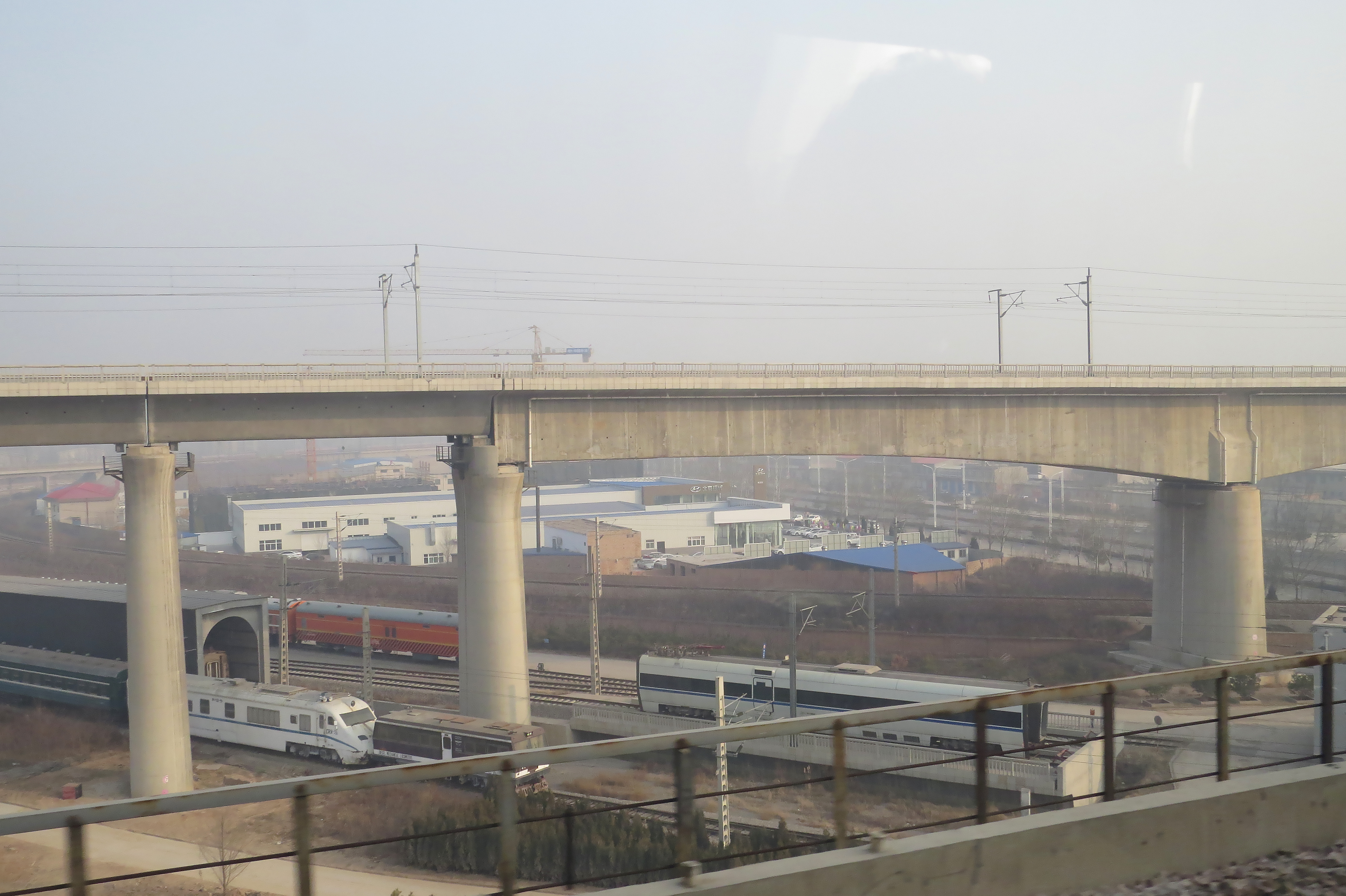
One of the power cars of the "Jinlong Hao" DMU is currently sealed and stored at Taiyuan Railway Group's Mingli Rescue Base.

=== Guangxi Coastal Railway Company ===
The Guangxi Coastal Railway Company ordered one set, numbered NYJ1-4011, named "Beihai", which operated between Nanning and Beihai. The train numbers were K9320/K9319. On June 10, 2012, the Beihai operated for the last time. Subsequently, it was replaced by a train consisting of 25K rolling stock hauled by a DF4DF diesel locomotive, with the train numbers remaining unchanged.

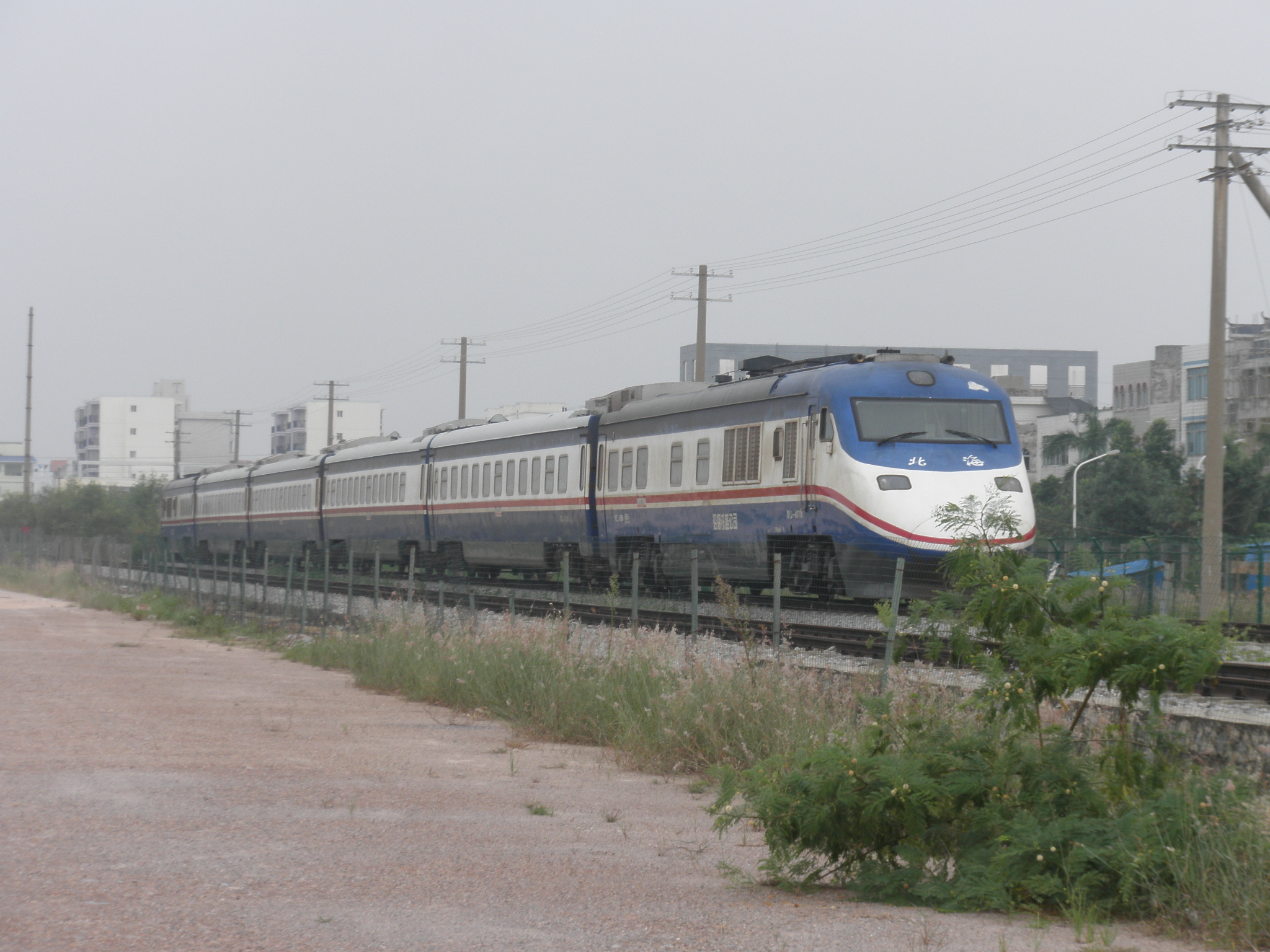
"Beihai" currently sealed and stored at Beihai Passenger Technical Station.

=== Shenhua Group ===
Shenhua Group's Baoshen Railway ordered one set in 2000, which was delivered in July 2001 and began operating passenger train 4695/6 between Shenmubei and Baotou in August 2002. Later, it operated train 7497/8 between Shenmubei, Dongsheng, and Wanshuiquan South. As the original manufacturer could no longer provide maintenance for the train, for safety reasons, Shenhua Group decided to suspend the 7497/8 diesel multiple unit passenger train service from July 24, 2014.

== Technical characteristics ==
The NYJ1 DMU is a hydraulic transmission single-deck diesel multiple unit. The power cars at both ends of the trainset have the same structure, with trailer cars in between. The standard formation is two power cars and four trailer cars (Mc+4T+Mc), but the formation can be adjusted according to user needs. If expanded to five or more trailer cars, the train's maximum speed will decrease. The power car features a streamlined front end, a low-height drum-shaped body cross-section, and uses electrically controlled pneumatic automatic plug doors, sealed tempered glass windows, fully sealed folding gangways, and integrated fiberglass toilets and restrooms.

Inside the power car, from front to back, are the driver's cab, power compartment, cooling compartment, auxiliary power generation compartment, power distribution compartment, and passenger compartment. The power compartment houses a Caterpillar 3508B diesel engine with an installed power of 1,000 kW (1,300 hp). The cooling compartment contains the transmission system, which uses the same SF2010 hydraulic transmission box as the DFH3 diesel locomotive. Above it are the cooling device, a 33 kW (44 hp) starting auxiliary generator, and a 22 kW (30 hp) electric air pump unit. The auxiliary power generation compartment contains a 200 kW (270 hp) auxiliary diesel generator set, used to supply power to the train's air conditioning units, electric heaters, electric tea boilers, and lighting. The power distribution compartment contains the auxiliary generator control panel, air conditioning control panel, charging device, smoke and fire alarm controller, fire extinguishers, axle temperature alarm device, and plug door centralized control device. The rear of the power car is a passenger compartment with 38 seats.

The two power cars at the front and rear use microcomputer-based electrical multiple unit control. Their control systems are identical and interlocked. The trailing car's control system receives operating commands from the leading car via the train communication network, simultaneously controlling the entire DMU. Monitoring information from the trailing car can be displayed on the leading car's driver's console, allowing the driver in the leading car to control all operational aspects of both power cars. The train control and communication network system is centered around a Silicon Laboratories C8051F040 microcontroller. The train communication network is divided into 2 levels according to the TCN standard: Level 1 is the wired train bus (WTB), which enables data communication between vehicles; Level 2 is the Multifunction Vehicle Bus (MVB), primarily for data communication between various functional control units within the same vehicle.

== See also ==
- China Railway NZJ diesel multiple unit
- China Railway NZJ1 diesel multiple unit
- China Railway NZJ2 diesel multiple unit
- China Railway NDJ3 diesel multiple unit
- Putian DMU diesel multiple unit
- China Railway Tianchi diesel multiple unit
- China Railway TSD09 diesel multiple unit
- China Railway DF11 diesel locomotive
