= China Railway NZJ1 =

NZJ1 Xin Shuguang
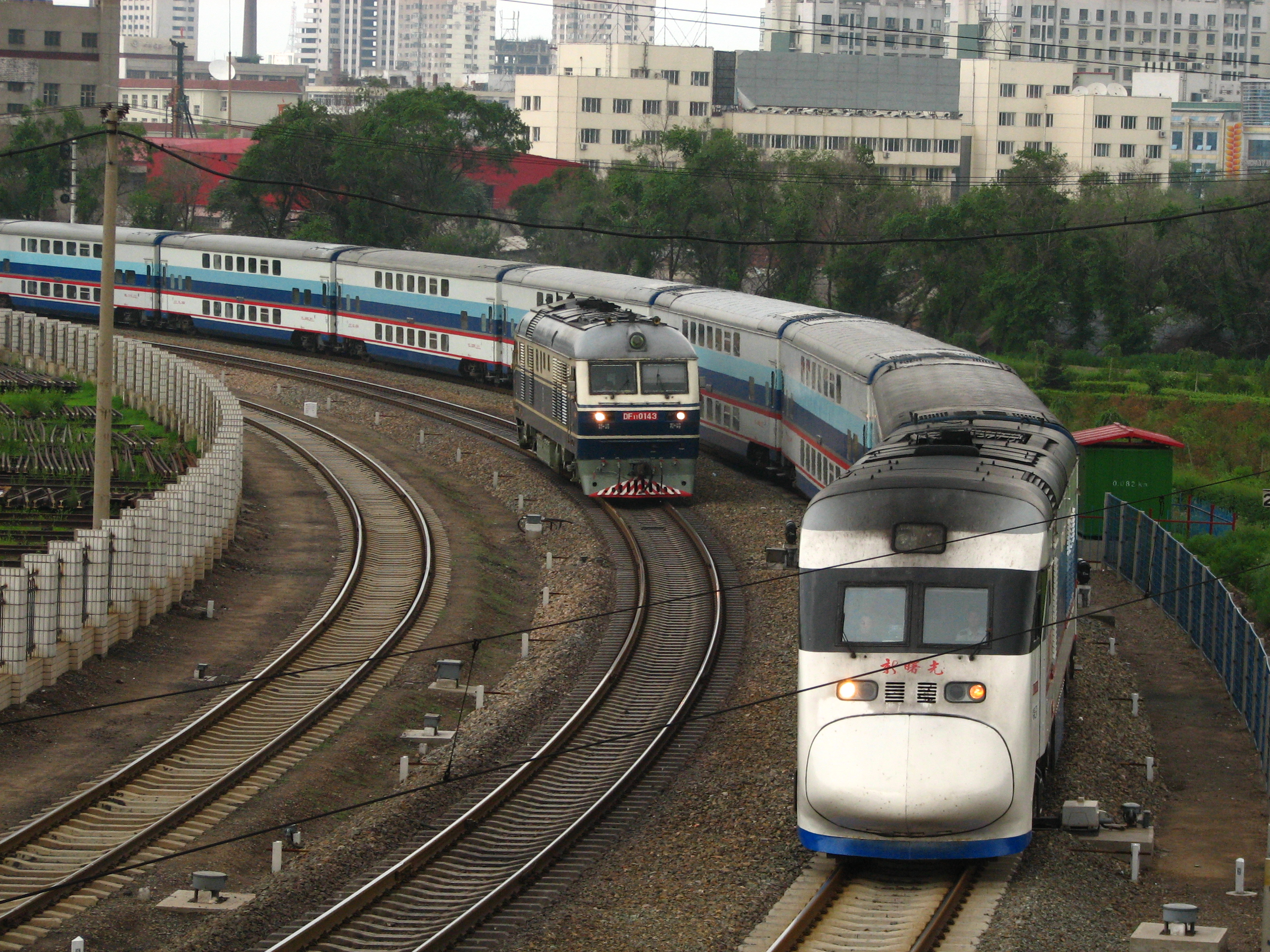
- NZJ1 "Xin Shuguang" DMU in Harbin
- In service: 10 October 1999 – 1 November 2010
- Manufacturers: CRRC Qishuyan; CRRC Nanjing Puzhen
- Number built: 1 set
- Formation: 2M9T
- Capacity: 1140
- Operator: ~~Ministry of Railways (China)~~

Specifications
- Train length: 281 m (922 ft); Power car: 20.600 m (67.59 ft); Intermediate car: 25.500 m (83.66 ft)
- Width: 3.104 m (10.18 ft)
- Height: 4.736 m (15.54 ft)
- Maximum speed: Service: 180 km/h (110 mph); Design: 180 km/h (110 mph); Record: 199.4 km/h (120 mph)
- Weight: 702 t (1,548,000 lb)
- Axle load: Power car: 21 t (46,000 lb); Trailer car: ≤16 t (35,000 lb)
- Prime mover: 12V280ZJ
- Power output: 2 × 2,760 kW (3,700 hp) (engine)
- Tractive effort: 2 × 1,980 kW (2,660 hp) (total traction)
- Transmission: AC-DC electric
- Braking systems: Rheostatic braking, air braking
- Track gauge: 1,435 mm (4 ft 8 1/2 in) standard gauge

The NZJ1 "Xin Shuguang" (New Dawn) is one of the higher-speed DMU models of China Railway. It is a push-pull, double-deck trainset with a "two power cars and nine trailer cars" power-concentrated configuration. It was jointly developed by CRRC Qishuyan, CRRC Nanjing Puzhen, and China Railway Shanghai Group and successfully completed in 1999. The train's maximum operational speed is 180 km/h (110 mph). The "Xin Shuguang" entered service on October 10, 1999, operating on the Shanghai–Hangzhou Railway and Shanghai–Nanjing Railway. In April 2007, it was reallocated to the China Railway Harbin Group, and it ceased operation at the end of 2010. Due to its distinctive front-end shape and livery, the "Xin Shuguang" was also jokingly nicknamed "Silkworm".

== Development history ==
=== Background ===
Since the mid-1990s, China's railway passenger transport faced challenges from highways, leading to a significant decline in railway passenger volume, especially for short-distance intercity travel. To enhance the competitiveness of railway passenger transport, the Ministry of Railways (China) gradually adopted railway speed-up as an important development strategy. On April 1, 1997, China implemented its first large-scale railway speed-up, marking the beginning of the Campaign to raise the speed of railway travel in China. To compete with highways for the medium- and short-distance passenger transport market and meet the demand for increased speeds in medium- and short-distance railway passenger transport, the Ministry of Railways officially approved the project to develop a "180 km/h quasi-high-speed diesel multiple unit" in July 1998, listing it as one of the key scientific research projects for 1998.

=== Development ===
The "two power cars and nine trailer cars" quasi-high-speed diesel multiple unit was jointly developed by CRRC Qishuyan, CRRC Nanjing Puzhen, and China Railway Shanghai Group. The train consisted of 2 power cars and 9 bilevel passenger trailer cars. The power cars were developed by Qishuyan Works, and the trailer cars by Puzhen Works. To ensure reliability, the train largely adopted mature technologies from the China Railway DF11, DF8B, and 25K rolling stock bilevel passenger cars.

By the end of 1998, Qishuyan Works and Nanjing Puzhen Works had completed the design proposals for the power cars and trailer cars, respectively. In January 1999, the DMU's technical design passed the Ministry of Railways' technical review. On April 4, 1999, Qishuyan Works and Puzhen Works completed the construction design of the train and began the trial production phase. In July 1999, the 12V280ZJ diesel engine developed for the power cars passed the UIC 100-hour test at Qishuyan Works. On August 17, 1999, two power cars were completed at Qishuyan Works. At the same time, with the approval of the Ministry of Railways, the train was officially designated as NZJ1 type, where "N" stands for diesel multiple unit, "Z" for DC motor, "J" for power-concentrated, and "1" for the first model, and was named "Xin Shuguang" (New Dawn).

=== Testing ===
By the end of August 1999, Puzhen Works had completed the 9 trailer cars. The power cars from Qishuyan Works were sent to Nanjing to complete the formation with the trailer cars, and preliminary tests such as small-radius curve passing performance, train power supply, and braking system were conducted within Puzhen Works. In early September 1999, the "Xin Shuguang" train was sent to the Beijing National Railway Test Centre of the China Academy of Railway Sciences for safety assessment and comprehensive performance tests. On September 14, the "Xin Shuguang" train arrived in Shanghai, and subsequently underwent a week-long dynamic track test on the Shanghai–Nanjing Railway and Shanghai–Hangzhou Railway. During this period, the maximum test speed reached 199.4 km/h (123.9 mph). Then-Vice Minister of Railways Liu Zhijun and others also participated in the entire test of the "Xin Shuguang". On September 23, the "Xin Shuguang" train passed the safety assessment by the Ministry of Railways expert group, which approved its operation at a maximum speed of 180 km/h (110 mph).

=== Operation ===
On October 10, 1999, the "Xin Shuguang" train officially began its 300,000 km operational assessment. The Shanghai Railway Administration launched express trains KC1, KC2, and KC6, operating between Shanghai, Nanjing, and Hangzhou. Train KC2 departed from Shanghai railway station at 8:00 AM daily, stopping at Suzhou railway station, and arrived at Nanjing West railway station at 10:48 AM, with a journey time of only 2 hours and 48 minutes. Train KC1 departed from Nanjing West at 11:41 AM, stopping at Changzhou railway station and Shanghai, and arrived at Hangzhou railway station at 4:39 PM. Train KC6 returned from Hangzhou at 5:48 PM, arriving back in Shanghai at 7:48 PM. Its ticket price was the same as the "Xianxing Hao" express trains (K2/3/5/8). One month after its operation, the "Xin Shuguang" train's passenger volume exceeded 700,000. By the end of the same year, the T5/6 express train, originally operated by China Railways 25Z rolling stock between Shanghai and Wuxi railway station, was also taken over by the "Xin Shuguang" and renumbered as KC7/8.

On October 21, 2000, China Railway implemented its third major speed-up, which reclassified and adjusted Train numbers nationwide. "Express passenger trains" were divided into "T"-prefixed "Special Express Passenger Trains" and "K"-prefixed "Express Passenger Trains". KC1/6/2 trains were adjusted to T721/722 Special Express trains, with the operating section adjusted to Shanghai to Nanjing West. KC7/8's operating section remained unchanged, and its number was changed to T717/718 Special Express trains. On November 1, 2000, the "Xin Shuguang" train completed its 300,000 km assessment. The two power cars were sent back to Qishuyan Works for disassembly and inspection of their main components, including diesel engines, bogies, traction motors, and generators, with no major defects found. The "Xin Shuguang" train passed the Ministry of Railways' scientific and technological achievement appraisal in 2001.

On April 18, 2004, China Railway implemented its fourth major speed-up, and the Shanghai-Nanjing intercity train schedule was also adjusted. T721/722 trains were changed to T723/724, still operating between Shanghai and Nanjing West, while T717/718 trains remained unchanged. On December 8, 2004, the Shanghai Railway Administration made another significant adjustment to the Shanghai-Nanjing intercity train schedule. The "Xin Shuguang" train was reassigned to operate T707/708 and T717/718 between Shanghai and Nanjing. The train returned to the factory for overhaul on August 22, 2006, and T707/708 trains were suspended, while T717/718 trains were replaced by 25T type passenger cars (BSP). On September 29, 2006, the "Xin Shuguang" train re-entered service, operating N559/560 local express trains from Shanghai South to Yiwu, and N891/892, N893/894 local express trains from Shanghai South to Jiaxing, replacing the original China Railways 25G rolling stock (Xiaoyong Company). March 31, 2007, was the last day of operation for the "Xin Shuguang" train under the Shanghai Railway Administration. After its suspension, the train was reallocated to the China Railway Harbin Group in early April of the same year.

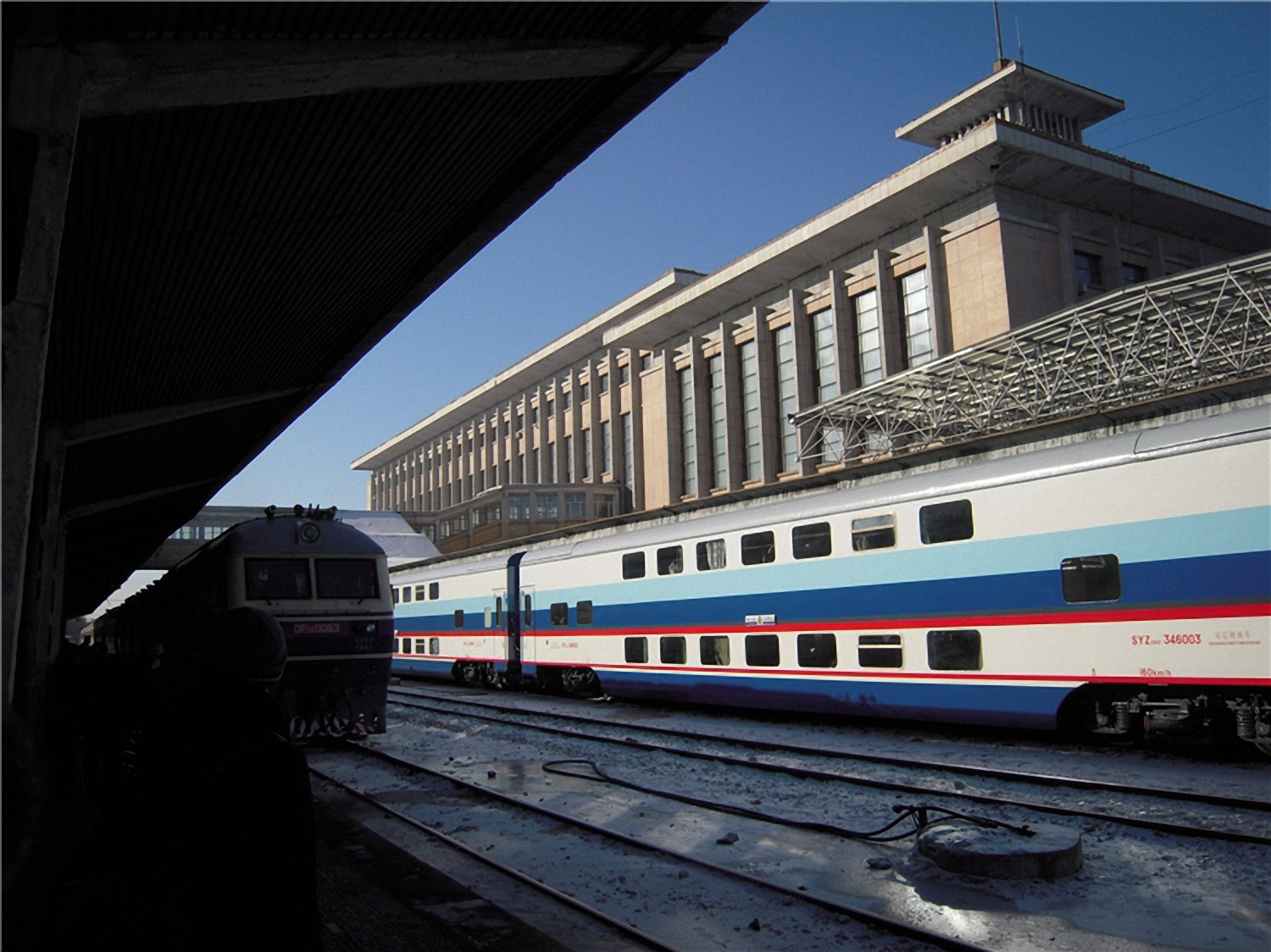
NZJ1 "Xin Shuguang" at Qiqihar railway station.

On April 18, 2007, China Railway implemented its sixth major speed-up. The Harbin Railway Group used the "Xin Shuguang" train to operate T501/T504/505/508 express trains between Harbin, Daqing, and Qiqihar (changed to T5001/5004/5005/5008 from April 1, 2009), operating on the Harbin–Manzhouli Railway. The total journey time was 2 hours and 28 minutes. In November 2010, the "Xin Shuguang" train ceased operation, and its power cars and trailer cars were sealed and stored separately at Yimianpo Locomotive Depot and Harbin Rolling Stock Depot.

== Technical characteristics ==
=== Overall structure ===
The NZJ1 diesel multiple unit is a power-concentrated push-pull trainset, adopting an 11-car formation of "two power cars and nine trailer cars", consisting of 2 power cars and 9 double-deck passenger trailer cars. The power cars are located at the front and rear of the train, pulling and pushing the train. The train formation can also be appropriately increased or decreased according to actual operational needs, operating as "two power cars and eight trailer cars" or "two power cars and ten trailer cars". Each power car is a six-axle diesel locomotive, featuring a single-end driver's cab and an internal corridor, side-bearing fully welded steel body structure. From front to back, it consists of the driver's cab, electrical compartment, power compartment, cooling compartment, and auxiliary compartment. It adopts a streamlined front end to reduce air resistance during high-speed operation. The electrical compartment houses high and low voltage electrical cabinets, microcomputer control cabinets, main silicon rectifier cabinets, traction motor blowers, etc., with a rheostatic brake cabinet on the roof. The power compartment is equipped with a diesel generator set, as well as excitation rectifier cabinets, air filters, fuel transfer pumps, fuel filters, expansion water tanks, and other auxiliary equipment. The cooling compartment contains oil-water system cooling devices, hydrostatic transmissions, traction motor blowers, and air compressors. Fuel tanks, main air reservoirs, and battery sets are installed between the two bogies under the car body. To reduce axle load and the interaction force between wheels and rails, the power car adopts an A1A-A1A axle arrangement, meaning the middle axle of each bogie is not equipped with a traction motor.

The intermediate trailer cars are 25DT type double-deck passenger cars. The "two power cars and nine trailer cars" formation includes 3 double-deck soft-seat cars and 6 double-deck hard-seat cars, whose structure is basically the same as the 25K type double-deck passenger cars. The steel structure of the car body is a fish-belly shaped integral load-bearing all-steel welded frameless tubular structure. The soft-seat cars adopt a "2+2" seating arrangement, and the hard-seat cars adopt a "3+2" seating arrangement. The cars feature enclosed upper and lower staircases, electrically controlled pneumatic plug doors, and vacuum retention toilets. The carriages are connected by tightlock couplers and sealed gangways manufactured by Narita Seisakusho of Japan.

=== Power system ===
Each power car is equipped with one 12V280ZJ diesel engine, belonging to the 280/285 series diesel engines. It is a derivative product based on the 16V280ZJA diesel engine used in DF11 locomotives, with a reduced number of cylinders. This type of diesel engine is a 12-cylinder, four-stroke, exhaust gas turbocharged direct-injection V-type medium-speed diesel engine, with a cylinder diameter of 280 mm (11 in) and a piston stroke of 285 mm (11.2 in). Its rated power is 2,900 kW (3,900 hp), and its installed operational power is 2,760 kW (3,700 hp).

The main transmission system is an AC/DC electric transmission. The diesel engine directly drives a synchronous main traction generator to produce three-phase electric power, which is then rectified into direct current by a main silicon rectifier to supply power to 4 parallel DC traction motors. The power car uses a JF211 type synchronous main and auxiliary generator, which also provides train power supply. The main generator is used for traction, while the auxiliary generator's output, after rectification, supplies 600 V DC power to the passenger cars. Its output power is 2×400 kW (540 hp). Through inverters installed in each car, the 600 V DC power is inverted into two 380V AC power sources, which can provide power for air conditioning, electric heating, electric tea boilers, and lighting equipment. The traction motors are ZD106A type DC traction motors, which are improved versions of the ZD106 type traction motors used in DF11 type locomotives, with power increased from 530 kW (710 hp) to 600 kW (800 hp). The power car is also equipped with a rheostatic brake device, with a braking power of 2×2,100 kW (2,800 hp).

=== Control system ===
The microcomputer control system of the "Xin Shuguang" diesel multiple unit is an improvement based on the microcomputer systems of the DF11 and DF8B type locomotives, with added "LonWorks" network communication function to achieve multiple-unit control of the leading and trailing power cars. The microcomputer control system uses an Intel 16-bit 80C186 microprocessor, and has functions such as train traction and braking control, constant power excitation, anti-slip and anti-skid control, and multiple-unit communication control. The "LonWorks" network system is used for real-time transmission of multiple-unit control commands and monitoring data between the leading and trailing power cars, and the train bus is a shielded twisted pair cable.

=== Bogies ===
The power car's running gear consists of two A1A three-axle bogies, improved from the quasi-high-speed bogies of the DF11 type locomotive. The fixed wheelbase has been shortened from 2,000 mm (79 in) on the DF11 type locomotive to 1,900 mm (75 in). The bogies adopt a fully welded "H"-shaped frame structure. The primary suspension consists of axle box coil springs with hydraulic shock absorbers, and the secondary suspension uses a high-flexibility coil spring structure, equipped with vertical and lateral hydraulic shock absorbers and anti-hunting dampers. Tractive effort and braking force are transmitted through a low-position four-link traction device. The traction motors use the same double-sided six-link wheelset hollow shaft fully suspended drive device as the DF11 type locomotive.

The double-deck passenger cars use PW-200 type high-speed bogies designed and manufactured by Puzhen Works. The PW-200 type bogie is a newly developed version based on the 209HS type bogie, featuring an "H"-shaped welded frame, axle box rubber stack elastic positioning device, and a central suspension system with a bolster structure using elastic support air springs. The basic braking system is axle disc brakes, with three brake discs installed on each axle.

=== Train formation ===
Car No.			1	2	3	4	5	6	7	8	9	
Train formation	Shanghai Railway Group	Power Car	Double-deck Hard Seat Car			Double-deck Soft Seat Car			Double-deck Hard Seat Car			Power Car
Train formation	Harbin Railway Group	Power Car	Double-deck Soft Seat Car			Double-deck Hard Seat Car						Power Car
Car number	Shanghai Railway Group	NZJ1-7001A	SYZ_{25DT} 345999; SYZ_{25DT} 346000; SYZ_{25DT} 346001; SYZ_{25DT} 346002; SYZ_{25DT} 346003; SYZ_{25DT} 346004; SYZ_{25DT} 346005; SYZ_{25DT} 349604; Note: Car formation varies based on operational and maintenance needs.			SRZ_{25DT} 110887; SRZ_{25DT} 110888; SRZ_{25DT} 110889; SRZ_{25DT} 111115; Note: Car formation varies based on operational and maintenance needs.			SYZ_{25DT} 345999; SYZ_{25DT} 346000; SYZ_{25DT} 346001; SYZ_{25DT} 346002; SYZ_{25DT} 346003; SYZ_{25DT} 346004; SYZ_{25DT} 346005; SYZ_{25DT} 349604; Note: Car formation varies based on operational and maintenance needs.			NZJ1-7001B
Car number	Harbin Railway Group	NZJ1-7001A	SRZ_{25DT} 110887; SRZ_{25DT} 110888; SRZ_{25DT} 110889; SRZ_{25DT} 111115; Note: Car formation varies based on operational and maintenance needs.			SYZ_{25DT} 345999; SYZ_{25DT} 346000; SYZ_{25DT} 346001; SYZ_{25DT} 346002; SYZ_{25DT} 346003; SYZ_{25DT} 346004; SYZ_{25DT} 346005; SYZ_{25DT} 349604; Note: Car formation varies based on operational and maintenance needs.						NZJ1-7001B
Power distribution		●〇● ●〇●	〇〇 〇〇	〇〇 〇〇	〇〇 〇〇	〇〇 〇〇	〇〇 〇〇	〇〇 〇〇	〇〇 〇〇	〇〇 〇〇	〇〇 〇〇	●〇● ●〇●
Axle arrangement		A1A-A1A	2-2	2-2	2-2	2-2	2-2	2-2	2-2	2-2	2-2	A1A-A1A
Power configuration		Power car (Mc)	Trailer car (T)									Power car (Mc)

== See also ==
- China Railway NYJ1 diesel multiple unit
- China Railway NZJ2 diesel multiple unit
- China Railway NDJ3 diesel multiple unit
- China Railway Putian diesel multiple unit
- China Railway Tianchi diesel multiple unit
- China Railway TSD09 diesel multiple unit
- China Railway DF11 diesel locomotive
