= China Railway NDJ3 =

NDJ3
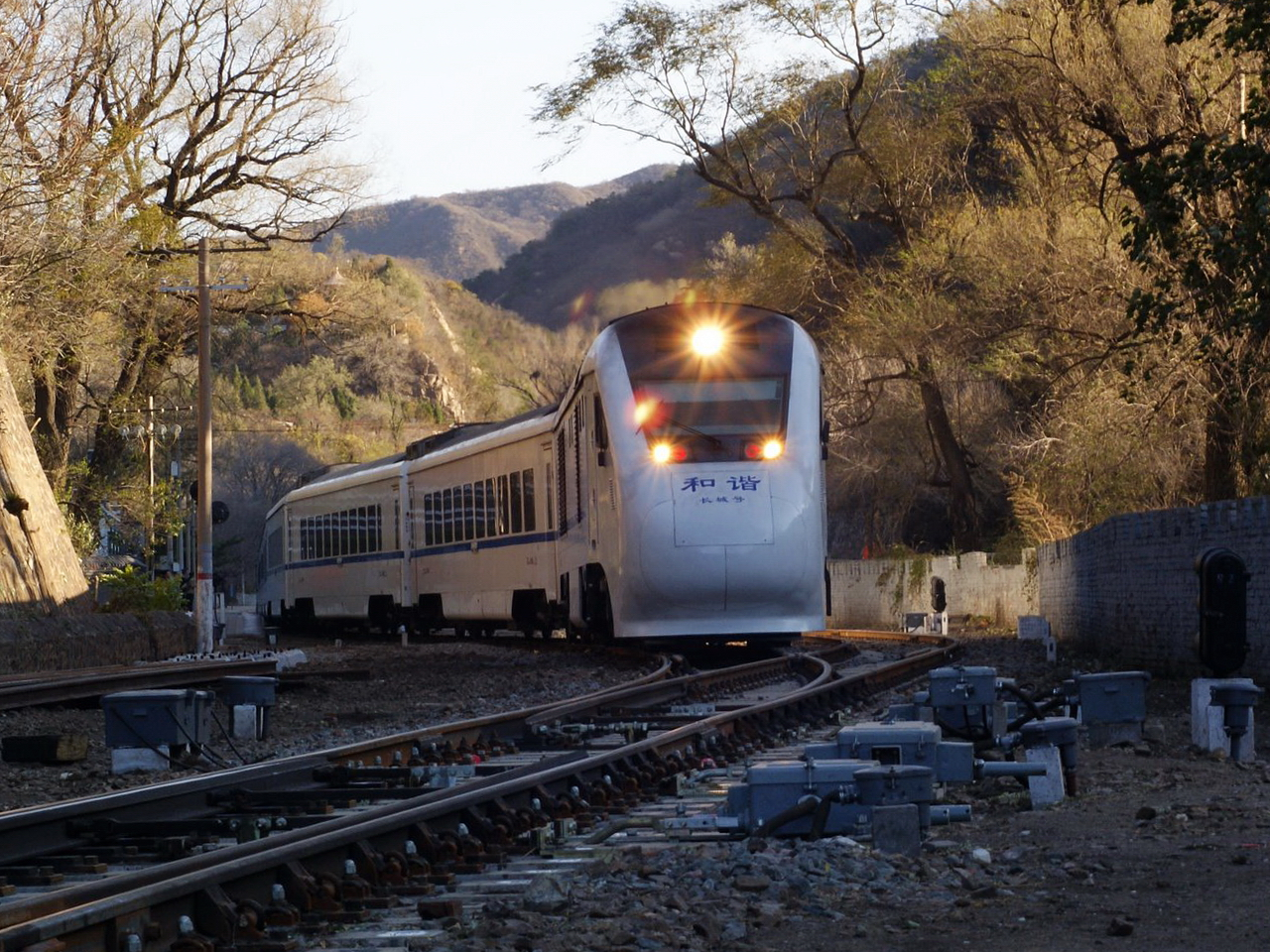
- A NDJ3 approaching Qinglongqiao railway station

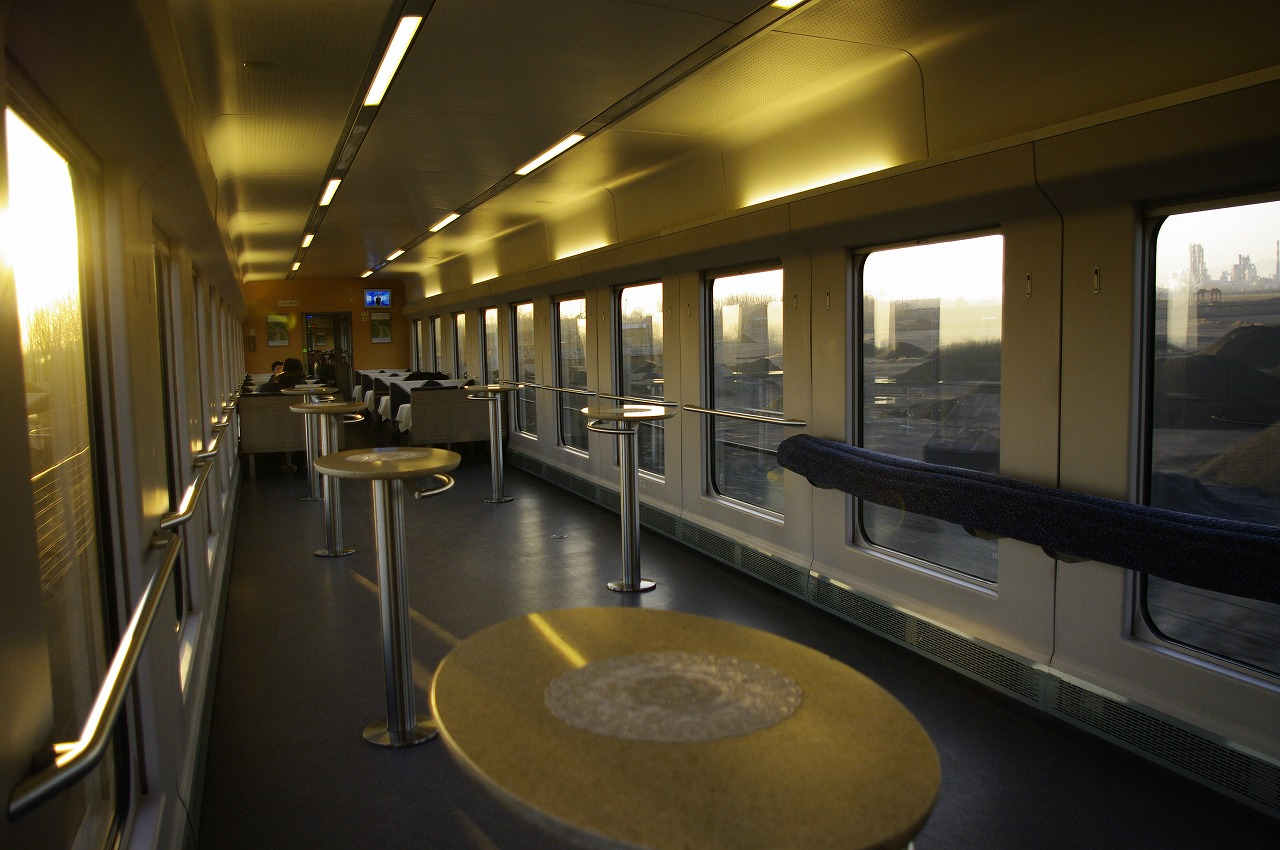
- the buffet car, fitted with panoramic windows
- Built at: CRRC Nanjing Puzhen; CRRC Qishuyan
- Entered service: 2008
- Number built: 9
- Number in service: 9
- Formation: M-T-T-T-T-T-T-T-M (China Railway); M-T-T-T-T-T-T-T-T-M (Nigerian Railway)
- Operators: Beijing Suburban Railway; Nigerian Railway Corporation

Specifications
- Train length: 220.5 m (723 ft 5 in)
- Width: 3.105 m (10 ft 2.2 in)
- Height: 4.433 m (14 ft 6.5 in)
- Wheel diameter: 1.05 m (41 in) (power car, new); 970 mm (38 in) (trailer, new)
- Maximum speed: 160 km/h (99 mph)
- Axle load: 21 tons
- Traction system: 8×530 kW (710 hp)
- Prime mover: two 12V280ZJ
- Engine type: diesel
- Traction motors: ZD106
- Power output: 3,530 kW (4,730 hp)
- Tractive effort: 4,240 kW (5,690 hp)
- Transmission: AC–DC
- Acceleration: 1.368 km/(h⋅s) (0.850 mph/s) (starting)
- AAR wheel arrangement: A1A-A1A
- Track gauge: 1,435 mm (4 ft 8 1/2 in)

The NDJ_{3} "Great Wall", previously labeled the "Harmony Great Wall" is the only higher-speed diesel trainset with power cars that is still operating in China. It was first designed to be used for passenger transport in the 2008 Olympics, and has become a mature technology platform with export orders to Nigeria despite initial flaws related to overheating of electrical cables in the power car.

== Description ==
To fulfil the need for passenger transport between Beijing and Badaling during the 2008 Summer Olympics, the Ministry of Railways ordered four NDJ_{3} DMU trains, with the numbering NDJ_{3} 0001-0004. All of them are with Beijing Bureau, Beijing sector Nanko depot, operating on Line S2 between Beijing North station and Badaling station via Yanqing station, with a later addition of another service from Beijing North to Shacheng station. These sets was the first diesel multiple units designed in China with the ability to negotiate ≥33‰ gradient and a curve of 180 m (590 ft 7 in), optimised for the steeper gradient of the S2 line, although this gearing for steeper lines also reduced the maximum speed from 180 to 160 km/h (112 to 99 mph), although they could be easily geared for higher speeds.

The NDJ_{3} is developed from the NZJ_{1} "Xinshuguang" with a similar 2M7T layout where motor cars are diesel locomotives located on either end in a push–pull configuration, while also drawing from the experience of DF11 and DF11G locomotives. The Qishuyan designed locomotives are fitted with a diesel-electric drive, generating AC which is then converted to DC for the traction motors. The main generator is supplemented by an auxiliary generator, which provides power to the passenger cabins. The Nanjing Puzhen designed passenger carriages are based on the 25T carriage while the exterior paint draws inspiration from the Harmony trains. The passenger carriages have wide doors, extra large sightseeing windows, rotatable seating, disabled toilets and other passenger amenities designed for increased passenger comfort.

=== Flaws ===
While running the S2 which has steep gradients, a burning smell was often noticed coming from the resistors that dissipate energy from braking. This was found to be the fault of cable 13, which heated up significantly in use. It was due to the design where the cable carries the power for both the Eddy current brake and the magnetic excitation for the 4th traction motor. The high temperatures poses a serious risk to safety, as it would degrad the cable faster, leading to a higher risk of fire, but also the risk of the brakes failing if the current is not supplied. At a speed of 28 km/h (17 mph) with the control lever on level 8 braking, the current exceeds the design limit by 1.72 times, and at around 33 km/h (21 mph) with 634 amps for the motor and 623 amps for the brake, the cable heats up to 55.4 °C (131.7 °F). To rectify this flaw, the cables for traction motor 4 were separated into separate cables for braking and motor power. Nonetheless, it has not had any serious accidents, and the set was awarded first place in the 2009 Railway Technology prize.

== Service history ==
=== China ===
This train was put into operation on 6 August 2008 on Line S2 of the BCR. Although it carried the name "Harmony Great Wall" (Chinese: 和谐长城号), it does not actually belong to the Harmony series of trains. During their service, they have also occasionally been used on other lines.

At the end of 2017, Beijing bought two more sets for Huairou–Miyun line. These sets, numbered NDJ_{3} 0005-0007 have only second class seating and do not have a buffet car, significantly increasing the seating capacity. Line S2 was also supposed to receive another three sets, but they were never delivered for unknown reasons.

From October 2019 onwards, the "Harmony" (Hexie) logos were gradually removed from the sets. These sets then carried only the "Great Wall" (Changcheng) logos at the front.

=== Nigeria ===
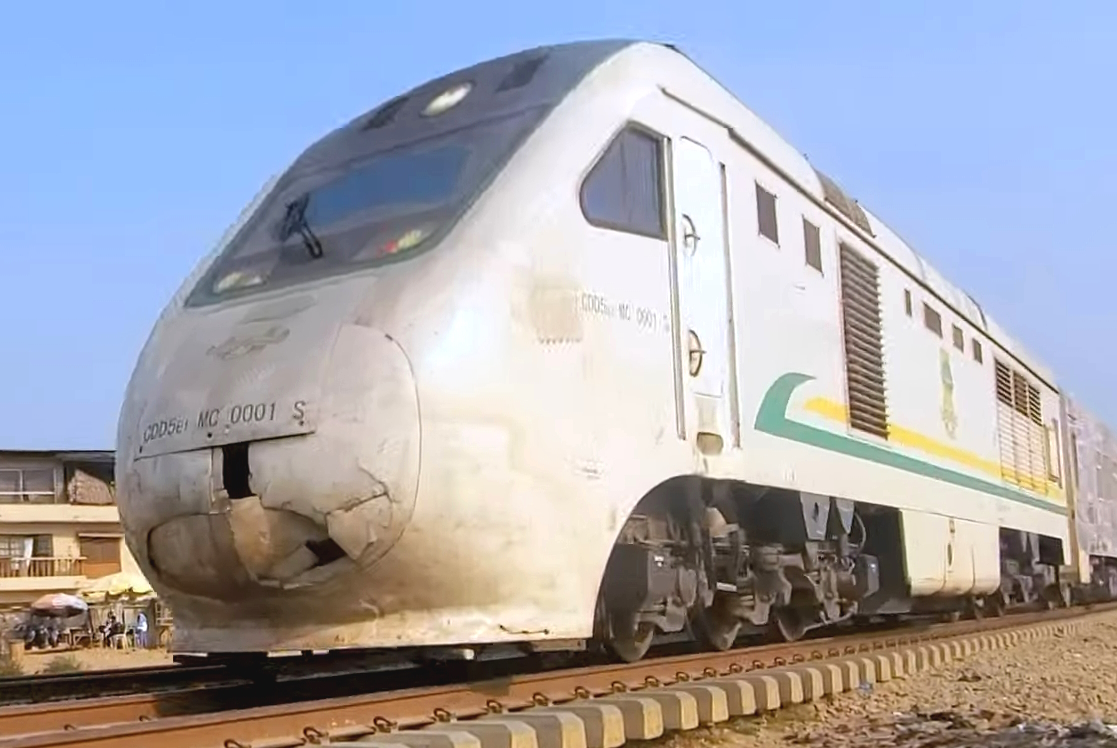
NRC CDD5E1 power car

In 2019, the Nigerian Railway Corporation ordered two sets, as part of the construction of standard gauge railways in the country, in an order with six DF11G, nine DF8 and two DF7 locomotives. In Nigerian service, the sets are classed as CDD5E1. These sets differ with a lower speed at 150 km/h (93 mph), USB charging and have an additional trailer with wheelchair parking, compared to the second series of NDJ_{3} delivered to Beijing. These sets commenced service with the Lagos-Ibadan railway on 7 December 2020.

== Set composition ==
=== Beijing Suburban Railway ===
Numbering	NDJ3 0001/2/3/4_{A/B}	1	2	3	4	5	6	7	NDJ3 0001/2/3/4_{B/A}
Car type	motor car	RZ1 25DT first class seat			CA 25DT buffet car (bar layout)	RZ2 25DT second class seat			motor car
Traction	A1A-A1A	/							A1A-A1A
Wheel configuration	●〇● ●〇●	〇〇 〇〇							●〇● ●〇●
Seats	/	64	60	64	32	74	70	74	/

Numbering	NDJ3 0005/6/7_{A/B}	1	2	3	4	5	6	7	NDJ3 0005/6/7_{B/A}
Car type	motor car	RZ2 25DT second class seat							motor car
Traction	A1A-A1A	/							A1A-A1A
Wheel configuration	●〇● ●〇●	〇〇 〇〇							●〇● ●〇●
Seats	/	114							/

== See also ==
- China Railway NYJ1 diesel multiple unit
- China Railway NZJ diesel multiple unit
- China Railway NZJ1 diesel multiple unit
- China Railway NZJ2 diesel multiple unit
- China Railway Putian diesel multiple unit
- China Railway Tianchi diesel multiple unit
- China Railway TSD09 diesel multiple unit
