= China Railway NZJ2 =

Diesel multiple unit (DMU) train of China Railway

NZJ2 Shenzhou/Jinlun
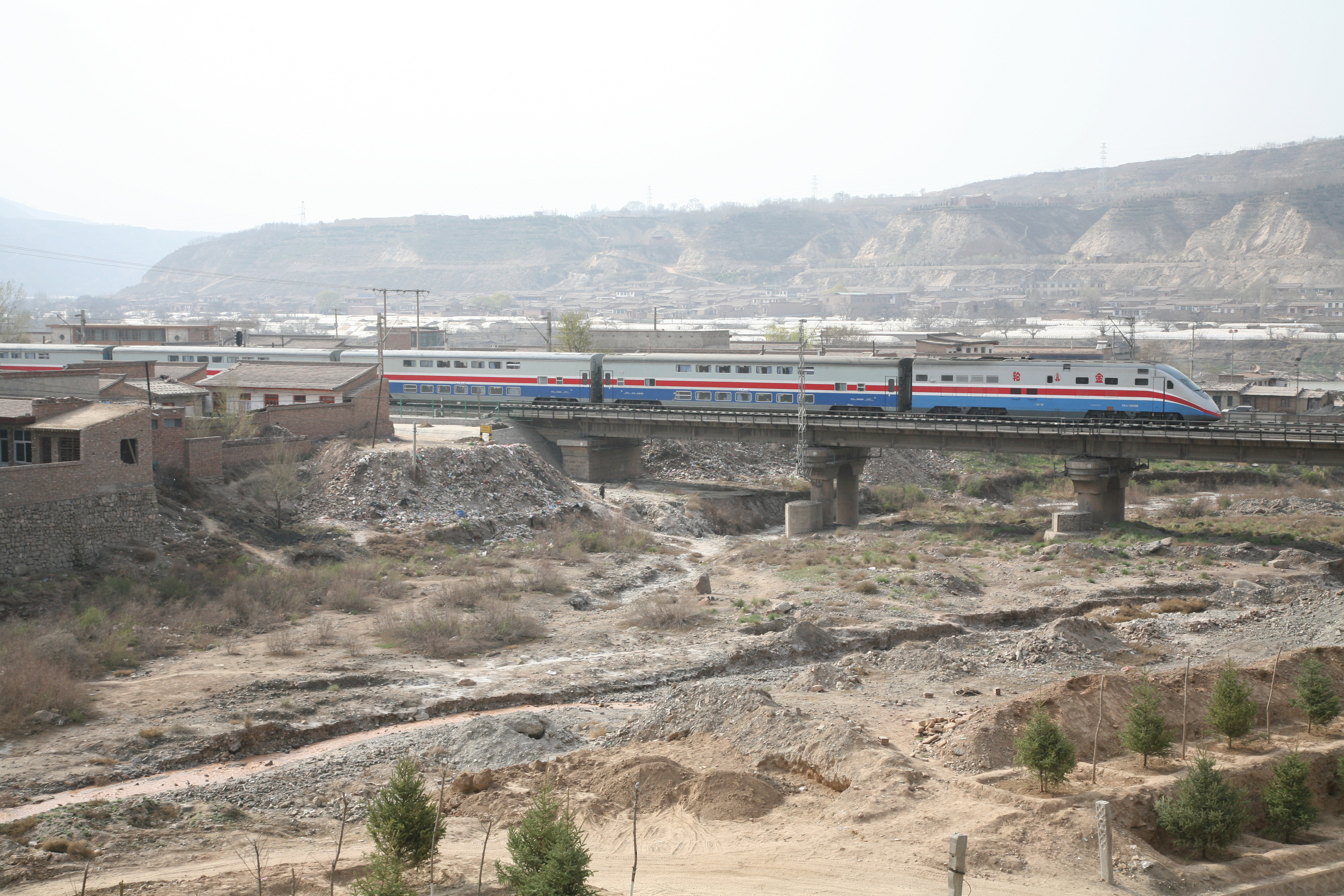
- Jinlun DMU in Ningxia
- In service: 26 July 2001 – April 2010
- Manufacturers: CNR Dalian; CSR Qingdao Sifang
- Constructed: 2001–2003
- Number built: 26 motor cars; 180 trailers
- Formation: 2M10T/2M6T (double-deck); 2M8T (single-deck)
- Capacity: 1,600 (double-deck); 680 (single-deck)
- Operator: China Ministry of Railway

Specifications
- Train length: 309.3 m (1,015 ft) (2M10T double-deck); 203 m (666 ft) (2M6T double-deck); 256.1 m (840 ft) (single-deck)
- Width: 3.105 m (10.19 ft)
- Height: 4.4 m (14 ft)
- Maximum speed: Service (double-deck): 140 km/h (90 mph); Service (single-deck): 160 km/h (100 mph); Design: 180 km/h (110 mph); Experimental: 210.8 km/h (130 mph)
- Power output: 2×2,740 kW (3,670 hp) (double-deck); 2×2,400 kW (3,200 hp) (single-deck)
- Tractive effort: 2,240 kW (3,000 hp) (total traction)
- Transmission: AC-DC electric
- Braking system: JZ-7 electro-pneumatic brake
- Track gauge: 1,435 mm (4 ft 8 1/2 in) (Standard gauge)

The NZJ2 Shenzhou/Jinlun is one of the diesel multiple unit (DMU) trains of China Railway, characterized by its push-pull design.

== Development ==
=== Shenzhou ===
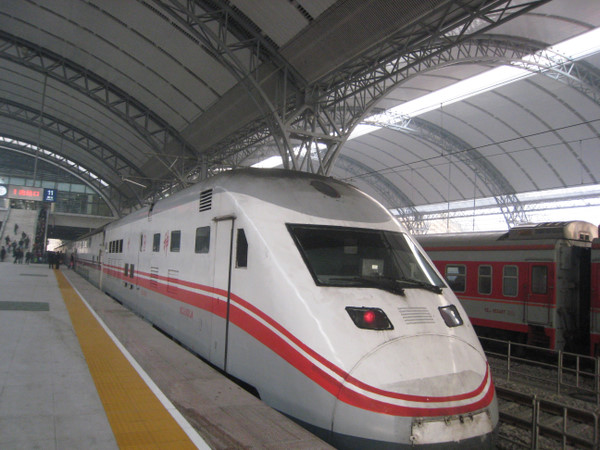
Shenzhou DMU at Hankou railway station

To align with China Railway's acceleration strategy and enhance the market competitiveness of railway passenger transport, Qishuyan Locomotive & Rolling Stock Works, Nanjing Puzhen Rolling Stock Works, and Shanghai Railway Bureau successfully developed the NZJ1 Xinshuguang semi-high-speed diesel multiple unit in 1999. From October of the same year, it was put into operation on the Shanghai-Nanjing Railway and Shanghai-Hangzhou Railway, generating considerable economic benefits.

Drawing lessons from the successful experience of the Shanghai Railway Bureau, the Beijing Railway Bureau, through an analysis of passenger transport conditions on busy sections of main railway lines within its jurisdiction, decided to launch semi-high-speed diesel multiple units between Beijing and Tianjin. At the end of 1999, the Beijing Railway Bureau signed technical specifications and purchase and sales contracts for the trains with Dalian Locomotive & Rolling Stock Works, Changchun Passenger Car Works, and Sifang Rolling Stock Works.

In January 2000, Dalian Works, CNR Changchun, CNR Dalian and CSR Qingdao Sifang began the construction design of the locomotives and rolling stock. On July 28, 2000, Dalian Works completed the trial production of the first two power cars (0001A, 0001B) and assembled them with the first batch of 10 double-deck passenger cars produced by CNR Changchun within the factory. Approved by the Ministry of Railways, the train was officially designated as the NZJ2 type, where "N" stands for diesel multiple unit, "Z" for DC motor, "J" for power-concentrated, and "2" for the second model type. Concurrently, the train was named Shenzhou by the Beijing Railway Bureau.

=== Jinlun ===
The NZJ2 Jinlun (Golden Wheel) is a power-concentrated diesel multiple unit (DMU) developed by CNR Dalian and CSR Qingdao Sifang in 2001. It was improved for plateau adaptability and enhanced with sandstorm protection design, to adapt to the high-altitude and strong sandstorm environments in western regions.

The single-decker trailers adopt the 25K passenger car cross-section height (4433 mm), allowing for sleeper cars, which can meet the requirements of "depart in the evening, arrive in the morning" passenger trains. The trailers are equipped with a microcomputer network monitoring and communication system, with a main control station located in the broadcasting car, providing reliable assurance for the safe operation of the train set. The trailer sets use SW-160 bogies, electronic anti-skid devices, integrated waste retention toilets, tightlock couplers, plug doors, folding gangways, automatic inner end doors, manual double-pull outer end doors, and PC board interior materials. The default formation for the single-decker "Jinlun" train is 2M8T (2 power cars, 8 trailers), consisting of 1 YZ25DT hard seat car, 5 YW25DT hard sleeper cars, and 2 RW25DT soft sleeper cars. The seating capacity is 98 for hard seat cars, 66 for hard sleeper cars, and 36 for soft sleeper cars.

The locomotive's diesel engine model is 16V240ZJE, with a diesel engine power of 3310 kW. The locomotive's nominal power is 2740 kW, and when supplying power to the train, it is 2540 kW. The trailers use SW-160 bogies, the braking system is 104 valve + electro-pneumatic braking, and the power supply type is DC600V (centralized power supply from power cars).

There are a total of 2 double-decker power cars, namely 0009A and 0009B. Single-decker and double-decker power cars have the same height, only the livery is different. Initially, there were 6 trailers, with car numbers RZ110963, YZ347949-347953. Later, 6 more cars (349598-349603) were added, totaling 12 trailers. They were flexibly marshaled in operation, with formations increased or decreased according to actual needs, having been expanded to a maximum of 12 cars. Mixed use of single-decker and double-decker power cars also occurred, and arbitrary formations were also present.

== Operational history ==
On July 28, 2000, the Shenzhou semi-high-speed double-decker diesel multiple unit was completed. It then underwent performance tests on the circular test track of the China Academy of Railway Sciences (CARS) in Beijing. Subsequently, during high-speed tests between Beijing and Qinhuangdao, it reached a maximum speed of 214 km/h. In October 2000, the "Shenzhou" officially entered operation, serving as the Beijing-Tianjin intercity express train.

On October 18, 2000, it commenced service on the Beijing-Tianjin section. In 2001, the Ministry of Railways organized the first comprehensive test on the Qinhuangdao–Shenyang passenger railway. The focus of the test was to evaluate the safety and stability of the "Shenzhou" double-decker diesel multiple unit (experimental formation of 2 power cars and 4 trailers, totaling 6 cars) during operation on the comprehensive test section, and to conduct safety monitoring on typical subgrades, bridges, ballastless tracks, and No. 38 turnouts.

The test speed was increased from 100 km/h to 180 km/h. After thorough verification of relevant data at 180 km/h to ensure safety, the speed was further increased to 200 km/h. Under the command of the Ministry of Railways Qinshen Passenger Dedicated Line Comprehensive Test Leading Group, the Qinhuangdao–Shenyang passenger railway General Command, China Railway Construction Corporation, Shenyang Railway Bureau, Beijing Railway Bureau, and China Academy of Railway Sciences jointly participated. Test preparations began in September 2001, and actual vehicle tests were conducted from December 5-9. The test train completed 15 round trips, achieving a maximum instantaneous test speed of 210.7 km/h. A total of 5 sets (10 units) of power cars were produced, numbered 0001A/B-0005A/B. A total of 4 sets (40 cars) of trailers were produced.

In October 2007, with the commissioning of the Hexie series EMUs, the Shenzhou DMUs were completely withdrawn from the Beijing-Tianjin intercity railway service. They were reallocated to the Liuzhou Railway Bureau and Wuhan Railway Bureau, where both bureaus operated them for their respective internal routes, and they were retired in 2012 and 2013, respectively. In November 2014, the Wuhan Railway Bureau dismantled and scrapped some of the trains.

On May 10, 2001, the trailers for the Jinlun single-decker diesel multiple unit were successfully developed by Sifang Rolling Stock Works. The entire train entered operation on July 26, 2001 (T657/8). The power cars were withdrawn from service in April 2010, then stored at the Baiyin West workshop until they were dismantled in early 2014. The trailers were used as ordinary passenger cars, with a subsequent speed limit of 140 km/h. As of 2024, except for car 347955 which was dismantled, the rest are still in operation.

The power cars of the Jinlun double-decker diesel multiple unit were withdrawn from service in April 2010, then stored at the Baiyin West workshop until they were dismantled in early 2014. The trailers were used as ordinary passenger cars until July 9, 2019. On July 12, 2019, they were returned to Yinchuan, then transferred to Shizuishan for storage, and finally dismantled in Yinchuan in April 2021.

== See also ==
- China Railway NZJ diesel multiple unit
- China Railway NZJ1 diesel multiple unit
- China Railway NDJ3 diesel multiple unit
- China Railway Putian diesel multiple unit
- China Railway Tianchi diesel multiple unit
- China Railway TSD09 diesel multiple unit
- China Railway DF11 diesel locomotive
