= China Railway Tianchi =

High-speed DMU

Tianchi diesel multiple unit
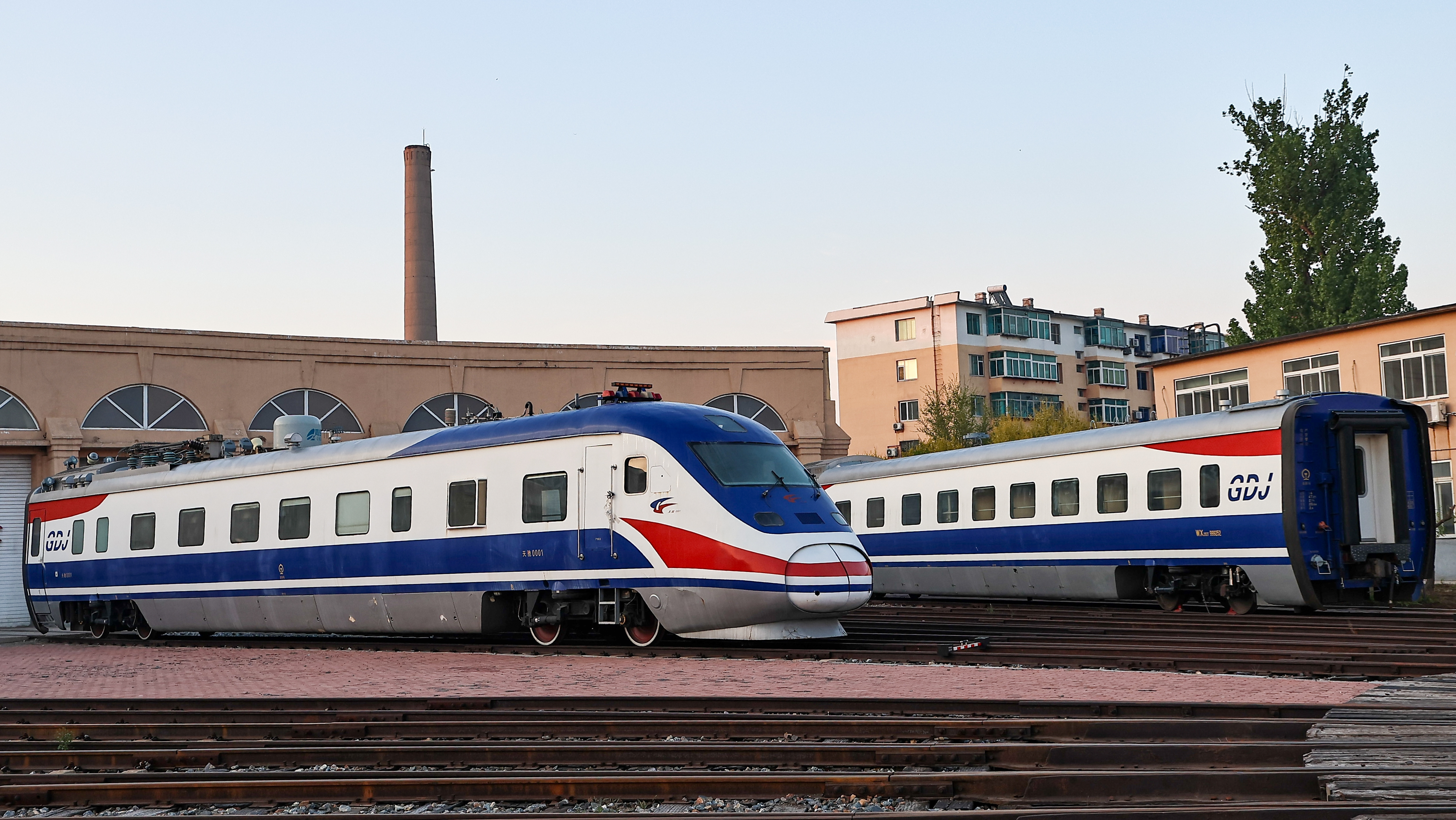
- A Tianchi-0001 power car and carriage at Dashiqiao
- Manufacturer: CRRC Qingdao Sifang
- Constructed: 2005
- Number built: 1 set
- Formation: 3 cars (1M2T)
- Capacity: 10 (test equipment and limited passenger seating)
- Operators: China Ministry of Railways; China Railway Shenyang Group

Specifications
- Width: 3.204 m (10.51 ft)
- Height: 4.050 m (13.29 ft)
- Wheelbase: 2.600 m (8.53 ft)
- Maximum speed: Service: 180 km/h (110 mph); Design: 200 km/h (120 mph)
- Axle load: Power car: ≤21.5 t (47,000 lb); Trailer car: ≤14.5 t (32,000 lb)
- Prime mover: 1×Cummins diesel engine
- Power output: 2,100 kW (2,800 hp) (engine)
- Tractive effort: 2,240 kW (3,000 hp) (total traction)
- Transmission: AC-DC-AC electric
- Bogies: SD-200, SW-220
- Braking systems: Rheostatic braking, air braking
- Track gauge: 1,435 mm (4 ft 8 1/2 in) standard gauge

The Tianchi is a high-speed comprehensive dynamic inspection DMU developed by CRRC Qingdao Sifang of China South Locomotive & Rolling Stock Corporation Limited. The train adopts a "one power car and two trailer cars" formation, AC transmission system, and new high-speed bogies. Its design maximum speed is 200 km/h (120 mph), and it also features track, signaling, and pantograph-catenary inspection functions.

== Technical characteristics ==
=== Overall structure ===
The Tianchi diesel multiple unit adopts a "one power car and two trailer cars" formation (Mc+T+Tc), consisting of 1 power car with a driver's cab, 1 intermediate trailer car, and 1 trailer car with a driver's cab. The power car features a drum-shaped frame-type load-bearing car body and a through double-sided internal corridor. From front to back, it consists of the driver's cab, electrical compartment, power compartment, and braking auxiliary compartment. Fuel tanks and battery sets are installed between the two bogies under the car body. The train also adopts a streamlined front end to reduce air resistance during high-speed operation. The trailer car with a driver's cab contains a comprehensive inspection room, 4 seating compartments, 1 conference room, as well as a catering room, washrooms, and toilets. A dedicated inspection pantograph is installed on the roof. The intermediate trailer car houses various dynamic and static inspection equipment. The comprehensive inspection equipment on the train includes track inspection equipment, communication and signaling inspection equipment, and pantograph-catenary inspection equipment. The train power supply system is 380 V three-phase AC.

=== Transmission system ===
The main transmission system is an AC-DC-AC electric transmission. The diesel engine directly drives a synchronous main traction generator to produce three-phase electric power, which is then rectified into direct current by a three-phase full-wave main silicon rectifier to supply power to 2 traction inverters. The inverters then convert the DC power into variable-frequency three-phase AC power, which is supplied to the 4 asynchronous traction motors on the two bogies. The train uses a "LonWorks" network control system, consisting of a train bus and a multifunction vehicle bus. The train bus comprises 2 sets of shielded twisted pair cables running through the entire train, while the vehicle bus within the power car is a single set of shielded twisted pair cables connecting all control units.

=== Bogies ===
The power car's running gear uses SD-200 type bolsterless high-speed bogies. The bogies feature a fully welded "H"-shaped frame, single tie-rod axle box positioning, and primary suspension with axle box coil springs and hydraulic shock absorbers. The secondary suspension uses a high-flexibility coil spring structure, and is equipped with vertical and lateral hydraulic shock absorbers and anti-hunting dampers. Tractive effort and braking force are transmitted through a central push-pull low-position traction device. The traction motors are installed using a double-sided six-link wheelset hollow shaft fully suspended drive device.

The trailer car bogies use SW-220 type high-speed bogies. This type of bogie was jointly developed by Sifang Rolling Stock Company and Kawasaki Heavy Industries of Japan, drawing on the bogie structure and experience of the 500 Series Shinkansen electric multiple unit. It features an "H"-shaped welded frame, swing-arm type axle box suspension and positioning device. The central suspension system is a bolsterless air spring structure, and the car body and bogie are also equipped with anti-hunting shock absorbers. The basic braking system is axle disc brakes with electronic anti-slip devices, with three brake discs installed on each axle.

=== Train formation ===
Car type	Power car	Intermediate trailer car	Control car
Power configuration	●● ●● (Mc)	〇〇 〇〇 (T)	〇〇 〇〇 (Tc)
Car number	Tianchi 0001	WX_{25DT} 999252	Tianchi 0001
Manufacturer	CRRC Qingdao Sifang		
Bogies	SD-200	SW-220	SW-220
Main equipment	Driver's cab Diesel engine set AC transmission system	Comprehensive inspection equipment	Driver's cab Comprehensive inspection equipment Inspection pantograph

== Usage ==
The "Tianchi" train was delivered to the China Railway Shenyang Group in December 2005, initially adopting a "one power car and one trailer car" formation. In 2005, Sifang Rolling Stock Company manufactured an additional intermediate trailer car for the "Tianchi" train, expanding its formation to "one power car and two trailer cars". Besides being used for comprehensive line inspection within the Shenyang Railway Group's jurisdiction, the "Tianchi" train can also serve as a special train for railway bureau leaders. It is usually parked at the Shenyang North Locomotive Depot.

On April 25, 2018, the "Tianchi" train underwent trial runs on the Shenyang–Dalian Railway, with two additional 25B type non-powered trailer cars added to its formation.

== See also ==
- China Railway NZJ diesel multiple unit
- China Railway NZJ1 diesel multiple unit
- China Railway NZJ2 diesel multiple unit
- China Railway NDJ3 diesel multiple unit
- China Railway Putian diesel multiple unit
- China Railway Tianchi diesel multiple unit
- China Railway TSD09 diesel multiple unit
