= NZJ =

NZJ could refer to:

- China Railway NZJ
- Marine Corps Air Station El Toro (FAA code: NZJ)
