= Shanghai–Hangzhou railway =

Railway line in China

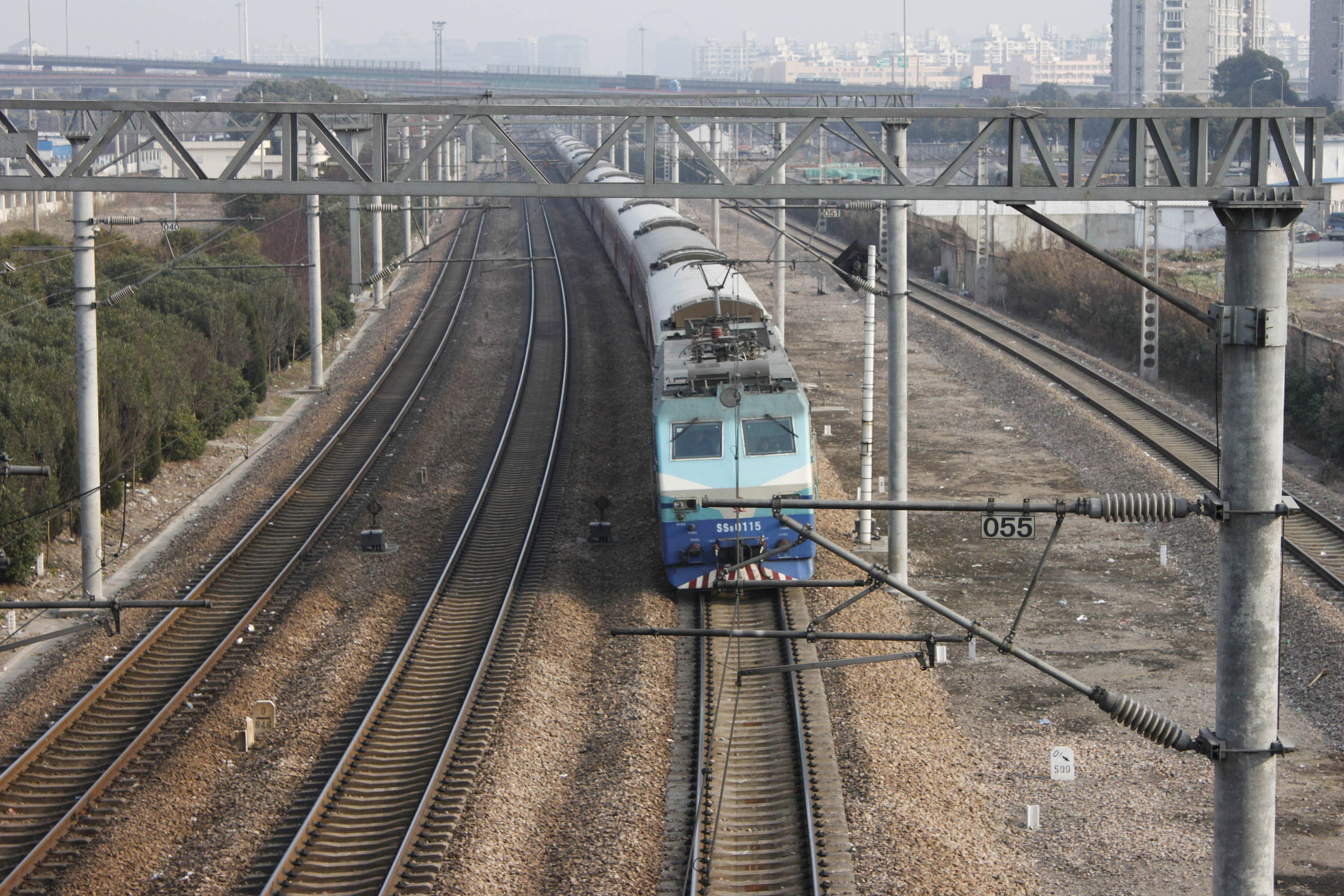
- The Shanghai–Hangzhou Railway at Xinzhuang in Shanghai's Minhang District
- Traditional Chinese: 滬杭鐵路
- Simplified Chinese: 沪杭铁路
- Literal meaning: Shanghai–Hangzhou Railroad
Transcriptions
Standard Mandarin
- Hanyu Pinyin: Hùháng tiělù Hù–Háng tiělù
- Wade–Giles: Hu-hang T'ieh-lu; Hu–Hang T'ieh-lu

The Shanghai–Hangzhou railway, also known as the Huhang railway, is a double-track railroad in eastern China between Shanghai and Hangzhou in Zhejiang Province. Its Chinese name derives from the character abbreviations Hu (from Shanghai's former status as a fishing village) and Hang (from an old Yue placename). The line is 200 km (124 mi) long and was originally built from 1906 to 1909. Cities along the route include Shanghai, Jiaxing and Hangzhou. The line now forms part of the Shanghai–Kunming railway.

== History ==
In 1898, the Qing government of China granted to Britain a concession to build a railway between Shanghai and Hangzhou. This concession drew strong domestic opposition against foreign ownership of railways. In 1905, the Qing government's railway construction policy shifted in favor of local provincial governments. Jiangsu and Zhejiang provinces received approval to build the Shanghai–Hangzhou railway and raised 4.84 and 3.88 million silver dollars, respectively, for the project through chartered companies. Construction began in September 1906 on the western (Hangzhou–Fengjing) section and in February 1907 on the eastern (Fengjing–Shanghai) section. The western section entered into operation in April 1909, the two sections were joined together in June and through-train operation began in July. The line was 186.2 km (115.7 mi) in length.

After the Xinhai Revolution, the national government purchased the railway from the two provincially chartered companies, and in 1915, the line was extended in Shanghai to join with the Shanghai–Nanjing railway at the Shanghai North railway station. The railroad was initially unable to compete with the lower price of river and canal shipping for freight; instead, it made over 70% of its income from passenger service, especially the tourist trade from Shanghai to Hangzhou.

During World War II, the line was bombed and rebuilt by the Japanese occupying forces. In the Chinese Civil War, Nationalist forces destroyed 16 bridges on the line to stall the Communist advance on Shanghai in the spring of 1949. Service was restored on August 1, 1949, and the bridges were fully rebuilt in 1950. The line was electrified from 2004 to 2006. In 2007, during the Sixth Railway Speed-Up Campaign, the line was organized into the Shanghai–Kunming railway.

== Rail connections ==
- Shanghai: Beijing–Shanghai railway
- Hangzhou: Xiaoshan–Ningbo railway, Xuancheng–Hangzhou railway, Zhejiang–Jiangxi railway

== See also ==
- List of railways in China
