= Campaign to raise the speed of railway travel in China =

1997-2007 projects for faster trains in China

The Campaign to raise the speed of railway travel in China or the China Railway Speed Up Campaign (Chinese: 中国铁路大提速) was a series of initiatives undertaken by the Ministry of Railways from 1997 to 2007 to increase the speed of train travel in China by improving the nation's railways. The campaign was implemented in six rounds and increased average speed of passenger trains in China from 43 to 70 kilometers per hour (27 to 43 miles per hour).

== Overview ==
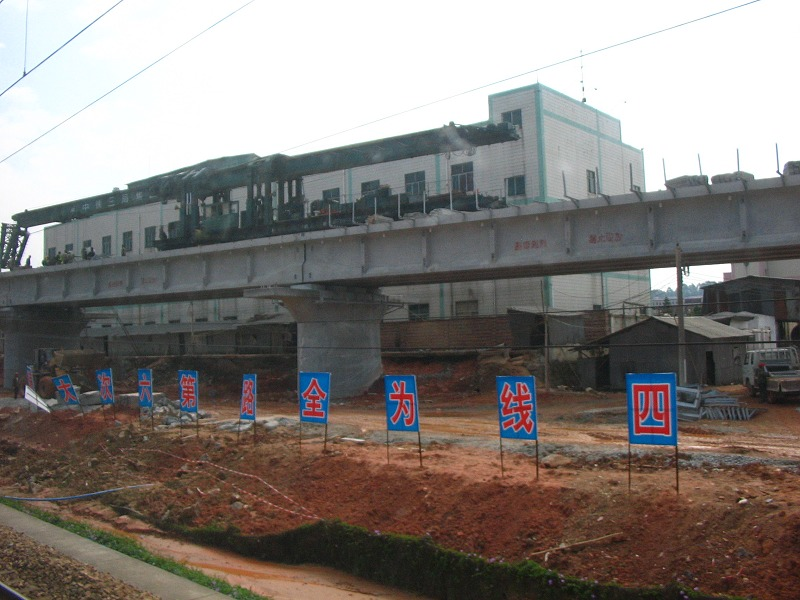
The building of the fourth line of the Guangshen Railway (pictured here in Feb. 2007) allows faster passenger train traffic to be separated from slower freight traffic. It is one of the earliest examples of a passenger dedicated line.

In 1993, commercial train service in China averaged only 48 km/h (30 mph) and was steadily losing market share to airline and highway travel on the country's expanding network of expressways. The MOR focused modernization efforts on increasing the service speed and capacity on existing lines through double-tracking, electrification, improvements in grade (through tunnels and bridges), reductions in turn curvature, and installation of continuous welded rail. Through five rounds of "speed-up" campaigns in April 1997, October 1998, October 2000, November 2001, and April 2004, passenger service on 7,700 km (4,800 mi) of existing tracks was upgraded to reach sub-high speeds of 160 km/h (99 mph).

A notable example is the Guangzhou-Shenzhen Railway, which in December 1994 became the first line in China to offer sub-high speed service of 160 km/h (99 mph) using domestically produced DF-class diesel locomotives. The line was electrified in 1998, and Swedish-made X 2000 trains increased service speed to 200 km/h (120 mph). After the completion of a third track in 2000 and a fourth in 2007, the line became the first in China to run high-speed passenger and freight service on separate tracks. The completion of the sixth and final round of the "speed up" campaigns in April 2007 brought HSR service to more existing lines: 423 km (263 mi) capable of 250 km/h (160 mph) train service and 3,002 km (1,865 mi) capable of 200 km/h (120 mph). Some 7,000 km (4,300 mi) of tracks could accommodate trains traveling at speeds up to 160 km/h (99 mph). In all, travel speed was increased on 22,000 extended km (13,700 extended mi), or one-fifth, of the national rail network, and the average speed of a passenger train improved to 70 km/h (43 mph). The introduction of more non-stop service between large cities also helped to reduce travel time. The non-stop express train from Beijing to Fuzhou shortened travel time from 33.5 to less than 20 hours.

In addition to track and scheduling improvements, the deployment of the CRH series trains raised travel speed. During the sixth railway speedup campaign, 52 CRH trainsets (CRH1, CRH2 and CRH5) were put into operation, service as 280 train numbers. By the end of 2007, there were planned to have 158 CRH trainsets, 514 train numbers in operation. The new trains sliced 2 hours off of the 1,463 km (909 mi) trip between Beijing and Shanghai to a journey of just under 10 hours. Travel times from Shanghai to Changsha (1,199 km, 745 mi) fell by 1.5 hour to 7.5 hours and the trip to Nanchang was halved.

== Summary ==
The Six "Speed-Up" campaigns (1997–2007)

Campaign	Date	Cumulative extended length of track (double-track counted twice) that can accommodate high-speed trains having a maximum speed of at least:					National average passenger train speed
Campaign	Date	120 km/h (75 mph)	140 km/h (87 mph)	160 km/h (99 mph)	200 km/h (124 mph)	250 km/h (155 mph)	National average passenger train speed
First	1997-04-01	1,398 km (869 mi)	1,340 km (833 mi)	752 km (467 mi)			54.9 km/h (34.1 mph)
Second	1998-10-01	6,449 km (4,007 mi)	3,522 km (2,188 mi)	1,104 km (686 mi)			55.2 km/h (34.3 mph)
Third	2000-10-21	9,581 km (5,953 mi)	6,458 km (4,013 mi)	1,104 km (686 mi)			60.3 km/h (37.5 mph)
Fourth	2001-11-21	13,166 km (8,181 mi)	9,779 km (6,076 mi)	1,104 km (686 mi)			62.6 km/h (38.9 mph)
Fifth	2004-04-18	16,500 km (10,253 mi)		7,700 km (4,785 mi)	1,960 km (1,218 mi)		65.7 km/h (40.8 mph)
Sixth	2007-04-18	22,000 km (13,670 mi)		14,000 km (8,699 mi)	6,003 km (3,730 mi)	846 km (526 mi)	70.2 km/h (43.6 mph)

== Sixth Round ==
Following the sixth round of the "railway speed up campaign" on April 18, 2007, some 6,003 extended km of track could carry trains at speeds of up to 200 km/h. Of these, 848 km could attain 250 km/h. These include the Qinhuangdao-Shenyang (Qinshen) Passenger Railway, which was initially built for 200 km/h trains when completed in 2003 and then upgraded to 250 km/h during the Sixth Speed-up Campaign, and sections of the Qingdao-Jinan (Jiaoji), Shanghai-Kunming (Hukun) (between Shanghai and Zhuzhou), Guangzhou-Shenzhen (Guangshen), Beijing-Shanghai (Jinghu), Beijing-Harbin (Jingha), Beijing-Guangzhou (Jingguang), Longhai (between Zhengzhou to Xuzhou) Railways. Upgrade work continues on other lines including the Wuhan-Danyang (Handan), Hunan-Guizhou (Xianggui), and Nanjing-Nantong (Ningqi) Railways.

Upgraded High-Speed Rail Tracks After the Sixth Speed-Up Campaign (2007-04-18)
(Capable of Accommodating Train Speeds of 200+ km/h)

Line	Upgraded Section	Upgraded Track Length in km (double track counted twice)
Beijing-Harbin (Jingha)	Tongxian–Fengrun (K27.2–K148.4)	242.4
Beijing-Harbin (Jingha)	Shanhaiguan–Huanggutun (K319–K697), of which the Shanhaiguan–Taian (K323–K603) section (560 km) was upgraded to 250 km/h	756
Beijing-Harbin (Jingha)	Caijiagou–Wujia (K1172–K1226)	108
Beijing-Shanghai (Jinghu)	Zhoulizhuang–Qingxian (K162.4–K218.8)	112.8
Beijing-Shanghai (Jinghu)	Jiedi–Changzhuang (K260.8–K363.6)	205.6
Beijing-Shanghai (Jinghu)	Gaojiaying–Fuliji (K810.6–K859)	96.8
Beijing-Shanghai (Jinghu)	Sùzhou–Tangnanji (K877.2–K918.2)	82
Beijing-Shanghai (Jinghu)	Zhenjiang South–Benniu (K1217.8–K1269.2)	102.8
Beijing-Shanghai (Jinghu)	Kunshan–Shanghai (K1402.7–K1450), of which the Anting–Shanghai West (K1425.9–K1446) section (40.2 km) was upgraded to 250 km/h	94.6
Beijing-Guangzhou (Jingguang)	Doudian–Caohe (K30.2–K123.1)	185.8
Beijing-Guangzhou (Jingguang)	Yuanshi–Xingtai (K309.3–K377.6)	136.6
Beijing-Guangzhou (Jingguang)	Hebi–Weihui (K532–K571.6)	79.2
Beijing-Guangzhou (Jingguang)	Guanting–Luohe (K732.2–K815.9), of which the Xuchang South–Mengmiao (K764.1–K809) section (89.8 km) was upgraded to 250 km/h	167.4
Beijing-Guangzhou (Jingguang)	Huohe–Changtaiguan (K821–K956), of which the Luohe–Suiping (K821–K863) section (84 km) was upgraded to 250 km/h	270
Beijing-Guangzhou (Jingguang)	Lijiazhai–Chenjiahe (K1108.5–K1065.4)	113.8
Guangzhou-Shenzhen (Guangshen)	Xintang–Honghai (K39.8–K61.4)	43.2
Longhai	Tongshan–Zhengzhou East (K232.6–K563)	660.8
Longhai	Xianyang–Changxing (K1096–K1179.8)	167.6
Shanghai-Kunming (Hukun)	Bailutang–tangya (K222.5–K344.6)	244.2
Shanghai-Kunming (Hukun)	Bailongqiao–Guixi (K363.7–K645.9)	364.4
Shanghai-Kunming (Hukun)	Yingtan–Binjiang (K664.5–K934.9)	540.8
Shanghai-Kunming (Hukun)	Xicun–Baiyuan (K991.1–K1015)	47.8
Shanghai-Kunming (Hukun)	Yaojiazhou–Wulidun (K1035.7–K1090.6)	109.8
Qingdao-Jinan (Jiaoji)	Loushan–Licheng (K23.2–K345.2), of which the Jimo–Gaomi (K50–K86) section (72 km) was upgraded to 250 km/h	644
Wuhan-Jiujiang (Wujiu)	Heliu–Yangxin (K38.4–K152.1)	227.4
Total	6,003.8 km (200 km/h+), including 846 km (250 km/h)	
