= China Railway TSD09 =

TSD09
- Manufacturer: Tangshan Locomotive
- Constructed: 2003
- Entered service: never entered service
- Number built: 2
- Number in service: 0
- Formation: Mc-M-T-M-Mc
- Capacity: 358 (five car)
- Operators: Sanmao Railway (as planned)

Specifications
- Train length: 132 metres (433 ft 1 in)
- Car length: 26.7 m (87 ft 7 in) (control car); 26.3 m (86 ft 3 in) (trailer car)
- Width: 3,080 mm (10 ft 1 in)
- Height: 3,890 mm (12 ft 9 in)
- Maximum speed: 176 km/h (109 mph)
- Prime mover(s): Cummins QSK19
- Engine type: diesel engine
- Power output: 2236 kW
- Tractive effort: 160 kN
- Transmission: Voith T331R hydraulic transmission
- Track gauge: 1,435 mm (4 ft 8 1/2 in)

The TSD09 diesel multiple unit is a tilting train developed by Tangshan Locomotive in 2003 and fitted with Cummins diesel engines, Voith hydraulic transmission and Extel Systems Wedel tilting mechanisms. It was built for Sanmao Railway, but due to strategic reasons within the Ministry of Railways, the set never operated commercially and has been permanently stored at Tangshan Locomotive.

== Development ==
=== Background ===
To develop and research tilting trains for the purpose of raising passenger railway transport, while also filling the operational model of the Guangshen Railway with "smaller consists, high density, high speed". As such, in 1998 the ministry and Guangshen Railway requested to Adtranz to borrow a X2000 tilting train, which was put into service in August 1998 on the Guangzhou-Shenzhen railway. The X2000 performed well on the Guangshen line, and had a noticeable effect on the profitability of the line. During the period where Fu Zhihuan was the minister for railways, various modernisation projects of lines and rolling stock occurred, and the development of tilting trains were pushed forward. In 1999, the ministry approved the project for the first tilting train, the Putian DMU, to be built by Dalian Locomotive, Nanjing Puzhen and Tangshan Locomotive.

The Sanmao Railway company is one of the railway companies of Guangdong, who are responsible for the operation of 369 km of railway, mainly the Guangsan Railway and the Sanmao Railway. The success of Putian DMU attracted the attention of various railway bureaus in China, including the Sanmao Railway. At the time, the Sanmao Railway was speed limited to 120 km/h, and they could not, at the time, afford major modernisations. However, calculations showed that using tilting trains at a speed of 120 km/h would still bring the travel time between Guangzhou and Maoming to 3.5 hours, 2 hours less than before. However, as it was already poor in finances, it could not afford to buy foreign trains, such as the X 2000, and thus opted to cooperate with Tangshan Locomotive for a tilting train.

=== Research ===
In June 2001, Sanmao Railway company discussed the purchase of a DMU, which was subsequently handed over to the Guangdong Province development bureau, who approved the project. In February 2002, a contract between the railway company and Tangshan locomotive for cooperation was signed, for the delivery of two 5-car DMU by the end of 2003 for a total contractual value of CN¥98,800,000. According to the contract, CN¥40,000,000 was paid upfront, while the entire process of the development would occur under the guidance of the ministry.

In January 2003, the contract for purchase was signed. Apart from Tangshan Locomotive, Southwest Jiaotong University and Beijing Jiaotong University also participated in the development.

According to the original agreement, the DMU would have been put into service by the end of 2003. Three pairs of early, midday, and late services from Guangzhou station to Maomingdong station would have been operated, with the fastest trip being completed in 3.5 hours, with a top speed of 120 km/h (75 mph), except from Sanshui to Yaogu, which could be run at 130 km/h (81 mph), with maintenance for the sets to be conducted at Maomingdong station. The set was purchased with financing, with Sanmao Railway directly paying CN¥30,000,000 and the other CN¥68,800,000 coming from loans. According to calculations, with a loading of 60.4%, the loans could be repaid within 8 years.

=== Change of minister ===
However, in March 2003, Liu Zhijun replaced Bo Zhihuan as the minister for railways, and there was a subsequent significant change in railway strategy, and talk of tilting trains also faded. In early 2003, Sanmao Railway submitted plans to begin the operation of the tilting trains to the ministry but never received approval. By the end of 2003, the two sets were completed, but without approval for operation, Sanmao Railway could not accept the trains. The train finally underwent running-in in May to June 2004, on the Beijing Ring Railway, but then were returned to Tangshan Locomotive. The exact reasons for the lack of approval for the tilting trains are unknown, though according to the Southern City Daily, there was a belief of the lack of need in the future for tilting trains, with dedicated high-speed lines being built, and thus tilting trains were unnecessary.

The abandonment of the tilting trains caused significant financial losses to both Sanmao Railway and Tangshan Locomotive. For the development of tilting trains, Tangshan Locomotive invested over CN¥50,000,000, and over CN¥100,000,000 in building the train, and at least a few hundred thousand were spent on maintaining the set in an operable state every year.

== Technical specifications ==
=== Overall structure ===
The TSD09 was originally supposed to have a four-car, fully motorised layout, with four motor cars; as Sanmao Railway ordered a five-car train, an additional trailer was inserted between the two middle motor cars, with a 4M1T layout (Mc+M+T+M+Mc). The various power equipment is all located underneath the car and has a similar overall structure to the Putian DMU. To ensure smoother airflow, the inter-carriage spaces are fully sealed, the doors are plug doors and the control cars have a streamlined layout, and skirts were added below the carriages.

Each set has four 2nd class seating carriages with a two by two layout, and a mixed 1st/2nd class carriage with 1st class seats in a two by one layout. The set also had two conference rooms.

=== Traction equipment ===
The set was a diesel-hydraulic transmission DMU, with the diesel engine outputting torque through a universal joint, hydraulic transmission box, and the axle gearbox to drive the train. Each motor carriage has a Cummins QSK-19R horizontal diesel engine, a six cylinder inline, four stroke, turbocharged high-speed diesel engine and compliant with Euro II standards. The transmission is a Voith T311r, which has a torque converter and a fluid coupler, with automatic gear switching.

=== Tilting mechanism ===
The tilting mechanism was based on the Deutsche Bahn 611 and 612 DMU, using the same Neicontrol-E, supplied by ESW Neicontrol-E, an electrically actuated tilting mechanism. It is installed in the bogie, and is controlled by an AC motor fed from various data sensors on the train, and interpreted by microcomputers, which is then communicated to the system by a RS-422 bus, for a maximum tilting angle of ±8°.

=== Bogie ===
The TSD09 was fitted model TW-160B bogies, on both the trailer and motor cars, although differences exist in the presence of traction equipment and brakes. The bogie is welded from steel into an "H" shape, with first stage suspension being the gearbox and the second stage being air suspension. Braking is mostly done with disc brakes, with each axle having two.

Carriage exterior					
Position in set	1	2	3	4	5
Car type	Mixed 1st/2nd class	2nd class			2nd class
Traction	〇● 〇〇	〇● 〇〇	〇〇 〇〇	〇〇 ●〇	〇〇 ●〇
Traction	Mc	M	T	M	Mc
Axle layout	1A-2	1A-2	2-2	2-A1	2-A1
Features	control cabin diesel motor; hydraulic transmission tilt sensors and processors tilt actuators	diesel motor; hydraulic transmission tilt actuators	tilt actuators	diesel motor; hydraulic transmission tilt actuators	control cabin diesel motor; hydraulic transmission tilt sensors and processors tilt actuators
Bogie	TW-160B				
Passenger amenities	business cabins, AV broadcast room, toilet	toilet	toilet	snack shop, toilet	toilet
Occupancy	21+31	80	80	64	62

== See also ==
- Putian DMU
- X2000
- DB Class 611
- DB Class 612
