= China Railway NZJ =

Diesel multiple unit of China

NZJ "Lushan"
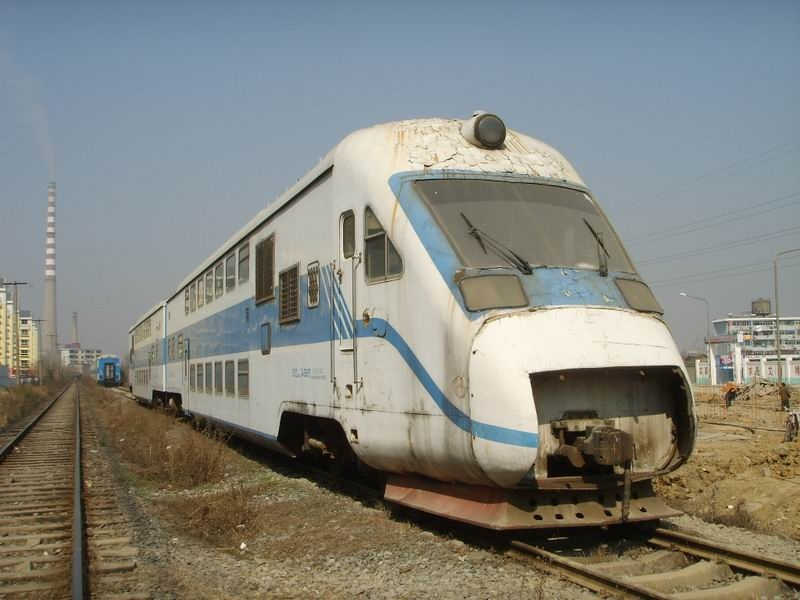
- The NZJ stored at Nanchang Electric Locomotive factory
- In service: 1998-2010
- Built at: Tangshan Locomotive
- Constructed: 1998-1999, 2000
- Number built: 6 motors, 6 trailers
- Formation: Mc-T-T-Mc
- Fleet numbers: NZJ-0001, NZJ1-0001-0002
- Operators: ~~China Railways~~ （Nanchang Railway Bureau）

Specifications
- Train length: 105 m (344 ft 6 in)
- Car length: 27 m (88 ft 7 in) (motor); 25.5 m (83 ft 8 in) (trailer)
- Width: 3.204 m (10 ft 6.1 in)
- Height: 3.95 m (13 ft 0 in)
- Maximum speed: 120 kilometres per hour (75 mph)
- Weight: ≤17,000 kg (37,479 lb) (trailer) ≤18,000 kg (39,683 lb) (motor)
- Axle load: 18 tons
- Steep gradient: ≤20‰
- Traction system: 2×660 kW (890 hp)
- Prime mover: Cummins QST30-G3
- Traction motors: ZQDR-110
- Transmission: AC–DC
- Acceleration: ≥0.828 km/(h⋅s) (0.514 mph/s)）
- Bogies: TW-160D, 209PK
- Track gauge: 1,435 mm (4 ft 8 1/2 in)

The NZJ "Lushan", (Note: NZJ stands for: N–internal combustion; Z–DC motor; J–power concentrated (locomotive)) also registered as the NZJ_{1} are a class of diesel multiple unit (DMU) of China Railway. These sets were built by Tangshan Locomotive in a 2M2T layout of four cars with Cummins diesel engines and Siemens electrical equipment. Three sets were built in total between 1998 and 2000, with two operated by Nanchang Railway Bureau and one by Kunming Railway Bureau.

== Development history ==
=== Background ===
From the mid-1990s, short distance and intercity services saw great decreases in passenger volume, due to competition from highways. To win back patronage on mid to short distance journeys, the Tangshan Locomotive with the support of the Ministry of Railways technological development department and China Railways Locomotive Company, started developing a new DMU in 1996, designed for intercity transport. In April 1997, the first such vehicle was rolled out at Tangshan Locomotive, an electrical transmission DMU, for Harbin Railway Bureau. Afterwards, the designers started work for a double deck DMU design, which would become the NZJ class DMU.

=== Service history ===
In May 1998, Tangshan Locomotive completed the development of the first double-decker diesel multiple unit; on the 22 and 23 of the same month, the set underwent running in on the Beijing–Qinhuangdao railway and the Beijing–Chengde railway, which also included a safety test, with the highest speed reached in the test being 137 km/h (85 mph). It was presented on 29 May 1998 at Tangshan Locomotive. It was handed over to Nanchang Railway Bureau on 5 June. Operation began on 18 June after it was named "Lushan", carrying passengers on the intercity service form Nanchang to Jiujiang, taking around 1.5 hours for the journey, faster than the two hours by coach. This led to the increase of passenger train traffic, and the set became a symbol for the newer generation of trains that would serve the railways and it was featured on train tickets. The second set was completed by Tangshan Locomotive in November 1999, and handed over to Nanchang Bureau. However, due to the short period of development and testing, the service of these sets revealed multiple flaws, and they had a very poor reliability. Due to this, Nanchang Bureau only paid about 40% of the fees for the set (around CN¥240,000), with the rest being withheld due to the quality issues. After 1999, when Nanchang Bureau bought the more conventional but simpler to operate NYJ1 locomotive hauled passenger trains, the use of the NZJ sets was reduced to mainly running services during peak periods, such as the Chunyun period. Up until 2005, the NZJ still ran N621/622 from Nanchang to Yushan and N629/630, from Nanchang to Jingdezhen.

After 2006, the NZJ were stored at Nanchang depot. They were formally deregistered in August 2011, with tenders for the sale of the sets for scrapping being posted. Both sets were scrapped by the end of the year.

=== Derivative vehicles ===
A third NZJ set, designated NZJ_{1}-0002 was originally completed in March 2000 as part of an order of two from Jitong railway. However, for reasons unknown, the set was not accepted, and the order was switched to 25G carriages instead. It is also unknown whether the second car in the order was ever constructed. This set was eventually purchased by Kunming Railway Bureau and underwent a refurbishment at Tangshan Locomotive in August 2004, and was handed over in the first half of 2005, entering service in September.

Although the car was later designated with the prefix SWX (rail inspection vehicle), the equipment for it, such as infrared scanners, were never installed. It continued to run as a passenger vehicle in either intercity or tourist services, depending on the source although the set spent much of the time as a parked at Kunming depot. It underwent a repair at Kunming in April 2007.

The main differences of this third set was that instead of a all hard seat layout, it has a hard sleeper and a soft sleeper car, along with two hard seat cars. As it was ordered for a different bureau, the paint of the set is somewhat different. It also had a different bogie for the trailers and differences in the location of car doors.

This set did not serve long, exiting service in 2011, then formally withdrawn in 2012, and has been stored near Geyitou station since 2014.

== Technical features ==
=== Overall structure ===
The NZJ has a two motor, two trailer layout, with motor cars on either end and trailer cars in the middle. The layout of the motor car, from front to back is driver's cabin, motor room, passenger cabin and electrical cabin. Apart from the driver's door, all other doors are plug doors. The motor room houses the prime mover, fuel pumps, water tank, cooling equipment and other auxiliary equipment. The electrical cabin houses the control electronics, air conditioner equipment and controls and transformers. The two NZJ sets delivered to Nanchang Bureau are fitted with only 'hard' seats, which were arranged in a 2 by 3 layout. The trailer cars provides toilets, conductor's room, air conditioning controls. Batteries and 1200 litre fuel tanks are located on the trailer cars at the side closest to the motor car. The carriages are thin-walled structures without a central supporting beam, and are connected to each other with a size H15 tightlock coupler and imported rubber gangways. The motor cars have a streamlined fibreglass structure.

=== Traction system ===
Each motor car has an American Cummins QST30-G3 prime mover, which is a 12 cylinder, four stroke, water cooled, v-shaped high speed diesel engine. The cylinders have a diameter of 140 mm (5.5 in), a piston travel distance of 165 mm (6.5 in). It has a maximum traction force of 700 kW at 1500 rpm, though the installed power is 634 kW. The NZJ has an AC to DC transmission, with the diesel motor driving a three-phase AC generator, model 1FC5 406-4TA. This is then passed through a transformer and a rectifier, with the ZQDR-110 traction motors using DC power, which is speed regulated through changing voltage.

=== Control system ===
The NZJ used a Siemens S7-300 programmable controller for direct current, and the two motor cars are connected through a RS-485 standard cable, allowing both motors to be controlled at the same time through microcomputers.

=== Car formation ===
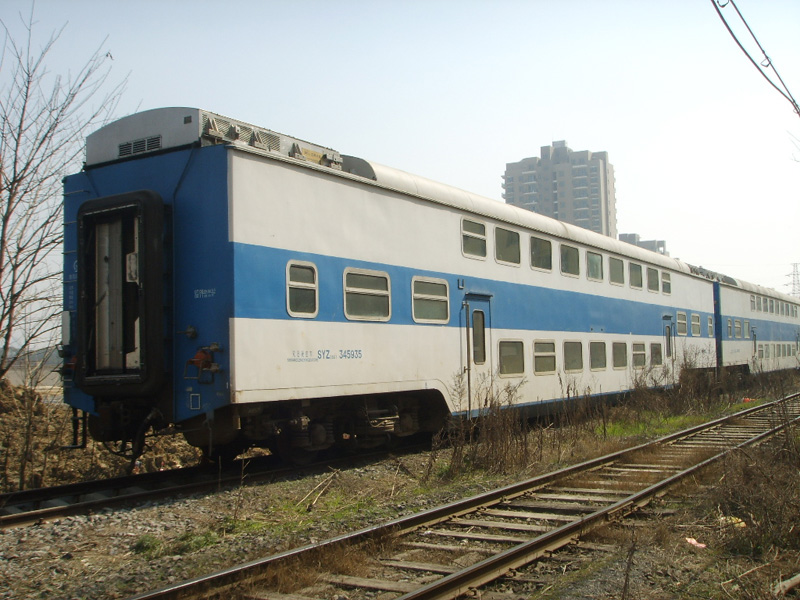
Car 2 of NZJ_{1}-0001

Position in set	1	2	3	4
Carriage numbers	NZJ-0001A SYZ_{25DD}345687	SYZ_{25DT}345685	SYZ_{25DT}345686	NZJ-0001B SYZ_{25DD}345688
Carriage numbers	NZJ_{1}-0001A SYZ_{25DD}345937	SYZ_{25DT}345935	SYZ_{25DT}345936	NZJ_{1}-0001B SYZ_{25DD}345688
Carriage numbers	NZJ_{1}-0002A SWX_{25DD}999213	SWX_{25DT}999214	SWX_{25DT}999215	NZJ_{1}-0002B SWX_{25DD}999212
Carriage type (for original pair)	Double deck 'hard' seat			
Carriage type (NZJ_{1}-0002)	Double deck 'hard' seat	Double deck 'hard' seat		Double deck 'soft' bed
Traction	●● ●●	〇〇 〇〇		●● ●●
Traction	Mc	T		Mc
Equipment	driver's cabin diesel generator traction motor	diesel fuel tank batteries toilet AV broadcasting station	diesel fuel tank batteries toilet snack shop	driver's cabin diesel generator traction motor
Max occupancy (for original pair)	102	166		102
Bogie (for original pair)	TW-160D	209PK		TW-160D
Bogie (NZJ_{1}-0002)	TW-160D	TW-200		TW-160D

=== Flaws ===
As an early DMU, the NZJ had numerous flaws that contributed to its prolonged periods out of service. As the controls for traction and electrical generation at both ends were linked to each other, the failure of one caused the other to fail as well, which resulted in the train becoming unmovable due to the loss of power. In summer, this meant the interior would heat up to high temperatures without the air conditioning, as the windows were not openable. Technological limitations meant that the self diagnosis system was not properly developed, and the low level of modularity and proprietary nature of the electrical system meant that the workers at Tangshan Locomotive often did not know how to solve the problems either. Although the design was technically not flawed, it had tolerances that were too low and there were insufficient spare parts available, and without a diagnosis system, it was hard to locate the source of the problem. Performing maintenance on the set was a difficult task, as height restrictions limit the size of the cars, worsened by the double deck design, meaning that the spaces between the bogie and car body were small. As a consequence, maintenance was hard to carry out.

== See also ==
- China Railway DDJ1, an experimental high-speed EMU designed in the same time period
- China Railway NZJ1 "New Dawn"
- China Railway NZJ2 "Shenzhou" / "Jinlun"
