= 2026 Urda train collision =

High-speed train collision in Toledo, Spain

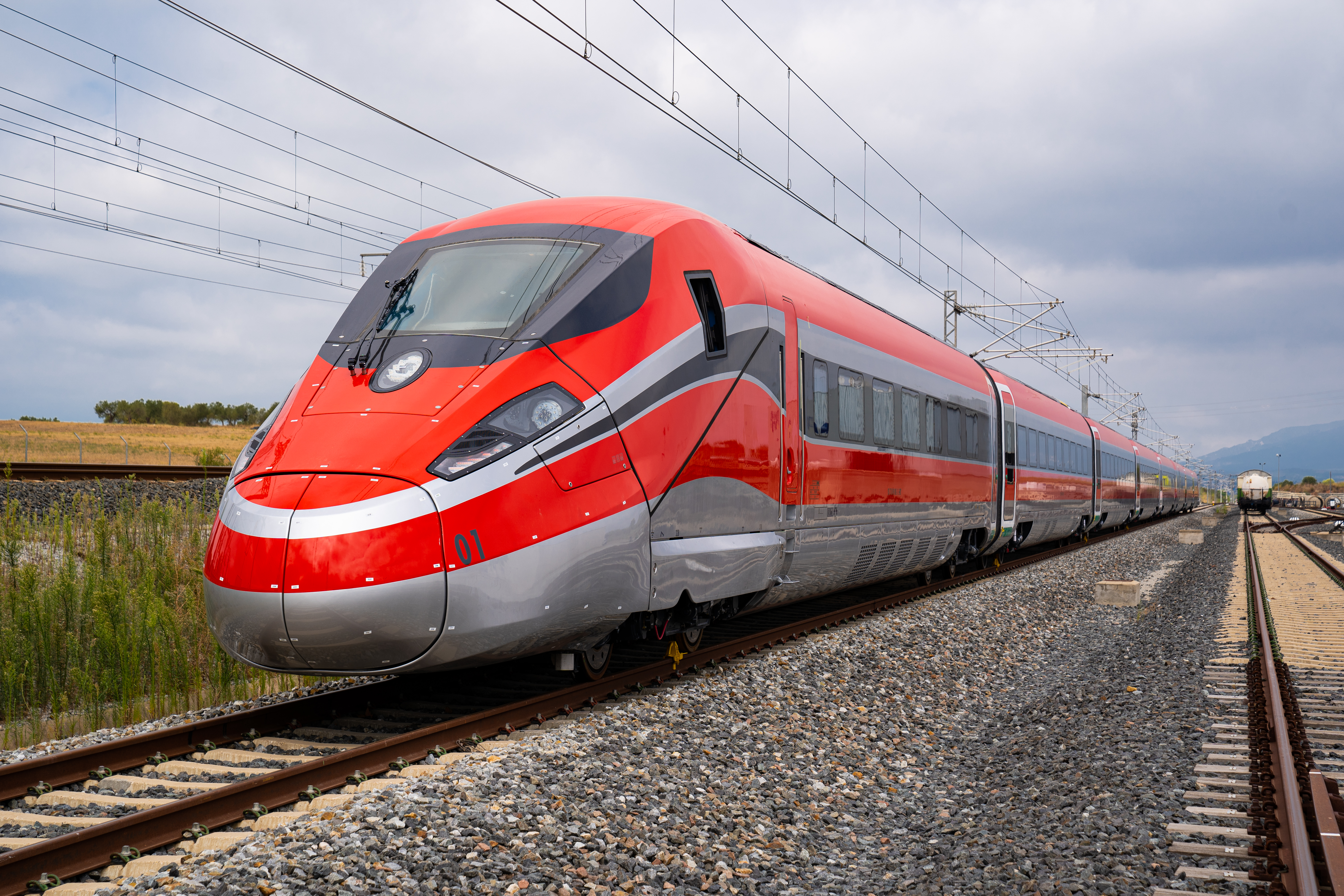
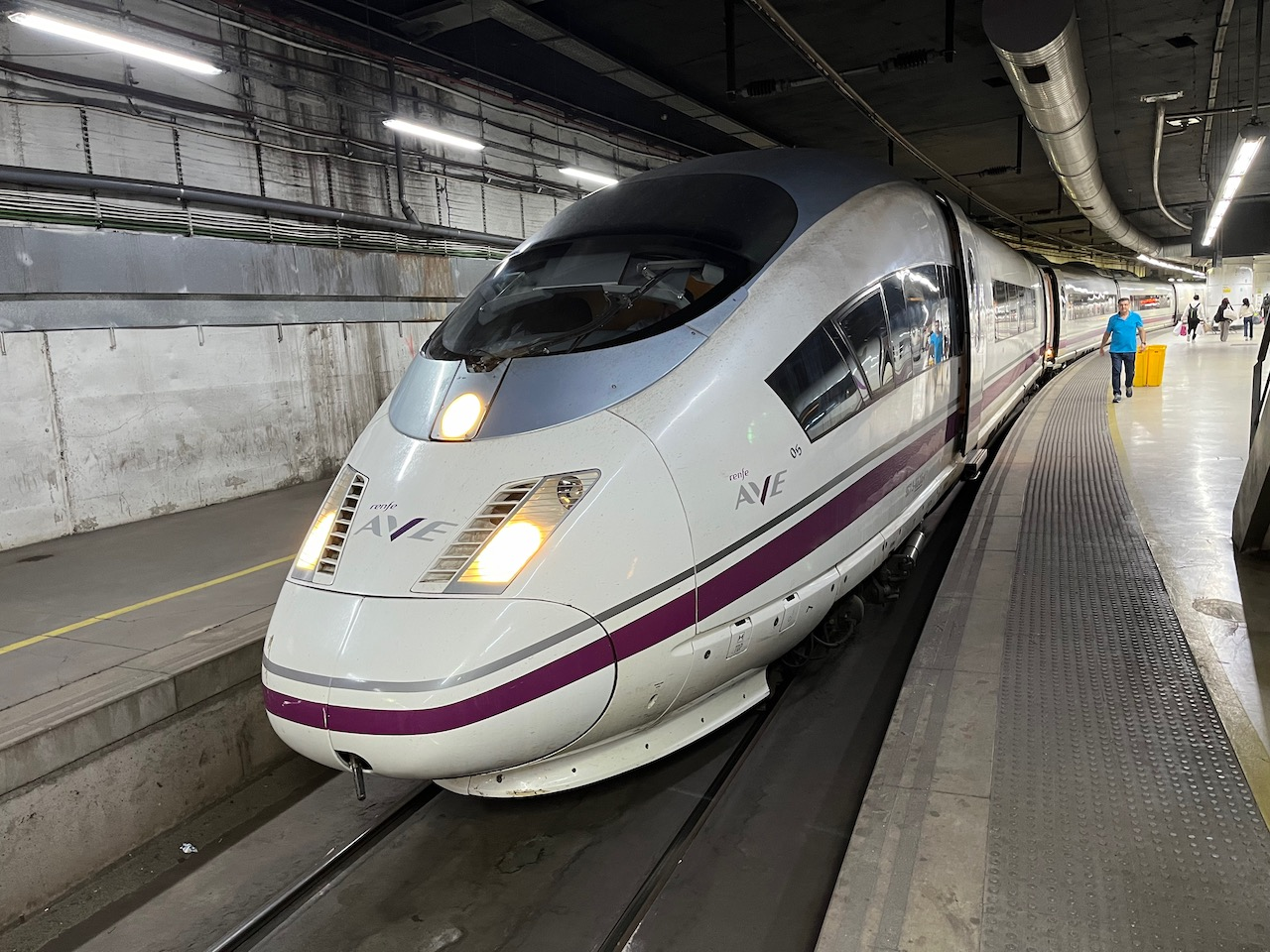
- An Iryo Frecciarossa 1000, the model of the first train A Renfe Class 103, the model of the second train
- Location of the collision in red

Details
- Date: 28 October 2026; 08:54:03 CET (07:54:03 UTC)
- Location: Los Yébenes, near Urda, Toledo
- Coordinates: 39°25′40″N 3°49′5″W
- Country: Spain
- Line: Madrid–Seville high-speed rail line
- Operator: Infrastructure: ADIF–Alta Velocidad; Trains: Renfe and ILSA ("Iryo")
- Incident type: Rear-end collision
- Cause: Under investigation

Statistics
- Trains: 2
- Passengers: 544
- Deaths: 69
- Injured: ~200

On 28 October 2026 at 08:54 CET (UTC+01:00), an AVE high-speed train collided end-on with a stationary Iryo high-speed train in the municipality of Los Yébenes close to the Urda passing and stabling point (PAET), on the Madrid–Seville high-speed rail line, killing 69 people and injuring over 200 more. Both trains were travelling from Atocha station in Madrid to Santa Justa station in Seville.

Government sources gave the likely cause of the crash as human error in the manual operation of signalling, after an automated system had failed.

== Background ==
The high-speed line between Madrid and Seville has two safety systems for the operation of trains, which are known by their initials: LZB and BSL. The LZB automatic signalling system controls train operation by monitoring train speed and location. It ensures that the train is respecting speed limits. LZB can automatically slow down or stop a train if the system detects a dangerous situation. When LZB stops working, the backup system BSL (Bloqueo de Señalización Lateral, or Lateral Signaling Block) is used. With BSL, train drivers must obey track-side signals and observe any speed restrictions. Both systems are automatic, but transition between them when LZB fails is not.

When it fails, LZB can still provide important instructions for train drivers in the form of numeric Meta codes that are displayed in the cab. Two Meta codes are noteworthy. Meta code 40 indicates that the train has lost LZB communication with the central computer, but the track in front of the train is clear and that the train may proceed at a speed no greater than 40 kilometres per hour (25 mph). Meta code 0 indicates that the train must immediately stop due to another train immediately ahead; however, the traffic controller could authorize the train driver to slowly proceed by sight (marcha a la vista) while being prepared to stop. Proceeding at normal speed (marcha normal) after Meta codes 0 or 40 would be dangerous.

Administrador de Infraestructuras Ferroviarias (ADIF) has a control centre where rail traffic controllers manage traffic and give instructions to train drivers. Two companies, RENFE and Iryo, operate high-speed trains along the line under the control of ADIF.

== Collision ==
At 07:54 CET (UTC+01:00), train 6076 operated by Iryo, using a Frecciarossa 1000 electric multiple unit, departed from Madrid Atocha railway station bound for Seville–Santa Justa railway station to the south, with 147 people on board. Six minutes later, at 08:00, AVE train 2080, using a Class 103 multiple unit, departed from the same station, also bound for Seville–Santa Justa, with 397 people on board.

At 08:30, LZB stopped working due to a computer problem, which caused all trains on a 64km section to stop. At this time, the AVE and Iryo trains were 25 kilometres (16 mi) apart. At 08:36, the ADIF controller advised the AVE train to resume normal running using BSL. Protocol required the train to proceed on sight at no more than 40 kilometres per hour (25 mph), given that there was an active stop signal along the line. However, the controller had not confirmed whether the line ahead was clear. A few minutes later the Iryo train was given similar instructions. At 8:41, the Iryo driver was having problems with BSL. At 8:48, the Iryo driver reported to the controller that her train was still stopped because she could not reset the LZB safety system. The controller asked the Iryo driver to call back when the problem was resolved.

At 08:54, the two trains collided at the 118 km marker near Urda, Toledo on the Madrid–Seville high-speed rail line.

The AVE train was travelling at 160–200 km/h (100–120 mph) when it collided with the rear of the stationary Iryo train. Some carriages fell down an embankment. A rail from the track lifted up and pierced a carriage, visibly protruding from it.

Diagram of the collision

The crash was the second major train disaster in Spain in 2026, following the Adamuz rail crash on the same line in January, which killed 46 people.

== Victims ==
Deaths by citizenship
Citizenship	Deaths
Spain	54
United States	4
Argentina	1
Australia	2
Japan	2
Canada	1
Czech Republic	1
France	1
Mexico	1 (Note: The victim also held American citizenship.)
Portugal	1
Tunisia	1
Total	69

Sixty-nine people were killed in the crash, including 54 Spanish citizens and 15 foreigners. The fatalities were 40 men and 29 women, all adults. More than 200 people were injured; 58 were hospitalised, including 15 in serious condition. One of the dead was hit by the rail that pierced a carriage, according to a surviving passenger.

Fátima Báñez, the former Minister of Employment and Social Security, was killed in the accident; she was in the last carriage of the Iryo train. Other victims included classical music composer Marisa Manchado, athlete Julieta Gallego, bullfighting agent Antonio Vázquez, Cambridge University associate professor in molecular biology Marta Shahbazi, journalist Raúl Triguero, and the father of the actor César Vicente. One surviving passenger had also been aboard during the Adamuz crash in January 2026, having come out physically uninjured both times.

The Renfe train driver, Antonio Acedo, also died in the crash despite his having applied the emergency brakes upon seeing the Iryo train. Acedo had previously and repeatedly pointed out the lack of maintenance and the neglect of railway infrastructure, denouncing:

the shortcomings, the overloading of users following the failed liberalization, the blatant lack of funds for maintenance, and the neglect over all these years—all of which have led to an appalling deterioration of the railway infrastructure.

Two Iryo crew members, Carlos López and Nelson Bernardino, also died in the crash.

== Aftermath ==
Information phone numbers, on Seville–Santa Justa railway station screens, for victims' relatives

Local residents attended the scene, providing water and assisting the injured. Eight firefighting personnel and eight emergency response units were the first at the scene. Additional crew from the Andalusian Health Service, the City Council of Madrid, and SAMUR were also dispatched. The Regional Government of Castilla–La Mancha and the Military Emergencies Unit were also on alert. Three helicopters and two mobile intensive care units were dispatched to the scene. The Spanish Civil Guard deployed more than 900 personnel to the crash site and established bureaus in Madrid, Toledo, Seville and Córdoba to investigate reports of missing persons. Blood donation points were set up in Castilla–La Mancha and Madrid. High-speed services between Madrid and Andalusia were suspended.

== Investigation ==
Government sources indicated that human error by an operator at the Administrador de Infraestructuras Ferroviarias (ADIF) was the probable cause of the accident.

The Independent Authority for the Technical Investigation of Accidents and Incidents (AITAT) is responsible for investigating railway accidents in Spain. It opened an investigation into the accident.

A recording of the communications between the ADIF control centre and the trains was leaked to the media. Óscar Puente, the Minister of Transport and Sustainable Mobility, went to ADIF's control centre in Atocha to learn the details of the incident. He described it as "inexplicable" that ADIF's control centre authorised the AVE high-speed train to resume normal operation when the Iryo train was still stationary in front of it. Despite the unfolding events being visible on screens at the Madrid control center, the order to stop the train was never given.

== Reactions ==
European flags at half-mast on 28 October

Memorial in the Seville–Santa Justa railway station on 31 October

Spanish prime minister Pedro Sánchez released a statement that he was in contact with Puente and the president of Castilla-La Mancha, Emiliano García-Page, and that "all [his] thoughts are with the victims and their families". King Felipe VI and Queen Letizia also issued a statement sending their "heartfelt support to the injured and all those affected". Three days of national mourning were declared by Sánchez, who also visited the crash site. Flags at the offices of the European Commission, the Council of the European Union and the European Parliament were also set to half-mast in solidarity over the disaster. Several world leaders expressed their solidarity with Spain, including French Emmanuel Macron, Italian Giorgia Meloni, Ukrainian Volodymyr Zelenskyy, Mexican Claudia Sheinbaum, Armenian Nikol Pashinyan, German Friedrich Merz, Lithuanian Gitanas Nausėda and Portuguese Luís Montenegro, as well as European Union leaders and Secretary-General of the United Nations António Guterres.

The Spanish Union of Railway Drivers initiated protests and demanded the adoption of measures to prevent trains from resuming normal operation in situations where more than one train is present in the same railway block section and the railway signaling systems fail. Concerns were also raised regarding the excessive workload faced by staff monitoring the trains, due to a shortage of personnel at Adif’s Traffic Regulation Center.

All 24 Copa del Rey first-round matches scheduled for 28 October were postponed by the Royal Spanish Football Federation (RFEF) as a mark of respect for the victims of the collision. All political parties except the far-right party Vox suspended campaigning ahead of the forthcoming general election. Santiago Abascal, the leader of Vox, stated, "We will not accept a period of mourning that silences us while Spaniards are dying."

A demonstration held the night of 28 October at the Transport Ministry building in Madrid was attended by around 1,500 people. Protesters demanded the resignation of Sánchez and Puente before being dispersed by police with tear gas after demonstrators hurled bottles and flares.

On 31 October, a memorial mass was held in Urda to honor the victims of the crash, attended by residents and officials. Several moments of silence were held across the country, by members of the public, emergency workers and transit staff. During the mass, a letter from Pope Leo XIV addressed to the victims was read out.

Following the collision, European Union prosecutors began investigations into the possible fraudulent misuse of funds intended to go towards upgrading the signalling system on the line.

=== Óscar Puente ===
Óscar Puente, Spain's Minister of Transport and Sustainable Mobility, stated that rear-end collisions like the one in Toledo are "highly unlikely". He also ruled out resigning and expressed concern about the personal "ordeal" he was about to face.

On 30 October, Ada Colau, the leader of the Broad Front – which includes the minor partner of the government coalition, Sumar – called for the resignation of Puente, saying he had the "political responsibility" to do so.

Puente announced his resignation and his departure from politics on 3 November, stating that "a transport minister in a country like Spain cannot remain in office after two accidents of this seriousness in less than a year", referring also to the Adamuz train crash in January of the same year.

== See also ==
- List of rail accidents (2020–present)
- List of rail accidents in Spain
- 2026 Gelida train derailment, another deadly train incident in Spain in 2026
