= SEMAF =

SEMAF is an initialism which may mean

- Sindicato Español de Maquinistas y Ayudantes Ferroviarios, a Spanish railway trades union
- Société Générale Egyptienne de Matériel de Chemins de Fer - an Egyptian rolling stock manufacturer
- Société d'Exploitation du Matériel Aéronautique Français - a defunct French airline
