= Iryo =

High-speed rail operator in Spain

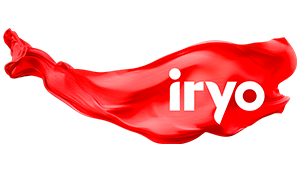

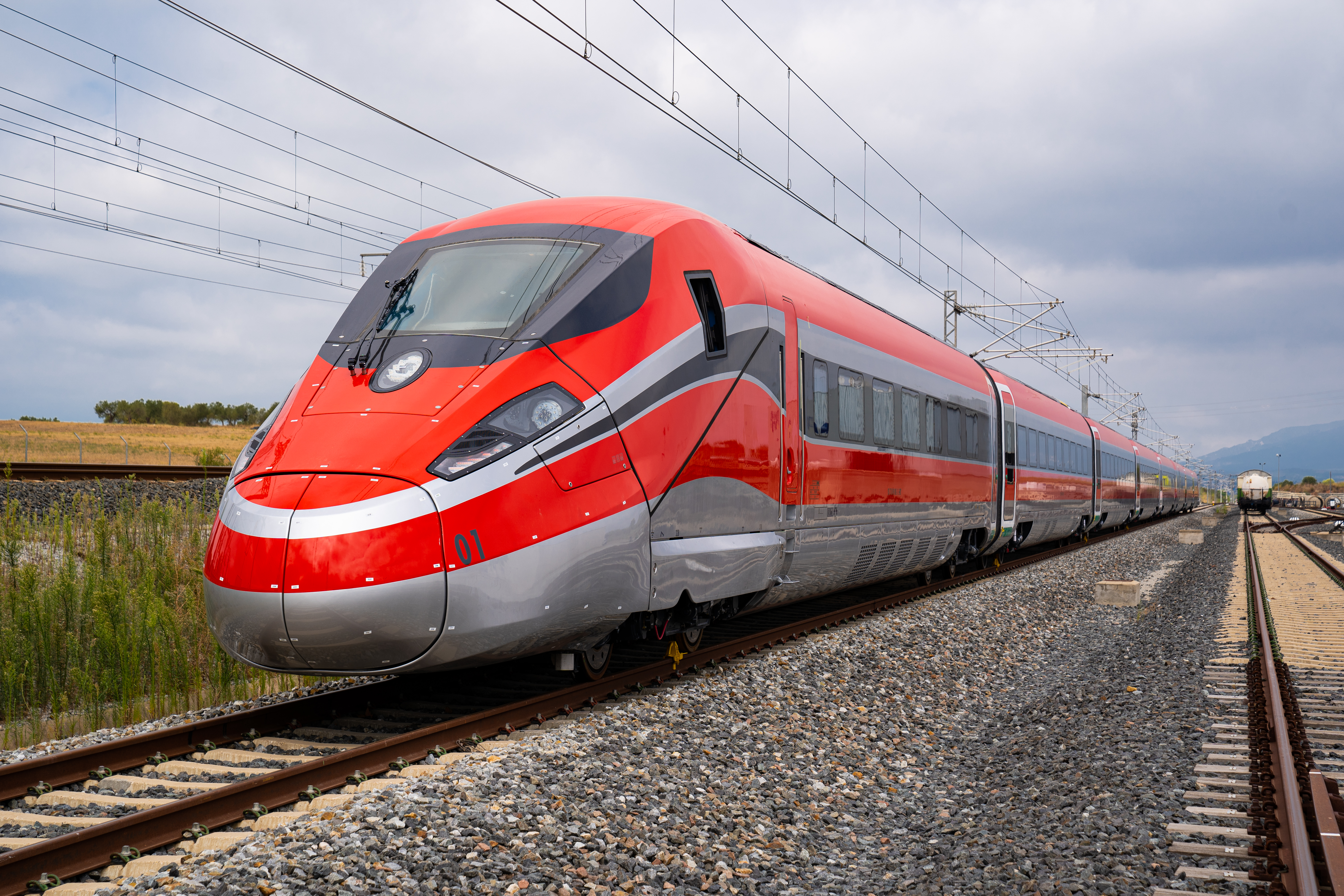
- Main stations: Madrid Atocha, Barcelona Sants
- Other station: Zaragoza–Delicias
- Fleet: 20 Frecciarossa 1000
- Stations called at: 12
- Parent company: Trenitalia (51%); Air Nostrum (25%); Globalvia (24%)

Technical
- Track gauge: 1,435 mm (4 ft 8 1/2 in) standard gauge
- Electrification: Overhead line, 25 kV 50 Hz AC

Other
- Website: iryo.eu
Route map
Current and planned services

Iryo is the brand of Intermodalidad de Levante S.A. (ILSA), a private high-speed rail operator in Spain. The company is jointly owned by the Italian state-owned railway company Trenitalia (51%), the Spanish regional airline Air Nostrum (25%), and the Spanish infrastructure investment fund Globalvia (24%).

During the late 2010s, ILSA worked to secure the necessary approval and resources to launch the service. During early 2022, it was announced that the company had attracted the interest of Globalvia, which subsequently joined with the two original founding companies in the venture. The Iryo brand was launched in November 2021, one year prior to the commencement of its first services, which ran on the Madrid–Barcelona high-speed rail line in competition with Renfe and Ouigo España. Throughout 2023, additional services covering Madrid–Córdoba–Seville/Málaga and Madrid–Albacete–Alicante have been launched. The company has publicly declared its intention to pursue a 30 percent market share along its routes. The bulk of Iryo's fleet comprises 20 Frecciarossa 1000 high speed train sets.

== History ==
On 17 September 2018, Intermodalidad de Levante S.A. (ILSA) received approval to launch an open-access high-speed passenger services in Spain; at the time, the company was a joint venture between the Italian state-owned railway company Trenitalia and the Spanish airline Air Nostrum. On 18 November 2021, ILSA revealed the Iryo brand at a public event held at Madrid Atocha railway station. According to Simone Gorini, ILSA's chief executive, the operator has a long-term ambition to pursue a 30 percent market share on the routes that it is to run.

During February 2022, it was reported that the Spanish infrastructure investment fund Globalvia was interested in acquiring a stake in Intermodalidad de Levante (ILSA), the high-speed joint venture between Trenitalia and Air Nostrum. In September 2022, Globalvia announced the completion of its acquisition of a 24 percent stake in ILSA and thereby its involvement in Iryo.

In late November 2022, Iryo inaugurated its initial service, running 12 trains per day on the route between Madrid and Barcelona; these sometimes called at Zaragoza. Its services are operated in competition with the national railway operator Renfe's AVE and Avlo services, as well as the French-owned low-cost carrier Ouigo España; thus, Spain became the first country in Europe with three competing high-speed rail operators. Two months prior to the launch, Iryo had made available advanced tickets at a 50 percent discount available; ticket prices across all operators have been cut since the launch of operations.

Iryo added a Madrid–Cuenca–Valencia route in December 2022. In February 2023, it was announced that the company had been authorised to launch four more routes. Accordingly, additional services covering Madrid–Córdoba–Seville/Málaga were launched in March 2023; three months later, a Madrid–Albacete–Alicante service commenced as well. It has been observed that, following the arrival of open-access operators such as Iryo and Ouigo España, passenger numbers have sharply risen, reportedly doubling on the Madrid-València corridor during late 2022.

During June 2023, it was announced that Iryo had formed an alliance with the Spanish airline Air Europa to facilitate the provision of combined plane and train tickets to the travelling public. The company's ambitions to expand its services have been aided by liberalisation reforms pursued by the Spanish railway infrastructure manager Administrador de Infraestructuras Ferroviarias (ADIF), such as the introduction of scalable track access charges that will be fairly applied to all operators, both the state-own Renfe and open-access operators such as Iryo, during the mid-2020s.

For rolling stock, the company ordered twenty new Frecciarossa 1000 train sets, similar to those operated by Trenitalia since 2015. Nine of these had been delivered prior to the launch of services to Barcelona. During late 2022, it was speculated that the company may in the future acquire variable-gauge trains, which would enable Iryo to provide services to areas, such as in Galicia, which are presently accessible only via Iberian-gauge tracks.

== Accidents and incidents ==
An Iryo train on the Madrid–Málaga high-speed rail line was involved in a derailment and crash on 18 January 2026. The Iryo train collided with a Renfe train in Adamuz, resulting in 46 deaths. Spain's Transport Minister Óscar Puente said the train that jumped the track was less than four years old.

On 28 October 2026, an AVE train collided with an Iryo train near Urda, Toledo, causing two wagons to derail and causing at least 69 deaths.

== Services ==
As of 2024, Iryo offers the following services:

- Madrid Atocha–Barcelona via Zaragoza–Delicias and Tarragona.
- Madrid Atocha–Seville via Córdoba.
- Madrid Atocha–Málaga via Córdoba.
- Madrid Chamartín–Valencia via Cuenca.
- Madrid Chamartín–Alicante via Cuenca and Albacete.

== See also ==
- High-speed rail in Spain
