= Óscar Puente =

Spanish politician (born 1968)

The Most Excellent Óscar Puente
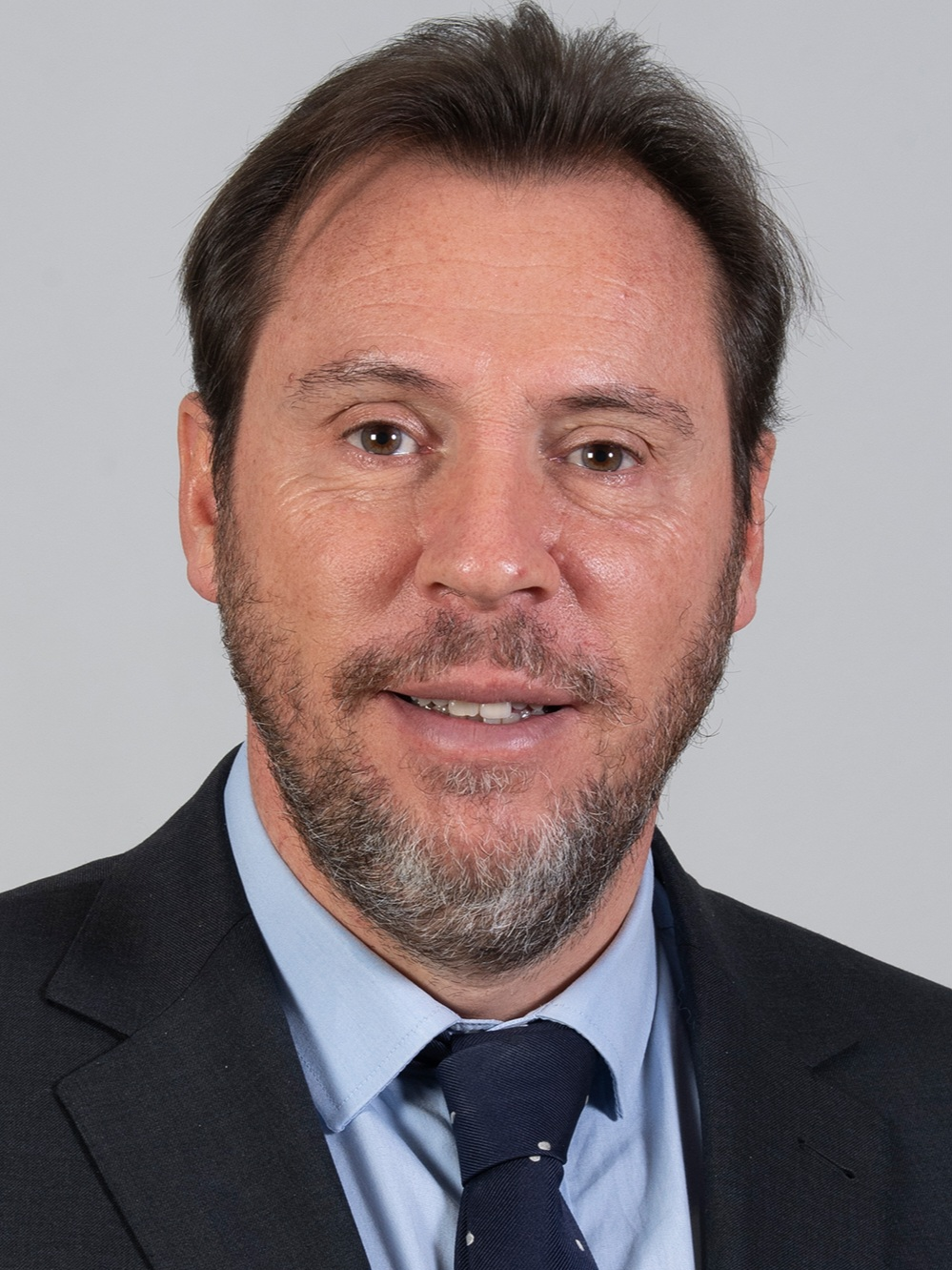
- Official portrait, 2023

Minister of Transport and Sustainable Mobility of Spain
- In office 21 November 2023 – 4 November 2026
- Monarch: Felipe VI
- Prime Minister: Pedro Sánchez
- Preceded by: Raquel Sánchez Jiménez
- Succeeded by: Carlos Cuerpo (acting)

Mayor of Valladolid
- In office 13 June 2015 – 17 June 2023
- Preceded by: Francisco Javier León de la Riva
- Succeeded by: Jesús Julio Carnero

Member of the Congress of Deputies
- Incumbent
- Assumed office 17 August 2023
- Constituency: Valladolid
Additional positions
Spokesman of the Federal Executive of the Spanish Socialist Workers' Party
In office 18 June 2017 – 17 October 2021
Preceded by	Mario Jiménez Díaz
Succeeded by	Felipe Sicilia
President of the Socialist Group in the City Council of Valladolid
In office 11 July 2008 – 13 June 2015
Preceded by	Soraya Rodríguez
Succeeded by	Pedro Herrero
Councillor in the City Council of Valladolid
In office 16 June 2007 – 20 November 2023

Personal details
- Born: Óscar Puente Santiago; 15 November 1968 (age 57) Valladolid, Spain
- Party: PSOE
- Spouse: Laura Soria Velasco
- Children: 3
- Education: University of Valladolid
- Occupation: Politician, lawyer
- Website: www.oscarpuente.es

Óscar Puente Santiago (Spanish: [ˈoskaɾ ˈpwente]; born 15 November 1968) is a Spanish Socialist Workers' Party (PSOE) politician who served as Minister of Transport and Sustainable Mobility between 2023 and his resignation after the deadly train accidents of Adamuz and Urda in 2026. He served as a city councillor in Valladolid from 2007 to 2023 and as the city's mayor from 2015 to 2023.

== Early life ==
Born in Valladolid, Puente was the son and grandson of socialists. He achieved a master's degree in Political Management in 1992 and a Law degree from the University of Valladolid a year later. After two years of internship, he began practicing law in 1995.

== Political career ==
=== Local politics ===
Active in the Spanish Socialist Workers' Party (PSOE) from 1990, he began working for the party as a General Vice Secretary in the provincial executive in 2004, having secretary-general four years earlier. Elected to Valladolid City Council in 2007, he replaced Soraya Rodríguez as party spokesperson in the city hall the following year, and in 2009 became secretary general of the PSOE in the city.

In September 2010, Puente was endorsed by the PSOE at local and provincial level to be their mayoral candidate in Valladolid in the 2011 Spanish local elections. In the elections in May, People's Party (PP) incumbent Francisco Javier León de la Riva took a majority and rose from 15 seats to 17, while the PSOE fell from 13 to 9. In the 2015 local elections, the PSOE had eight seats, and with the support of the seven seats held by local left-wing parties, they gained the majority to make him mayor and end the 20-year tenure of León de la Riva.

In a municipal session in June 2018, Puente questioned the management skills of Citizens spokesperson Pilar Vicente by pointing out that she used to work as a store assistant at a shopping centre. Citizens leader Albert Rivera accused Puente of classism and male chauvinism over the remark, calling for him to resign. Puente said that he was referring to what he believed to be falsehoods in Vicente's curriculum vitae, and that Rivera had exaggerated the episode.

In the 2023 local elections, Puente's party took 11 of 27 seats, the same as the PP of Jesús Julio Carnero, though the PSOE received marginally more votes. Carnero was able to form a majority government with the three councillors of Vox, becoming mayor.

=== Minister of Transport ===
In the 2023 Spanish general election, Puente was the PSOE's lead candidate in the Valladolid constituency of the Congress of Deputies. After being elected, he was appointed Minister of Transport and Sustainable Mobility; he had previously been offered the post while mayor but turned it down. He previously referred to the Catalan independence movement as a "sect" and likened its leader Carles Puigdemont to Charles Manson; after being appointed to government, Puente defended the amnesty for Catalan independence leaders as an act of reconciliation. Puente served as minister during the 2024 Spain floods.

In May 2024, a diplomatic row erupted between Spain and Argentina after Puente suggested that Argentina's president Javier Milei had used drugs during his election campaign the year prior. In response, Milei released a statement condemning the "slander and insults" against him, and accusing prime minister Pedro Sánchez's policies of having brought "death and poverty" to Spaniards. In turn, Spain's Ministry of Foreign Affairs rejected Milei's statement as "unfounded".

In July 2025 Puente faced controversy for online comments that incorrectly referred to French Jewish students as "Israeli brats" following their disputed removal from a Spanish flight. Puente suggested that Israel was responsible for the 2026 Ceuta migrant crisis.

Puente (centre) and President of Andalusia Juanma Moreno (in dark coat, right) at the site of the 2026 Adamuz rail disaster

In 2026, the Adamuz and Toledo high-speed rail disasters caused the deaths of over 100 people. When asked if he would resign, Puente replied "Right now what I'm thinking about is clarifying this and trying to resolve it, I'm not thinking about myself". He also expressed concern about the personal ‘ordeal’ he was about to face. Following the escalation of the controversy surrounding the Toledo train accident, he announced his resignation as minister and as candidate to the 2026 Spanish general election on 3 November.

Puente was a controversial minister, as he used Twitter to insult journalists and opposition politicians. He also commissioned a study through the ministry to compile the nicknames he was being called on that platform. A survey carried out by the Centre for Sociological Research in 2024 showed him to be the least popular minister.

== Personal life ==
Puente was married to judge Laura Soria Velasco, with whom he has two daughters. His daughter Carmen took part on the sixth season of La Voz Kids in 2021, reaching the semi-finals. After his divorce, he began a relationship with Yasmina Gregori, with whom he has a son born in 2025.

A practicing Catholic, Puente is a friend of the archbishop of Valladolid, Luis Argüello. He said in 2020 that he felt like a "fish out of water" for being a Catholic in a left-wing party.
