= 2026 Adamuz rail disaster =

Crash of trains on parallel tracks in Córdoba, Spain

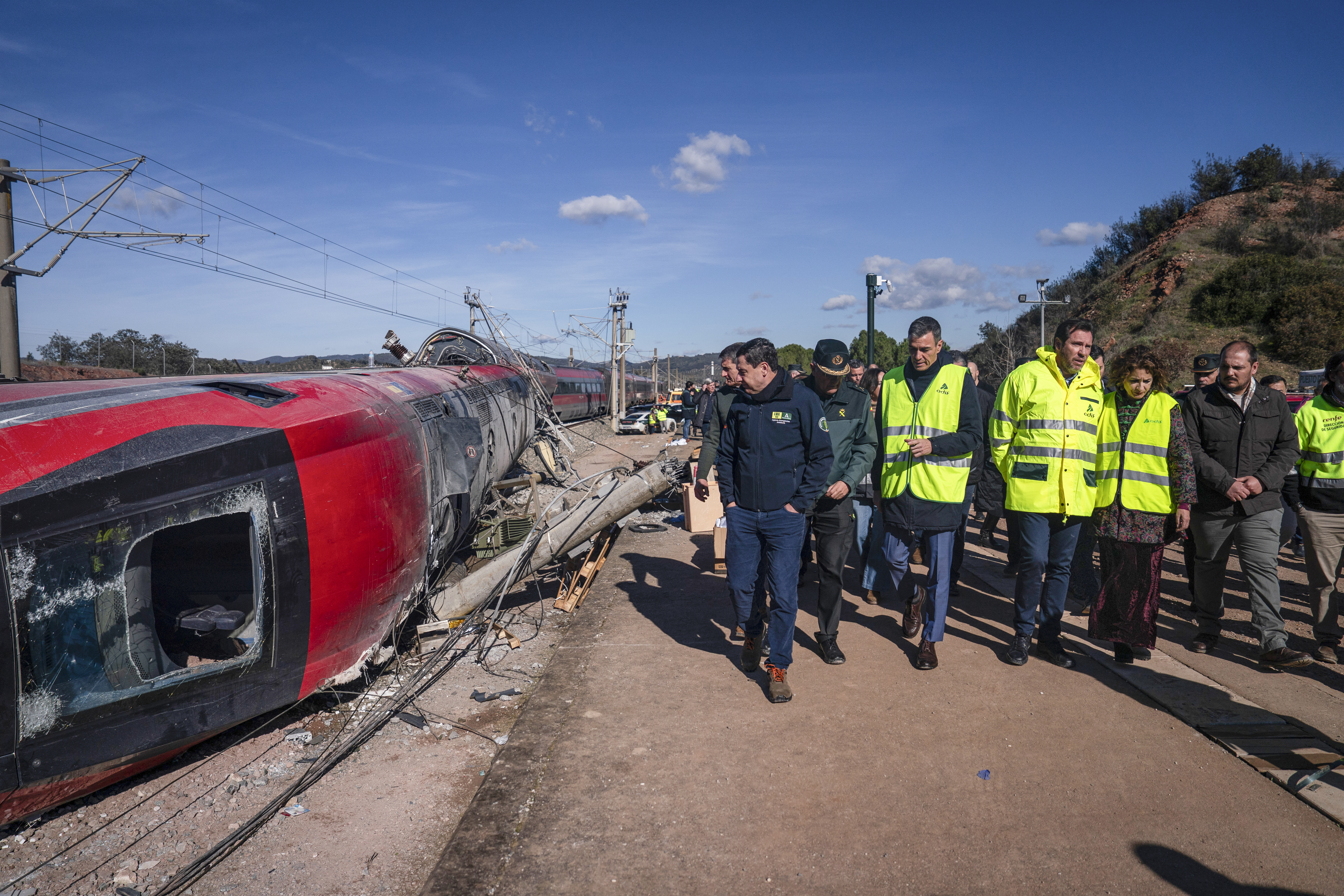
- Prime Minister Pedro Sánchez and government officials inspecting the disaster site during an official visit

Details
- Date: 18 January 2026; 19:43 CET
- Location: Adamuz, Córdoba
- Coordinates: 38°0′56″N 4°33′47″W
- Country: Spain
- Line: Madrid–Seville high-speed rail line
- Operator: Renfe & ILSA
- Owner: ADIF–Alta Velocidad
- Incident type: Derailment, collision
- Cause: Transverse weld failure (under investigation) (Note: Many early articles erroneously claimed the accident was caused by a 40-centimetre break in the rail. This is false. The 40-centimetre break in the rail occurred after the derailment began; it was not the cause of the derailment)

Statistics
- Trains: Two high-speed trains: Iryo train 6189, Frecciarossa 1000, trainset 109-012; Renfe train 2384, Renfe Class 120, trainset 120.061
- Passengers: 478 (Note: 294 on the Iryo, 184 on the Renfe)
- Deaths: 46
- Injured: 292

On 18 January 2026, an Iryo high-speed train derailed in the municipality of Adamuz, in the province of Córdoba, Spain. A second train, Renfe Alvia 2384, crashed into it and was also derailed. The incident killed 46 people, including the Renfe train driver, and injured 292 others, 15 critically. The crash was Spain's worst railway disaster since the Santiago de Compostela derailment in 2013, and was the fourth deadliest railway accident in Spain until 10 months later, when at least 69 people died in the October 2026 Urda train collision. A preliminary investigation by the Civil Guard found that a poor weld with an improper kit had caused rail breakage, and was compounded by poor data collection practices, inexperienced track inspectors, and overly relaxed programming of track circuit-connected alert systems. The line reopened for service on 17 February 2026 after a month of repairs and testing.

== Background ==
The Madrid–Seville high-speed rail line has been operational since 1992. Since 2014, the line has been operated by the state-owned infrastructure operator ADIF–Alta Velocidad. Renfe-Operadora, Spain's state-owned national train operator, was created in 2005 as a successor to the long-established Red Nacional de los Ferrocarriles Españoles. ILSA, a rail company majority-owned by Trenitalia, was founded in 2019, and began offering services in Andalusia in 2023 under the brand Iryo.

The Sindicato Español de Maquinistas y Ayudantes Ferroviarios (SEMAF), a train drivers' union, warned ADIF in August 2025 of heavy wear and tear on tracks, including where the derailments happened. This included potholes, bumps, and imbalances in overhead power lines that were causing frequent breakdowns and damaging ‍the trains. Allegedly, no action was taken despite the warnings. This came within the context of a perceived decline in ADIF's responsiveness to infrastructure maintenance even amid a surge in demand; one report from May 2025 noted that compensation from ADIF increased despite it receiving €6.9 billion for capital funds from the European Union over the past year, while another published six days after the crash showed that ADIF consistently prioritised spending on new infrastructure over maintenance of existing infrastructure (which received 16% of ADIF's budget, half the share of peer countries' spends), with multiple think tanks pointing out that despite a 58% increase in rail infrastructure spending since 2018, gross investment adjusted for inflation was still a third of its peak in 2008.

High-speed trains between Madrid and Andalusia have experienced frequent delays since 2022. At least 18 incidents have been reported on the tracks over the past three years, from signalling failures to issues with overhead lines. Spain's high-speed network is particularly vulnerable to cable thefts, as it crosses large swathes of sparsely populated countryside.

== Derailment ==
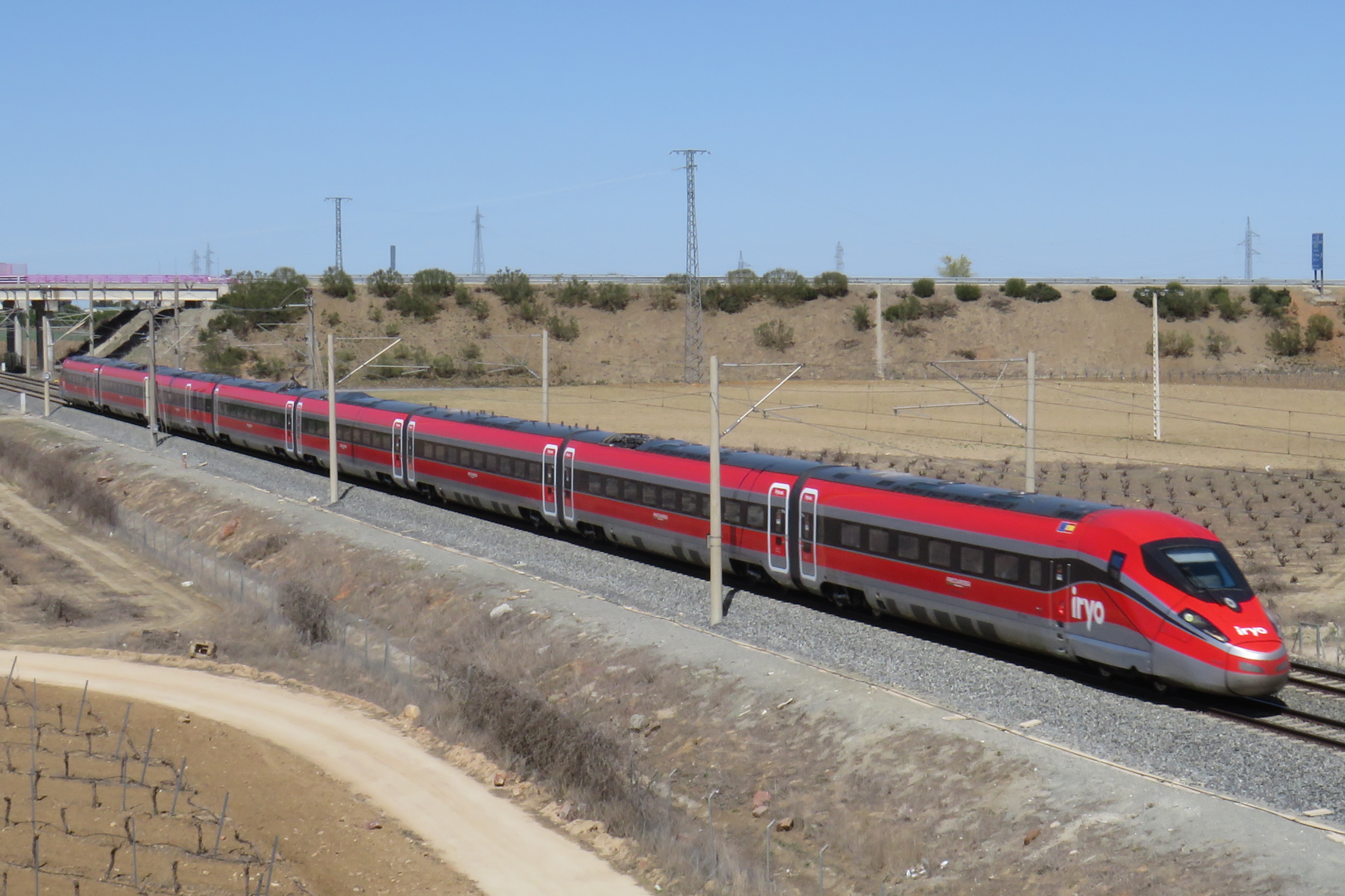
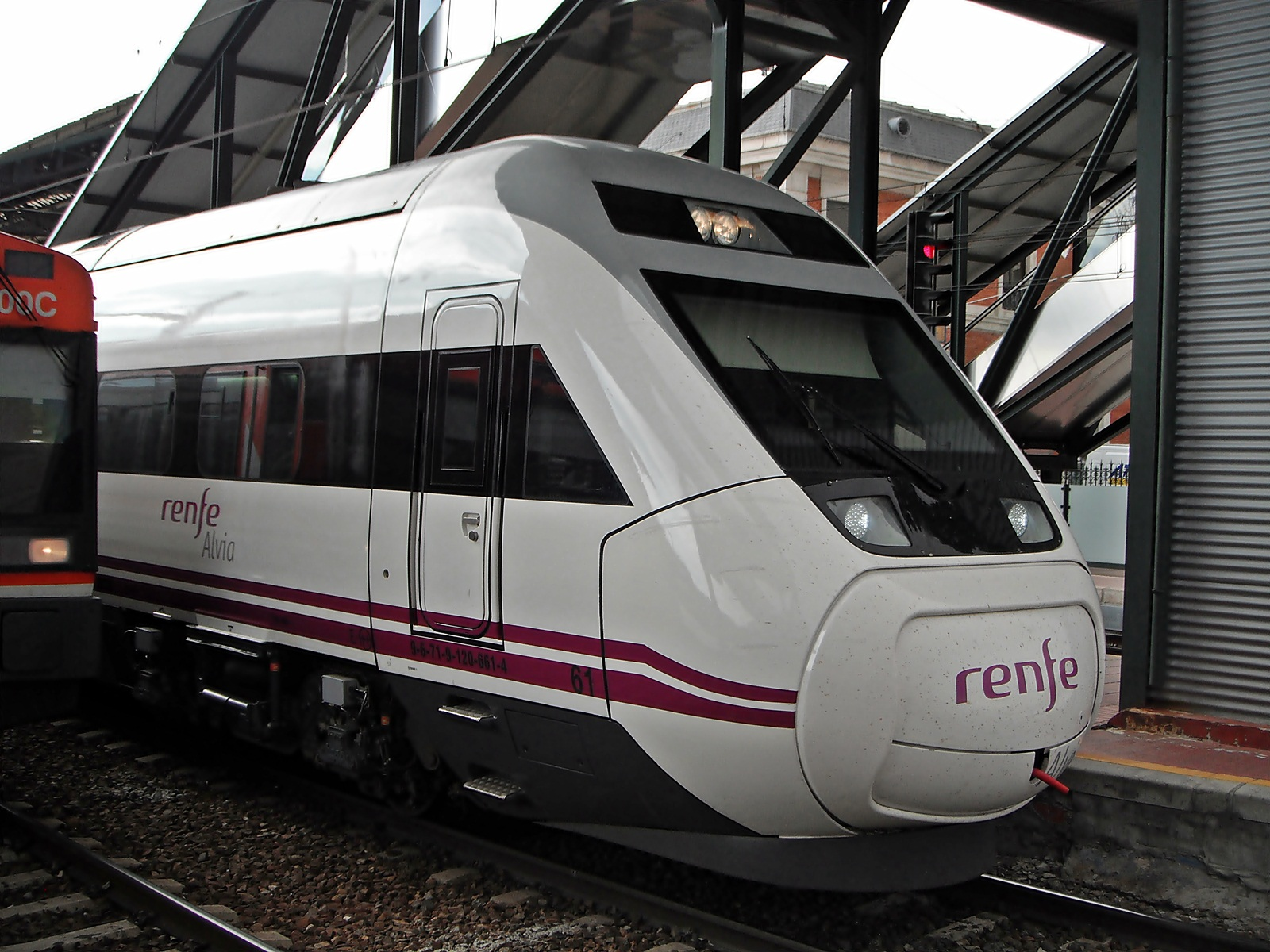
An Iryo high-speed train (top) similar to the one involed in the crash and the Renfe Class 120 train (bottom) involved in this crash years before at Valladolid Station.

The eight-car Iryo 6189, trainset 109-012, had departed Málaga María Zambrano station for Madrid Atocha station at 18:40 CET, while the four-car Renfe train, Alvia 2384, operated by trainset 120-061, had departed Madrid Atocha at 18:05 bound for Huelva–Las Metas station in Huelva. The Iryo train, travelling northbound with 289 passengers and 5 crew members on board, left its scheduled stop at Córdoba–Julio Anguita station at approximately 19:39.

At 19:43, passing through the municipality of Adamuz, its three rear carriages derailed and invaded the opposite parallel (southbound) track, while the front of the train continued on the original (northbound) track. The Renfe train, travelling southbound on the parallel track with 184 people on board, collided with the derailed Iryo train about 20 seconds later and also derailed. The Renfe train sustained more severe damage, with its first two carriages falling down a 4 m (13 ft) embankment.

The derailment occurred on a straight section of track that was last refurbished in May 2025. Both trains were travelling within the 250 km/h (160 mph) speed limit on the track. Access to the site of the derailments was through a single-lane road, complicating rescue and recovery operations.

== Victims ==
The crash killed 46 people and injured 292 others. Among those killed in the crash was the driver of the Renfe train. The fatalities were 23 women, 22 men and a 12-year-old boy. Three foreign citizens from Germany, Morocco and Russia were among the dead.

Of the injured, 170 were treated for minor injuries and 122 others, including 15 in critical condition, were transported to the hospital. By the following day, 79 people had been discharged.

Efforts were also made to find a missing dog that was traveling on the Iryo train with its owners. The dog was found alive on 22 January by forest firefighters.

== Investigation ==
Óscar Puente, the Minister of Transport and Sustainable Mobility, described the crash as "tremendously strange". He said that it occurred on a section of track consisting of "a straight line" that was renovated in May 2025, and that €700 million had been invested in that section of track, which was "supposedly in perfect condition". The Iryo train that derailed was described as "relatively new": it was manufactured in 2022 and passed its last safety inspection on 15 January 2026.

According to the preliminary report published by the CIAF (Commission for the Investigation of Railway Accidents) on 23 January 2026, the investigation is focused on a faulty weld that lay in between two sleepers. As the weight of the train depressed the section of rail including the weld downwards, the weld failed, creating a vertical "step" that the wheels struck. The failed weld combined with the impact forces eventually led to a 40-centimetre section of rail separating entirely. Investigators inspecting the wheels of the Iryo cars that did not derail observed a specific pattern of damage:

- Only the right wheels (looking in the direction of the traffic) were damaged.
- On cars 2, 3 and 4, wheels belonging to the first wheelset of each bogie bore marks consistent with hitting a "cliff" in the rail at the point where it was broken.
- Wheels belonging to the second wheelset of bogies had no marks, because the weight of the first wheelset had depressed the rail forward of the break, temporarily making it flush again with the section before the break. Investigators estimated the time between two wheelsets passing at the relevant speed as 30 milliseconds, insufficient for the rail to spring back.
- On car 5, the pattern differed from the previous one, with impact marks visibly displaced toward the wheel's edge. Investigators hypothesize the rail had started to rotate outward.
- Car 6 was the first to derail. The wheels of the derailed carriages were found too damaged by impact with ballast to immediately interpret.

A section of rail was found after the crash to bear marks on its side, described as consistent with one or more wheels having passed on it as it lay sideways. Three trains had travelled along the line before the derailment occurred. All three sustained damage to their wheelsets.

In April 2026, the Civil Guard released an investigative report into some of the broader causes behind the rail failure. The report found that the track circuit voltage dropped from the nominal 2 volts to 1.5 volts at 21:46 the previous night, but the detectors did not trigger an alert system because its threshold was set at 0.78 volts; while this contravenes ADIF regulations that specify that any such voltage drop cause an alarm, ADIF did not extend their enforcement of the regulations to high-speed rail lines. A track inspection two months prior to the accident also registered a small vertical acceleration, but it was ignored. The investigators found that some of the track inspectors did not meet ADIF's two years' experience requirement for the line, and the handheld track detector machines did not have a digital data upload capability, contributing to issues with data collection. The investigators stated the focus has now shifted to investigating the types of welding kits used on the line and the possibility that the rail segment used one not included in ADIF regulations, with results noting additional inconsistencies in data collection.

== Aftermath ==
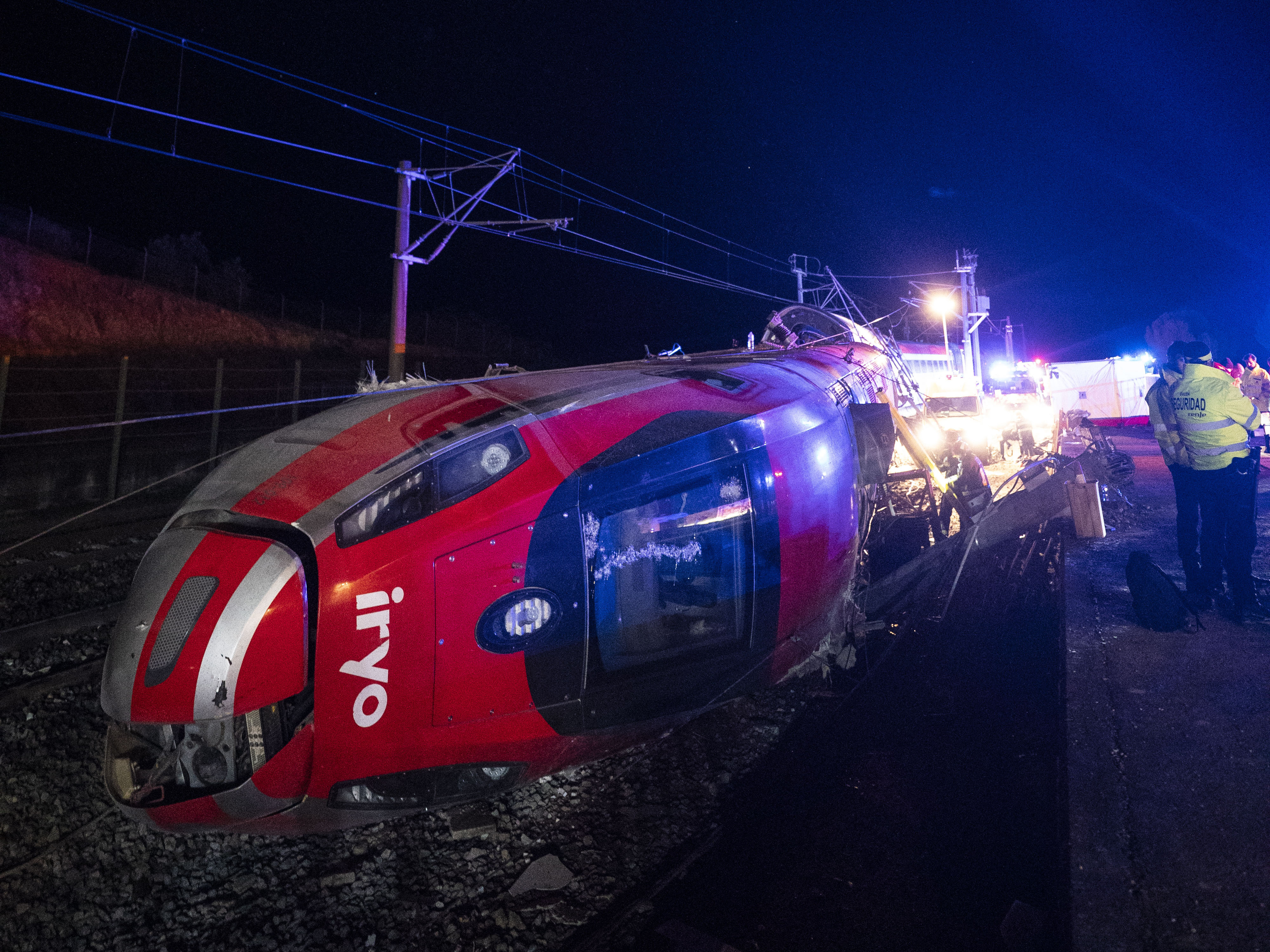
View of the crash site

A makeshift hospital was set up at a sports centre in Adamuz to treat the victims. The Civil Guard confirmed the suspension of high-speed rail service between Madrid and Andalusia for 19 January, which was subsequently extended until 23 January. It also opened offices in Córdoba, Madrid, Málaga, Huelva, and Seville for relatives of the missing and unidentified deceased to deliver DNA samples for identification. The stations of Madrid-Atocha, Córdoba–Julio Anguita, Seville–Santa Justa, and Málaga–María Zambrano remained open all night from 18 to 19 January to accommodate the hundreds of passengers who could not take their scheduled trains. The flag carrier airline Iberia increased flights to Seville and Málaga to assist stranded travelers.

Two days after the derailments, a commuter train hit a collapsed wall, derailed, and crashed in Gelida, Barcelona, killing a trainee driver and injuring 37 others. The derailment was believed to be caused (in part) by heavy rainfall that swept across the region in January 2026 as a result of Storm Harry, compromising the structural integrity of the wall. In response to the series of accidents starting with Adamuz, Spanish trade union SEMAF called for a three-day strike to take place in February 2026.

ADIF reopened the Madrid-Seville line, including the affected section through Adamuz, for service on 17 February 2026, after a period of intensive repairs and testing. However, due to pylon damage from a landslide on 4 February, the branch to Málaga remained closed for maintenance until 27 April.

== Reactions ==
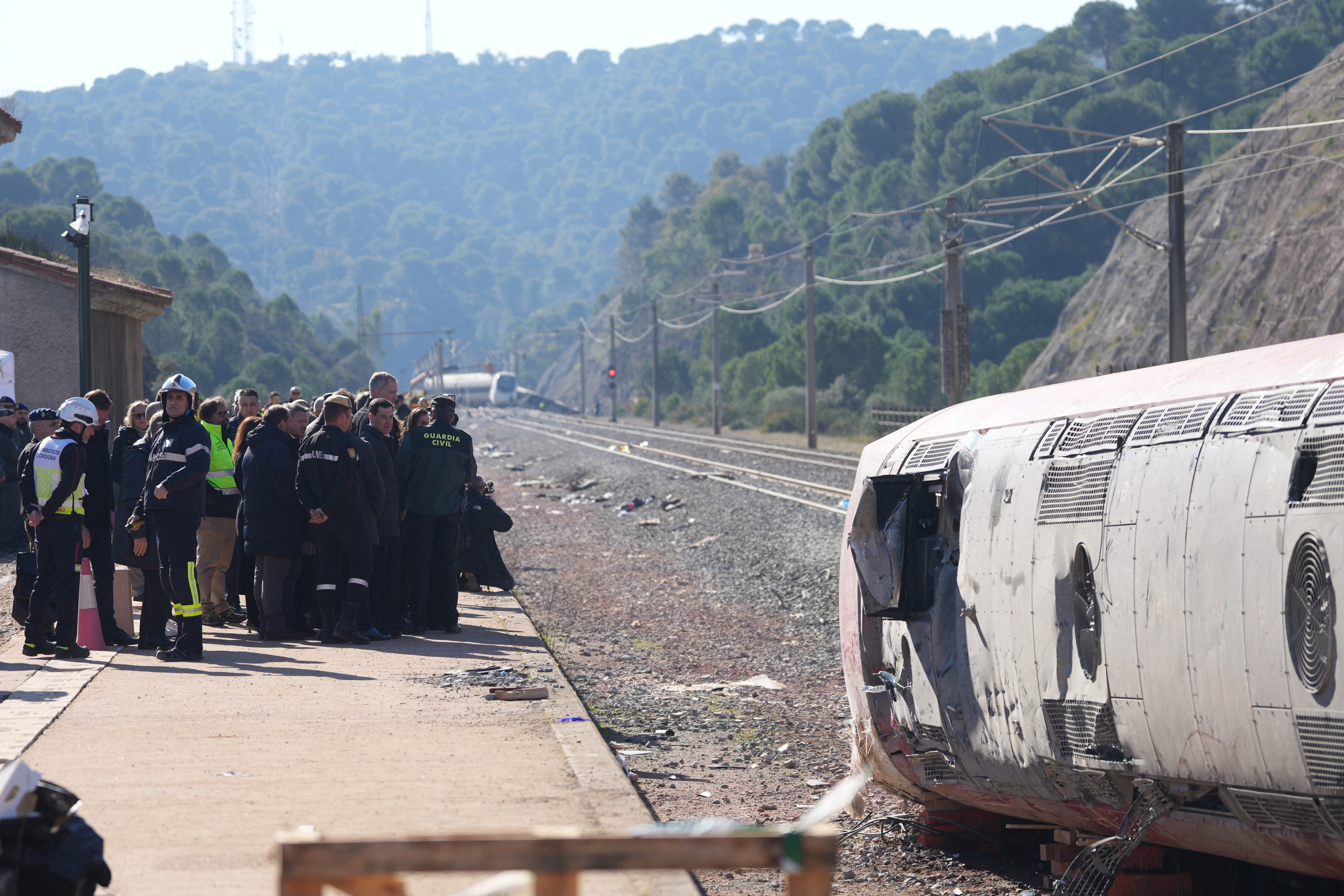
View of the crash site during an official visit by Felipe VI

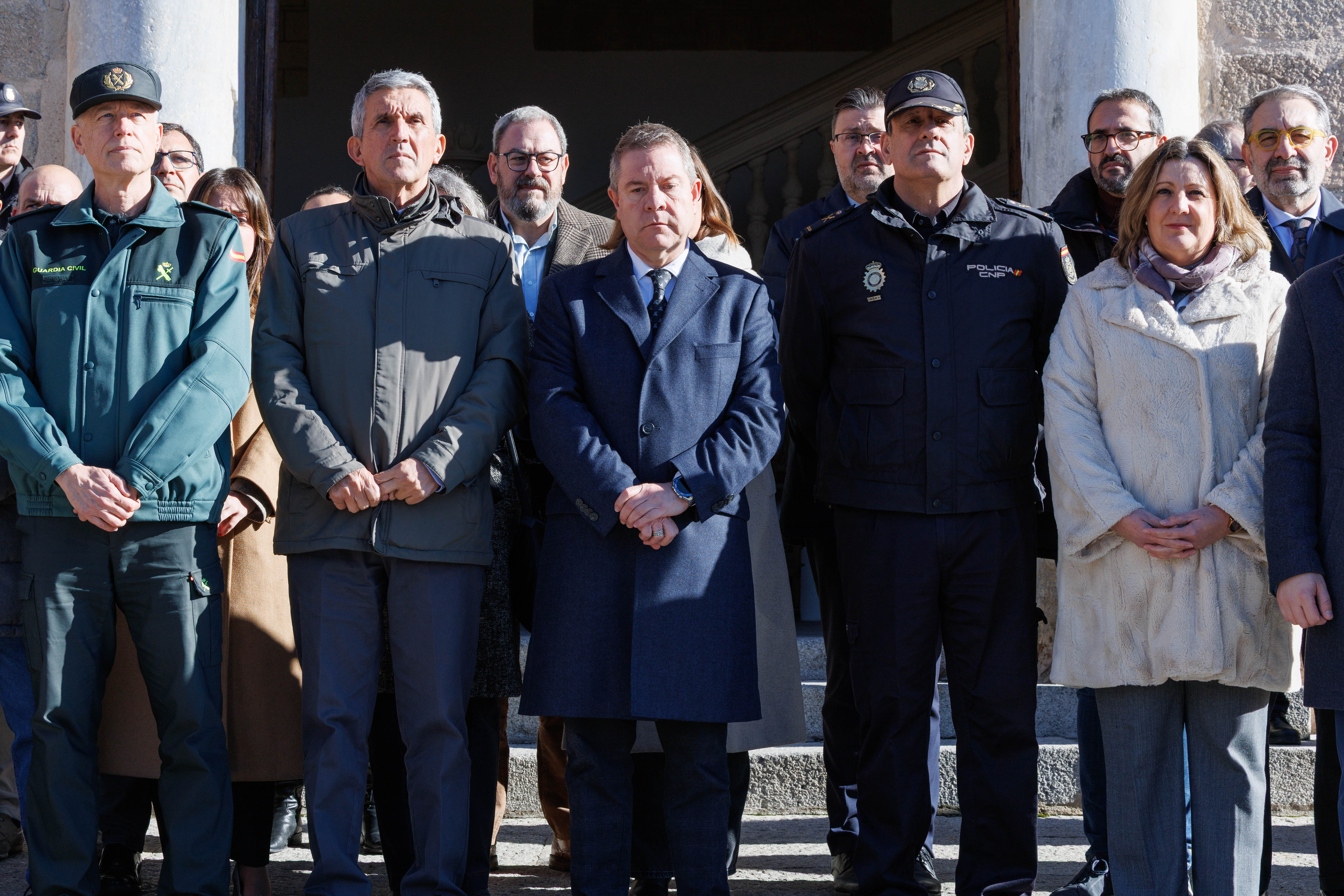
President of Castilla–La Mancha Emiliano García-Page holds a moment of silence for victims of the derailment on 19 January 2026

Prime Minister Pedro Sánchez said that the government was working with emergency services to help those affected, while Andalusian regional president Juanma Moreno expressed both his concern and support for the victims and their families. The infrastructure manager of the line ADIF said it would establish spaces for relatives of victims at Atocha, Seville, Córdoba, Málaga, and Huelva stations.

The defence ministry said it would deploy 15 vehicles and 40 personnel from the Military Emergencies Unit to the site of the derailment. Sánchez declared three days of official mourning, beginning on 20 January, and cancelled his scheduled visit to the World Economic Forum in Davos, Switzerland, in order to visit the crash site. King Felipe VI and his family, who were in Greece for the funeral of Princess Irene, expressed their dismay and solidarity with the victims and cancelled their schedule for 20 January to visit the crash site.

== See also ==
- 2026 Gelida train derailment
- 2026 Toledo train collision
- List of rail accidents (2020–present)
- List of rail accidents in Spain
