= Marta Shahbazi =

Spanish cell biology researcher (1985–2026)

- Born: July 1985; León, Spain
- Died: 28 October 2026 (aged 41); Los Yébenes, Spain
- Education: Autonomous University of Madrid; Spanish National Cancer Research Centre
- Scientific career
- Fields: Molecular biology
- Workplaces: MRC Laboratory of Molecular Biology; Cambridge Stem Cell Institute
- Doctoral advisor: Mirna Perez-Moreno

Marta Nasila Shahbazi Alonso (July 1985 – 28 October 2026) was a Spanish molecular biologist, who ran the Shahbazi Laboratory at the MRC Laboratory of Molecular Biology.

== Life and career ==
Marta Nasila Shahbazi Alonso was born in León, in July 1985, to a Spanish mother who was a school teacher and an Iranian father who fled his country after the Iranian Revolution. Her brother is Carlos Shahbazi, a research professor in mathematics at the National University of Distance Education.

She graduated from the biology department at the Autonomous University of Madrid with a master's degree in molecular biology. Her doctoral thesis, carried out at the Spanish National Cancer Research Centre under the supervision of Mirna Perez-Moreno, focuses on the mechanisms that preserve the shape and integrity of epidermal stem cells.

In 2014, she began her post-doctoral training at the University of Cambridge in the United Kingdom. Shahbasi joined the laboratory of Magdalena Zernicka-Goetz, studying the embryo's morphogenesis at the moment of implantation.

In 2016, her team successfully cultured human embryos outside the womb for 13 days, setting a world record.

Shahbazi led her own working group in the Molecular Biology Laboratory at the University of Cambridge since February 2020. This working group sought to better understand how the cells of an embryo specialize to become specific parts of the body. She was also an associate professor at the Cambridge Stem Cell Institute.

On 28 October 2026, she was traveling on the AVE train to receive the José Luis Gómez-Skarmeta Prize from the Spanish Society for Development Biology when the train collided with another. She was among those who died. Shahbazi is survived by two children and her husband.

== Awards ==
- 2019: The 3Rs Prize from the National Centre for the Replacement, Refinement and Reduction of Animals in Research
- 2024: Suffrage Science award, life science category
- 2026: SRUK/CERU Emerging Talent Award
- 2026: José Luis Gómez-Skarmeta Prize of the Spanish Society of Developmental Biology

== Selected publications ==
- Shahbazi, Marta; Vuoristo, Sanna; Jedrusik, Agnieszka; Zernicka-Goetz, Magdalena (5 May 2016). "Culture of human embryos through implantation stages in vitro" (PDF). Protocol Exchange. doi:10.1038/protex.2016.017. ISSN 2043-0116. OCLC 6035066333.
- Shahbazi, Marta N.; Jedrusik, Agnieszka; Vuoristo, Sanna; Recher, Gaelle; et al. (2016). "Self-organization of the human embryo in the absence of maternal tissues". Nature Cell Biology. 18 (6): 700–708. doi:10.1038/ncb3347. ISSN 1465-7392. PMC 5049689. PMID 27144686.
- Shahbazi, Marta N.; Scialdone, Antonio; Skorupska, Natalia; Weberling, Antonia; et al. (14 December 2017). "Pluripotent state transitions coordinate morphogenesis in mouse and human embryos". Nature. 552 (7684): 239–243. doi:10.1038/nature24675. ISSN 0028-0836. PMC 5768241.
- Shahbazi, Marta N.; Zernicka-Goetz, Magdalena (2018). "Deconstructing and reconstructing the mouse and human early embryo". Nature Cell Biology. 20 (8): 878–887. doi:10.1038/s41556-018-0144-x. ISSN 1465-7392.
- Shahbazi, Marta N.; Siggia, Eric D.; Zernicka-Goetz, Magdalena (7 June 2019). "Self-organization of stem cells into embryos: A window on early mammalian development". Science. 364 (6444): 948–951. doi:10.1126/science.aax0164. ISSN 0036-8075. PMC 8300856. PMID 31171690.
- Shahbazi, Marta; Musah, Samira; Sharma, Ankur; Bajaj, Jeevisha; et al. (2020). "Introductions to the Community: Early-Career Researchers in the Time of COVID-19". Cell Stem Cell. 27 (2): 200–201. doi:10.1016/j.stem.2020.07.016. OCLC 9093301588. PMC 7409799. PMID 32763182.
- Shahbazi, Marta N. (15 July 2020). "Mechanisms of human embryo development: from cell fate to tissue shape and back" (PDF). Development. 147 (14). doi:10.1242/dev.190629. ISSN 1477-9129. PMC 7375473. PMID 32680920.
- Shahbazi, Marta N. (2021). "Defining myself as a mother scientist". Cell Stem Cell. 28 (5): 796–798. doi:10.1016/j.stem.2021.04.018. PMC 9760975. PMID 33961762.
