= 2026 Niscemi landslide =

Landslide in Sicily, Italy

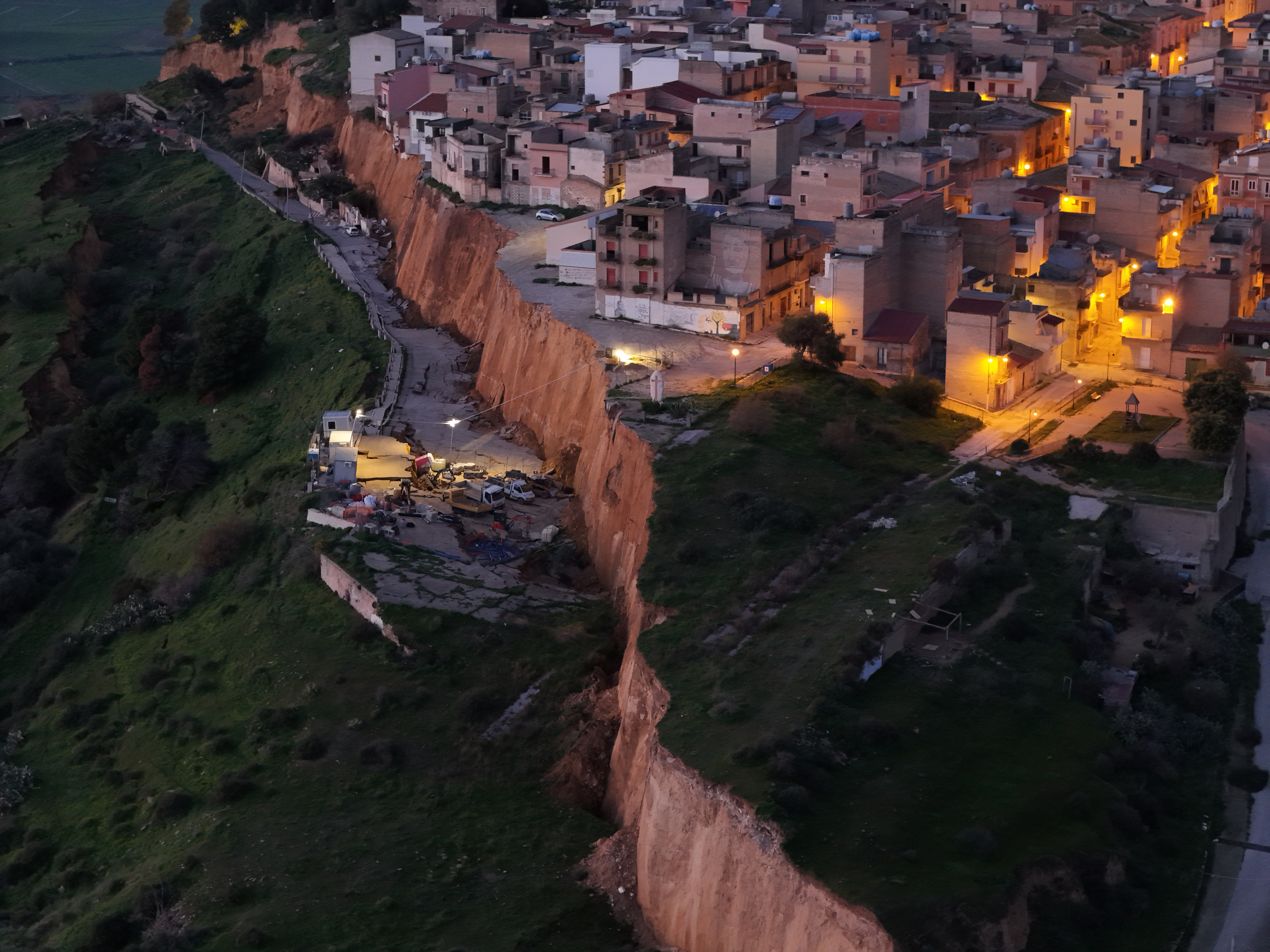
South-west edge of Niscemi with Via Scarfaiaccio slid down per 25 January 2026

A major landslide happened at the town of Niscemi, in Province of Caltanissetta, Sicily, Italy in 2026. A 4 km section of land collapsed, damaging buildings and infrastructure and causing the evacuation of over 1000 residents.

== Background ==
The town of Niscemi is at a historically geologically unstable area. The ground is rich in clay soil and has many slopes suffering from erosion. In January 2026, following continuous heavy rains over several days, the soaked ground weakened, causing a major landslide.

== Landslide ==
On 16 January 2026, a landslide occurred, causing the collapse of Provincial Road 12, which connects Niscemi to the Gela-Catania state road. The mayor had noticed a much larger landslide. On 17 January 2026, the mayor ordered the evacuation of the affected area. 35 people were evacuated for safety, schools were closed, and the Civil Protection Department was already monitoring the area, which presents serious risks of further worsening of the landslide. According to the Civil Protection Department, the landslide has recorded an estimated subsidence of between 6 and 7 meters, moving in the direction of the Maroglio River, with a front measuring 1.6 km and an extension of almost 1 square km. According to initial reports from the Civil Protection, the landslide is already large. This correct assessment allowed the inhabitants of Niscemi to be saved.

Starting on 19 January 2026, with the arrival of strong weather conditions, and then on 20/21 January 2026 with the arrival of Mediterranean Storm Harry, which lashed central and southern Italy, the landslide situation further worsened. On 25 January 2026, the landslide widened at 1 p.m. and residents fled. The mayor realized the magnitude of the landslide and was already evacuating people from the area.

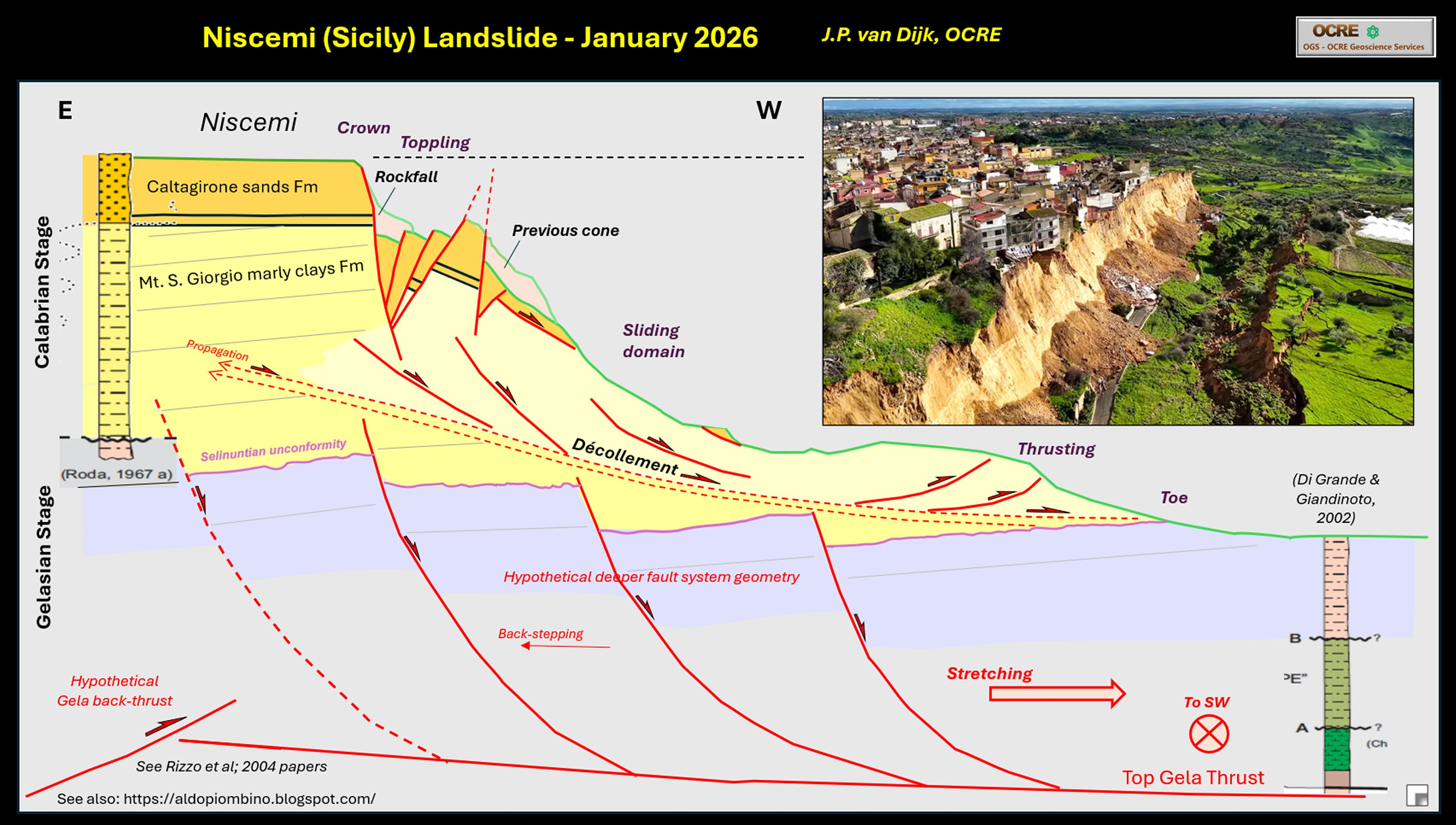
The section shows a schematic cross section of the Niscemi landslide illustrating the hypothesis that deeper tectonic processes have contributed to the gravitational instability of the area.

On the afternoon of 25 January 2026, the landslide widened; civil defense ordered 500 people to evacuate their homes. Parts of some houses along the landslide's front line collapsed. On the evening of 25 January 2026, the landslide front was wide. The affected area is between the Sante Croci neighborhood, the Belvedere district, and the area reaching the Benefizio stream and the Pirillo district. Salvo Cocina, Director General of the Civil Protection Department of the Sicilian Region, and Renato Schifani, President of the Sicilian Region, went to Niscemi to directly monitor the situation and coordinate the operational activities of the Civil Protection Department. The minister for civil protection and maritime policies, Nello Musumeci, is being informed of the landslide's evolution.

The landslide's progress was slow and spread over an approximately 4 km-long area. There were large cracks in the ground in residential areas. Roads were damaged and became unstable and many buildings were declared unsafe. Authorities have declared the area a "red zone", restricting residents from returning to the affected neighborhoods, as the ground continued to move.

== Evacuation and impact ==
Authorities took safety measures, evacuating over 1000 people. They were temporarily housed in emergency shelters and public buildings. No casualties were reported, but the landslide disrupted daily life, as many homes, houses and public structures were damaged and the town, cut off.

The Biblioteca Marsiano public library holds over 4,000 rare and historically valuable books, however it is in the "black zone" which is off-limits to firefighters.

== Response ==
The emergency response was managed by Italy's Civil Protection Department, that coordinated the evacuation, buildings inspection and monitoring the ongoing ground movement. Regional and local officials requested a state of emergency to obtain funding for aid, geological studies, and long-term safety measures.

== See also ==
Fly over the landslide 46 days after the main movement

- 2025–26 European windstorm season
- List of landslides
- Geology of Sicily
- Natural disasters in Italy
