= Francisco Javier León de la Riva =

Spanish politician (born 1945)

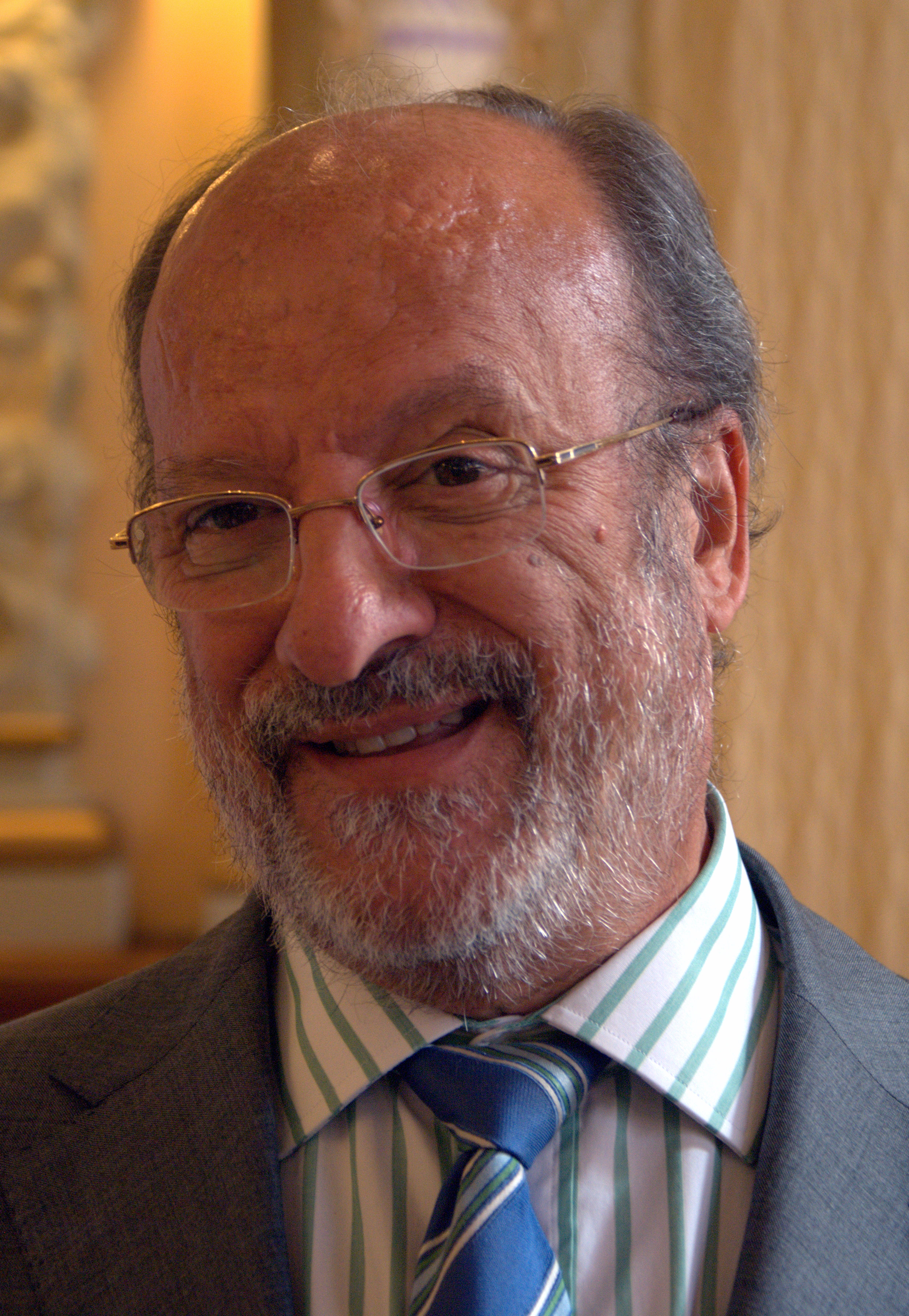
- Francisco Javier León

Mayor of Valladolid
- In office 23 June 1995 – 13 June 2015
- Preceded by: Tomás Rodríguez Bolaños
- Succeeded by: Óscar Puente

Minister of Culture and Social Welfare of the Junta of Castile and León
- In office 27 July 1987 – 5 July 1991
- Preceded by: Antonio Araúzo González
- Succeeded by: José Manuel Fernández Santiago

Procurator in the Cortes of Castile and León
- In office 10 June 1987 – 13 June 1999

Councilor of the Valladolid City Council
- In office 15 June 1991 – 5 June 2015

Personal details
- Born: 15 November 1945 (age 80) Valladolid, Spain
- Party: People's Alliance (1982-1989); People's Party (1989-)
- Education: University of Valladolid
- Occupation: Politician; Doctor

Francisco Javier León de la Riva (born 15 November 1945) is a Spanish politician and doctor. He was a member of the People's Alliance (AP) from 1982 to 1989, and the People's Party (PP) since 1989. He was the mayor of Valladolid from 1995 to 2015, and vice president of Caja Duero from 1996 to 2008. He was a member of the Cortes of Castile and León from 1987 to 1999, where he was the PP spokesperson.

== Biography ==
Born in Valladolid, León de la Riva studied at the University of Valladolid, where he received a doctorate in medicine, and became a gynecologist. He left gynecology in 1987.

In May 2015, days after losing his seat as mayor after 20 years, León de la Riva was disqualified from public office for 13 months for disobeying court orders. For five years, he had not followed court orders to restore legality to the Caja Duero building, which had numerous planning irregularities.

In mid-2021, León de la Riva suffered a health emergency. In November that year, he returned to the public, on a weekly radio show on Cadena COPE in Valladolid.
