= Gelida Funicular =

Funicular railway in Catalonia, Spain

Coordinates: 41.4429°N 1.86463°E

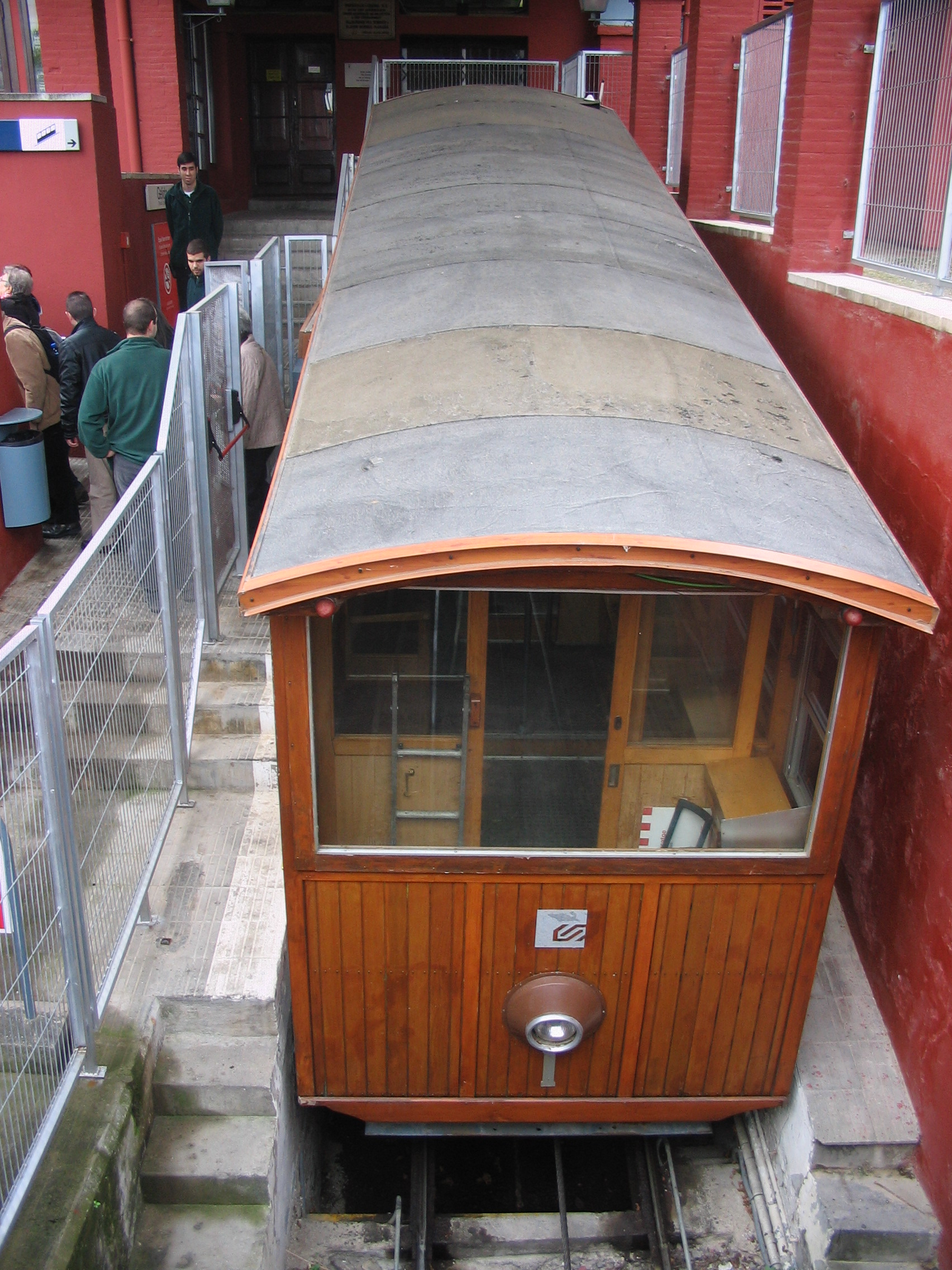
The upper station, in Gelida town.

The Gelida Funicular (Catalan: Funicular de Gelida; Spanish: Funicular de Gelida) is a funicular railway in the municipality of Gelida in Catalonia, Spain. The line connects Gelida station, on the Renfe network, with the centre of the village of Gelida, which is at a higher level. The line was opened in 1924 and modernised in 1984, whilst retaining a heritage ambience.

The funicular has the following technical parameters:

- Length: 884 m (2,900 ft)
- Height: 110 m (361 ft)
- Maximum Steepness: 22.2 %
- Cars: 2
- Capacity: 50 passengers per car; 700 passengers per hour
- Configuration: Single track with passing loop
- Maximum speed: 2.5 m/s (8.2 ft/s)
- Travel time: 8 minutes
- Track gauge: 1,000 mm (3 ft 3 3/8 in) metre gauge
- Traction: Electricity

Although two cars were in operation, as an economy measure only one was normally staffed and carried passengers, whilst the other simply served as a counterweight. Despite this restriction, the funicular was timed to connect with the main line trains, which operate every half-hour on weekdays and hourly on weekends. Besides the two terminals at Gelida Inferior and Superior, the line served an intermediate request stop at Gelida-Baixador, situated between the passing loop and upper station. In September 2011, the service was suspended due to government's spending cuts, as it was considered too expensive to maintain. Since then the service has been replaced by a shuttle bus, with the funicular operating only at weekends. The service was suspended on 6 March 2016 following a review in which a number of cracks were detected in the rolling elements but is operational again (at weekends) from April 6, 2019.

The line is operated by the Ferrocarrils de la Generalitat de Catalunya (Catalan Government Railways, FGC), who also operate a significant suburban railway system in and around Barcelona, along with three other funiculars and two rack railways.
