= ILSA =

Spanish open access railway operator

- Intermodalidad de Levante, S.A.

- Established: 2015
- Type: Railway operator
- Legal status: Public limited company
- Headquarters: Avenida Comarcas del País Valenciano 2, Quart de Poblet, 46930, Valencia, Spain
- Fields: Rail transport
- Owner: Trenitalia; Operador Ferroviario de Levante; Globalvia
- Chairman: Carlos Bertomeu
- Managing director: Fabrizio Favara
- Staff: 857 (2026)
- Website: www.ilsarail.eu

Intermodalidad de Levante S.A., also known as ILSA, is a Spanish railway company. The company operates on Spain's high-speed rail (HSR) network, under the Iryo brand. Its objective is to serve Spain's main high-speed rail routes, particularly the Madrid–Barcelona line, with 16 daily services in each direction. ILSA connects Madrid, Barcelona, Valencia, Alicante, Seville, Málaga, Córdoba, Zaragoza, Ciudad Real, and Cuenca, and has expressed interest in gradually expanding to other high-speed routes.

The Italian subsidiaries Trenitalia and Operador Ferroviario de Levante S.L. own 51% and 49% of the company respectively. The latter in turn is owned by the Air Nostrum and Globalvia airlines' shareholders.

The company has invested €800 million in acquiring 20 new ETR 1000 series trains from Hitachi Rail and Bombardier Transportation. The motors are manufactured in Biscay, while the entire train is assembled in Pistoia, Italy.

== See also ==
- High-speed rail in Spain
