= 2026 Gelida train derailment =

Rail accident in Catalonia, Spain

2026 Catalonia train derailment
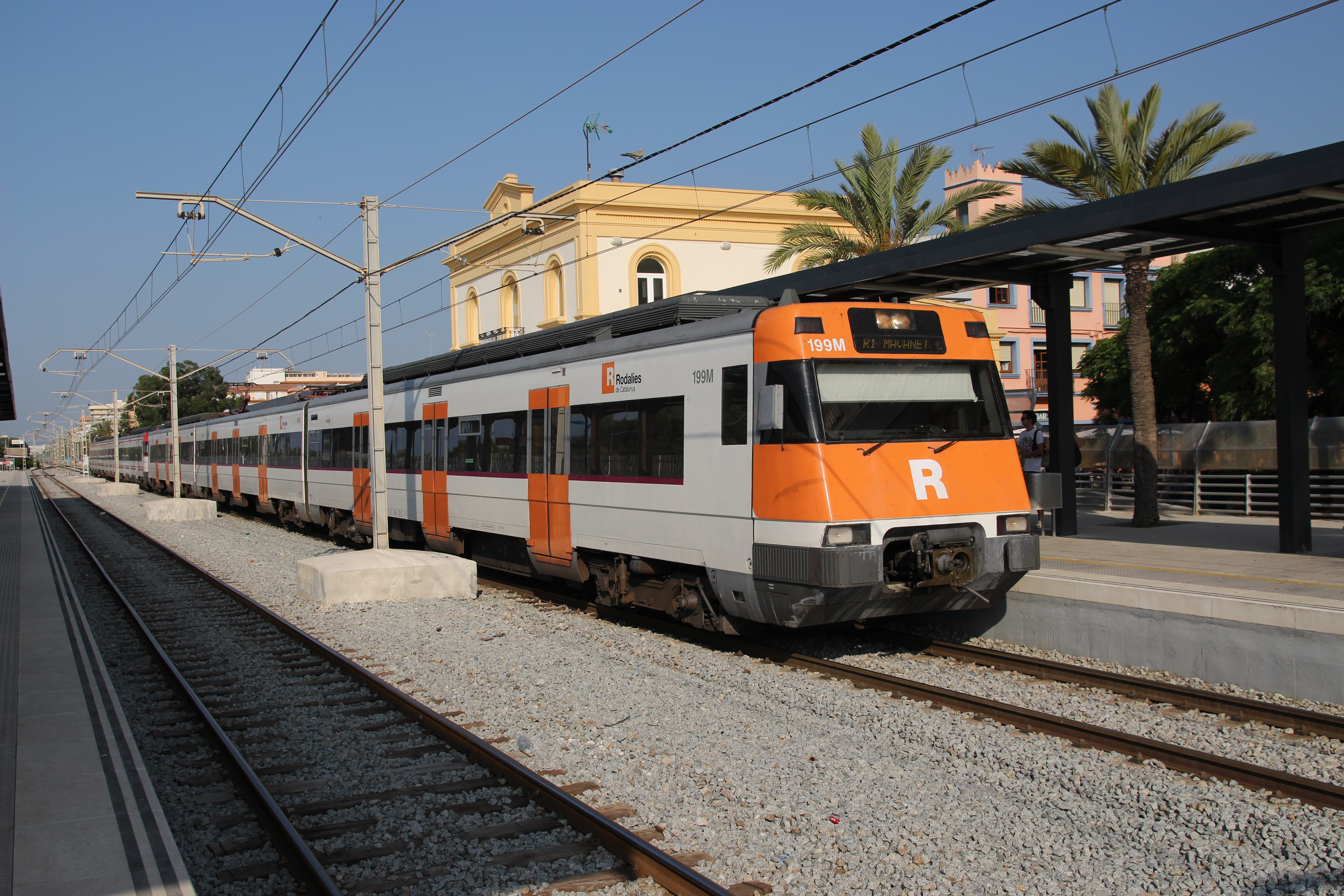
- The type of train involved (Class 447)

Details
- Date: 20 January 2026; 9:00 p.m. CET
- Location: Gelida, Catalonia
- Country: Spain
- Line: R4
- Owner: Rodalies de Catalunya
- Incident type: Derailment, wall collapse caused by landslide

Statistics
- Trains: 1
- Passengers: 37
- Deaths: 1
- Injured: 37+

On 20 January 2026, a Rodalies de Catalunya commuter train collided with a retaining wall after it was struck by a landslide, causing the train to derail between Gelida and Sant Sadurní d'Anoia, Catalonia. A trainee driver who travelled in the driver's cab was killed and at least 37 passengers were injured. Preliminary investigations state that the cause of the retaining wall collapse was heavy rainfall during Storm Harry. The derailment occurred just two days after two trains collided near Adamuz in southern Spain, killing 46 people.

== Incident ==
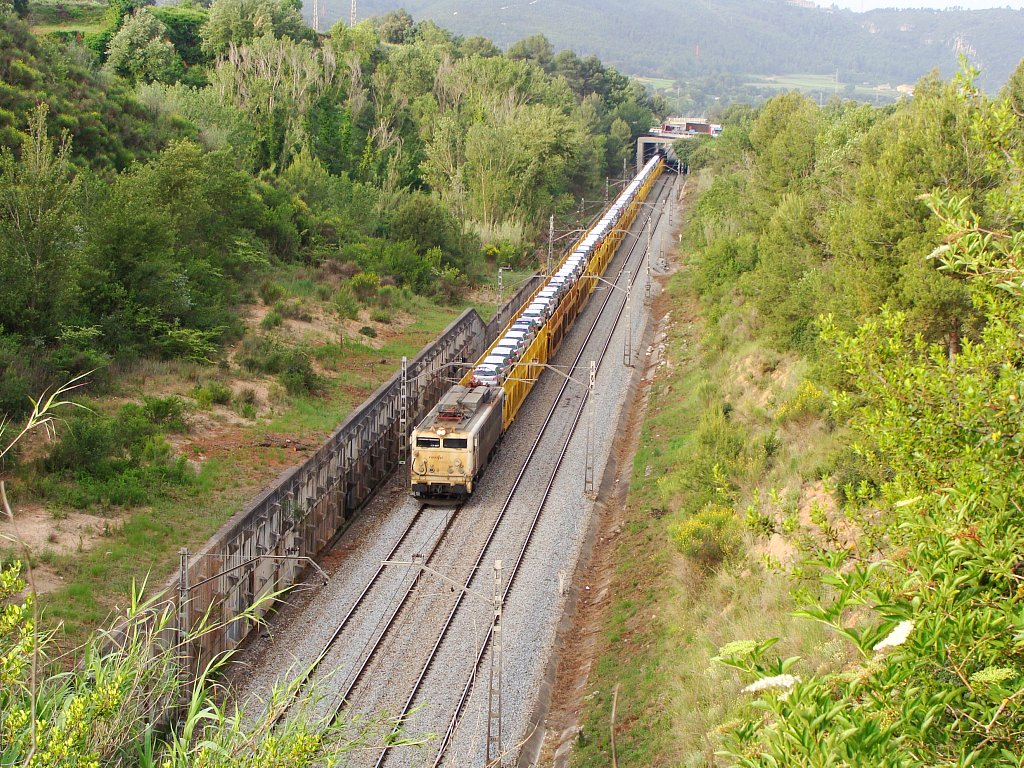
The railway line near the site of the derailment, photographed in 2009

The train was operating an R4 service between the stations of Sant Sadurní d'Anoia and Gelida when it collided with a retaining wall after a landslide caused it to collapse onto the tracks. The wall supported an overpass under which the tracks cross the AP-7 highway. Approximately 37 people were on board at the time of the derailment.

Preliminary investigations after the analysis of the train event recorder revealed that the train only started braking five seconds before impact with the collapsed wall. The train was travelling at around 60 kph. The wall would have collapsed due to the heavy rainfalls pouring over the area during the previous hours.

In a separate incident on the same night, traffic between Blanes and Maçanet-Massanes was interrupted after a train derailed on line R1 near Tordera.

== Aftermath ==
Among the injured, five were critical, six were less serious and 26 were minor. Emergency services mobilised a total of 38 fire crews and 11 ambulances to attend to the victims. Search and rescue operations were conducted for trapped victims. The most seriously injured were transferred to Bellvitge Hospital and Moises Broggi Hospital and those with minor injuries were treated at the field hospital at the scene.

Spain's railway operator, Adif, remarked that the containment wall's collapse was probably due in part to heavy rainfall that swept across the region this week as a result of Storm Harry, compromising the structural integrity of the wall. Following the derailment, train service was suspended on the entire Rodalies network in order to conduct security inspections. This had a number of consequences, including the suspension of toll fees on the C-32 highway and the cancellation of exams at the University of Barcelona. Some service was restored on 24 January, but was resuspended later that day as disruptions persisted and maintenance continued.

== See also ==
- 2026 Adamuz rail disaster
- 2026 Toledo train collision
- List of rail accidents (2020–present)
- List of rail accidents in Spain
