= Geology of Sicily =

The geology of Sicily (a large island located at Italy's southwestern end) records the collision of the Eurasian and the African plates during westward-dipping subduction of the African slab since late Oligocene. Major tectonic units are the Hyblean foreland, the Gela foredeep, the Apenninic-Maghrebian orogen, and the Calabrian Arc. The orogen represents a fold-thrust belt that folds Mesozoic carbonates, while a major volcanic unit (Mt Etna) is found in an eastern portion of the island. The collision of Africa and Eurasia is a retreating subduction system, such that the descending Africa is falling away from Eurasia, and Eurasia extends and fills the space as the African plate falls into the mantle, resulting in volcanic activity in Sicily and the formation of Tyrrhenian slab to the north.

== Major tectonic units ==
=== Hyblean foreland ===
Simplified geological map of Sicily

The foreland consists of exposures of the Hyblean Plateau and the offshore areas of Gela. The subduction forms a northward-dipping monocline in the foreland with a dip of 16–18°, which is a high angle compared to other regional monoclines. It is suggested that this steep angle is caused by a higher subductibility of the African slab. Deformation in the foreland is dominated by normal faulting; most of these faults have been formed in the Neogene by plate flexure. Some of the faults are recognized to be much older, formed in the Mesozoic. The faults are suggested to have separated high-standing platforms from deeper basins.

The simplified stratigraphy includes the following units:

Age	Rock type	Formation environment	Thickness
Late Pliocene–Early Pleistocene	Intermittent basalts		
Pliocene–Pleistocene	Chalk/ calcarenite		
Jurassic–Late Miocene	Limestone, w/ thick basalt interbedding	Platform slope and open-shelf	1–2km
Triassic–Early Jurassic	Limestone/ carbonate turbidites	Shallow-water sea	5–7km

The post-Paleogene geological events of the foreland can be divided into four main stages:

- At early Miocene, thrusting and volcanic activity triggered a regional uplift at the foreland, which caused the emergence of a broad carbonate platform in the eastern Hyblean Plateau.
- During the Messinian of late Miocene, the Messinian salinity crisis occurred as a result of sea-level fall and major uplift, causing deposition of evaporites over the Mediterranean basin. The dry climate resulted in extensive erosion in high-standing regions of the plateau.
- At Early Pliocene, rapid subsidence occurred at the foreland. This subsidence event occurred simultaneously with a major rise in Mediterranean sea level, during which Plio-Pleistocene sediments were accumulated in the foreland basin.
- During the Late Miocene-Early Pleistocene, a massive basaltic volcanic activity occurred. After the emission of alkali basalts during the Late Miocene, major volcanic activity occurred during the Late Pliocene, in which large volumes of tholeiitic basalts were emitted and the foredeep north of the Hyblean foreland collapsed.

=== Gela foredeep ===
The Gela foredeep extends from the northern margin of the Hyblean plateau on land to the offshore Gela basin of southwestern Sicily. Based on fossil analysis, the basin has been developing since Late Pliocene; its formation is related to the bending of the carbonate platform due to loading at the front of the Gela nappe. The basin fill consists of Late Miocene-Pleistocene sediments, including marly limestones, Messinian evaporites and sandy clays.

Simplified cross-section of the Apenninic-Maghrebian chain

=== The Apenninic-Maghrebian orogen ===
The central to western part of Sicily is made of the Maghrebian-Apenninic orogen and represents the fold and thrust belt of the subduction system. A combination of frontal accretion and low-angle detachments formed the present geological structure. The orogen consists of a stack of detached nappes that involves mostly the Mesozoic carbonate, which has subsequently been folded into a syncline, underlying a broad anticline of the Caltanissetta area.

The stratigraphy of the accretionary wedge is composed of the following units:

Stratigraphic unit	Age	Thickness	Rock type	Formation environment	Structures
Wedge-top deposits	Upper Miocene–Pleistocene		Marl/evaporites	Shallow water/arid environment	
Sicilide unit	Cretaceous–Early Tertiary	200–300m	Carbonates	Pelagic zone/sedimentary basin	SW-&SE-vergent folds
Numidian Flysch unit	Upper Oligocene–Lower Miocene	1–1.5km	Clays/quartzarenites		Imbricate fans, SW-&SE-vergent folds
Imerese/Sicanian unit	Permian-Cenozoic	>1.5km	Carbonates	Deep water	Antiformal stacks
Transpanse–Saccense unit	Meso-Cenozoic	>5km	Limestone	Shallow water/pelagic zone	Imbricate fans
Hyblean unit	Mesozoic	7–8km	Limestone	Shallow water/pelagic zone	Imbricate fans, ached

=== Calabrian crystalline basement ===
The northeastern part of Sicily consists of the Calabrian Arc unit, the tectonic unit that connects the Apennines with the North African Maghrebide. Paleozoic igneous and metamorphic basement rocks are exposed at this part of the island, suggested to have been exposed by exhumation processes between mid-Oligocene and Middle Miocene. The rapid migration of the Calabrian Arc towards the southeast was driven by the retreat of the Ionian slab east of Sicily. In early Miocene, Calabria was still attached to Sardinia. In Middle Miocene, the trench rolled back to the east and normal faulting occurred between Calabria and Sardinia, causing Calabria to split eastward from Sardinia. By Early Pliocene, the retreat of Calabria consumed the oceanic slab of the Ionian sea while new oceanic crust was created in the Tyrrhenian Sea by back-arc magmatism. Since Pleistocene, the eastern portion of the arc formed the Apennine mountain of Italy, while the Calabrian block slid to Sicily through right lateral strike-slip motion, forming the northeastern portion of the island. GPS measurements show that the Calabrian Arc still advances to the southeast at 2-3mm per year at present, due to the ongoing rollback of the Ionian slab.

The simplified stratigraphy consists of the following units:

Age	Rock type
Early Pliocene	Chalk
Messinian	Evaporites
Middle Miocene-Messinian	Rift deposits/sandy marls
Paleogene-Middle Miocene	Arkosic Turbidites
Triassic-Late Cretaceous	Carbonate
Palaeozoic	Igneous/Metamorphic (basement)

3-D geological model of subduction system and mantle flow of Mount Etna. The Ionian slab (green) is subducting beneath Tyrrhenian slab (blue), pulling magma under African slab (yellow) to the low pressure zone (pink) and upwell to form Mt. Etna.

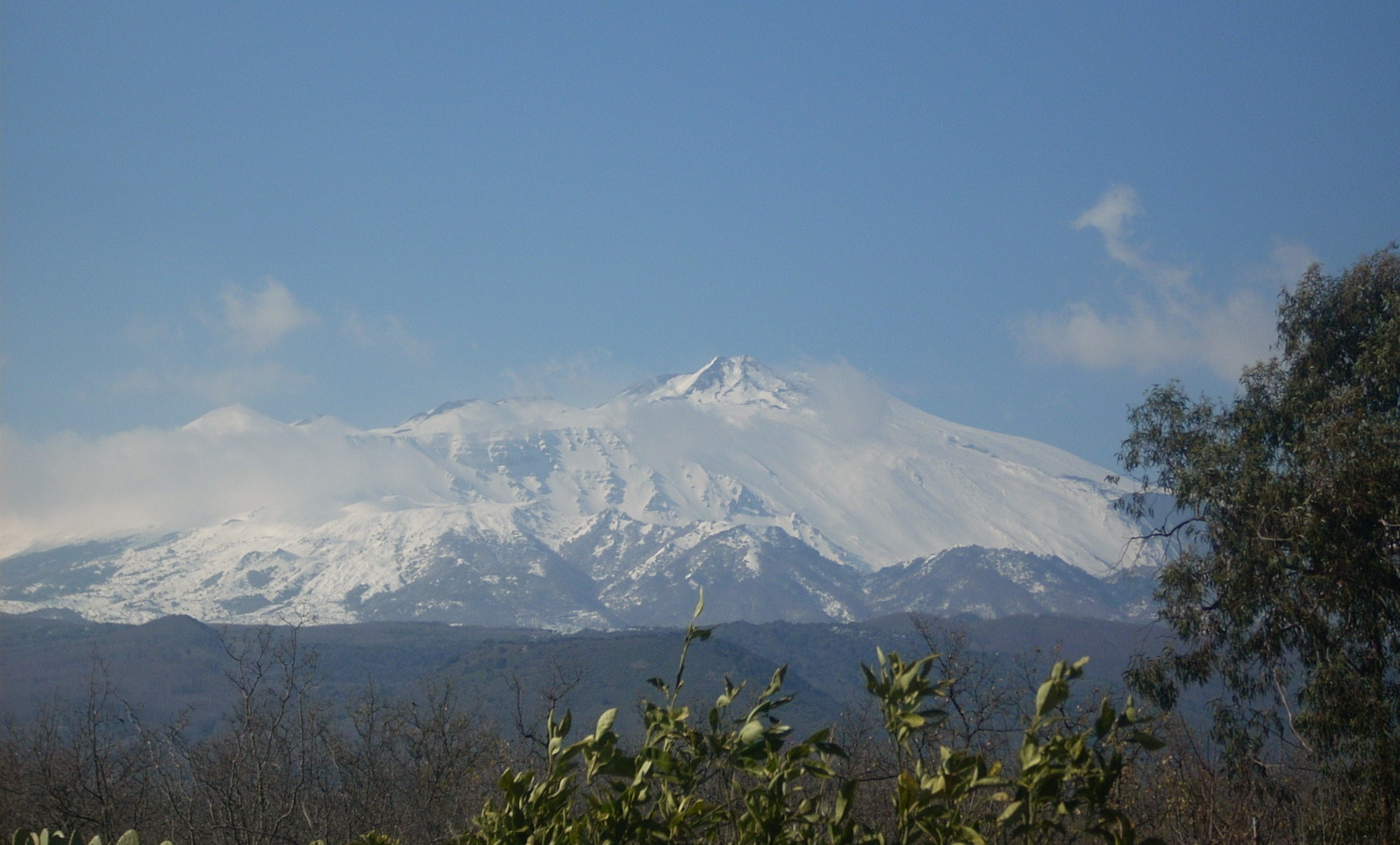
Mount Etna.

== Mount Etna ==
Mount Etna is an active stratovolcano located at the eastern coast of Sicily which is composed mainly of basalt. Its formation began at about 0.5 Ma when submarine volcanism occurred at the Gela foredeep and formed tholeiitic pillow lava. At about 0.3 Ma, a tholeiitic lava plateau was formed on an ancient alluvial plain by fissure-type volcanism. From 0.22 Ma, volcanism mainly occurred at the Ionian coast which formed an alkaline shield volcano with length of 15 km at the N-S direction, until volcanism shifted westward to the current location of Mt. Etna at about 129 ka. Finally, central-vent type volcanism began with the formation of two small parasitic cones, which the eruption of these two cones ended at 106 and 102 ka. It is suggested that the formation of Mount Etna is closely related to the subduction system of Sicily. Although the magma does not originate from the subducted material, the retreat of African slab creates a low-pressure zone at the mantle wedge under Calabria, which pulls the asthenospheric material under the African plate laterally towards the northeast. This process produces a large volume of magma that caused upwelling under Mount Etna, as well as the regional uplift of the Calabrian unit.

== Tectonic history ==
The tectonic setting of Sicily is controlled by the rate of collision of the African plate and Eurasian plate and the rate of back rolling of the African plate. The tectonic history of Sicily can be divided into four main stages:

=== Late Triassic–Early Jurassic period ===
During Late Triassic, the ancient Neotethys ocean was formed by a major continental rifting event and rapid tectonic subsidence. Traces of the tectonic event can be found at both the Hyblean plateau and western Sicily.

=== Early Jurassic–Late Cretaceous period ===
Simplified evolutionary diagram of Sicily

After the rapid subsidence during Triassic to Early Jurassic, there was a slow thermal subsidence at the Mediterranean basin from Jurassic to Late Cretaceous that formed the Neotethyan carbonate platform.

=== Late Cretaceous–Palaeogene period ===
During Late Cretaceous and Palaeogene, the collision of African and Eurasian plates generated compressive stress in the region. The Neotethyan ocean was closed by the collision and the continental margin became active.

=== Neogene–Quaternary period ===
Sicily has been undergoing a phase of uplifting and subduction since Neogene. The African slab retreats to the east as the collision of Eurasian and African plate continued. Since late Oligocene, the orogenic process started when sediments accreted onto the Calabrian block while flysch was deposited in the foreland basins. The Sardinia block then underwent counter-clockwise rotation and the Calabrian unit subsequently underwent clockwise rotation. During the Early–Middle Miocene, shallow seated thrusting occurred which formed the wedge-top basins. Since Late Miocene, thrusting occurred in the Sicilian orogen and Calabrian accretionary wedge. Extension and back-arc magmatism occurred in the Tyrrhenian slab due to the fast roll back of the Ionian slab, while Calabria migrated to the current position at northeast Sicily.

== Mining ==
Sicily is known for its history of sulfur production. Sulfur mining was active until the 20th century. The sulfur was extracted in a number of ways involving heating, melting and cooling the semi-purified sulfur in various approaches collectively called Sicilian method. Abandoned sulfur mines includes those in Castelterminin, Enna and Caltanissetta. The major ores were sulfur-bearing sedimentary deposits, formed during the Messinian Salinity Crisis, which thick layers of evaporites including gypsum and other evaporitic sulfur were deposited in the central Sicilian basin when the area was above sea level. These native sulfurs are associated with secondary carbonates and are suggested to be formed by intense microbial sulfate reduction, in which microorganisms 'breath in' sulfate instead of oxygen for anaerobic respiration.
