= Storm Harry =

2026 windstorm over northwestern Europe

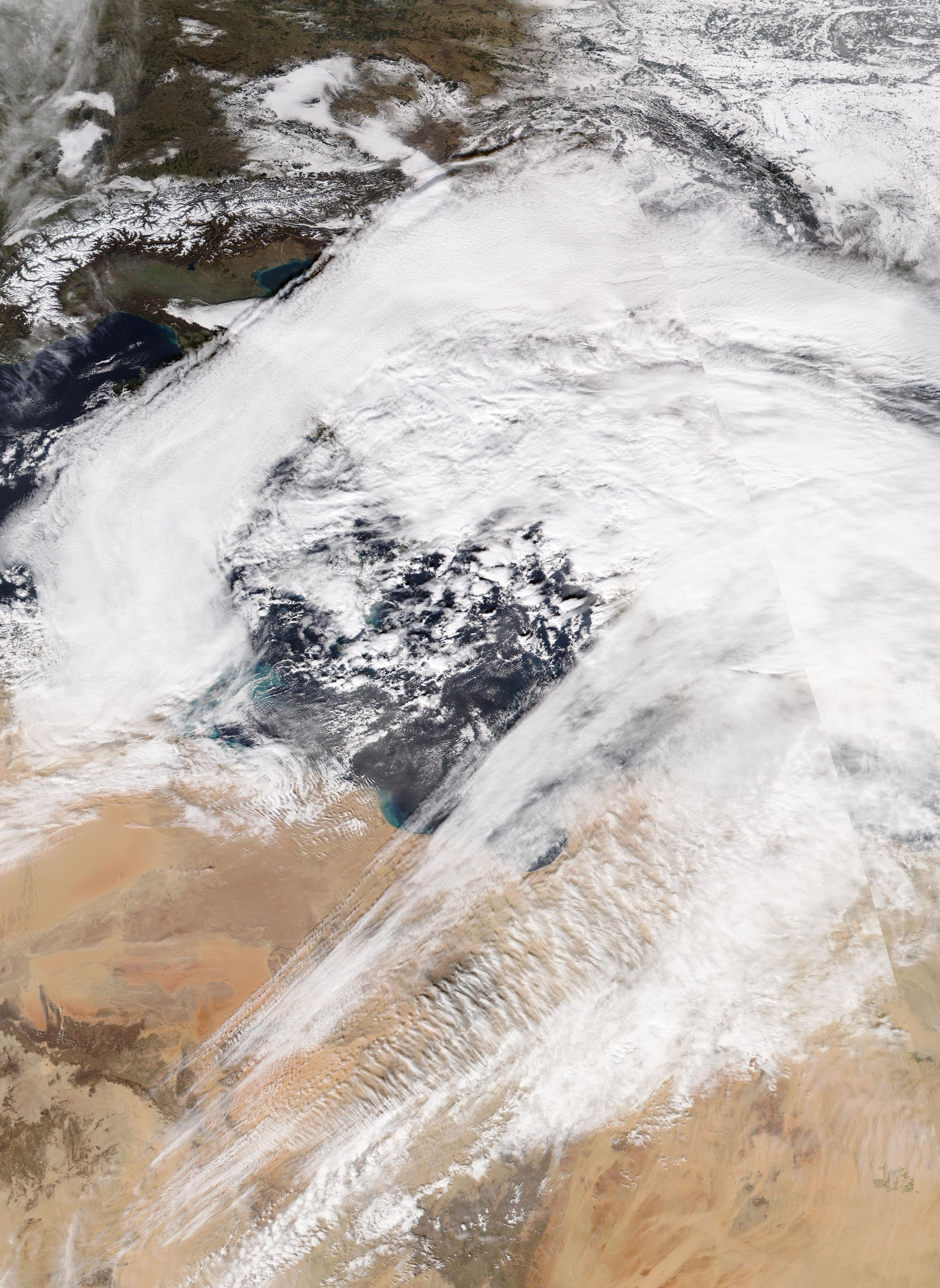
- Storm Harry on 21 January

Meteorological history
- Formed: 16 January 2026
- Dissipated: 23 January 2026

Extratropical cyclone
- Highest gusts: 81 mph (36 m/s; 70 kn; 130 km/h) at Mount Teide, Tenerife
- Lowest pressure: 995 hPa (29.38 inHg)

Overall effects
- Fatalities: 390+
- Areas affected: Canary Islands, Spain, Portugal, France, Algeria, Tunisia, Italy, Malta
- Power outages: Unspecified
- Part of the 2025–26 European windstorm season

Storm Harry, also known as Cyclone Harry, was a catastrophic and deadly extratropical cyclone that impacted countries surrounding the Mediterranean in mid January 2026. It was responsible or partially responsible for upwards of 380 deaths of migrants who were trying to cross the Mediterranean sea by boat which capsized during the storm. The death toll could be much higher: according to the NGO Mediterranea, around 1,000 migrants are believed to have lost their lives attempting the crossing. The storm caused the 2026 Gelida train derailment and the 2026 Niscemi landslide

Harry was named by the South-Western Group (Météo-France, AEMET, and IPMA) as the eighth high-impact storm of the 2025-26 season.

The storm formed as a "cut-off low" or DANA (Depresión Aislada en Niveles Altos) over the Iberian Peninsula. High-pressure blocks further north caused the system to remain nearly stationary, leading to prolonged and intense impacts. Between 19-22 January the storm produced the greatest individual wave heights and seismic storm signals ever measured in the Mediterranean Sea region.

== Preparations and warnings ==
=== Spain and Portugal ===
AEMET issued Yellow Warnings for persistent rain and localised thunderstorms in northeastern Spain, particularly across the Barcelona and Girona regions, with some areas expecting up to 20 mm of accumulation in a single hour. Meanwhile, the Canary Islands are under a Coastal Alert as a northwest swell is generating waves of 4 to 5 meters, coinciding with spring tides that increase the risk of coastal flooding.

AEMET issued orange torrential rain warnings as rain was pumped toward Catalonia and Valencia, with expected accumulations over 150 l/m² and severe flooding risks. Maritime conditions are critical, with waves reaching 10 meters along the eastern coast and historic snow depth (up to 90 cm) hitting the Pyrenees. A red warning for rain was issued on 20 January 2026, for Empordà for up to 180 mm in 12 hours.

=== Italy and France ===
Italy issued red warnings. A high-intensity red alert was issued for Tuesday, 20 January, as stationary bands of rain were expected to dump over 100mm in 24 hours. This posed a major threat of landslides and flash floods in the steep terrain of Sicily and Calabria, accompanied by 60 mph gale-force winds.

Meteo France also issued, orange warnings for Eastern Corsica as the island went on high alert for intense easterly gales with gusts reaching 100 km/h and heavy localised rainfall. The storm generated hazardous maritime swells along the coast, particularly disrupting travel and caused significant overtopping in exposed northern and eastern harbours.

=== Malta ===
Maltese Home Affairs Minister Byron Camilleri and the Maltese Civil Protection Department (CPD) urged residents of Malta to stay indoors and avoid coastal areas due to the severe weather, in addition to various services such as ferry transport and garbage collection being suspended by the government. Schools in Mellieħa, St Paul's Bay and Qawra, as well as MCAST and the University of Malta's Junior College, were temporarily closed as a precautionary measure. The Malta International Airport Met Office issued a red warning for level 9 gale-force winds on 19 January 2026, persisting through the 20th.

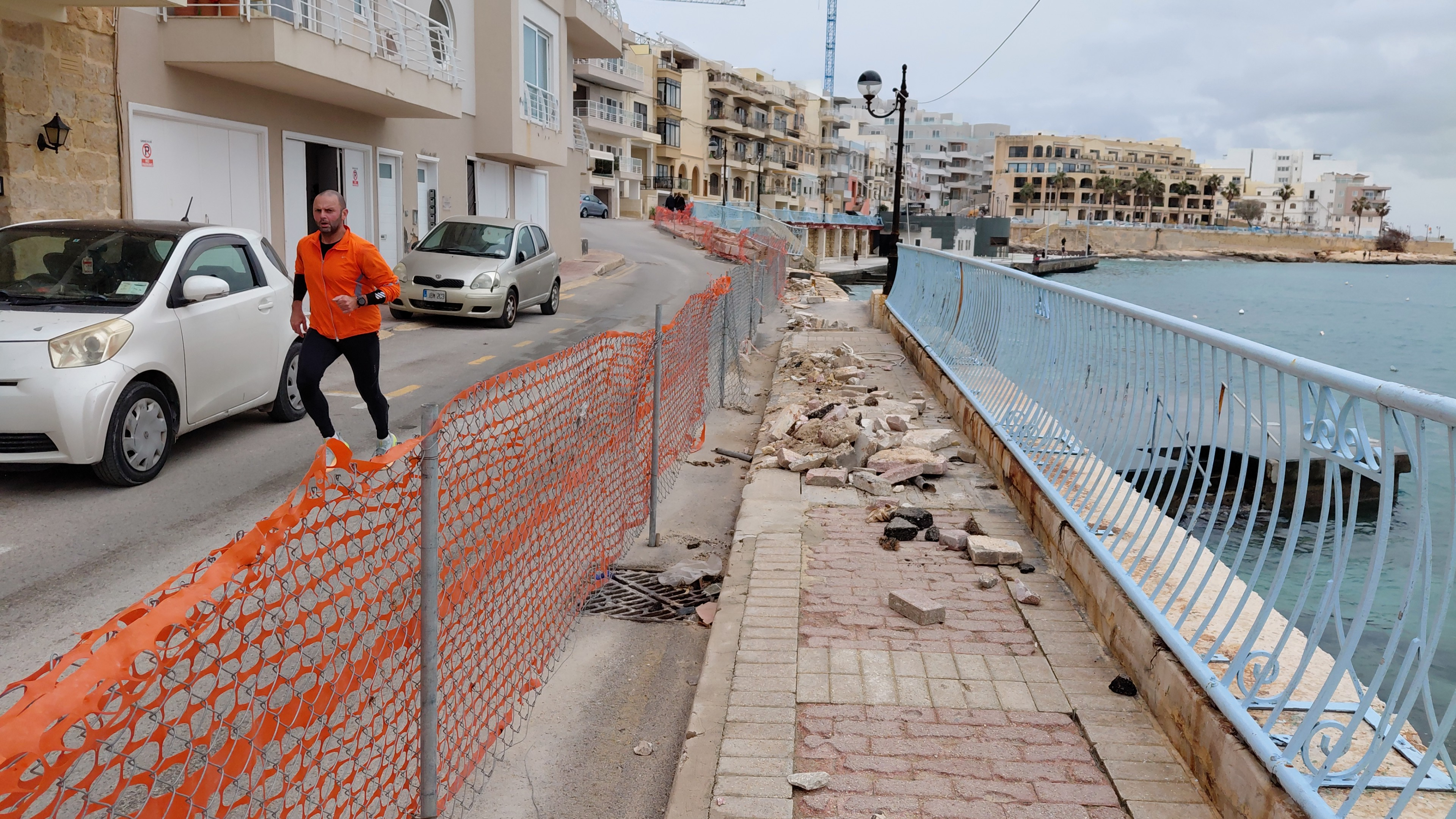
Marsaskala after Storm Harry

== Impacts ==
According to statistics issued by the Times of Malta, the Civil Protection Department of Malta had responded to more than 180 incidents, while the Armed Forces of Malta was called in to help vessels in rough seas by 20 January 2026, mid-afternoon. The Civil Protection Department (CPD) had a busy 30 hours, saying in a social media post that officers had cleared 85 fallen trees, 23 pieces of debris and three billboard "incidents". Marsaskala was the most affected as major floods and distracted building were reported. Għar Lapsi in the limits of Siggiewi also suffered great beating from the powerful elements leaving locals in disbelief.

According to the report, a commuter train derailed in the Vacarisses area, northwest of Barcelona (2026 Gelida train derailment), after a retaining wall collapsed onto the tracks. The train driver was killed, and dozens of passengers were injured (reports indicate between 15 and 37 people were treated). Authorities believe the wall was destabilised by the torrential rainfall associated with Storm Harry, which has been battering the region for several days.

In Tunisia, at least five people were killed as Storm Harry brought record-breaking rainfall and flooding across the coastal regions. Meteorological officials said rainfall levels in some regions were the highest recorded since 1950, reaching 206 millimetres (8.1 in) in Sidi Bou Said. The heavy rains flooded streets, submerged vehicles, and disrupted daily life, leading authorities to close schools and suspend transport and court sessions in several governorates.

Heavy flooding also occurred in Algeria. Two people, a man in his 60s and a 13-year-old girl, were killed in Chlef Province and Relizane Province. Large-scale search and rescue operations were carried out.

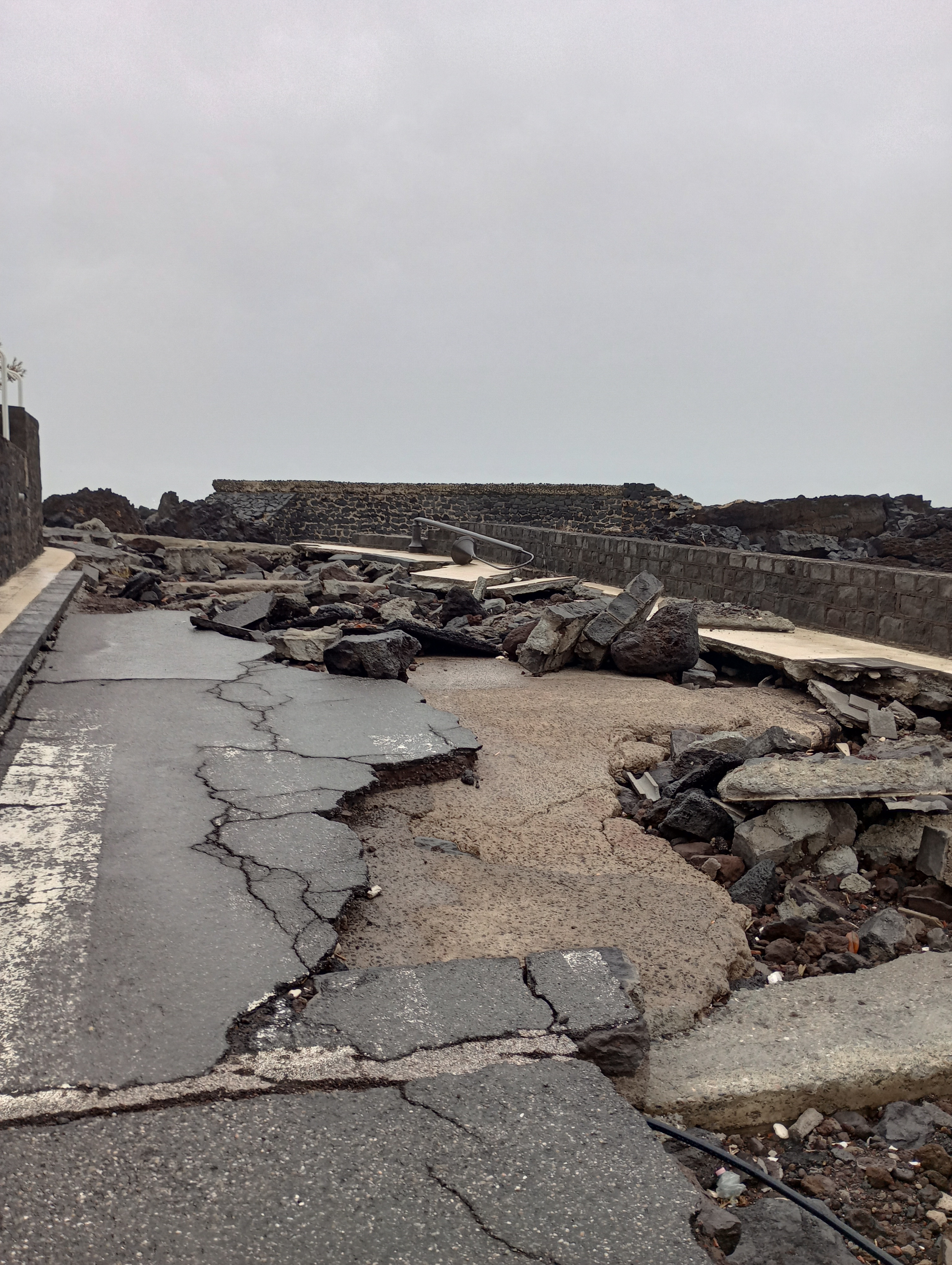
Stazzo, a small port in the comune of Acireale was badly hit by the high waves caused by the storm. Via Spiaggia on the seafront received the worst damage.

The storm caused widespread damage along the eastern coast of Sicily to property and infrastructure, leaving a number of streets impassable due to sinkholes and debris. Rail traffic was suspended for several days. However, there were no deaths. Shortly after the storm, Sicily experienced a major landslide in the town of Niscemi, caused by the long period of heavy rains and geology of the ground on which the town was built.

Italy’s coastguard estimates that 380 others who set sail from Tunisia during the cyclone, which generated huge waves in the Mediterranean, might also have drowned. It was also presumed that 1-year-old twin girls on a boat from Guinea died off the coast of Lampedusa, according to the Italian unit of UNICEF's migrant and refugee response. Following the storm, the coastguard searched for eight vessels that had been launched by people smugglers from the Tunisian port city of Sfax for at least 10 days despite the treacherous conditions.
