= Sindicato Español de Maquinistas y Ayudantes Ferroviarios =

Spanish railway workers union

Sindicato Español de Maquinistas Ferroviarios (Spanish Union of Railway Drivers), known as SEMAF, is a Spanish union which represents engine drivers of the Spanish railways, promoting their rights and interests and working for safety and efficiency of rail transport in Spain.

== History of SEMAF ==
SEMAF was founded in 1986 with the aim of representing and defending the professional interests of railway drivers in Spain. Its main mission is to ensure fair working conditions, promote the continuing education of train drivers, and safeguard safety in railway operations.

== Notable events ==
SEMAF called an engine drivers' strike in October 2021, demanding that Renfe services be maintained.

In the wake of a commuter train derailing and crashing near Barcelona with the death of a driver, and the 2026 Adamuz train derailments, SEMAF called a strike in January 2026, having notified the rail operators of concerns regarding the condition of railtracks in Spain the previous August. It was called off after intensive negotiations secured an increase in maintenance funding.

== Overarching organisations ==
SEMAF is a member of ALE (Autonome Lokomotivführer-Gewerkschaften Europas/ Federation of European Train Drivers Unions), which is a member of CESI (European Confederation of Independent Trade Unions).
