= Los Yébenes =

- Los Yébenes's ayuntamiento (city hall)

- Flag Coat of arms
- Interactive map of Los Yébenes
- Location within Spain Location within Europe
- Country: Spain
- Autonomous community: Castile-La Mancha
- Province: Toledo
- Municipality: Los Yébenes

Area
  - Total: 676 km^{2} (261 sq mi)
- Elevation: 805 m (2,641 ft)

Population (2025-01-01)
  - Total: 5,787
  - Density: 8.56/km^{2} (22.2/sq mi)
- Time zone: UTC+1 (CET)
  - Summer (DST): UTC+2 (CEST)

Los Yébenes is a municipality located in the province of Toledo, Castile-La Mancha, Spain. According to the 2006 census (INE), the municipality has a population of 6,341 inhabitants.

The Madrid–Seville high-speed rail line goes through the municipality, and the 2026 Toledo train collision occurred there.

== See also ==
- Battle of Yevenes (1809)
- 2026 Toledo train collision
