= Urda, Toledo =

Coordinates: 39°25′N 3°42′W

Urda
- municipality
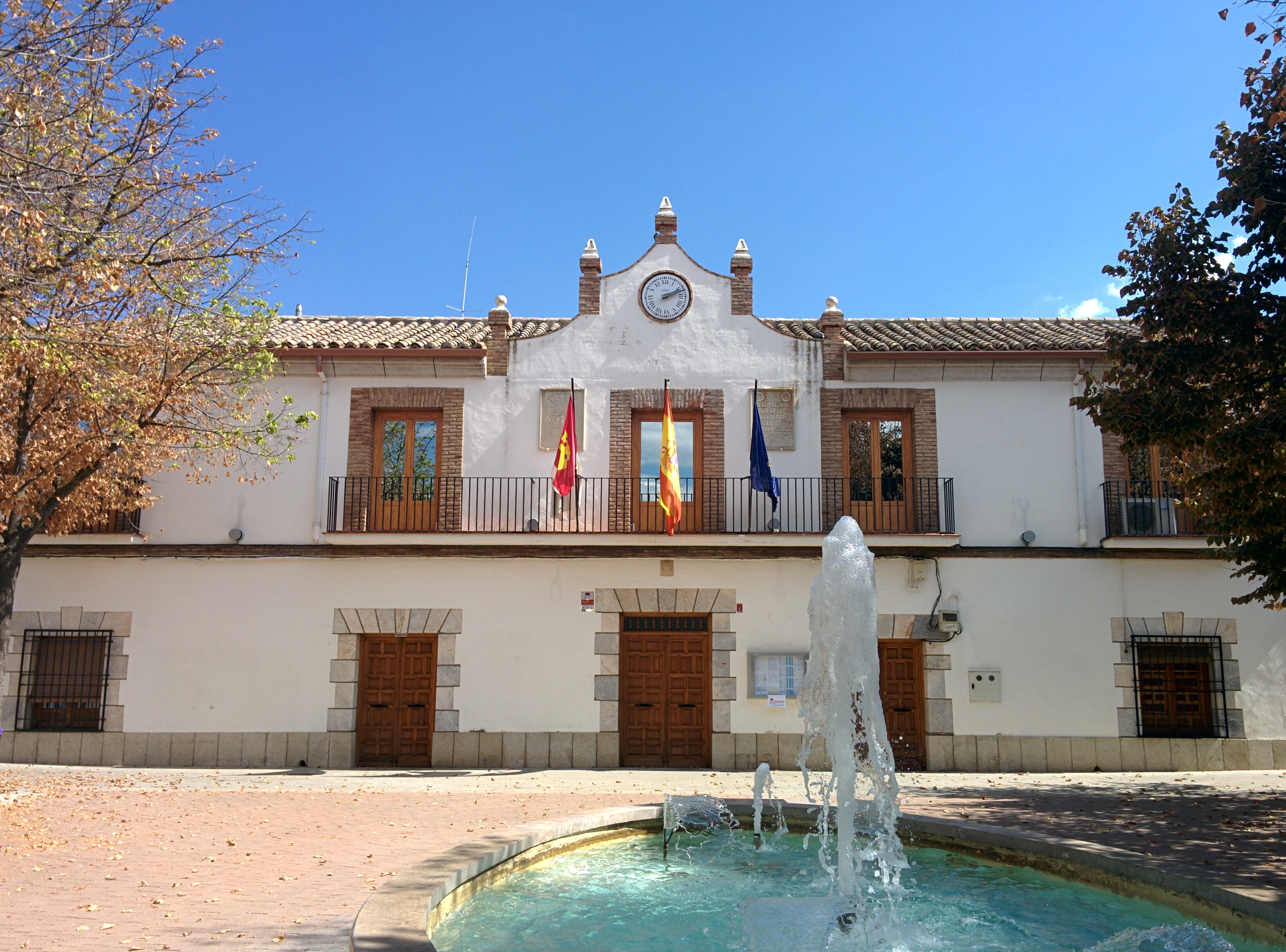

- Coat of arms
- Interactive map of Urda
- Location within Spain Location within Europe
- Country: Spain
- Autonomous community: Castile–La Mancha
- Province: Toledo
- Comarca: Montes de Toledo Comarca

Area
  - Total: 217 km^{2} (84 sq mi)
- Elevation: 763 m (2,503 ft)

Population (2025-01-01)
  - Total: 2,454
  - Density: 11.3/km^{2} (29.3/sq mi)
- Time zone: UTC+1 (CET)
  - Summer (DST): UTC+2 (CEST)

Urda is a municipality located in the province of Toledo, Castile–La Mancha, Spain.

According to the 2006 census (INE), the municipality had a population of 3164 inhabitants.

The municipality had a population of 2451 at 2025.

== History ==
The territory was inhabited by the Carpetani, which prevented the Romanization of Urda and the subsequent arrival of the Arabs. The local inhabitants served as soldiers during the Reconquista, thereby securing privileges from the monarchs.

A document from the late 18th century suggests that the settlement originated as a community of beekeepers. The extensive exploitation of beehives was likely accompanied by hunting. Urda lacks a formal charter of settlement, but it is mentioned in a 1232 agreement between the Order of Calatrava and the Order of Saint John, which identifies it as a village under the jurisdiction of Consuegra—and, by extension, the Order of Saint John. Later, in 1557, it was granted the status of "villa" (town), thereby separating from Consuegra.

By the mid-19th century, the town had a recorded population of 2,084 inhabitants, as described in the fifteenth volume of Pascual Madoz's Diccionario geográfico-estadístico-histórico de España y sus posesiones de Ultramar (Geographical-Statistical-Historical Dictionary of Spain and its Overseas Possessions).

On 28 October 2026, two trains collided on the Madrid–Seville high-speed rail line near Urda, killing at least 69 people.
