= Felipe Sicilia =

Spanish politician (born 1979)

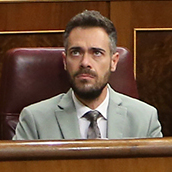
- Sicilia in 2018

Member of the Congress of Deputies
- In office 13 December 2011 – 17 August 2023
- Constituency: Jaén

Personal details
- Born: 15 December 1979 (age 46)
- Party: Spanish Socialist Workers' Party

Felipe Jesús Sicilia Alférez (born 15 December 1979) is a Spanish politician. From 2011 to 2023, he was a member of the Congress of Deputies. From 2021 to 2022, he served as spokesperson of the Spanish Socialist Workers' Party.
