= Globalvia =

Spanish multinational transport infrastructure company

- Industry: Transportation
- Founded: 2007
- Headquarters: Madrid, Spain
- Area served: Spain; United States; Ireland; Portugal; Mexico; Costa Rica; Chile; United Kingdom; Sweden; Norway; Singapore
- Key people: Javier Pérez Fortea (CEO); Juan Béjar Ochoa (Non-Executive Chairman)
- Number of employees: 30,000
- Parent: OPTrust (40.3%); PGGM (40.3%); USS (18.9%)
- Subsidiaries: Openvia (100%), Go Ahead Group (49%)
- Website: www.globalvia.com/en/

Globalvia (stylised as globalvia) is a Spanish multinational transport infrastructure company that operates in 11 countries across three continents. In June 2022, Globalvia in partnership with Kinetic Group launched a takeover bid for the British bus and rail operator Go-Ahead Group. The sale was approved by Go-Ahead's shareholders in August 2022. Globalvia has a 49% shareholding.

Globalvia is owned by OPTrust, PGGM and USS who bought Globalvia in a takeover bid worth Euro 420 million in 2015.

== History ==
In 2007 Fomento de Construcciones y Contratas (FCC) and Caja Madrid founded Globalvia to unite their shared infrastructure assets under one brand with FCC and Caja Madrid each controlling a 50% stake in the new company.

Globalvia won the private international tender to acquire two highways in Chile in 2008, and in the same year was also awarded a contract in Portugal to build and operate the Transmontana IP4 highway, thus beginning the company's expansion outside of Spain.

The company continued to expand its road infrastructure investments over the years and in 2013 expanded into the rail industry with the purchase of Metro de Sevilla, a light rail system in Seville, Spain. Later that year, Globalvia expanded into Ireland by being awarded a 5-year, €35 million contract in partnership with Sacyr to manage and operate the 161km of toll-free motorway segments in Dublin.

In 2015, OPTrusts, Stichting Pensioenfonds Zorg en Welzijn (PGGM) and Universities Superannuation Scheme (USS) purchased Globalvia for a total of €420 million.

The company entered the United States in December 2016 by successfully securing the purchase of Pocahontas Parkway located in Richmond, Virginia.

In 2020, the company founded Openvia to focus on technology and innovation platforms such as Tap&Go, Slora by Globalvia and Meep Sevilla.

In 2022, in partnership with Australian-based multinational bus operator Kinetic Group, Globalvia purchased a 49% stake in the Go-Ahead Group, a United Kingdom-based operator of buses and railway services in the UK, Singapore, Germany, Ireland and Norway.

== Operations ==
Globalvia operates a number of road infrastructure projects listed below, all of its public transport assets outside of Spain are part of Go-Ahead Group.:

=== Chile ===
- Autopista Costa Arauco
- Autopista del Aconcagua
- Autopista del Itata
- Autopista Vespucio Norte
- Túnel de San Cristóbal

=== Ireland ===
- Globalvia Jons
- M50 Concession
- N6

=== United States ===
- Pocahontas Parkway

=== Spain ===
- Autopista Central Gallega
- Iryo, a high-speed rail operator
- Concesiones de Madrid
- M-407
- Metro Barajas (Metro de Madrid Line 8)
- Metro de Sevilla
- Metros Ligeros de Madrid
- Ruta de los Pantanos
- Tramvia Metropolità (Barcelona light rail)
- Metro de Madrid Line 9
- Metro Ligero (Light Rail)
- Tranvía de Parla
- AG-55 Autoestradas de Galicia
- AG-57 Autoestradas de Galicia
- AP-15 Audenasa
- AP-66 Aucalsa
- AP-9 Audasa

=== Portugal ===
- Beira Interior
- Transmontana

=== Costa Rica ===
- Ruta 27

=== United Kingdom ===
Through its 49% shareholding in the Go-Ahead Group (UK-based), Globalvia operates public transport networks in the UK, Singapore and Ireland, and railway services in the United Kingdom, Norway and Germany.
