= Gelida =

- Municipality
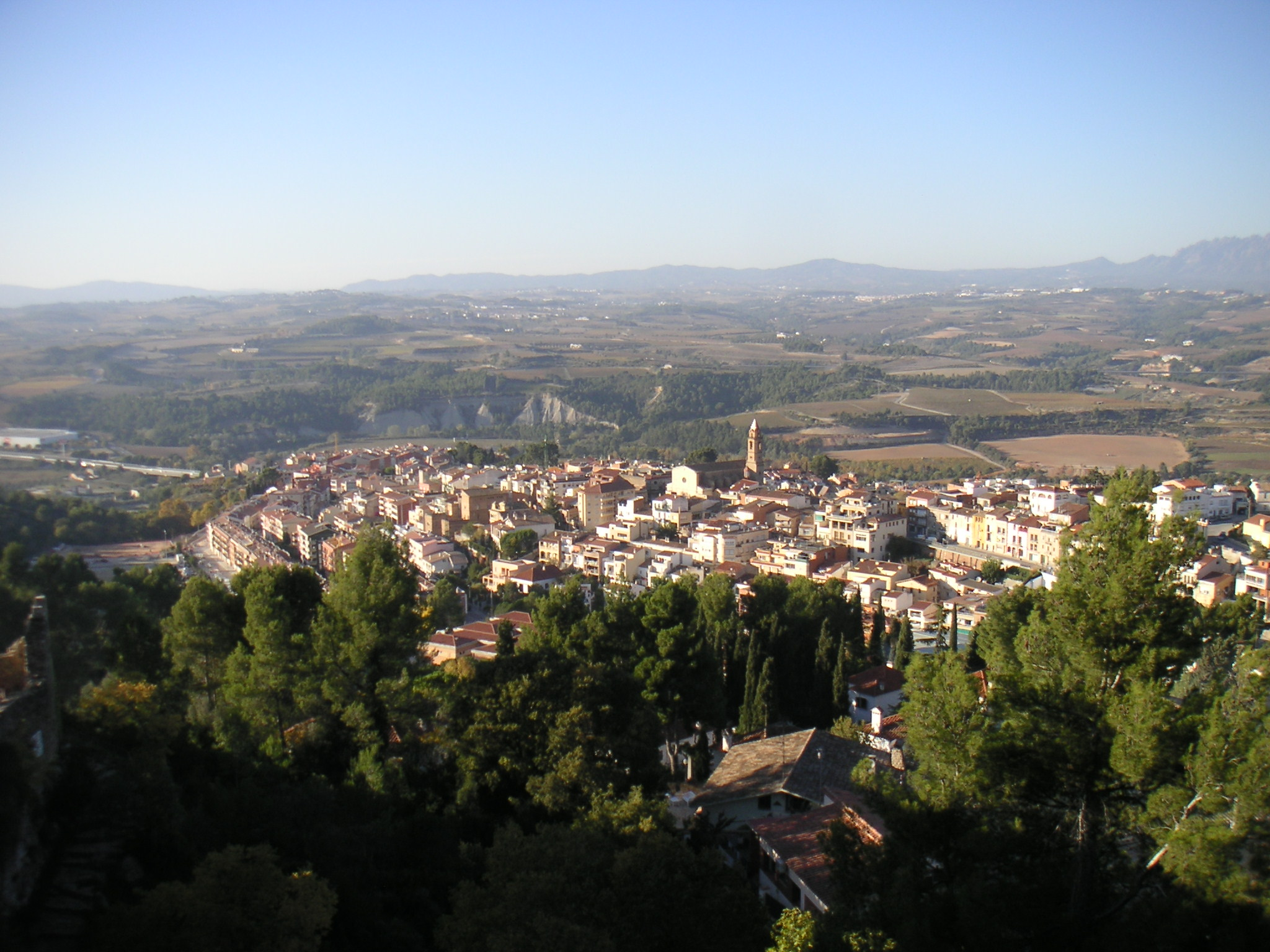
- Gelida town

- Flag Coat of arms

- Location in Catalonia Gelida (Spain)
- Coordinates: 41°26′27″N 1°51′53″E
- Country: Spain
- Community: Catalonia
- Province: Barcelona
- Comarca: Alt Penedès

Government
  - Mayor: Lluís Valls Comas (2015)

Area
  - Total: 26.7 km^{2} (10.3 sq mi)

Population (2025-01-01)
  - Total: 8,198
  - Density: 307/km^{2} (795/sq mi)
- Website: gelida.cat

Gelida (Catalan pronunciation: [ʒəˈliðə]) is a town and municipality in the comarca of Alt Penedès, Barcelona, Catalonia, Spain.

The town is built on a hillside above the Anoia river, the AP-7 motorway, and line 4 of the Barcelona commuter rail network. It is connected to its railway station via a funicular railway.

== Notable people ==
Joel Merkler : Spanish international rugby player

== See also ==
- 2026 Gelida train derailment
