= China Railway CR450BF =

Chinese high-speed EMU

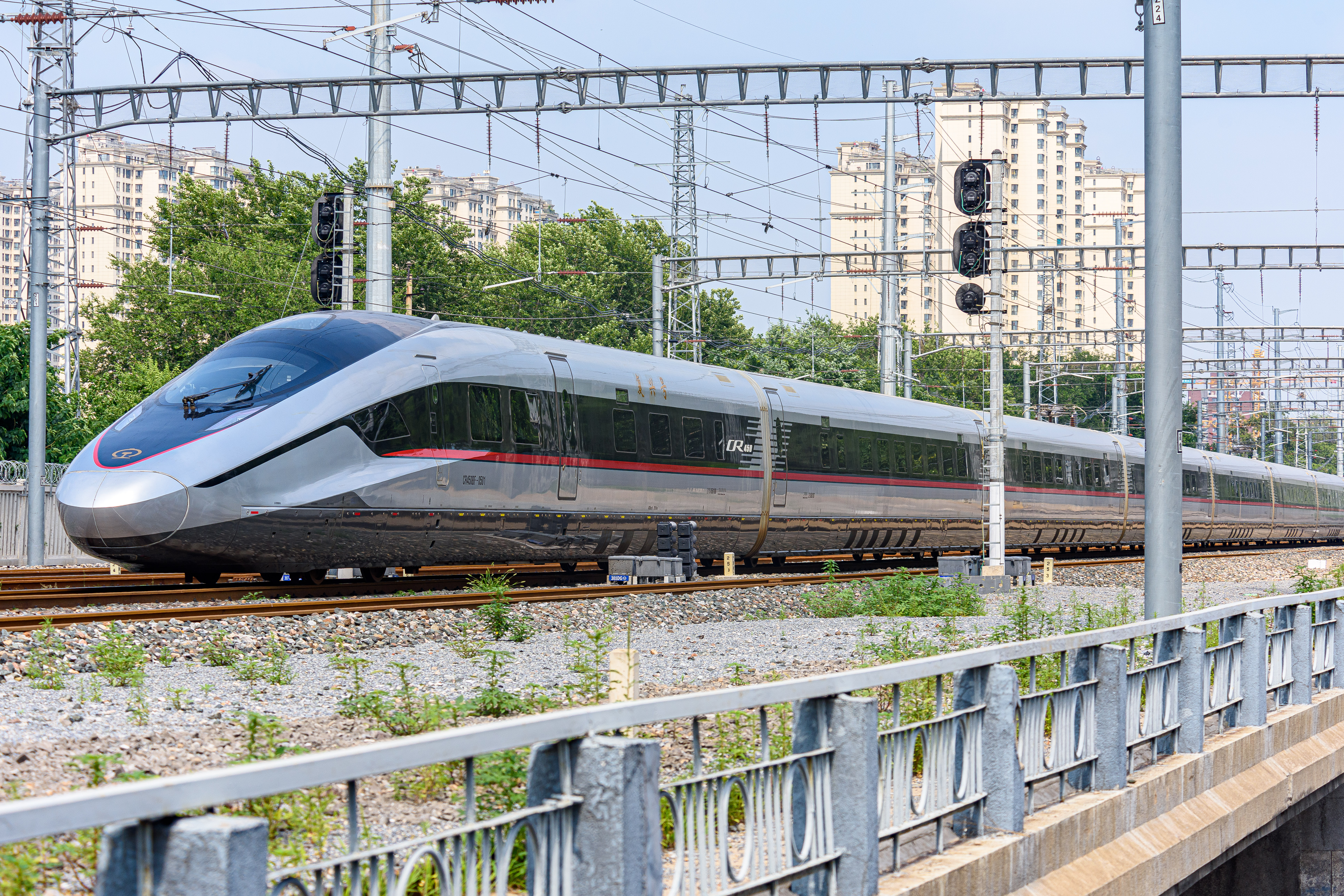
- Stock type: Electric multiple unit
- Manufacturer: CRRC Changchun Railway Vehicles
- Family name: Fuxing
- Constructed: 2024-
- Number built: 1
- Number in service: 0
- Formation: 4M4T
- Fleet numbers: CR450BF-0501
- Capacity: 552
- Operators: China Railway; China Academy of Railway Sciences

Specifications
- Train length: 211.4 metres (694 ft)
- Width: 3.36 metres (11.0 ft)
- Maximum speed: Service: 400 km/h (250 mph); Design: 450 km/h (280 mph); Record: 453 km/h (280 mph)
- Axle load: 14.5 tonnes (32,000 lb)
- Electric system: 25 kV 50 Hz AC
- Current collection: Pantograph
- UIC classification: (2’2’)(Bo’Bo’)(2’2’)(Bo’Bo’)(Bo’Bo’)(2’2’)(Bo’Bo’)(2’2’)
- Safety systems: CTCS-400T, Vigilance
- Coupling system: Scharfenberg
- Headlight type: Light Emitting Diode
- Seating: Longitudinal
- Track gauge: 1,435 mm (4 ft 8 1/2 in)

The CR450BF Fuxing (Chinese: 复兴号; pinyin: Fùxīng Hào) is a Chinese electric high-speed train manufactured by CRRC Changchun Railway Vehicles. As part of the China Standardized EMU, the CR450BF is designed to operate at speed of 400 km/h (249 mph) and a maximum test speed of 450 km/h (280 mph).

== History ==
=== 2020 ===
Drafted between 26 and 29 October on the fifth plenum of the 19th Central Committee of the CCP, the project was announced as part of China's 14th five-year plan, known as "Research and development plans for speedier bullet train".

=== 2023 ===
On June 28, test runs were conducted on the Fuzhou-Xiamen high-speed railway using two trainsets: CR400AF-J-0002 comprehensive inspection train (CIT) containing a CR450AF intermediate car, and CR400BF-J-0001 comprehensive inspection train (CIT) containing a CR450BF intermediate car. During these tests, a speed of 453 km/h (281 mph) was reached, and a relative speed of 891 km/h (554 mph) was reached, setting a new world record for the relative speed between two conventionally wheeled trains.

On June 29, the test trains ran in Haiwei tunnel and conducted a maximum speed of 420km/h for a single train a 840km/h of relative speed.

=== 2024 ===
On December 29, CRRC held a media conference in Beijing, China and officially released the two prototypes of CR450 family EMUs, CR450AF-0201 and CR450BF-0501

=== 2026 ===
On August 15, the CR450BF-0501 completed the 600,000-kilometer test and was sent back to CRRC Changchun Railway Vehicles, where it was redesignated as a dynamic inspection train.

== Design ==
According to CRRC, compared to the CR400BF, the CR450BF:

- Is 10% lighter
- Has 22% lower drag
- Consumes 20% less energy
- Retains the same 6500m braking distance from 400 km/h as CR400BF from 350 km/h.

=== Frame ===
A standard CR450BF has 8 carriages, and is made of lightweight materials such as aluminum, carbon fiber and glass fiber, of which four (cars 2/4/5/7) are power-cars and four (cars 1/3/6/8) are trailers.

Each middle car has two pairs of door at the end of the carriage, except the dining car, which only has one pair. The two lead cars on both of its ends also have two pair of doors fitted but one of them serves as the exclusive access to the driver's cab.

Two sets of pantographs are installed on trailer cars 3 and 6 for collecting current from the overhead catenaries.

Each carriage on the CR450BF has a reduced height, compared to its predecessors, therefore reducing drag by reducing the body cross section area.

=== Electrical systems ===
According to CRRC, the CR450BF has a higher traction force by using permanent-magnet synchronous motor (PMSM), which enables at least 3% higher energy conversion efficiency.

The train uses pantograph to gain 25kV 50Hz AC from the overhead catenary, which is the only type of energy source used on the China Railway network all across China.

It also has a storage battery system which can provide the train with a 110V DC power source.

=== Mechanical systems ===
The CR450BF prototype has redesigned integrated bogies, which according to CRRC, are 20% lighter than previous generations of traditional externally mounted ones seen on other Chinese high-speed EMUs. Unlike other production models, they are hidden under the side skirt of the frame with a enclosure design for better aerodynamic performance and therefore reduce drag for a better energy efficiency, similar to those seen on the Japanese Shinkansen, or the end-car of German ICE 4.

=== Interior ===
There are four classes of seating on board the CR450BF: Second Class, First Class, Premium First class and Business Class. Second Class has 482 seats in a 2-3 layout, similar to other Chinese EMUs and carriages.

First Class has 28 seats in a 2-2 layout. Compared with second class, the seats are made of leather and offer improved comfort with more width and legroom.

Premium first class has 24 seats in a 2-2 layout, and debuted in 2023 on previous CR400 trainsets. Compared with first class, it offers greater legroom and features a footrest.

The business class cabin has undergone various redesigns, consisting of three different types of seating configurations: a 6-seat classic business class setup, a business suite that accommodates six individuals, and a multi-purpose suite that offers more privacy.

== Variants ==
=== CR450BF (Prototype) ===
The first trainset built, CR450BF-0501, was first rolled out on November 26, 2024. It is designed for testing and qualification purposes.

Coach sequence of CR450BF-0501 prototype
No	Model	Type	UIC number	Class	Capacity	Length
1	ZYS	Trailer car	ZYS01xxxx	Business/Premium First	30	28550mm
2	ZES	Power car	ZES02xxxx	Second	85	25650mm
3	ZE	Trailer car (with pantograph)	ZE03xxxx	Second	90	25650mm
4	ZE	Power car	ZE04xxxx	Second	80	25650mm
5	ZEC	Power car	ZEC05xxxx	Second/Dining car	63	25650mm
6	ZE	Trailer car (with pantograph)	ZE06xxxx	Second	90	25650mm
7	ZES	Power car	ZES07xxxx	Second	80	25650mm
8	ZYS	Trailer car	ZYS08xxxx	Business/First	34	28550mm

== See also ==
- High-speed rail
- Rail transport in China
- High-speed rail in China
- Fuxing (train)
- China Railway CR450AF
- HEMU-430X
- E10 Series Shinkansen
