= China Railway CR450AF =

Chinese high speed EMU

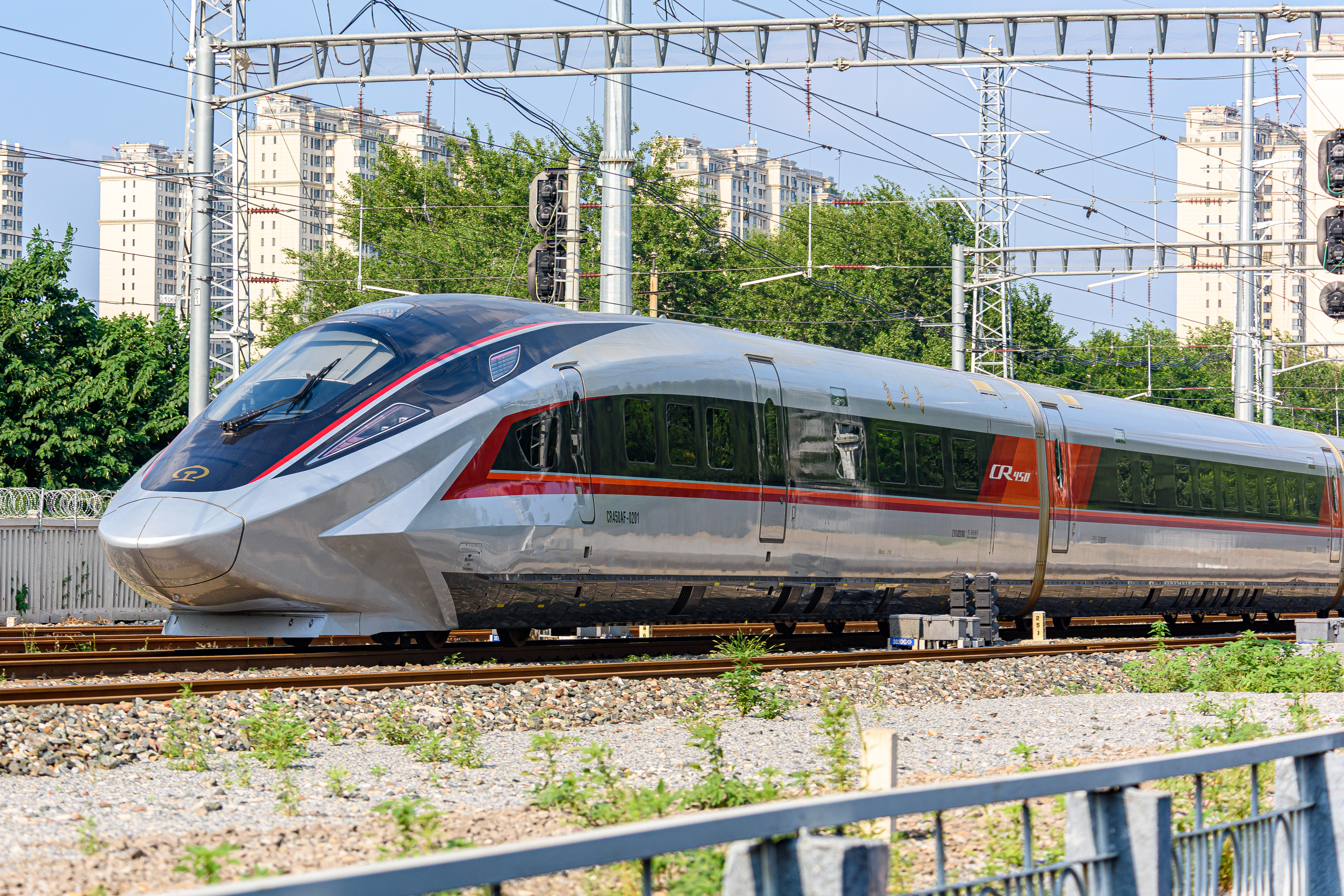
- Stock type: Electric multiple unit (EMU)
- Manufacturer: CRRC Qingdao Sifang
- Designer: Exterior: Jörn Lutter
- Family name: Fuxing
- Constructed: 2023-
- Number built: 2
- Number in service: 0
- Formation: 4M4T
- Fleet numbers: CR450AF-0201, CR450AF-A-2002
- Capacity: 552
- Operators: China Railway; China Academy of Railway Sciences

Specifications
- Train length: 211 metres (692 ft)
- Car length: 28.55m (End car) 25m (Middle car)
- Width: 3.36 metres (11.0 ft)
- Maximum speed: Service: 400 km/h (250 mph); Design: 450 km/h (280 mph); Record: 453 km/h (280 mph)
- Axle load: 14.5 tonnes (32,000 lb)
- Electric system: 25 kV 50 Hz AC
- Current collection: Pantograph
- UIC classification: (2’2’)(Bo’Bo’)(2’2’)(Bo’Bo’)(Bo’Bo’)(2’2’)(Bo’Bo’)(2’2’)
- Safety systems: CTCS-400T, Vigilance
- Coupling system: Scharfenberg
- Headlight type: Light Emitting Diode
- Seating: Longitudinal
- Track gauge: 1,435 mm (4 ft 8 1/2 in)

The CR450AF Fuxing (simplified Chinese: 复兴号; traditional Chinese: 復興號; pinyin: Fùxīng Hào) is a prototype Chinese electric high-speed train manufactured by CRRC Qingdao Sifang. As part of the China Standardized EMU family, the CR450AF has an operating speed of 400 km/h (249 mph) and a maximum design speed of 450 km/h (280 mph). Once in service, it will be one of two trains that have the highest operating speed in the world, with the other being CR450BF.

== Development ==
=== 2020 ===
Drafted between 26 and 29 October on the fifth plenum of the 19th Central Committee of the CCP, the project was announced as part of China's 14th five-year plan, known as "Research and development plans for speedier bullet train".

=== 2023 ===
On June 28, test runs were conducted on the Fuzhou-Xiamen high-speed railway using two trainsets: CR400AF-J-0002, a comprehensive inspection train (CIT) containing a CR450AF intermediate car, and CR400BF-J-0001, a comprehensive inspection train containing a CR450BF intermediate car. During these tests, a speed of 453 km/h (281 mph) was reached, and a relative speed of 891 km/h (554 mph) was reached, setting a new world record for the relative speed between two conventionally wheeled trains.

On June 29, test runs through the Haiwei tunnel were conducted. During these tests, a speed of 420 km/h (260 mph) was reached, and a relative passing speed of 840 km/h (520 mph) was recorded.

=== 2024 ===
On December 29, after 3 years of the development, CRRC held a press conference at the China Academy of Railway Sciences (CARS) site in Northeast Beijing, China, where it officially announced the two prototypes of CR450 family: the CR450AF-0201 and CR450BF-0501.

=== 2025 ===
The CR450AF is expected to be delivered to China Railway in 2025, enter regular service thereafter on existing high-speed lines which limits the operating speed to 350km/h due to line limitations.

=== 2026 ===
On August 15, the CR450AF-0201 completed the 600,000-kilometer test and was sent back to CRRC Qingdao Sifang, where it was redesignated as a dynamic inspection train.

=== Future ===
It is expected that in 2026 it will be deployed on the Beijing-Shanghai line. In 2027 it will be deployed on the 292 km long Second Chengdu-Chongqing high-speed railway which is expected to be finished by then, where it can reach its designed highest operating speed 400 km/h (250 mph) and shorten the travel time between the two cities to less than 50 minutes.

== Design ==
According to CRRC, compared to the CR400AF, the CR450AF:

- Is 10% lighter
- Has 22% lower aerodynamic drag
- Consumes 20% less energy
- Retains the same 6,500 m (21,300 ft) stopping distance from 450 km/h (280 mph) as the CR400AF from 350 km/h (220 mph)

=== Frame ===
A standard CR450AF has 8 carriages, made of lightweight materials like aluminum, carbon fiber and glass fiber. Four of the cars (cars 2/4/5/7) are power-cars and the other four (cars 1/3/6/8) are trailer-cars.

Each middle car has two pairs of doors at the end of the carriage, except the dining car, which only has one pair. The two lead cars on both of its ends also have two pair of doors fitted but one of them serves as the exclusive access to the driver's cab.

Two sets of pantographs are installed on unpowered trailer car 3 and 6 for collecting current from the overhead catenaries.

The height of the carriages are reduced on the CR450AF compared to its predecessors, which reduced drags by reducing the body cross section area.

=== Electrical systems ===
According to CRRC, the CR450AF has a higher traction force by using permanent-magnet synchronous motor (PMSM), which enables at least 3% higher energy conversion efficiency.

The train uses pantograph to gain 25 kV 50 Hz AC from the overhead catenary, which is the only type of energy source used on the China Railway network all across China.

It also has a storage battery system which can provide the train with a 110 V DC power source.

=== Mechanical systems ===
The CR450AF prototype has redesigned integrated bogies, which according to CRRC, are 20% lighter than previous generations of traditional externally mounted ones seen on other Chinese high-speed EMUs. Unlike other production models, they are hidden under the side skirt of the frame with a enclosure design for better aerodynamic performance and therefore reduce drag for a better energy efficiency, similar to those seen on the Japanese Shinkansen, or the end-car of German ICE 4.

=== Interior ===
There are four classes of seating on board the CR450AF: Second Class, First Class, Premium First class and Business Class. Second Class has 482 seats in a 2-3 layout, similar to other Chinese EMUs and carriages.

First Class has 28 seats in a 2-2 layout. Compared with second class, the seats are made of leather and offer improved comfort with more width and legroom.

Premium first class has 24 seats in a 2-2 layout, and debuted in 2023 on previous CR400 trainsets. Compared with first class, it offers greater legroom and features a footrest.

The business class cabin has undergone various redesigns, consisting of three different types of seating configurations: a 6-seat classic business class setup, a business suite that accommodates six individuals, and a multi-purpose suite that offers more privacy.

== Variants ==
=== CR450AF (Prototype) ===
The first trainset to be built, the CR450AF-0201, was first rolled out on November 26, 2024. It is designed for testing and qualification purposes.

Coach sequence of CR450AF-0201
No	Model	Type	UIC number	Class	Capacity	Length
1	ZYS	Trailer car	ZYS01xxxx	Business/Premium First	30	28550mm
2	ZES	Power car	ZES02xxxx	Business/Second	85	25650mm
3	ZE	Trailer car (with pantograph)	ZE03xxxx	Second	90	25650mm
4	ZE	Power car	ZE04xxxx	Second	80	25650mm
5	ZEC	Power car	ZEC05xxxx	Second/Dining car	63	25650mm
6	ZE	Trailer car (with pantograph)	ZE06xxxx	Second	90	25650mm
7	ZES	Power car	ZES07xxxx	Business/Second	80	25650mm
8	ZYS	Trailer car	ZYS08xxxx	Business/First	34	28550mm

== See also ==
- High-speed rail
- Rail transport in China
- High-speed rail in China
- Fuxing (train)
- China Railway CR450BF
- HEMU-430X
- E10 Series Shinkansen
