= China Railway =

State-owned national railway company of China

China State Railway Group Company, Ltd.
- Logo of China Railway

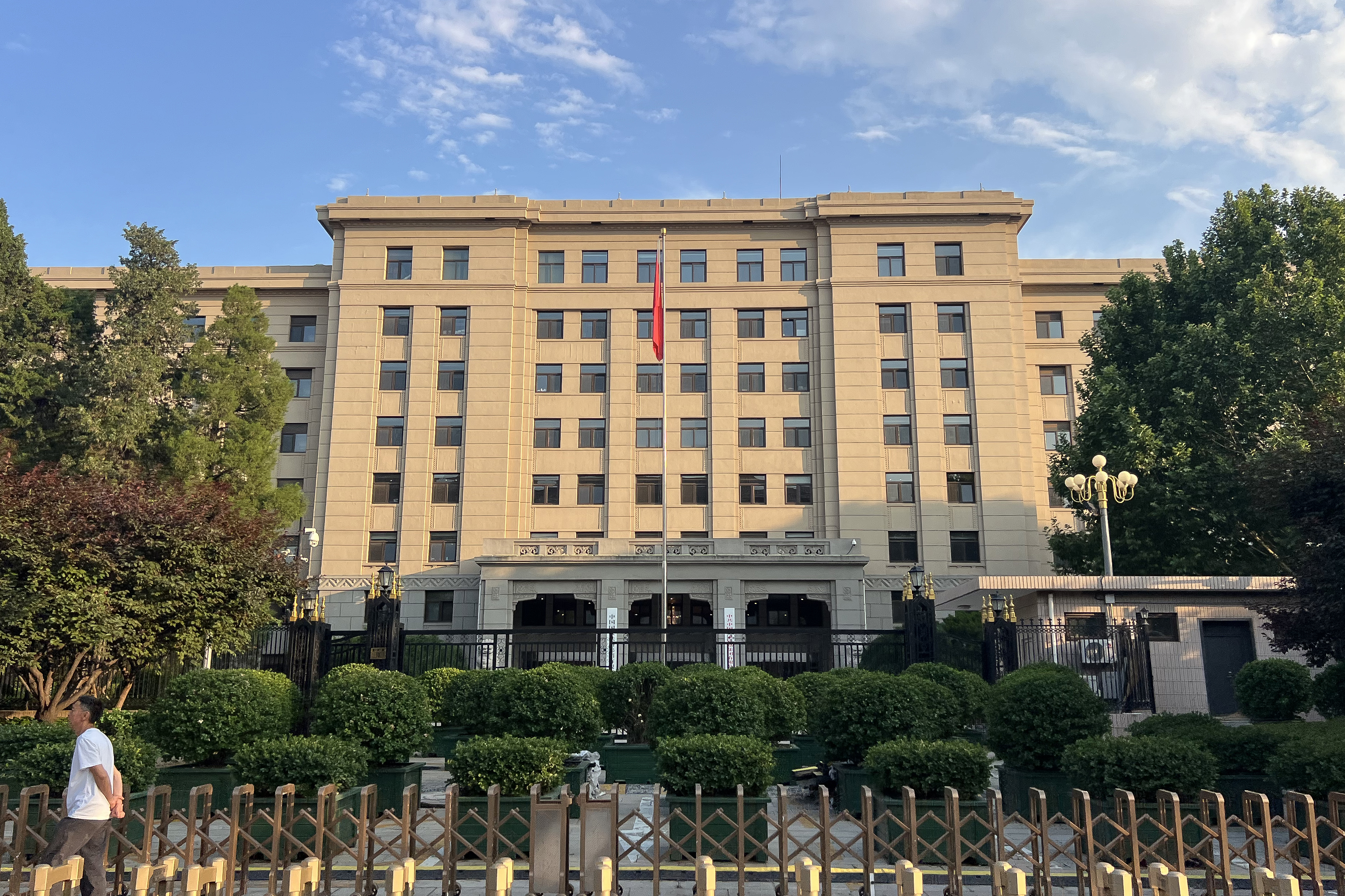
- Headquarters
- Trade name: China Railway
- Native name: 中国国家铁路集团有限公司
- Formerly: China Railway Corporation (2013–2019)
- Type: State-owned limited company
- Industry: Rail transport
- Predecessor: Ministry of Railways
- Founded: 19 January 1950 (as ministry); 14 March 2013 (as company)
- Headquarters: Haidian, Beijing, China
- Area served: China
- Key people: Guo Zhuxue (Chairman); Song Xiude (General Manager)
- Services: Passenger rail Freight rail
- Revenue: ▲US$178.3 billion (2024)
- Net income: ▲US$539 million (2024)
- Total assets: ▲US$1.357 trillion (2024)
- Total equity: ▲US$495.1 billion (2024)
- Owner: Ministry of Finance
- Number of employees: 2 million approx. (2013)
- Divisions: Railway operations
- Subsidiaries: 16 bureaux 5 companies
- Website: china-railway.com.cn; 12306.cn

China State Railway Group Co., Ltd.
- Simplified Chinese: 中国国家铁路集团有限公司
- Traditional Chinese: 中國國家鐵路集團有限公司
- Literal meaning: China State Railway Group Limited Company
Transcriptions
Standard Mandarin
- Hanyu Pinyin: Zhōngguó Guójiā Tiělù Jítuán Yǒuxiàngōngsī
- Wade–Giles: Chung-kuo Kuo-chia Tʻieh-lu Chi-tʻuan Yu-hsien-kung-ssŭ

Alternative Chinese name
- Simplified Chinese: 国铁集团
- Traditional Chinese: 國鐵集團
- Literal meaning: State Railway Group
Transcriptions
Standard Mandarin
- Hanyu Pinyin: Guó Tiě Jítuán
- Wade–Giles: Kuo Tʻieh Chi-tʻuan

China State Railway Group Co., Ltd. (中国国家铁路集团有限公司), doing business as China Railway (CR; 中国铁路), is the state-owned rail transport operator and rail infrastructure manager corporation of China.

China Railway operates passenger and freight transport throughout China with 18 regional bureaus. China has the highest railway ridership in the world.

== History ==
China Railway Corporation was established in 2013 to be responsible for railroad construction, operation, and maintenance.

Under the Chinese Corporate Law, China Railway Corporation was reorganized into China State Railway Group Co., Ltd. on 18 June 2019. This meant the Ministry of Finance would act as an investor on behalf of the state and the company would be led by a board and managed by board-chosen executives.

By the end of 2019, China Railway employed 2 million people and operated 139,900 km of railroads, of which 35,388 are high-speed railroads.

== Passenger services ==
China Railway operates two main types of passenger rail services. Tickets for both types of trains are sold offline at ticket offices using the only national Ticketing and Reservation System (TRS), and online at China Railway's official online booking website, 12306.cn, and its associated mobile app, Railway 12306 (with both a Chinese interface and an English interface for use by foreigners). 12306.cn (and its app) is the only official online platform authorized to sell China Railway tickets.

=== China Railway High-speed (CRH) ===
China Railway High-speed (CRH) is a high-speed rail service operated by China Railway.

The introduction of CRH series was a major part of the sixth national railway speedup, implemented on April 18, 2007. By the end of 2020, China Railway High-speed provided service to all provinces in China, and operated just under 38,000 km (24,000 mi) passenger tracks in length, accounting for about two-thirds of the world's high-speed rail tracks in commercial service. China has revealed plans to extend the HSR to 70,000 km by year 2035. It is the world's most extensively used railway service, with 2.29 billion bullet train trips delivered in 2019 and 2.16 billion trips in 2020, bringing the total cumulative number of trips to 13 billion as of 2020.

In total, CRH operates over 3300 sets of rolling stock. Of which, over 1000 sets are Hexie trains including CRH1/2A/5 that are designed to have a maximum speed of 250 km/h (160 mph), and CRH2C/3 have a maximum speed of 350 km/h (220 mph). The indigenous designed CRH380A reached a maximum test speed of 416.6 km/h (258.9 mph) with commercial operation speed of 350 km/h. The 16 car variant, CRH380AL, additionally reached 486.1 km/h (302.0 mph). The fastest train set, CRH380BL, attained a maximum test speed of 487.3 km/h (302.8 mph). The remaining 2300 some sets are newer generation Fuxing trains. In 2017, the China Standardized EMU brand including CR400AF/BF and CR200J joined China Railway High-speed and are designated as Fuxing together with letters CR (China Railway). Since then, many variants have been introduced covering a wide range of speeds from 160 km/h to 350 km/h. The CR brand is gradually replacing the current CRH brand in service. As of 2026, the CR450AF/BF, designed to be the first conventional trains to operate at 400 km/h, are undergoing testing on various newly constructed lines.

Depending on their speed, there are 3 categories of high speed trains: G, D and C. Most G trains and some C trains operate at 350 km/h, the fasted speed. D trains have a top speed of 250 km/h while most C trains have a top speed of 200 km/h.

=== China Railway Classic Rail ===
The China Railway Classic Rail network (Chinese: 普速铁路; pinyin: Pǔ sù tiělù), also known as conventional rail, forms the backbone of China Railway's railway system alongside the high-speed rail (HSR) network. These traditional railway lines operate at speeds below 160 km/h (99 mph) and serve a dual role in transporting both passengers and freight. Unlike the high-speed CRH (China Railway High-speed) services, which primarily use dedicated electrified tracks, Classic Rail consists of older lines that may be single or double-tracked, with varying degrees of electrification.

Historically, all Classic Rail trains were olive-green, leading to the nickname "green train" (Chinese: 绿皮火车; pinyin: Lǜ pí huǒche) to be used by laypeople. Since 2014, most Classic Rail trains that had other colours (white, red, blue) have been repainted olive-green. Classic Rail trains are also sometimes referred to as "slow trains" in English.

Classic Rail trains have significantly lower ticket prices compared to CRH trains and are a popular choice with travellers on a budget.

== Logo ==
Logos of China Railway

China Railway symbol (used for all services, including Classic Rail)

China Railway High-speed logo (used on Hexie trains)

Fuxing train logo

Former company logo

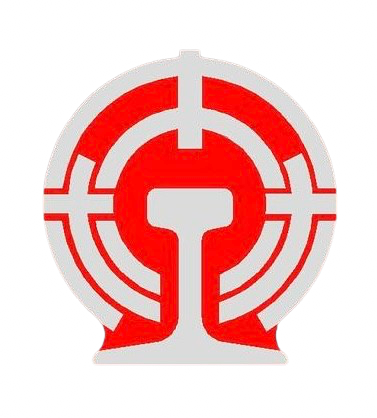
China Railway forestry logo (used on C2 locomotives)

The China Railway logo was designed by Chen Yuchang (Chinese: 陈玉昶) (1912–1969), officially adopted on 22 January 1950. The whole logo represents the front of a locomotive. The upper part of the logo represents the Chinese character 人 (rén, people). While the lower part represents the transversal surface of a rail as well as the character 工 (gōng, labour). Together, the logo emphasizes that China's railway belongs to working class people because of their labour.

The "CR" logo is used on the Fuxing (train) along with the China Railway logo. The "CRH" logo is used on the Hexie (train). On most C2 forestry locomotives, an adapted China Railway logo with a stylised version of the character 林 (lín, forest) is featured on a cast emblem.

== Companies ==
CR service regions

There are 21 primary subsidiary companies under China Railway. As of 2008, approximately two million people work in China Railway.

Business	Company	Provinces of operation	Regions of operation
Passenger	China Railway Harbin Group Company (CR Harbin)	Northeastern Inner Mongolia (Hulunbuir and part of Xingan League), Heilongjiang	Northeast China
Passenger	China Railway Shenyang Group Company (CR Shenyang)	Liaoning (except Bohai Strait ferry), Jilin, Southeastern Inner Mongolia (Chifeng, Tongliao and part of Xingan League), southern Heilongjiang, northeastern Hebei	Northeast China
Passenger	China Railway Beijing Group Company (CR Beijing)	Beijing, Hebei (most parts), Tianjin, western Shandong, northern Henan, eastern Shanxi, with all the exception of Daqin Railway	North China
Passenger	China Railway Hohhot Group Company (CR Hohhot)	Inner Mongolia (most parts)	North China
Passenger	China Railway Taiyuan Group Company (CR Taiyuan)	Shanxi, also operates Daqin Railway through sub-company	North China
Passenger	China Railway Jinan Group Company (CR Jinan)	Shandong (includes Bohai Strait ferry)	East China
Passenger	China Railway Shanghai Group Company (CR Shanghai)	Shanghai, Jiangsu, Zhejiang, Anhui (most parts)	East China
Passenger	China Railway Nanchang Group Company (CR Nanchang)	Jiangxi, Fujian	East China
Passenger	China Railway Guangzhou Group Company (CR Guangzhou)	Hainan, most parts of Guangdong and Hunan	South China
Passenger	China Railway Nanning Group Company (CR Nanning)	Guangxi, western Guangdong	South China
Passenger	China Railway Wuhan Group Company (CR Wuhan)	Hubei, southern Henan, a little part of Anhui	Central China
Passenger	China Railway Zhengzhou Group Company (CR Zhengzhou)	Henan (middle and northern parts), southern Shanxi	Central China
Passenger	China Railway Chengdu Group Company (CR Chengdu)	Sichuan (most parts), Chongqing, Guizhou (most parts), a little part of Yunnan	Southwest China
Passenger	China Railway Kunming Group Company (CR Kunming)	Yunnan (most parts), a little part of Sichuan and Guizhou	Southwest China
Passenger	China Railway Qingzang Group Company (CR Qingzang)	Tibet	Southwest China
Passenger	China Railway Qingzang Group Company (CR Qingzang)	Qinghai	Northwest China
Passenger	China Railway Lanzhou Group Company (CR Lanzhou)	Gansu (most parts), Ningxia, a little part of Inner Mongolia	Northwest China
Passenger	China Railway Ürümqi Group Company (CR Ürümqi)	Xinjiang, a little part of Gansu	Northwest China
Passenger	China Railway Xi'an Group Company (CR Xi'an)	Shaanxi (most parts), northeast Sichuan	Northwest China
Freight	China Railway Special Cargo Service Company (CRSCS)	Nationwide	
Freight	China Railway Express Company (CRE)	Nationwide	
Freight	China Railway Container Transport Company (CRCT)	Nationwide	

=== Second tier subsidiaries ===
Parent	Subsidiary	Operational line
CR Guangzhou	Guangshen Railway Company	Guangzhou–Shenzhen railway
CR Guangzhou	Guangmeishan Railway Company	Guangzhou–Meizhou–Shantou railway
CR Guangzhou	Sanmao Company	Sanshui–Maoming railway
CR Guangzhou	Shichang Railway Company	Shimen–Changsha railway
CR Guangzhou	Yuehai Railway Company	Guangdong–Hainan railway
CR Kunming	Shuibai Railway Company	Liupanshui–Baiguo railway
CR Nanchang	Wuyishan Railway Company	Hengfeng–Nanping railway
CR Nanchang	Quanzhou Railway Company	Zhangping–Longyan–Kanshi railway
CR Nanchang	Longyan Railway Company	Zhangping–Quanzhou–Xiaocuo railway
CR Nanchang	Xiamen Haicang Railway Company	Haicang branch railway
CR Shanghai	Xiaoyong Railway Company	Xiaoshan–Ningbo railway
CR Shanghai	Hejiu Railway Company	Hefei–Jiujiang railway
CR Shanghai	Xinchang Railway Company	Xinyi–Changxing railway
CR Shanghai	Jinwen Railway Company	Jinhua–Wenzhou railway
CR Shanghai	Ningqi Railway Company	Nanjing–Qidong railway
CR Shanghai	Ninghe Railway Company	Hefei–Nanjing passenger railway
CR Shanghai	Hewu Railway Company	Hefei–Wuhan railway
CR Taiyuan	Daqin Railway Company	Datong–Qinhuangdao railway
CR Wuhan	Huhanrong Railway Hubei Company	Shanghai–Wuhan–Chengdu high-speed railway (Hubei section)
CR Wuhan	Luofu Railway Company	Luohe–Fuyang railway
CR Xi'an	Xiyan Railway Company	Xi'an–Yan'an railway
CR Zhengzhou	Anli Branch Line Company	Anyang–Lizhen railway
CR Zhengzhou	Tanghe Branch Line Company	Tangyin–Hebi railway

== Corporate affairs ==
=== Business trends ===
The key trends for the China Railway are (as of the financial year ending 31; all in CNY),

	2021	2022	2023
Revenue	1.13	1.13	1.25
Operating income	-34.8	−54.4	27.47
Net income	−49.9	−69.6	3.30
Total assets	8.92	9.20	9.53
Total equity	3.00	3.09	3.22
Ref.			

== Partnership with Airlines ==
China Railway has codeshare agreements with the following airlines:

- Air China
- China Eastern Airlines

China Railway has Interline agreements with the following airlines:

- XiamenAir

== International operations ==
=== International trains ===
China Railway International Group Co., Ltd (CRIG) operates passenger trains from China to Mongolia, Russia, Kazakhstan, North Korea, Vietnam and Laos.

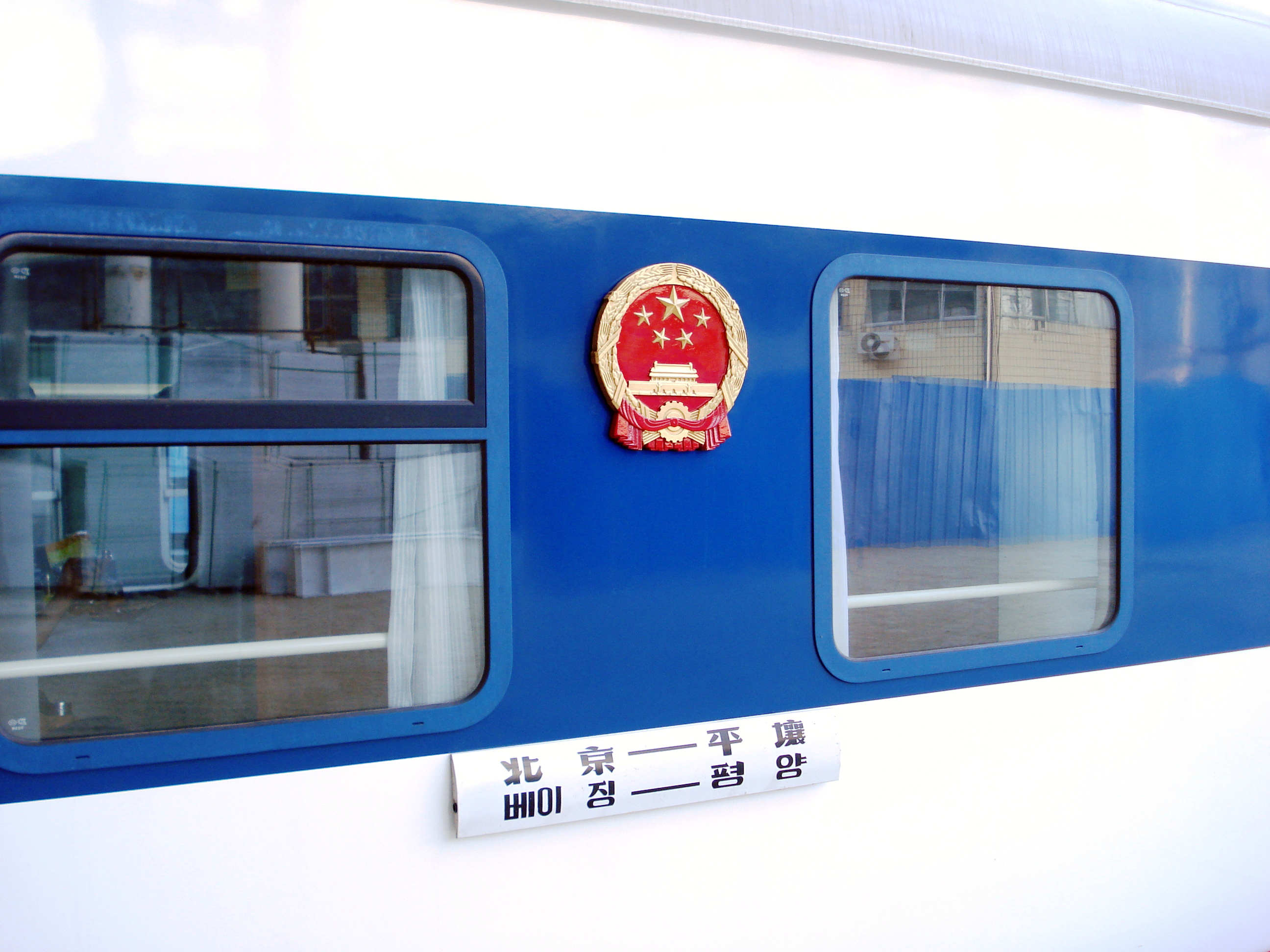
The Beijing–Pyongyang passenger train with the emblem of China

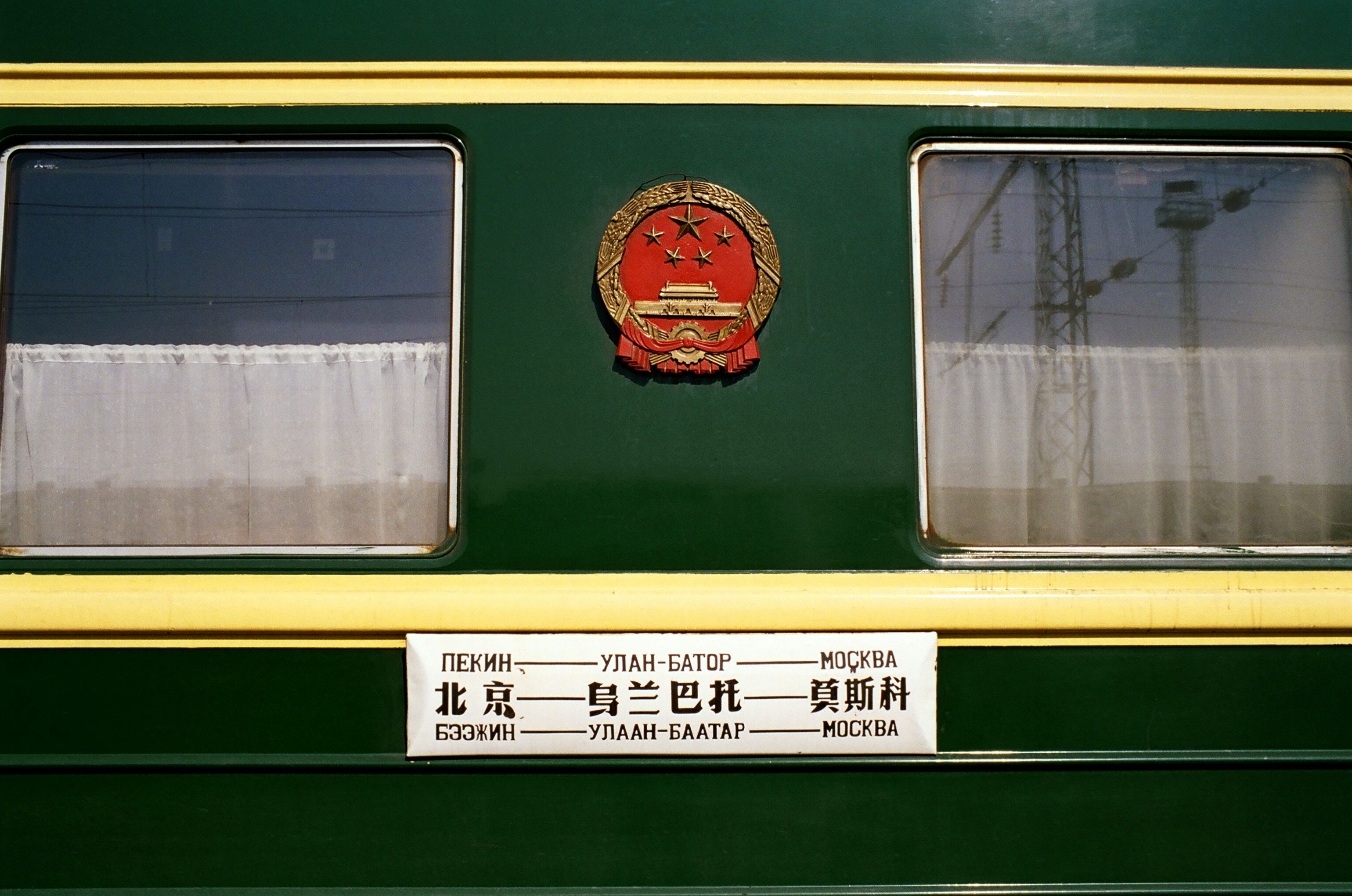
The Beijing–UlaanBaatar–Moscow passenger train

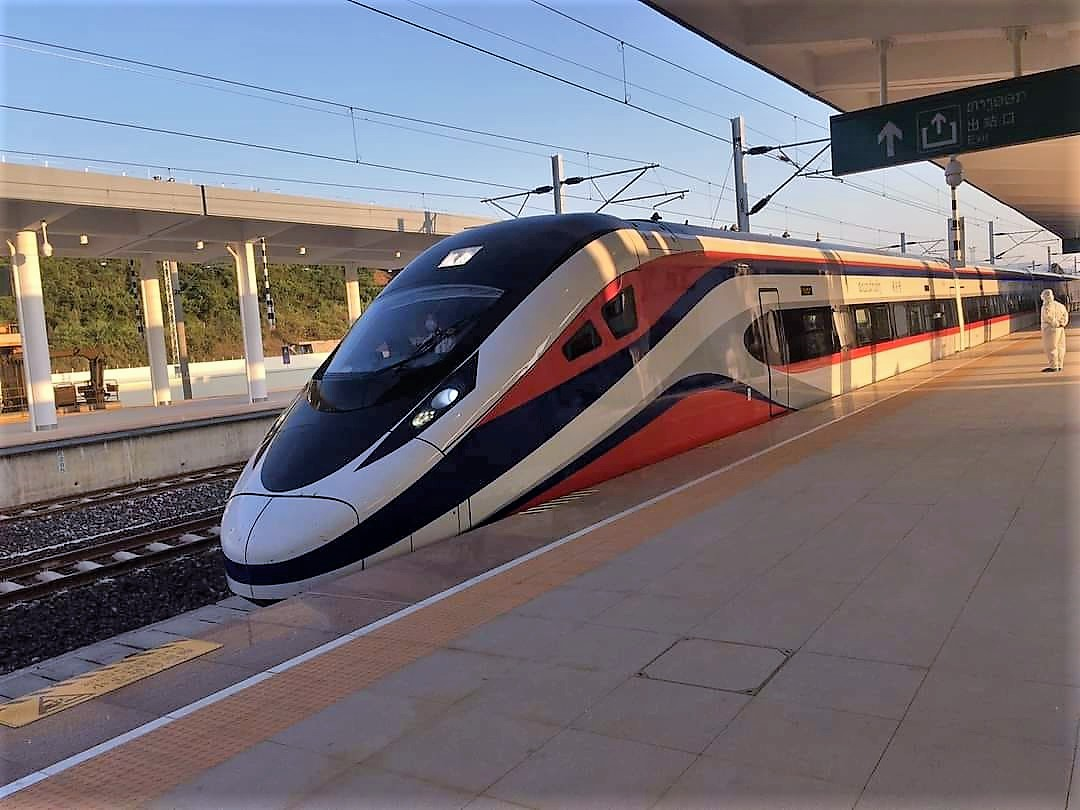
The Kunming South–Vientiane passenger train

=== Services to Europe (New Silk Route) ===
As of 2017 China Railway ran goods services to 15 European cities, including routes to Madrid and Hamburg and the experimental East Wind service to London to test demand. The Chinese government refers to the two-week 12,000 km (7,500 mi) route, starting at Yiwu and with trains to London traversing Kazakhstan, Russia, Belarus, Poland, Germany, Belgium and France, as the Belt and Road Initiative. Containers must be transferred several times, as different, incompatible, rail gauges are used in different regions, and the same rolling stock cannot be used throughout.

=== Africa ===
China has been investing in and helping to rebuild railways in Africa. Below is an incomplete list of rail projects.

Name	Location	Constructed	Company	Cost	Comments & Ref
High Plateau line, Algeria	Relizane, Saida, Tiaret, Tissemsilt, Boughezoul to M'Sila, Algeria	2009–2013	China Railway Group & China Civil Engineering Construction Corporation	US$2.8bn	
Benguela Railway	Lobito to Luau, Angola	2006–2014	China Railway Construction Corporation Limited	US$1.83bn	Railway was rebuilt following civil war
Chad Railway	Ngaoundéré, Cameroon to Nyala, Sudan via Moundou, N'Djamena and Abéché in Chad	2012–ongoing	China Civil Engineering Construction Corporation	US$5.6bn	Construction over three phases
Addis Ababa–Djibouti Railway	Addis Ababa, Ethiopia to Djibouti City, Djibouti	2011–2016	China Railway Group & China Civil Engineering Construction Corporation	US$4bn	Electric
Mombasa-Nairobi Railway	Mombasa to Nairobi, Kenya (extended to Naivasha, Kenya in 2016	2014–2017	China Communications Construction	US$3.6bn	
Kenya–Uganda border	Naivasha, Kisumu to Malaba, Kenya	2016–ongoing	China Road and Bridge Corporation (subsidiary of China Communications Construction)	US$5.42bn	
Mali–Guinea Railway	Bamako, Mali to Conakry, Guinea	2016–ongoing	China Railway Construction Corporation Limited	US$8bn	
Mali–Senegal Railway	Bamako, Mali to Dakar, Senegal	2016–ongoing	China Railway Construction Corporation Limited	US$2.7bn	
Nigeria Coastal Railway	Lagos to Calabar, Nigeria	2014–ongoing	China Civil Engineering Construction Corporation	US$11.1bn	
Lagos–Kano Railway	Lagos to Kano, Nigeria	2011–ongoing, Abuja to Kajuna completed in 2016	China Civil Engineering Construction Corporation	US$8.3bn	
Sudan Railway	Khartoum to Port Sudan, Sudan	2007–2012, 2014 opened	China Railway Engineering Corporation	US$1.5bn	
TAZARA Railway	Dar es Salaam, Tanzania to Kapiri Mposhi, Zambia	1970–1975	Railway Engineering Corps (now CRCC), Ministry of Railways (now CCECC)	US$500m	Currently in need of reinvestment
Uganda Railway	Malaba, Kampala, Kasese, Uganda to Rwanda and South Sudan	2015–ongoing	China Harbour Engineering (subsidiary of China Communications Construction)	US$8bn	

== List of directors general ==
=== China Railway Corporation ===
- Sheng Guangzu (2013–2016)
- Lu Dongfu (2016–2018)

=== China State Railway Group ===
==== Chairman ====
- Lu Dongfu (2018–2022)
- Liu Zhenfang (2022–2024)
- Guo Zhuxue (2024–present)

==== General Manager ====
- Yang Yudong (2018–2022)
- Guo Zhuxue (2022–2024)
- Song Xiude (2024–present)

== See also ==
- Rail transport in China
- List of locomotives in China
- Passenger rail transport in China
- High-speed rail in China
- China Railway High-speed
- China Railway Construction Corporation
- China Railway DF
- China Railway DF4
- China Railway DFH shunting locomotives
- China Railway CR400AF
- China Railway CR400BF
- China Railway CRH2
- MTR
