= China Railway CR400BF =

Chinese high-speed train model

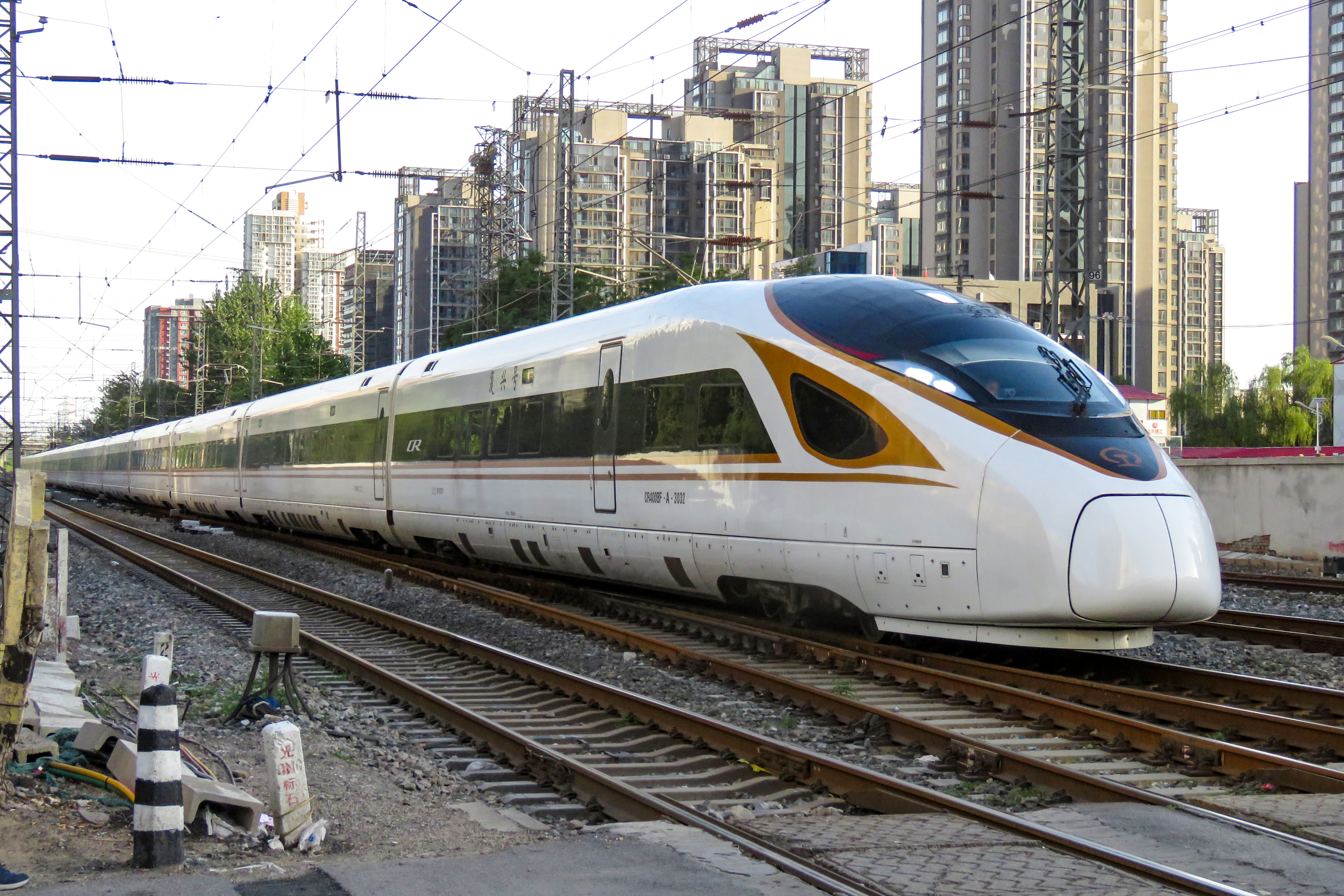
- CR400BF-A-3032 departing from depot at Guangnan, Beijing as G509
- Stock type: Electric multiple unit
- In service: BF: 15 August 2016; BF-A: 12 June 2018; BF–B: 5 January 2019; BF–G: 9 June 2019; BF–C: 30 December 2019; BF–Z, BF–GZ, BF–BZ: 25 June 2021; BF–AZ: 20 July 2022; BF–BS: 15 June 2024; BF–AS: May 2025
- Manufacturer: CRRC Changchun Railway Vehicles
- Designers: (Australia) Exterior: Industrial Design Alliance (iDA); (Austria) Interior: Moodley Strategy & Design Group
- Family name: Fuxing
- Replaced: CRH2C, CRH3C, CRH380A, CRH380B
- Formation: BF, BF-C, BF-G, BF-Z, BF-GZ, BF-J, BF-S, BF-GS: 8 cars/trainset (4M4T); BF-A, BF-AZ, CRH-0306: 16 cars/trainset (8M8T); BF-B, BF-BZ, BF-BS: 17 cars/trainset (8M9T)
- Operator: China Railway Corporation

Specifications
- Train length: BF, BF–G: 209 m (685 ft 8 in); BF–0031: 210 m (689 ft 0 in); BF–C, BF–Z, BF–GZ, BF–J, BF–G–0051, BF–S, BF–GS: 211 m (692 ft 3 in); BF–A: 414 m (1,358 ft 3 in); BF-AZ: 416.2 m (1,365 ft 6 in); BF–B: 439.8 m (1,442 ft 11 in); BF–BZ, BF–BS: 442 m (1,450 ft 2 in)
- Width: 3,360 mm (11 ft 0 in)
- Height: 4,050 mm (13 ft 3 in)
- Platform height: 1,250 mm (4 ft 1.2 in)
- Maximum speed: Service: 350 km/h (220 mph); Design: 400 km/h (250 mph); Record: CR400BF: 420 km/h (260 mph); CR400BF-J: 450 km/h (280 mph)
- Axle load: <17 t (16.7 long tons; 18.7 short tons)
- Traction system: Water cooling IGBT-VVVF inverter control (Zhuzhou CRRC Times Electric)
- Traction motors: YJ-268A and YJ-305A external sector 3-phase AC induction motor (Zhuzhou CRRC Times Electric)
- Electric system: 25 kV 50 Hz AC Overhead catenary
- Current collection: Pantograph
- Track gauge: 1,435 mm (4 ft 8 1/2 in) standard gauge

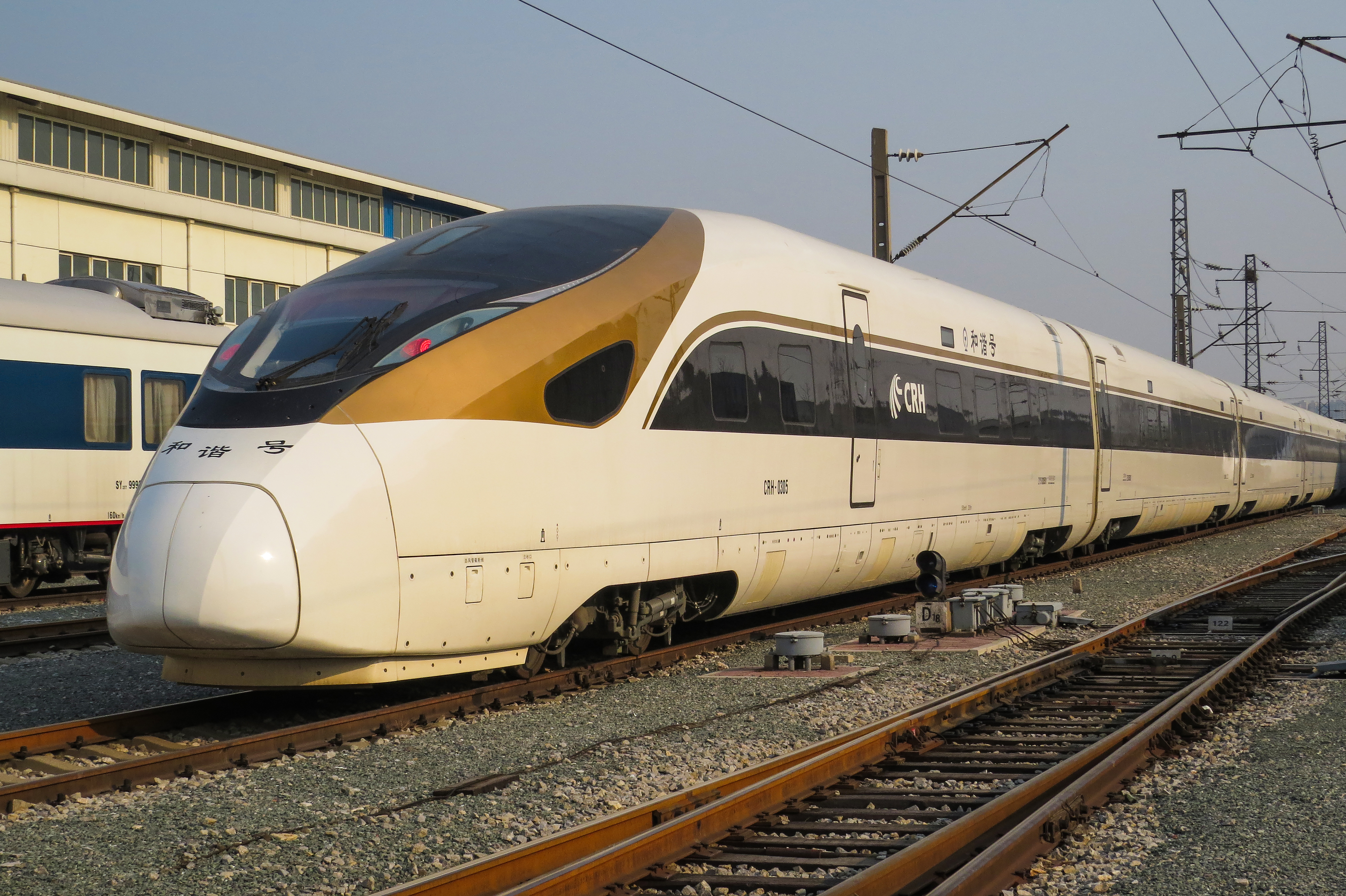
CR400BF prototype testing in the National Railway Test Center, Beijing

The CR400BF Fuxing (Chinese: 复兴号; pinyin: Fùxīng Hào) is a Chinese electric high-speed train that was developed and manufactured by CRRC Changchun Railway Vehicles. As part of the China Standardized EMU, The CR400BF is designed to operate at a cruise speed of 350 km/h (217 mph) and a maximum speed of 420 km/h (261 mph) in commercial service. Development on the project started in 2012, and the design plan was finished in September 2014. The first EMU rolled off the production line on 30 June 2015. The series received its current designation of Fuxing in June 2017, with the nickname Golden Phoenix. It is among the world's fastest conventional high-speed trains in regular service, with an operating speed of 350 km/h (217 mph).

== Variants ==
=== CR400BF ===
8-car standard production model with standard maximum speed of 420 km/h (261 mph). It is manufactured by CRRC Changchun Railway Vehicles.

=== CR400BF–A ===
16-car version manufactured by CRRC Changchun Railway Vehicles. Testing of this variant started on March 9, 2018. The first CR400BF-A started operation of the Beijing–Shanghai high-speed railway on June 29, 2018. These sets are 415 m (1,361 ft 7 in) and have a passenger capacity of 1,193 people.

=== CR400BF–B ===
17-car version. It is manufactured by CRRC Changchun Railway Vehicles.

=== CR400BF–C ===
8-car ATO enabled version with redesigned interior and exterior used on the Beijing–Zhangjiakou intercity railway in preparation for the 2022 Winter Olympics. It is manufactured by CRRC Changchun Railway Vehicles. The interior design incorporates snow and ice elements with blue ambient light. The train is also equipped with high-definition LED destination displays, wireless charging for business class seats, and smart glass windows. Additional features include snowboard storage and urine sampling areas. The trains are manufactured by CRRC Changchun Railway Vehicles. CR400BF–C started operating on December 30, 2019, with the opening of the Beijing–Zhangjiakou ICR.

=== CR400BF–G ===
8-car sandstorm and cold resistant version for use in more extreme weather. It is manufactured by CRRC Changchun Railway Vehicles. Shares same exterior style as the CR400BF.

=== CR400BF–Z ===
8-car variant with redesigned and upgraded interior and exterior. It is manufactured by CRRC Changchun Railway Vehicles.

=== CR400BF–AZ ===
16-car variant with upgrade new train in December 2023. Manufactured by CRRC Changchun Railway Vehicles.

=== CR400BF–BZ ===
17-car variant with redesigned and upgraded interior and exterior. It is manufactured by CRRC Changchun Railway Vehicles.

=== CR400BF–GZ ===
8-car sandstorm/cold resistant version with redesigned interior and exterior. It is manufactured by CRRC Changchun Railway Vehicles.

=== CR400BF–J ===
8-car HSR inspection train with redesigned exterior, similar to CR400BF-C and BF-Z series.

=== CR400BF–S ===
8-car variant with upgraded train system and can accommodate more passengers. It was introduced in May 2024 and manufactured by CRRC Changchun Railway Vehicles.

=== CR400BF–GS ===
8-car sandstorm/cold resistant version with upgraded train system and can accommodate more passengers with a capacity of 619 passengers. It was introduced in July 2024 and manufactured by CRRC Changchun Railway Vehicles.

=== CR400BF–AS ===
16-car variant with upgraded train system and can accommodate more passengers. It was introduced in May 2025 with upgraded train system and can accommodate more passengers.It has a capacity of 1254 passengers.

=== CR400BF–BS ===
Like the CR400AF-BS, an upgraded 17-car variant called the CR400BF-BS was introduced in April 2024 for use on the Beijing-Shanghai high speed railway from 15 June 2024. This variant features interior enhancements to accommodate more passengers and a new seating class called Premium First Class, which is intermediate between First Class and Business Class.

== Specification ==
Train type	Car dimensions	Total length	Top speed	Seating capacity	Formation	Power output (under 25 kV)	Entry into Service
CR400BF/BF–A/BF–B/BF–C/BF–S/BF–G
CR400BF	End cars length: 27.089 m (88 ft 10.5 in); Inter cars length: 25.65 m (84 ft 2 in); Width: 3.36 m (11 ft 0 in); Height: 4.05 m (13 ft 3 in)	Calculated: 209.1 m (686 ft 0 in); Real: 209 m (685 ft 8 in)	Test: 420 km/h (261 mph); Design: 400 km/h (249 mph); Continuous operation: 400 km/h (249 mph); Current operation: 350 km/h (217 mph)	556: 10 business, 28 first and 518 standard 576: 10 business, 28 first and 538 standard	4M4T	10.14 MW (13,598 hp)	August 15, 2016
CR400BF–C	End cars length: 27.089 m (88 ft 10.5 in); Inter cars length: 25.65 m (84 ft 2 in); Width: 3.36 m (11 ft 0 in); Height: 4.05 m (13 ft 3 in)	Calculated: 209.1 m (686 ft 0 in); Real: 209 m (685 ft 8 in)	Test: 420 km/h (261 mph); Design: 400 km/h (249 mph); Continuous operation: 400 km/h (249 mph); Current operation: 350 km/h (217 mph)	576: 10 business, 28 first and 538 standard 541: 10 business, 28 first and 503 standard	4M4T	10.14 MW (13,598 hp)	December 30, 2019
CR400BF–G	End cars length: 27.089 m (88 ft 10.5 in); Inter cars length: 25.65 m (84 ft 2 in); Width: 3.36 m (11 ft 0 in); Height: 4.05 m (13 ft 3 in)	Calculated: 209.1 m (686 ft 0 in); Real: 209 m (685 ft 8 in)	Test: 420 km/h (261 mph); Design: 400 km/h (249 mph); Continuous operation: 400 km/h (249 mph); Current operation: 350 km/h (217 mph)	576: 10 business, 28 first and 538 standard	4M4T	10.14 MW (13,598 hp)	June 9, 2019
CR400BF–A	End cars length: 27.089 m (88 ft 10.5 in); Inter cars length: 25.65 m (84 ft 2 in); Width: 3.36 m (11 ft 0 in); Height: 4.05 m (13 ft 3 in)	Calculated: 414.26 m (1,359 ft 1 in); Real: 414 m (1,358 ft 3 in)	Test: 420 km/h (261 mph); Design: 400 km/h (249 mph); Continuous operation: 400 km/h (249 mph); Current operation: 350 km/h (217 mph)	1193: 22 business, 148 first and 1023 standard	8M8T	20.28 MW (27,196 hp)	June 12, 2018
CR400BF–S	End cars length: 27.089 m (88 ft 10.5 in); Inter cars length: 25.65 m (84 ft 2 in); Width: 3.36 m (11 ft 0 in); Height: 4.05 m (13 ft 3 in)	Calculated: 414.26 m (1,359 ft 1 in); Real: 414 m (1,358 ft 3 in)	Test: 420 km/h (261 mph); Design: 400 km/h (249 mph); Continuous operation: 400 km/h (249 mph); Current operation: 350 km/h (217 mph)	UNKNOWN	8M8T	20.28 MW (27,196 hp)	Under testing
CR400BF–B	End cars length: 27.089 m (88 ft 10.5 in); Inter cars length: 25.65 m (84 ft 2 in); Width: 3.36 m (11 ft 0 in); Height: 4.05 m (13 ft 3 in)	Calculated: 438.928 m (1,440 ft 0.6 in); Real: 439.8 m (1,442 ft 11 in)	Test: 420 km/h (261 mph); Design: 400 km/h (249 mph); Continuous operation: 400 km/h (249 mph); Current operation: 350 km/h (217 mph)	1283: 22 business, 148 first and 1113 standard	8M9T	20.28 MW (27,196 hp)	January 5, 2019

== Formation ==
Power Destination

- M – Motor car
- T – Trailer car
- C – Driver cabin
- P – Pantograph

Coach Type

- ZY – First Class Coach
- ZE – Second Class Coach
- ZEC – Second Class Coach/Dining Car
- ZYS – First Class/Business Coach
- ZES – Second Class/Business Coach
- WR – Soft Sleeper Car
- WRC – Soft Sleeper/Dining Car
- DGN – Multi-function Coach

=== CR400BF, CR400BF–C, CR400BF–Z, CR400BF–G, CR400BF–GZ, CR400BF–GS, CR400BF–S ===
Coach No.	1	2	3	4	5	6	7	8
Type^{1}^{4}^{5}^{6}	ZYS	ZE			ZEC	ZE		ZES
Type^{2}^{3}	ZYS	ZE			DGN	ZE		ZES
Power Configuration	Mc	Tp	M		T	M	Tp	Mc
Power Units	Unit 1				Unit 2			
Capacity^{1}	5+28	90		75	63	90		5+40
Capacity^{2}	5+28	90		75	48	90		5+40
Capacity^{3}	6+28	90		75	48	90		6+40
Capacity^{4}	6+28	90		75	63	90		6+40
Capacity^{5}	5+28	90		75	63	90		6+40
Capacity^{6}	5+32	93		78	83	93		6+43

- ^1 Remaining series
- ^2 CR400BF–C–5145 trainset
- ^3 CR400BF–C–5162 trainset
- ^4 Remaining CR400BF–Z and CR400BF–GZ series
- ^5 CR400BF–Z–3146–3156, CR400BF–GZ–5256–5262, CR400BF–Z–5263–5275 series
- ^6 CR400BF–GS and CR400BF–S series

=== CR400BF–A, CR400BF–AZ, CR400BF–AS ===
Coach No.	1	2	3	4	5	6	7	8	9	10	11	12	13	14	15	16
Type^{1}^{2}^{3}^{4}	SW	ZY	ZE						ZEC	ZE					ZY	ZYS
Power Configuration	Tc	M	Tp	M		Tp	M	T		M	Tp	M		Tp	M	Tc
Power Units	Unit 1				Unit 2				Unit 3				Unit 4			
Capacity^{1}	5+12	60	90					75	48	90					60	5+28
Capacity^{2}	6+12	60	90					75	48	90					60	6+28
Capacity^{3}	6+14	62	93					78	73	93					62	5+24
Capacity^{4}	5+14	62	93					78	73	93					62	5+32

- ^1 CR400BF–A series
- ^2 CR400BF–AZ series
- ^3 CR400BF–AS series, with preferred first-class seating
- ^4 CR400BF–AS series, without preferred first-class seating

=== CR400BF–B, CR400BF–BZ, CR400BF–BS ===
Coach No.	1	2	3	4	5	6	7	8	9	10	11	12	13	14	15	16	17
Type^{1}^{2}^{3}	SW	ZY	ZE						ZEC	ZE						ZY	ZYS
Power Configuration	Tc	M	Tp	M		Tp	M	T		M	Tp	M		Tp	M	T	Tc
Power Units	Unit 1				Unit 2				Unit 3				Unit 4				
Capacity^{1}	5+12	60	90					75	48	90						60	5+28
Capacity^{2}	6+12	60	90					75	48	90						60	6+28
Capacity^{3}	6+14	62	93					78	73	93						62	5+24

- ^1 CR400BF–B series
- ^2 CR400BF–BZ series
- ^3 CR400BF–BS series

== Distribution ==
As of August 2026, there are 742 CR400BF series EMU in service.

Train model letter identification

- G – Cold-resistant
- C, Z – Intelligent
- S – Enhanced-technology
- E – Sleeper
- A – 16-car trainset
- B – 17-car trainset

Vehicle number distinction

- 0X0X, 00XX – Sample vehicles, test vehicles
- 03XX, 05XX – Vehicles or sample vehicles purchased by non-national railway groups
- 3XXX: Trains produced from CRRC Tangshan Locomotive and Rolling Stock
- 5XXX: Trains produced from CRRC Changchun Railway Vehicles

Operator	Quantity	Serial number	Depot	Notes
CR400BF
CR Beijing	30	0503, 5006, 5022, 5025-5028, 5030-5037, 5040～5042, 5070, 5072, 5074, 5076, 5077, 5106～5112	Caozhuang	0503 is the prototype trainset 0031 was the 400kph high-speed test trainset
CR Beijing	8	0031, 3067, 3068, 3085-3087, 3090, 3091	Dachang	
CR Shanghai	47	3001-3004, 3007, 3008, 3010, 3012-3016, 3018, 3020-3022, 3035, 3036, 3039, 3041, 3042, 3048, 3049, 3062, 3063, 3065, 3070-3072, 3078-3081, 3083, 3084, 3088, 3089, 5007, 5009, 5017, 5018, 5023, 5043, 5046, 5068, 5075, 5080	Nanjing South	
CR Shanghai	22	3077, 3082, 3106, 3107, 5001-5004, 5008, 5010-5013, 5016, 5019, 5024, 5044, 5045, 5073, 5078, 5079, 5081	Hefei South	3106 and 3107 equipped with cab side door
CR Shanghai	26	3005, 3006, 3009, 3011, 3017, 3019, 3023, 3034, 3037, 3038, 3040, 3043-3047, 3059-3061, 3064, 3066, 3069, 3073-3076	Xuzhou East	
CR Guangzhou	10	0507, 5005, 5014, 5015, 5020, 5021, 5038, 5039, 5047, 5069	Guangzhou South	0507 is the prototype trainset
CR Shenyang	1	0305	Shenyang North	Model car
CR400BF–A
CR Beijing	5	3030, 3050, 3054, 3056, 3092	Beijing South	
CR Beijing	9	3024, 3028, 3029, 3031, 3033, 5082–5084, 5087	Caozhuang	
CR Beijing	6	3025, 3032, 3051–3053, 3055	Xiong'an	
CR Shanghai	24	5048, 5049, 5053, 5054, 5057-5059, 5061, 5065, 5066, 5085, 5086, 5090-5092, 5094-5096, 5156-5161	Shanghai Hongqiao	
CR Shanghai	12	3026, 3058, 3096-3105	Shanghai Nanxiang	
CR Shanghai	18	3027, 3057, 3093～3095, 5050～5052, 5055, 5056, 5060, 5062-5064, 5067, 5088, 5089, 5093	Nanjing South	
CR400BF–B
CR Shanghai	14	5097–5105, 5151–5155	Shanghai Hongqiao	
CR400BF–G
CR Beijing	6	3109-3113、3115	Beijing Chaoyang	All trainsets equipped with cab side door
CR Beijing	31	0051, 5114, 5146-5150, 5163-5174, 5186, 5187, 5189-5198	Beijing North	0051 was the 400kph high-speed train testset All trainsets numbered 5163 afterwards equipped with cab side door
CR Beijing	2	5126, 5188	Caozhuang	Trainset 5188 equipped with cab side door
CR Beijing	4	3108, 3114, 3116, 5185	Dachang	All equipped with cab side door
CR Shenyang	17	5117, 5129, 5130, 5175-5184, 5199-5202	Shenyang North	Trainsets numbered 5175 afterwards equipped with cab side door
CR Shenyang	4	5119-5122	Shenyang South	
CR Hohhot	21	5113, 5115, 5116, 5118, 5123-5125, 5127, 5128, 5131-5142	Hohhot East	
CR400BF–C
CR Beijing	3	5144, 5145, 5162	Beijing North	5162 painted specifically for 2022 Winter Olympics and equipped with cab side door. Car 5 of 5145 and 5162 is a multi-purpose car.
CR400BF–Z
CR Beijing	22	0311, 0312, 3138-3145, 5210-5213, 5220-5227	Beijing South	
CR Shanghai	4	0521–0524	Hangzhou West	0524 painted specifically for 2022 Asian Games
CR Zhengzhou	17	0511-0514, 5229, 5230, 5233, 5234, 5236, 5239-5241, 5247-5251	Zhengzhou East	
CR Guangzhou	14	3117-3124, 5229, 5231, 5232, 5235, 5237, 5238	Guangzhou South	
CR Lanzhou	5	5242–5246	Lanzhou West	
CR Xi'an	37	3125-3137, 3146-3156, 5263-5275	Xi'an North	
CR400BF–AZ
CR Zhengzhou	10	0515–0520, 5252–5255	Zhengzhou East	
CR400BF–BZ
CR Shanghai	2	5208, 5209	Shanghai Hongqiao	
CR400BF–GZ
CR Harbin	19	5143, 5203-5207, 5214–5219, 5256–5262	Harbin West	5143 was originally a BF-C trainset
CR400BF–S
CR Beijing	8	3189, 3190, 3193, 3194, 3196, 3197, 3206, 3212	Beijing South	
CR Beijing	2	3192, 3213	Beijing Chaoyang	
CR Beijing	20	3191, 3195, 3207-3209, 3215, 3218～3223, 5291-5296, 5373, 5374	Tianjin Caozhuang	
CR Shanghai	52	3157-3171, 3173-3183, 3185-3188, 3198-3205, 3210, 3211, 3214, 3216, 3217, 3233-3238, 3273-3275	Shanghai Hongqiao	
CR Shanghai	12	3172, 3184, 5297-5306	Hangzhou West	
CR Guangzhou	36	3229-3232, 3239-3242, 3251-3253, 5281-5287, 5320-5323, 5328-5332, 5376-5384	Guangzhou South	
CR Zhengzhou	18	5288-5290, 5324-5327, 5333-5336, 5369-5372, 5375, 5385, 5386	Zhengzhou East	
CR Wuhan	21	3243-3250, 3254-3266	Wuhan	
CR400BF–AS
CR Shanghai	9	3224-3228, 3271, 3272, 5364, 5365	Shanghai Hongqiao	
CR Shanghai	10	3267-3270, 5417-5422	Nanjing South	
CR Shanghai	4	5366-5368、5423	Hangzhou West	
CR Guangzhou	8	3276-3281, 5441, 5442	Guangzhou South	All trainsets are 1261-pax trainsets, without preferred first class seats
CR400BF–BS
CR Shanghai	7	5276–5280, 5347, 5348	Shanghai Hongqiao	
CR400BF–GS
CR Beijing	26	5307-5314, 5317-5319, 5337-5340, 5349-5351, 5358-5360, 5399-5400, 5405-5407	Beijing Chaoyang	5339, 5340 temporarily transferred to CR Harbin
CR Shenyang	49	5315, 5316, 5341-5346, 5352-5354, 5361-5363, 5387-5397, 5401-5403, 5408-5416, 5429-5440	Shenyang North 3 sets Shenyang South 9 sets Changchun 28 sets and Dalian 9 sets	5345, 5346 temporarily transferred to CR Harbin
CR Harbin	10	5355-5357, 5398, 5404, 5424-5428	Harbin West	
CR400BF-J (CR450 Project)
China Railway of Academy Sciences	1	0001	—N/a	Original trainset was 0511 and use a CR400BF-C headtype
CR400BF-J (Inspection Train)
China Railway	1	0003	—N/a	Use a CR400BF-C headtype and equipped with cab side door
CRH-0306
—N/a	1	0306	—N/a	Sleeper EMU test trainset, using CR400BF head type
CR400BF-S
—N/a	1	0001	—N/a	Double-decker EMU test train
Longitudinal sleeper EMU
—N/a	1	—N/a	—N/a	Longitudinal sleeper EMU test trainset using CR400BF-C head

== Gallery ==
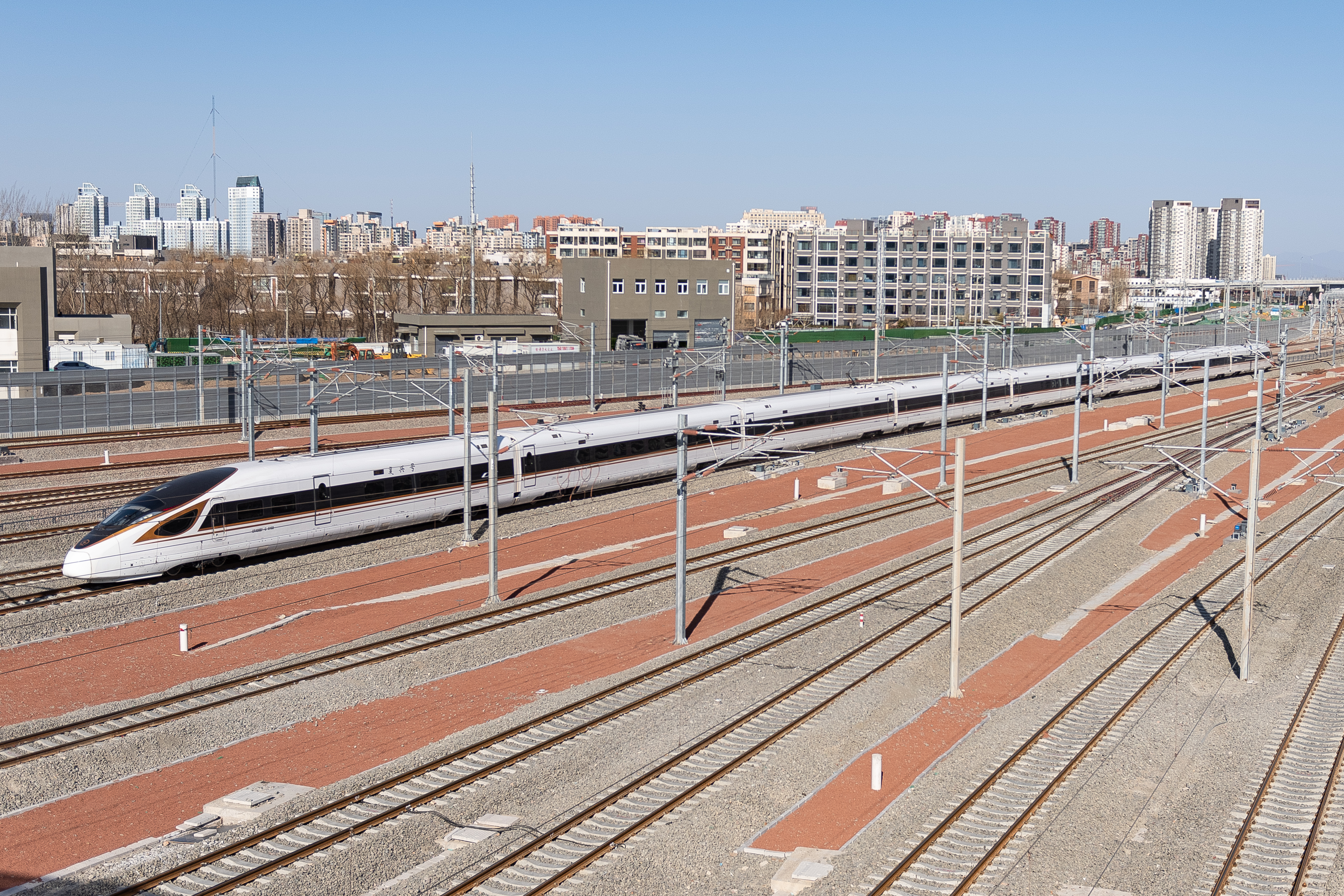
CR400BF-G at Beijing Chaoyang railway station

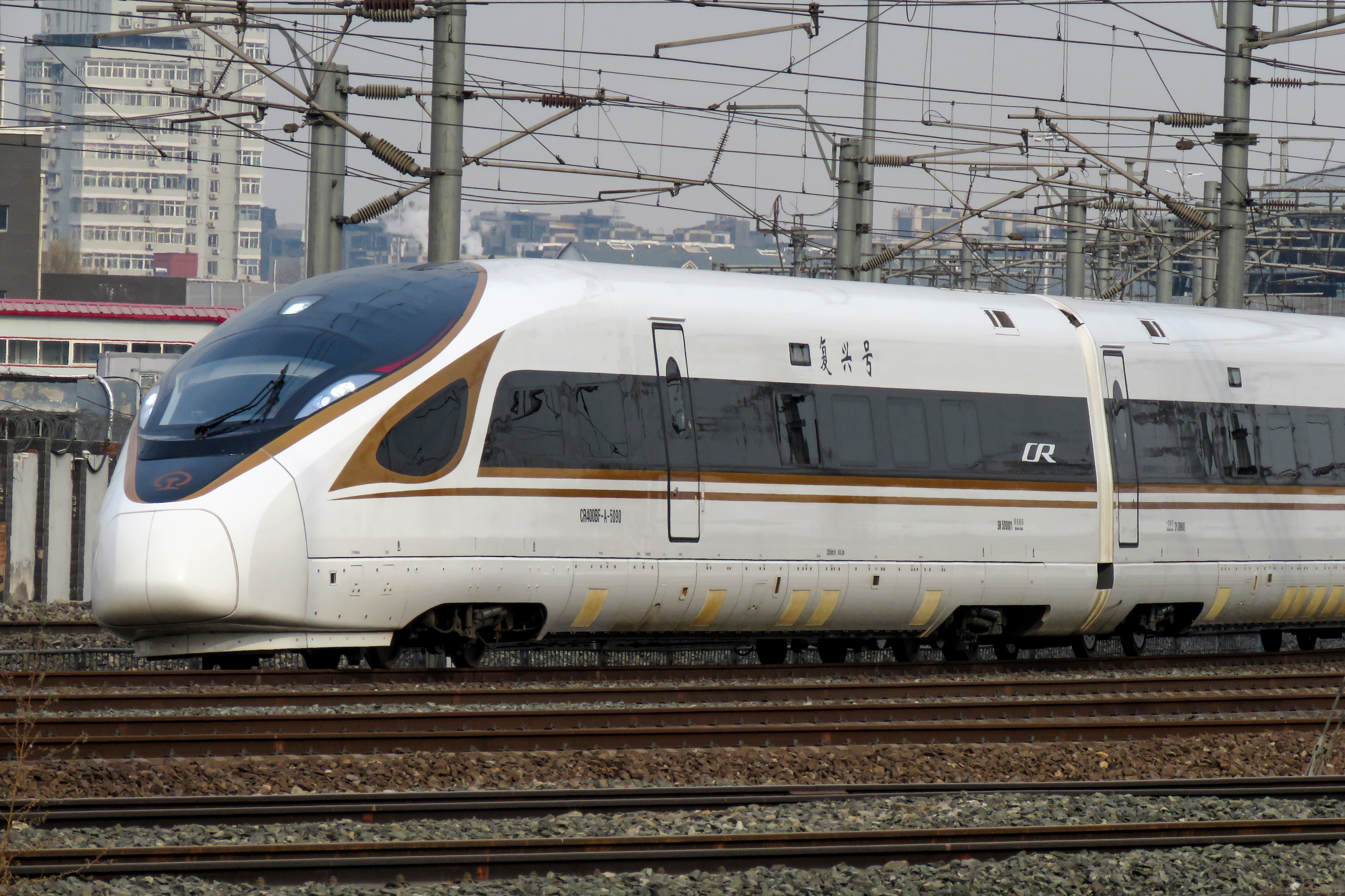
CR400BF-A to Shanghai Hongqiao railway station

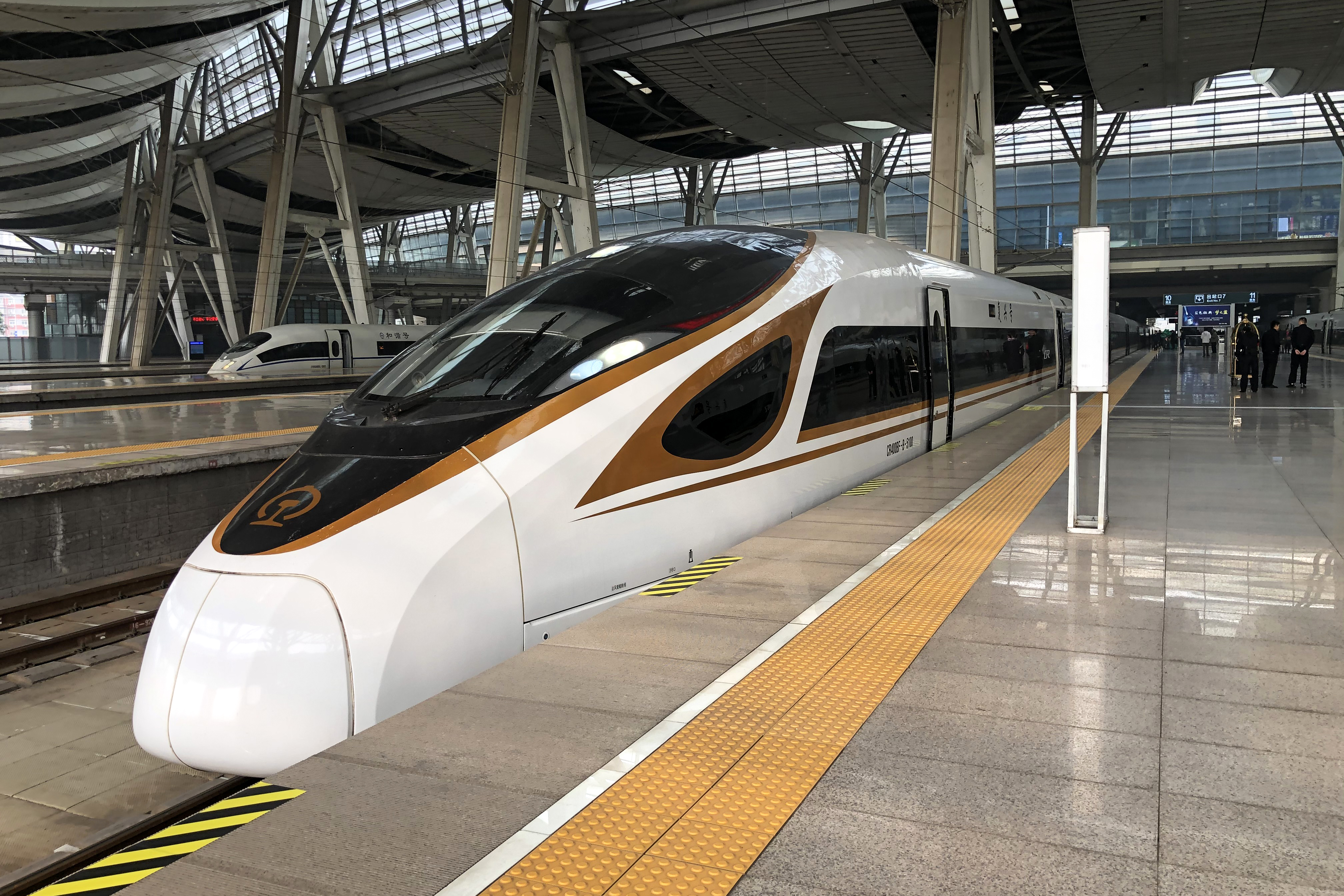
CR400BF-B departing Beijing South railway station to Shanghai Hongqiao railway station

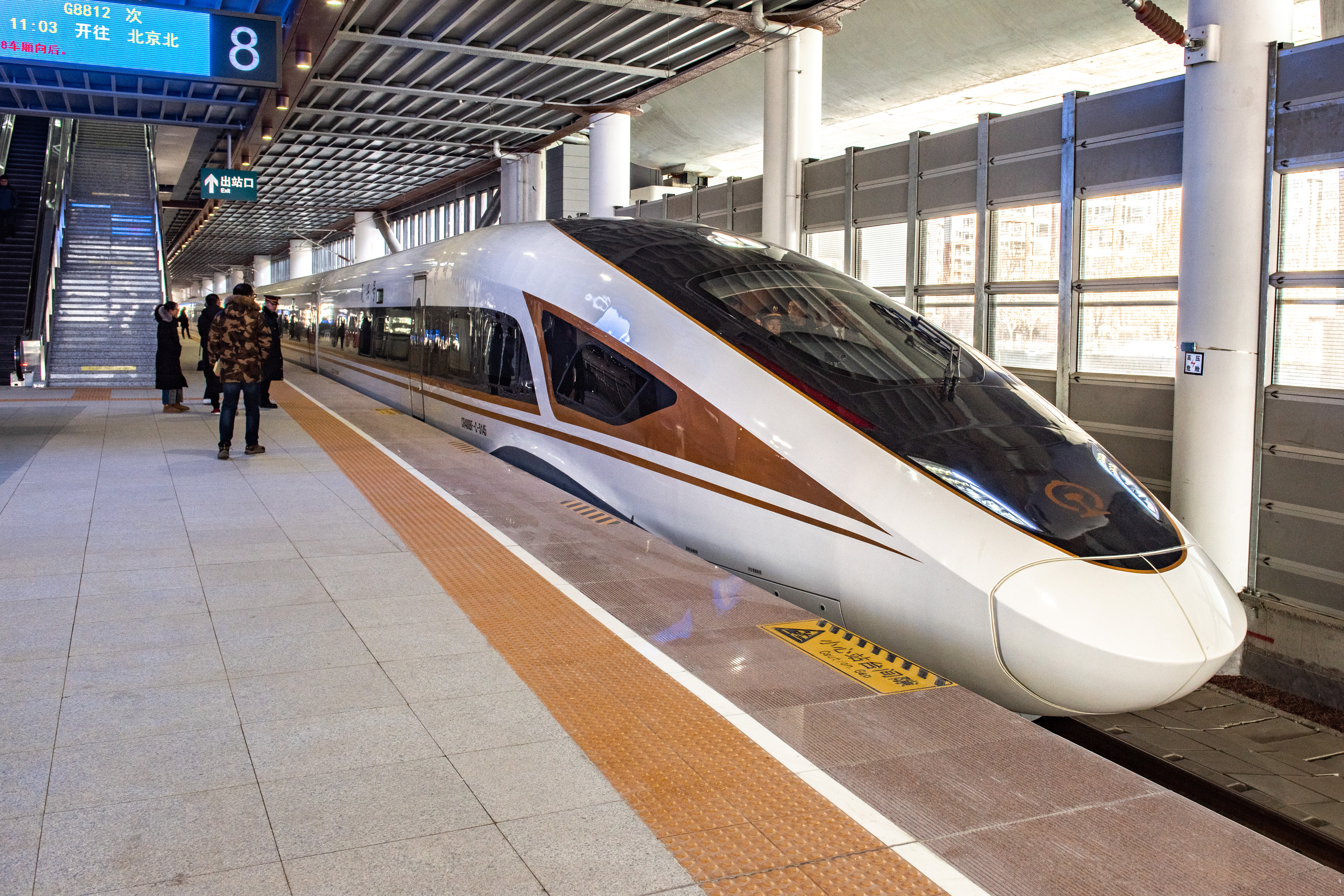
CR400BF-C at Qinghe railway station

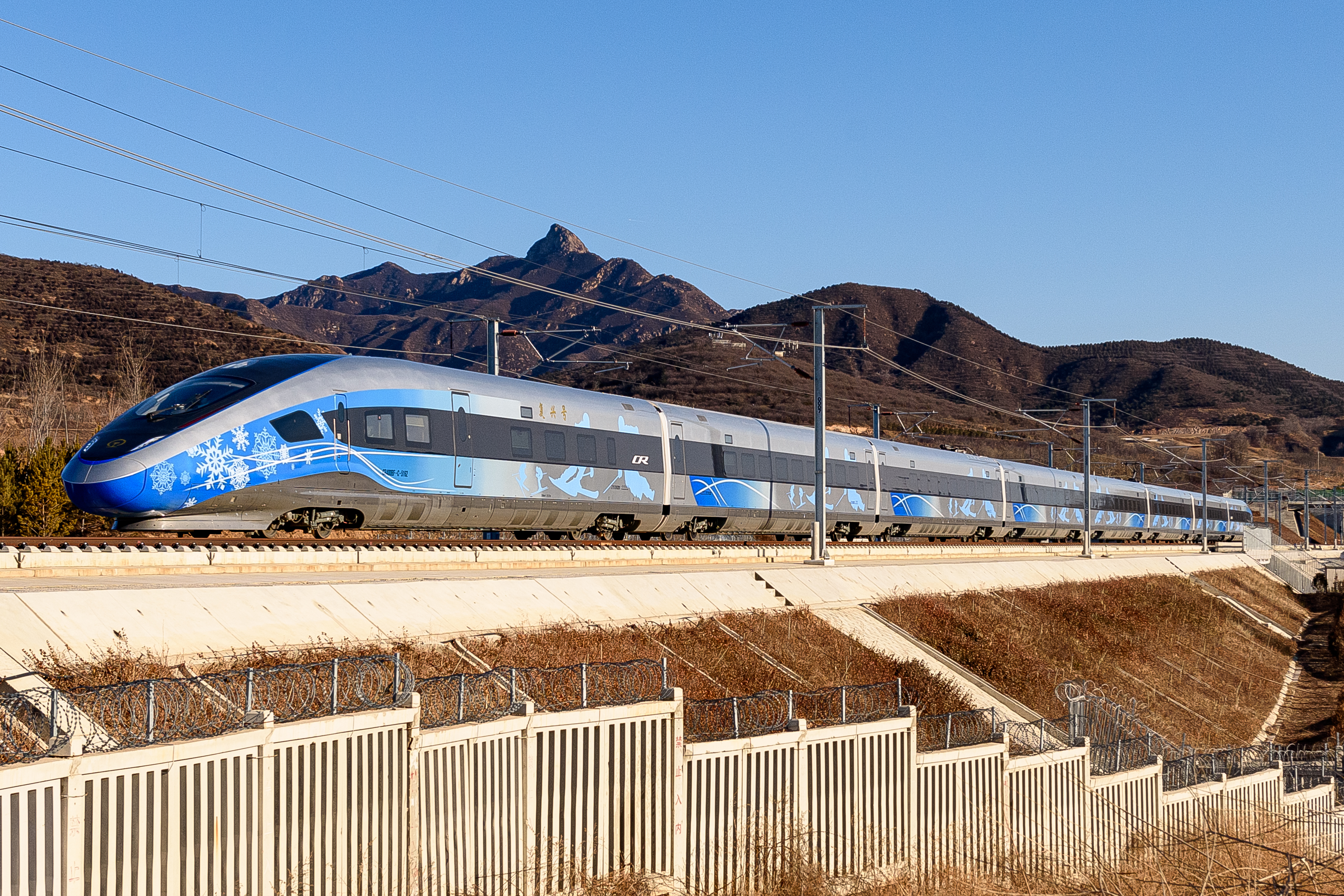
CR400BF-C with a special 2022 Winter Olympics livery

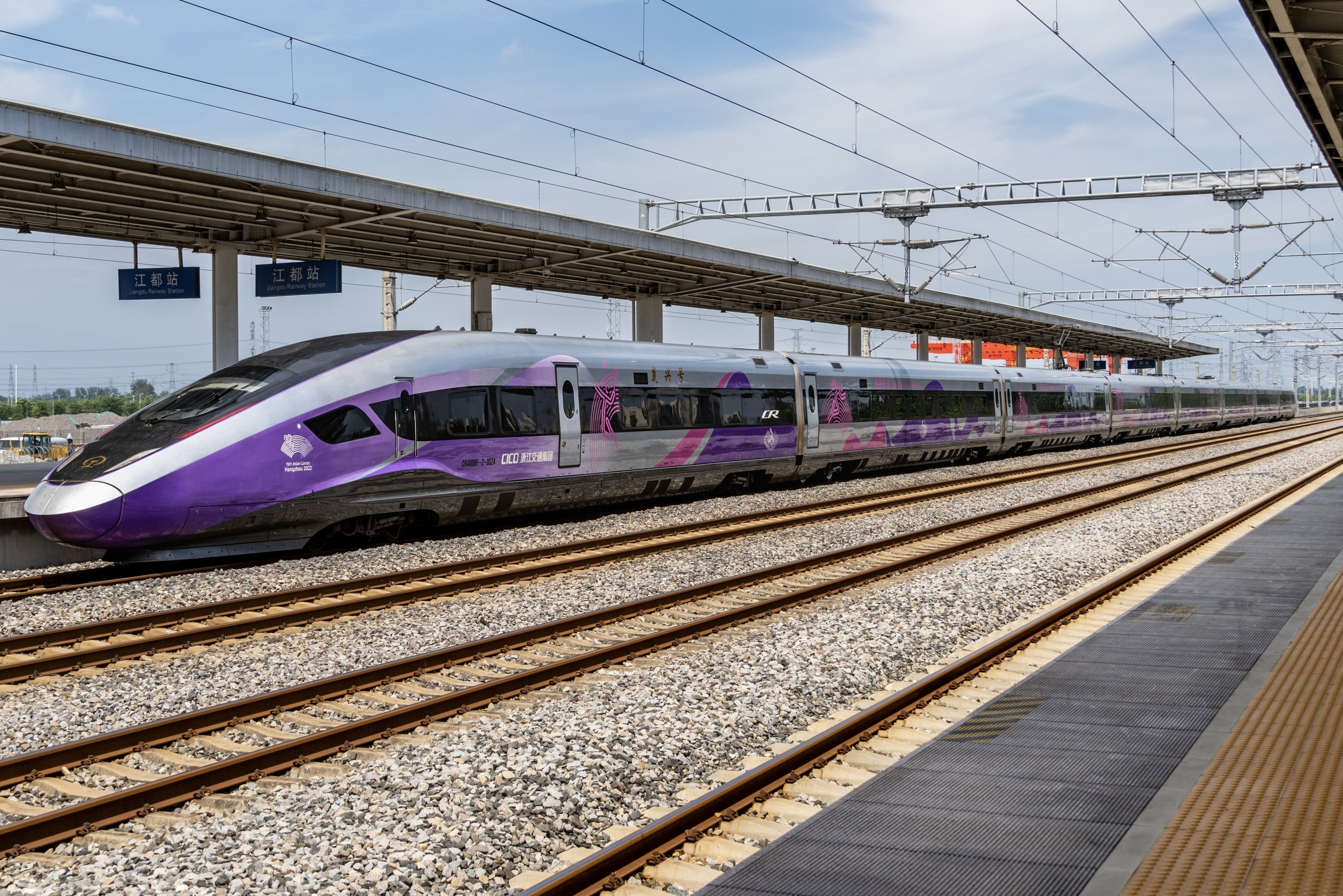
CR400BF-Z with livery of 2022 Asian Games

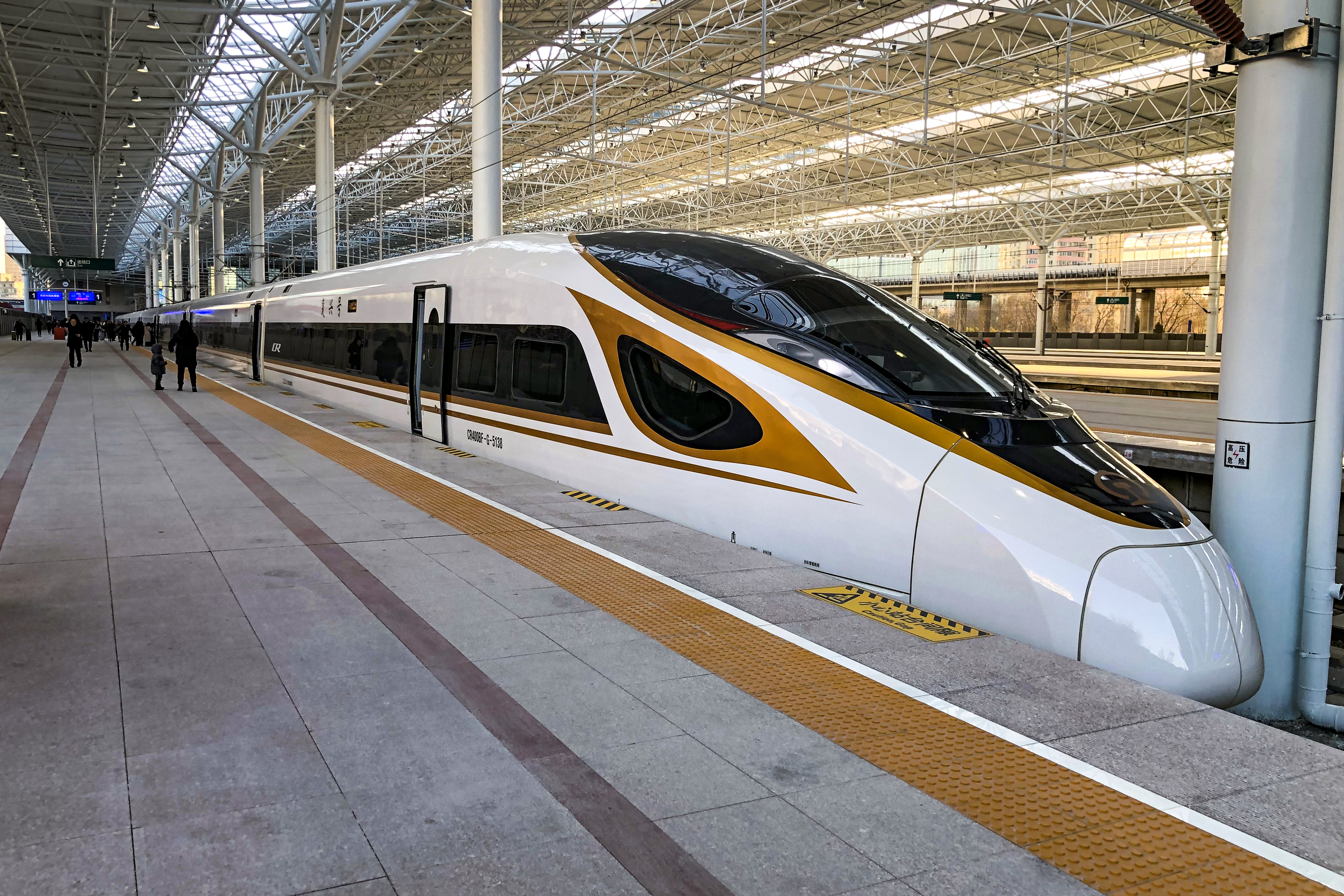
CR400BF-G at Beijing North railway station

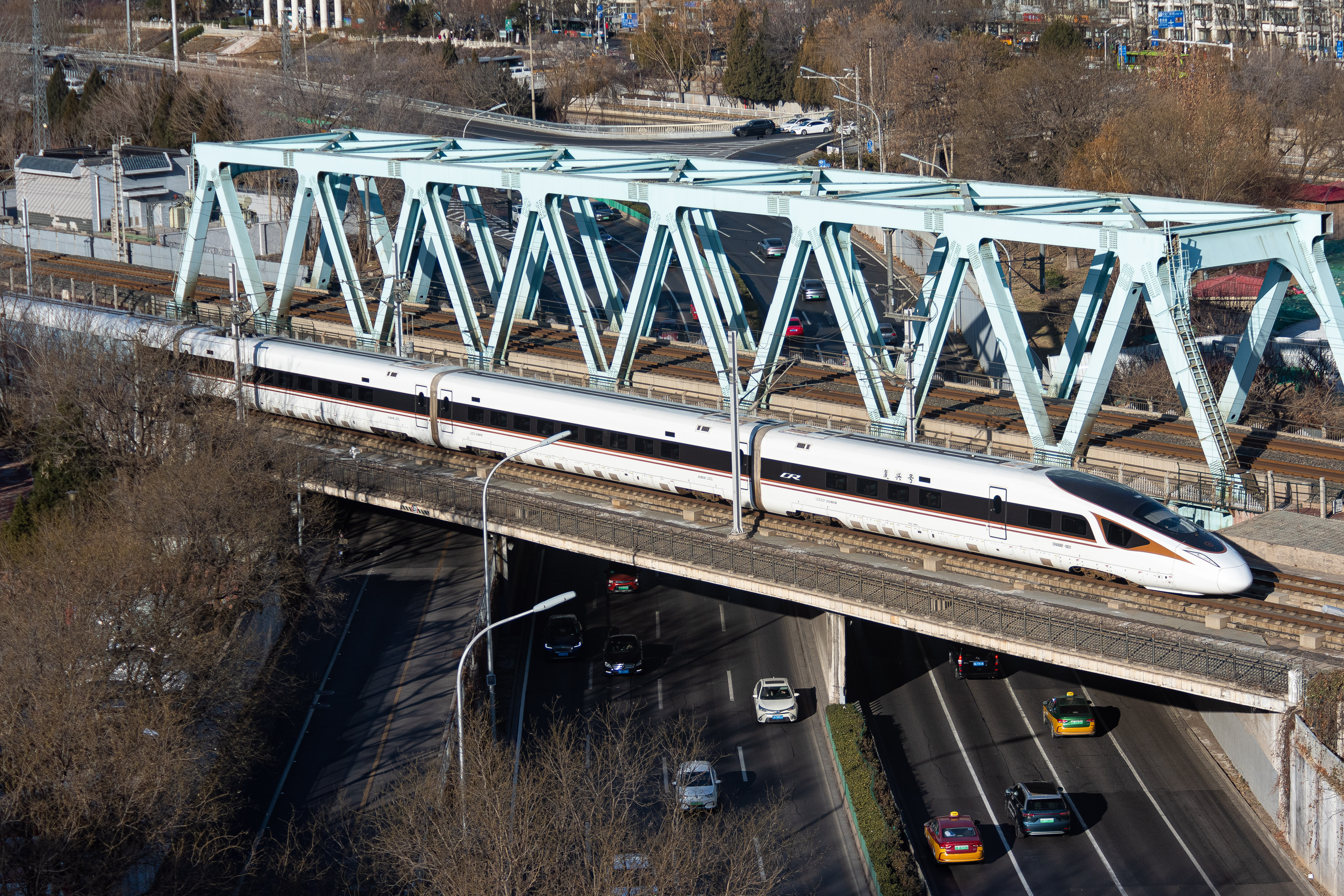
CR400BF-0031 (CRRC Variable Gauge EMU Prototype)

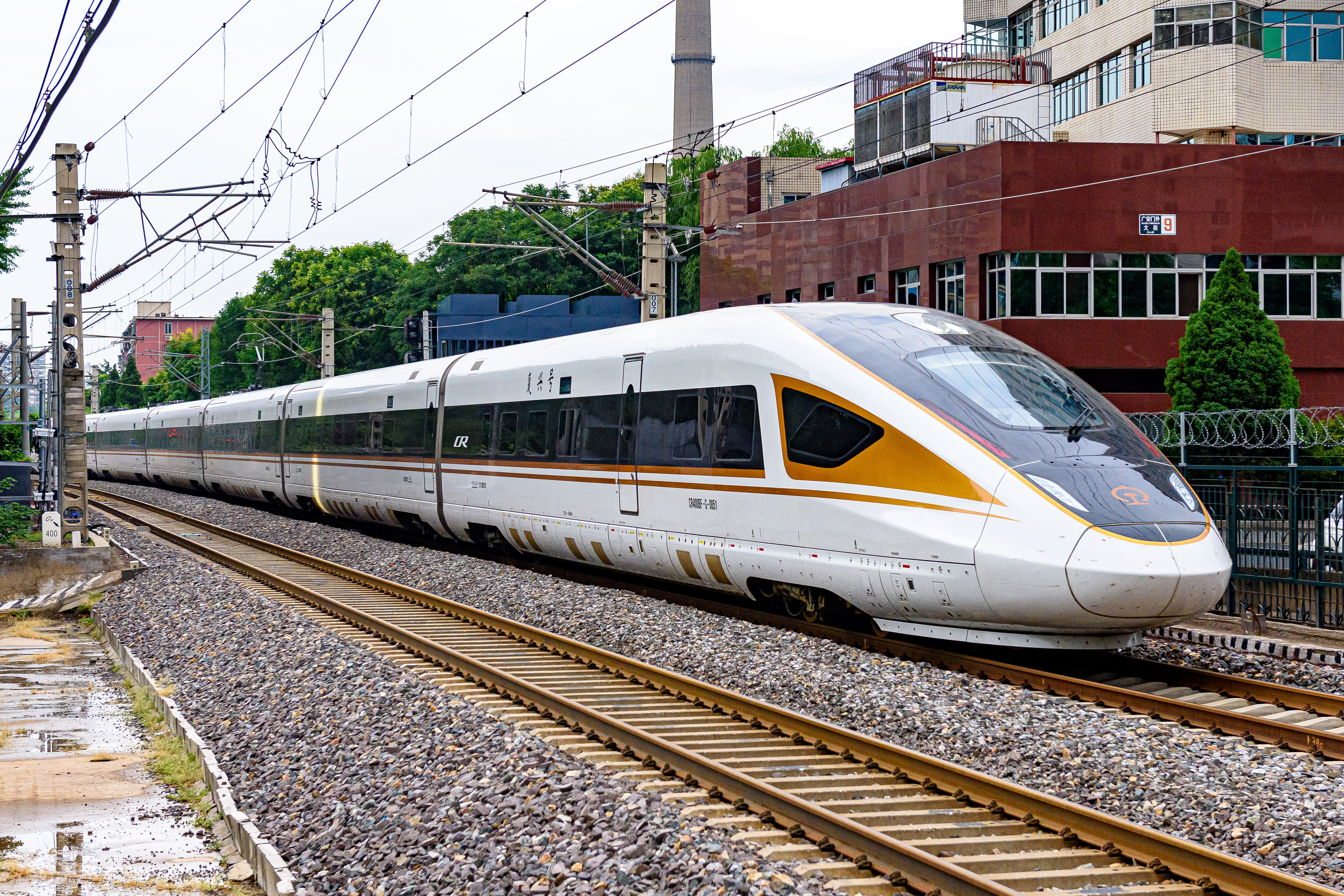
CR400BF-G-0051 (CRRC Variable Gauge EMU Prototype)

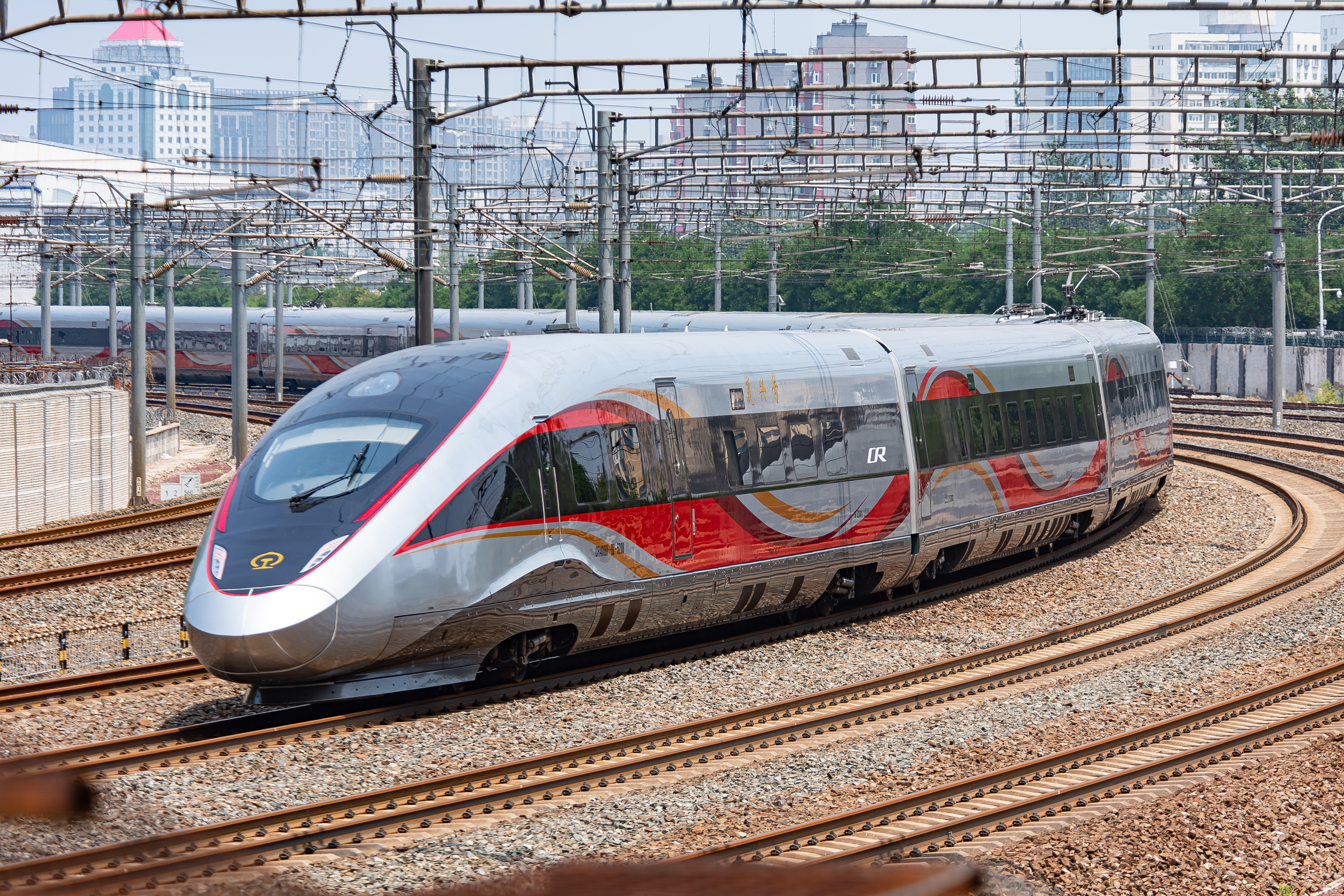
CR400BF-BZ at Beijing South railway station

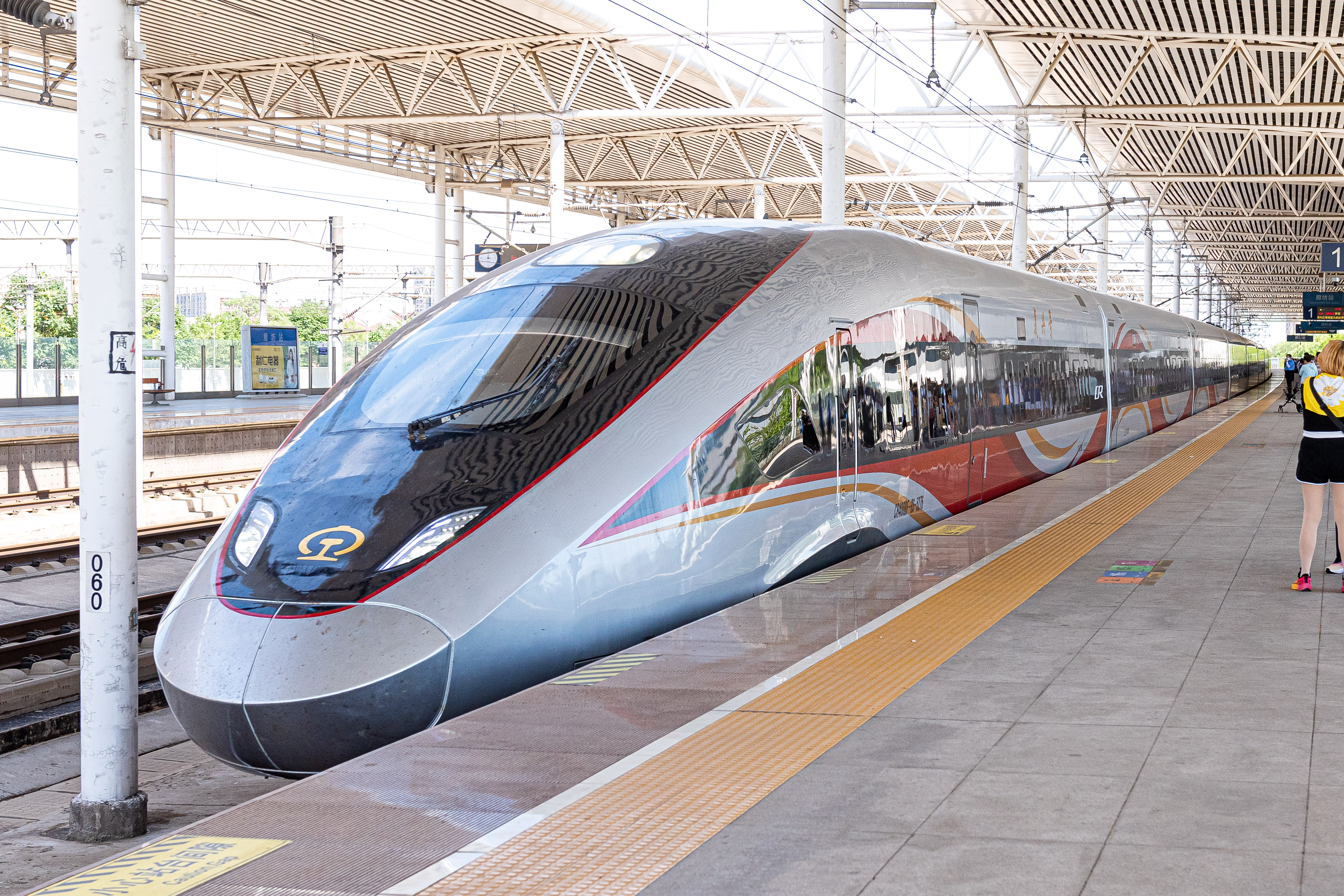
CR400BF-BS at Langfang railway station

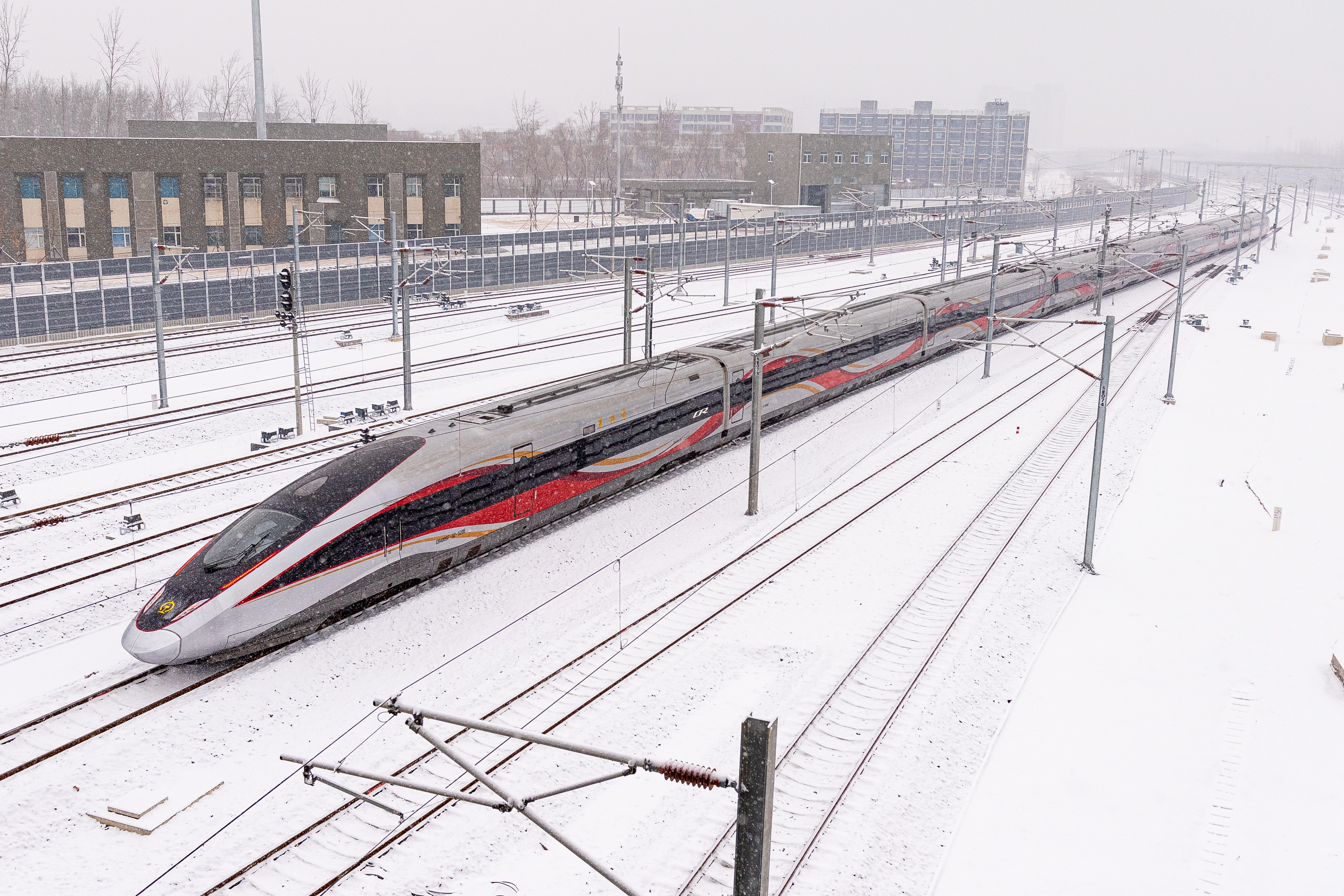
CR400BF-GZ leaving Beijing Chaoyang railway station

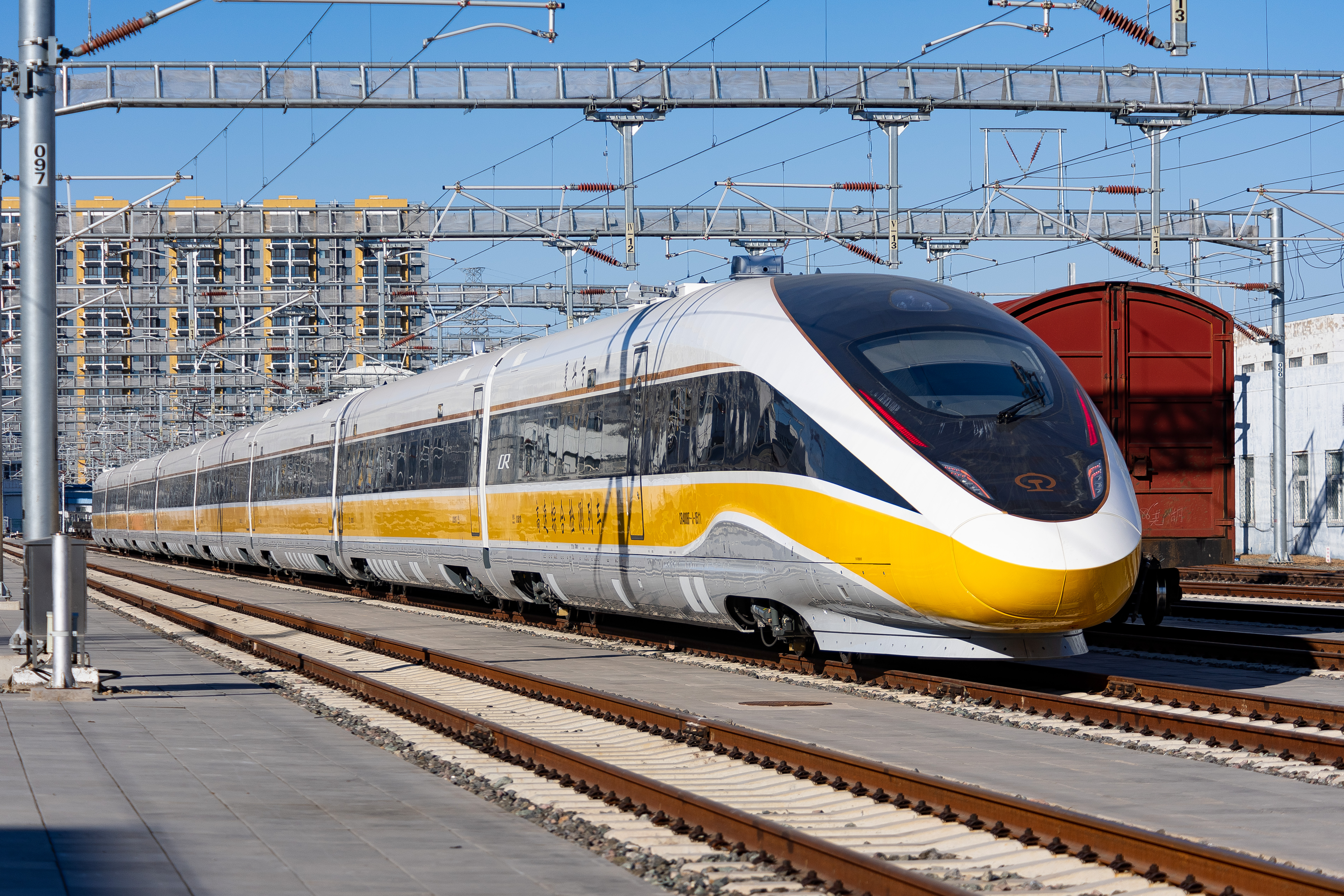
CR400BF-J inspection train

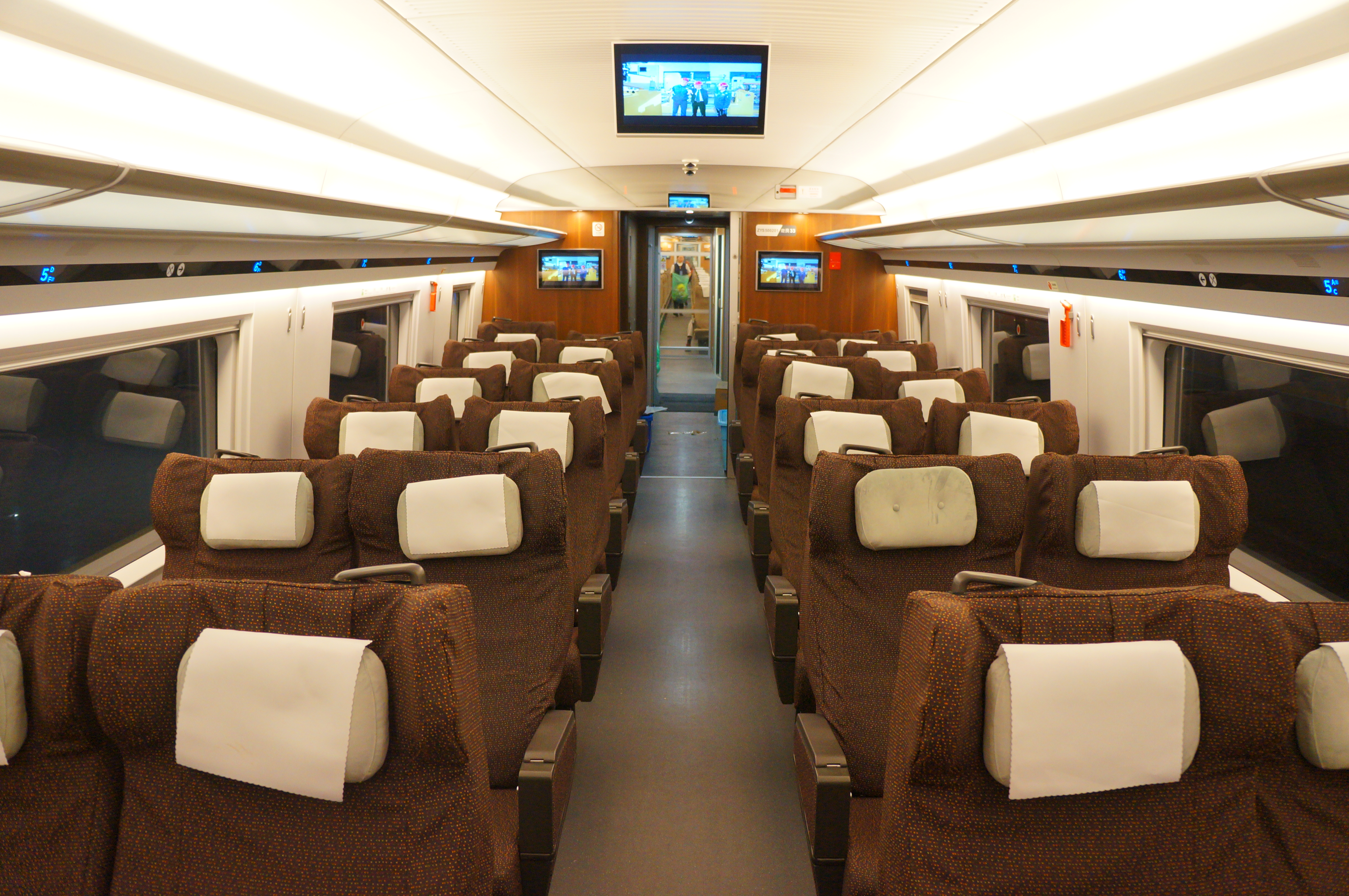
First Class on CR400BF

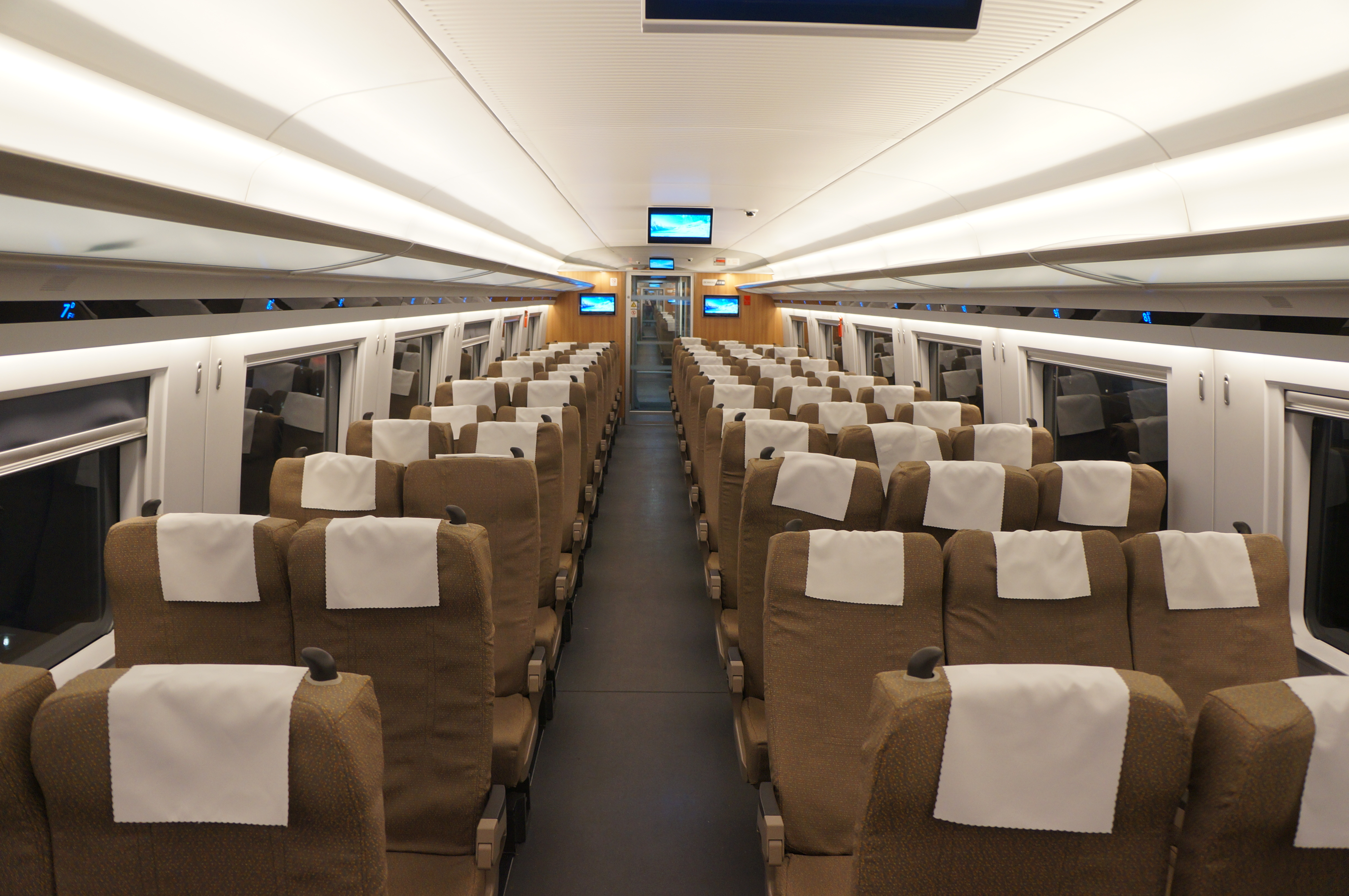
Second Class on CR400BF

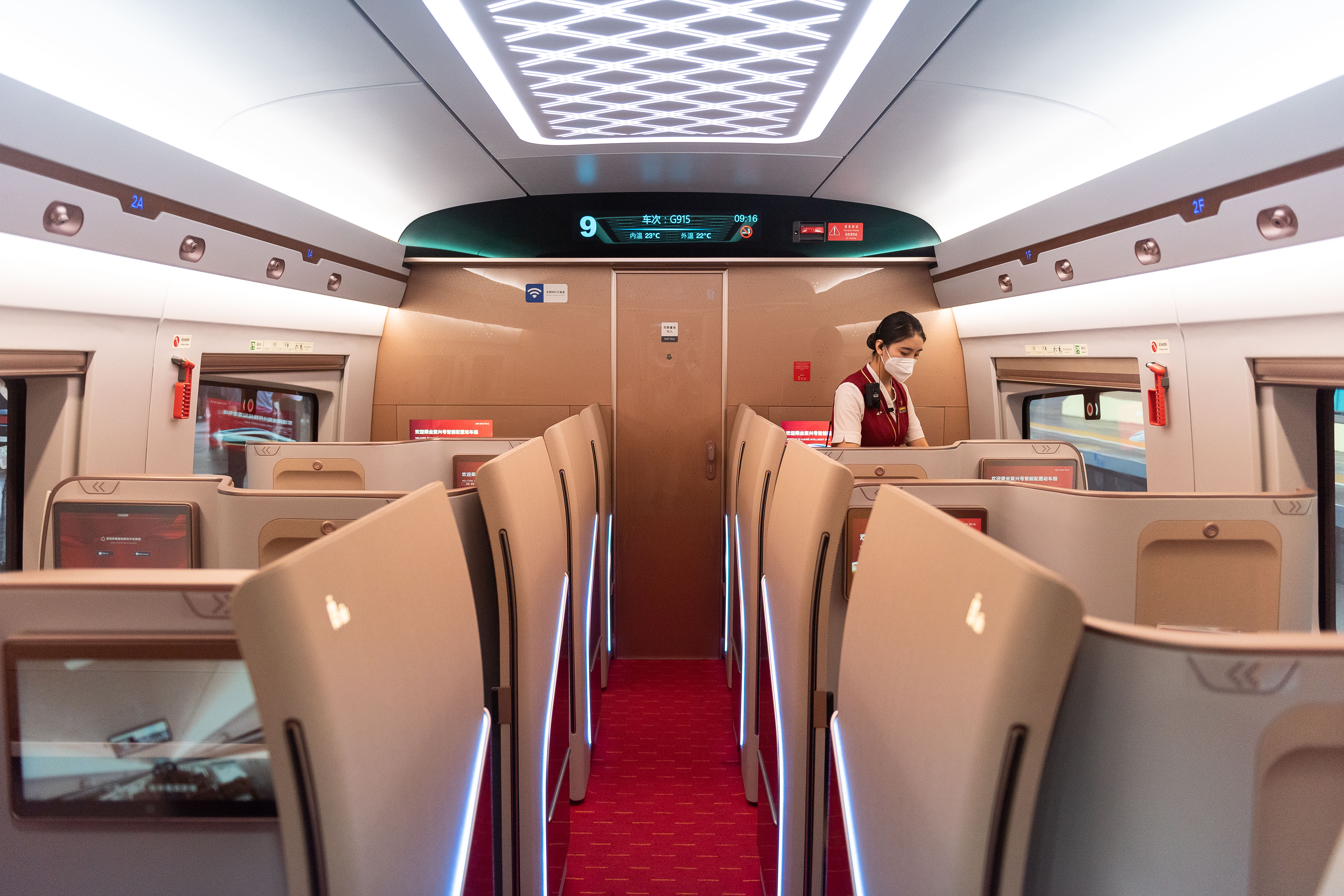
Business Class on CR400BF-GZ features staggered configuration

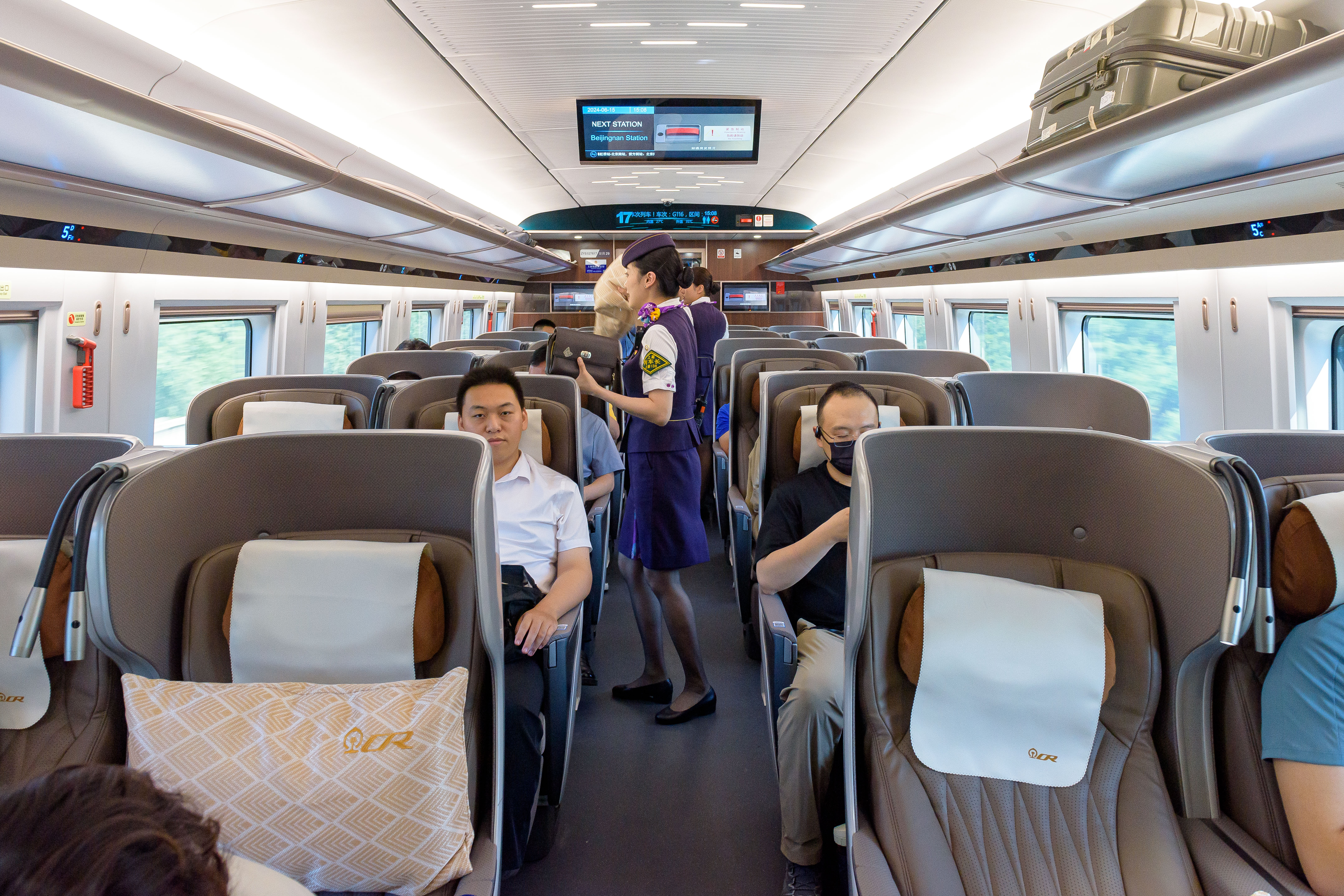
Premium first class on CR400BF-BS

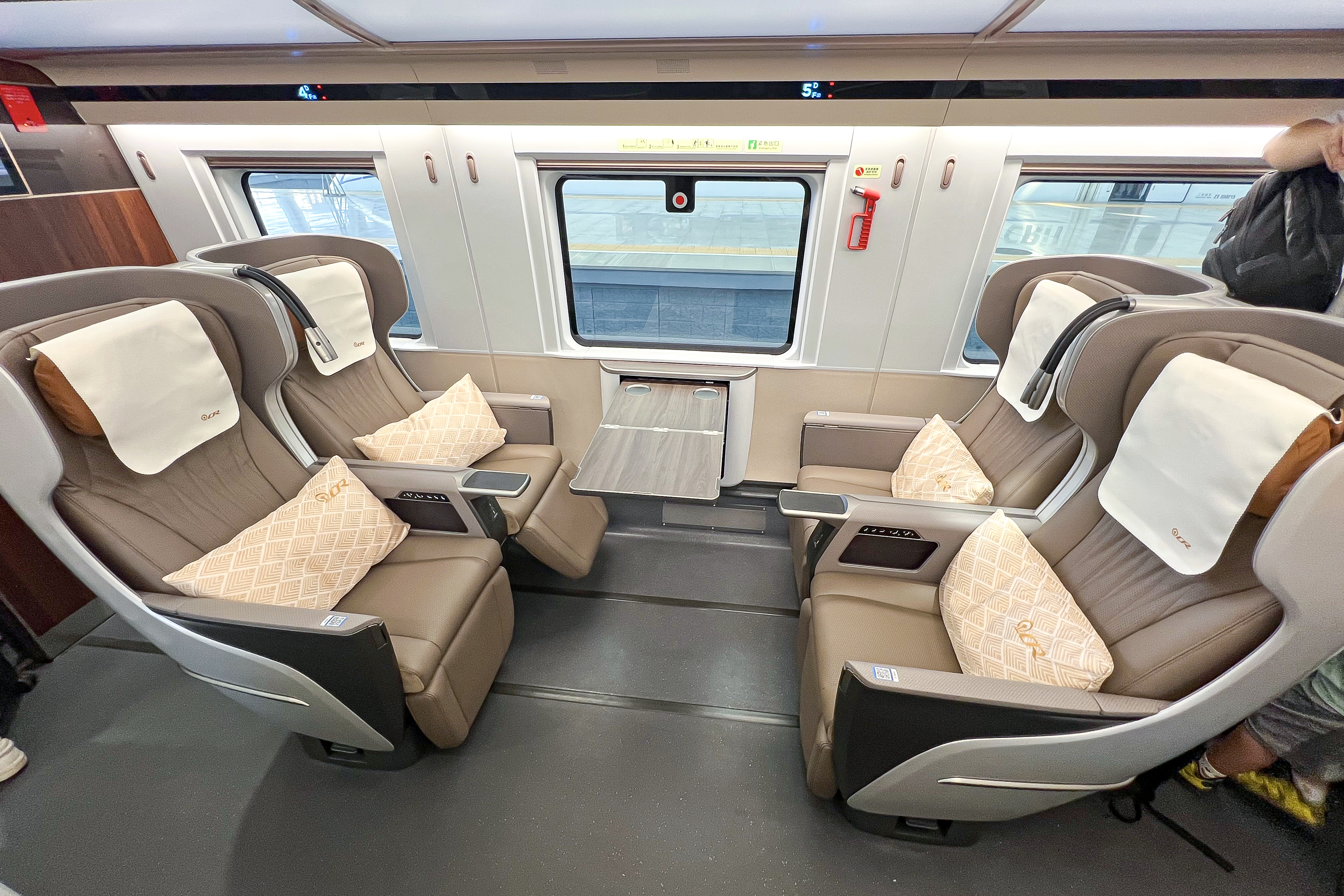
Premium first class on CR400BF-BS in meeting configuration

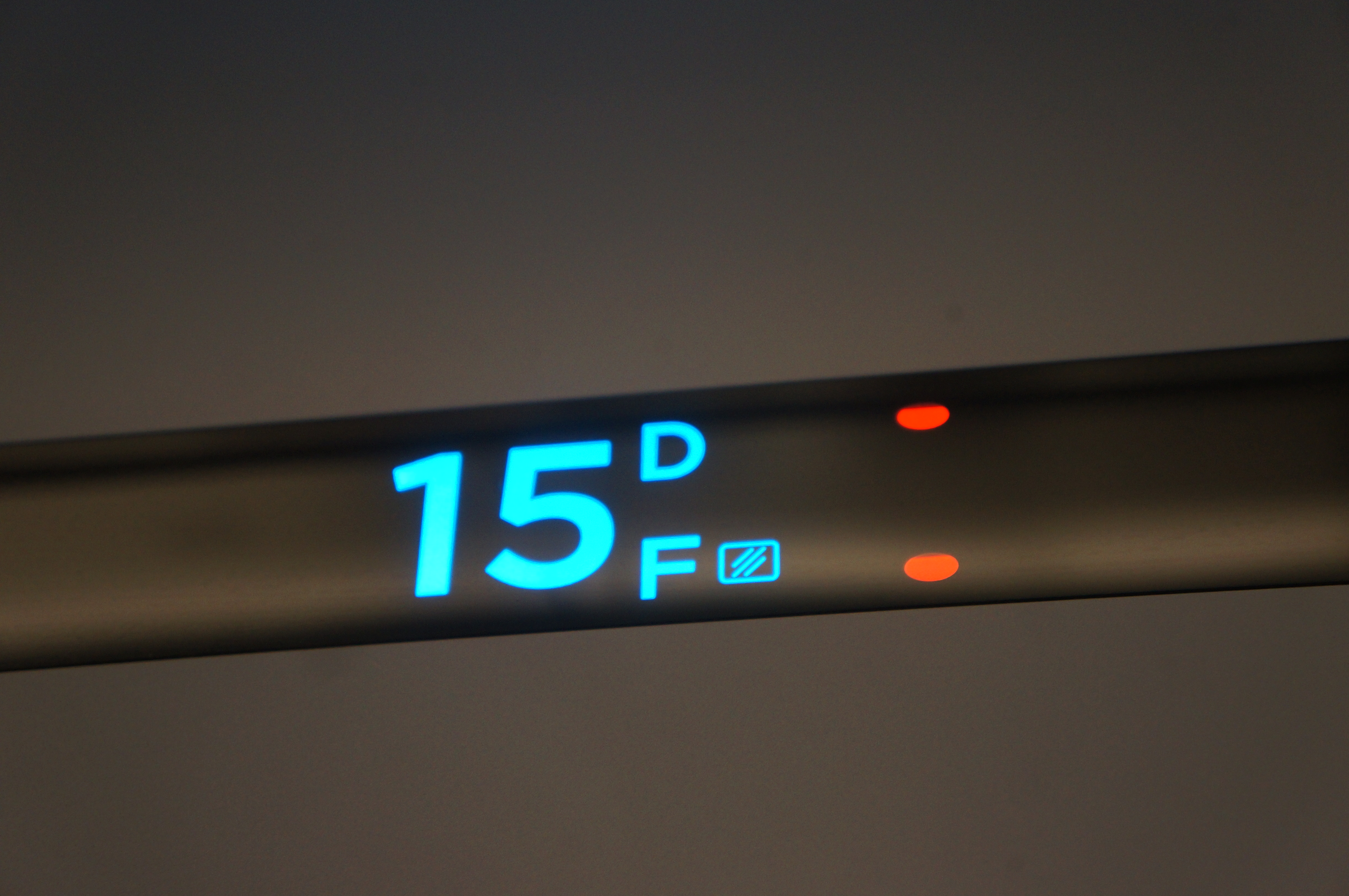
Seating sign on CR400BF with booking status indicators: red indicators refer to booked and green for empty.

== See also ==
- China Railway CR400AF
- China Railway CR300AF
- China Railway CR300BF
- China Railway High-speed, Chinese high-speed railway service provided by China Railway.
- China Railway, Chinese state-owned corporation that operates all Fuxing trains.
- Fuxing (train), the train brand CR400BF is part of.
