= List of high-speed trains =

The following is a list of high-speed trains that have been, are, or will be in commercial service. A high-speed train is generally defined as one which operates at or over 200 km/h (125 mph).

In these tables, two or three maximum speeds are given: the column "Operated" refers to the maximum speed reached by the train in commercial operations, while the column "Design" refers to the theoretical maximum speed in commercial operations as announced by the manufacturer. Finally, a third "Record" speed may also be listed if there is an independently verified speed record.

== Trainsets and multiple units ==
=== High-speed trains currently in service ===
Name	Operators	Family	Manufacturer	Power distribution	Power supply	Maximum speed (km/h)			In Service	Picture
Name	Operators	Family	Manufacturer	Power distribution	Power supply	Operated	Designed	Record	In Service	Picture
Acela Express	(United States) Amtrak	TGV & LRC derived	Alstom; Bombardier	concentrated (2 power cars)	25 kV 60 Hz AC; 12 kV 60 Hz AC; 12 kV 25 Hz AC	240 (150 mph)	266 (165 mph)	266 (165 mph)	2000	
Afrosiyob	Uzbekistan Railways	Talgo 250	Talgo	concentrated (2 power cars)	25 kV 50 Hz AC	250	250		2011	
AGV 575	(Italy) NTV	AGV	Alstom	distributed	25 kV 50 Hz AC; 3 kV DC	300	360		2012	
Alfa Pendular	(Portugal) CP	Pendolino	Fiat Ferroviaria; Adtranz; Siemens	distributed	25 kV 50 Hz AC	220	250		1999	
Alvia Class 120, 121 (variable gauge)	(Spain) Renfe		CAF; Alstom	distributed	25 kV 50 Hz AC; 3 kV DC	250	250		2004	
Alvia Class 130 (variable gauge)	(Spain) Renfe	Talgo 250	Talgo; Bombardier	concentrated (2 power cars)	25 kV 50 Hz AC; 3 kV DC	250	250		2007	
Alvia Class 730 (variable gauge)	(Spain) Renfe	Talgo 250	Talgo; Bombardier	concentrated (2 electric power cars, 2 diesel-generator trailers)	25 kV 50 Hz AC; 3 kV DC; Diesel (electric transmission)	250	250		2012	
Avant Class 104	(Spain) Renfe	Pendolino	Alstom; CAF	distributed	25 kV 50 Hz AC	250	250		2003	
Avant Class 114	(Spain) Renfe	New Pendolino	Alstom	distributed	25 kV 50 Hz AC	250	250		2009	
AVE Class 100	(Spain) Renfe	TGV	GEC-Alstom; CAF	concentrated (2 power cars)	25 kV 50 Hz AC; 3 kV DC	300	300	357	1992	
AVE Class 102, 112	(Spain) Renfe	Talgo 350	Talgo; Bombardier	concentrated (2 power cars)	25 kV 50 Hz AC	300	350	365	2005	
AVE Class 103	(Spain) Renfe	Velaro	Siemens	distributed	25 kV 50 Hz AC	300	350	403.7	2006	
AVE Class 106	(Spain) Renfe	Talgo AVRIL	Talgo; Bombardier	concentrated (2 power cars)	25 kV 50 Hz AC; 3 kV DC; 1.5 kV DC	300	380	363	2024	
Avelia Liberty (NextGen Acela)	(United States) Amtrak	TGV & New Pendolino derived	Alstom	concentrated (2 power cars)	25 kV 60 Hz AC; 12 kV 60 Hz AC; 12 kV 25 Hz AC	260 (160 mph)	350 (220 mph)	268.4 (166.8 mph)	2025	
BR Class 180	(United Kingdom) Grand Central	Coradia	Alstom	distributed	Diesel (hydraulic transmission)	201 (125 mph)	201 (125 mph)		2002	
BR Class 220	(United Kingdom) CrossCountry	Voyager	Bombardier	distributed	Diesel (electric transmission)	201 (125 mph)	201 (125 mph)		2001	
BR Class 221	(United Kingdom) CrossCountry (United Kingdom) Grand Central	Voyager	Bombardier	distributed	Diesel (electric transmission)	201 (125 mph)	201 (125 mph)		2002	Avanti Voyager departing Rugby 11.21
BR Class 222	(United Kingdom) East Midlands Railway	Voyager	Bombardier	distributed	Diesel (electric transmission)	201 (125 mph)	201 (125 mph)		2004	
BR Class 390	(United Kingdom) Avanti West Coast	Pendolino	Alstom	distributed	25 kV 50 Hz AC	201 (125 mph)	225 (140 mph)	248 (154 mph)	2002	
BR Class 395	(United Kingdom) Southeastern	A-train	Hitachi Rail	distributed	25 kV 50 Hz AC; 750 V DC (3rd rail)	225 (140 mph)	225 (140 mph)	252 (157 mph)	2009	
BR Class 397	(United Kingdom) TransPennine Express	CAF Civity	CAF	distributed	25 kV 50 Hz AC	201 (125 mph)	201 (125 mph)		2019	
BR Class 800	(United Kingdom) Great Western Railway (United Kingdom) London North Eastern Railway	A-train	Hitachi Rail	distributed	25 kV 50 Hz AC; Diesel (electric transmission)	201 (125 mph)	225 (140 mph)		2017	
BR Class 801	(United Kingdom) London North Eastern Railway	A-train	Hitachi Rail	distributed	25 kV 50 Hz AC	201 (125 mph)	225 (140 mph)		2019	
BR Class 802	(United Kingdom) Great Western Railway (United Kingdom) Hull Trains (United Kingdom) TransPennine Express	A-train	Hitachi Rail	distributed	25 kV 50 Hz AC; Diesel (electric transmission)	201 (125 mph)	225 (140 mph)		2018	
BR Class 803	(United Kingdom) Lumo	A-train	Hitachi Rail	distributed	25 kV 50 Hz AC	201 (125 mph)	225 (140 mph)		2021	
BR Class 805	(United Kingdom) Avanti West Coast	A-train	Hitachi Rail	distributed	25 kV 50 Hz AC; Diesel (electric transmission)	201 (125 mph)	225 (140 mph)		2024	
BR Class 807	(United Kingdom) Avanti West Coast	A-train	Hitachi Rail	distributed	25 kV 50 Hz AC	201 (125 mph)	225 (140 mph)		2024	
BR Class 810	(United Kingdom) East Midlands Railway	A-train	Hitachi Rail	distributed	25 kV 50 Hz AC; Diesel (electric transmission)	201 (125 mph)	225 (140 mph)		2025	
CRH1A-200; CRH1B; CRH1A-250	China Railway	Regina	Bombardier; CSR Sifang	distributed	25 kV 50 Hz AC	200	220		2007	
CRH1A-200; CRH1B; CRH1A-250	China Railway	Regina	Bombardier; CSR Sifang	distributed	25 kV 50 Hz AC	250	250		2009	
CRH1A-200; CRH1B; CRH1A-250	China Railway	Regina	Bombardier; CSR Sifang	distributed	25 kV 50 Hz AC	250	250	278	2010	
CRH1E	China Railway	Zefiro	Bombardier; CSR Sifang	distributed	25 kV 50 Hz AC	250	250		2009	
CRH1A-A; CRH1E-250	China Railway	Zefiro	Bombardier; CSR Sifang	distributed	25 kV 50 Hz AC	250	250		2016	
CRH2A; CRH2B; CRH2E	China Railway	Shinkansen derived	Kawasaki; CSR Sifang	distributed	25 kV 50 Hz AC	250	250		2007	
CRH2C (Stage 1)	China Railway	Shinkansen derived	Kawasaki; CSR Sifang	distributed	25 kV 50 Hz AC	300	300	394.2	2008	
CRH2C (Stage 2)	China Railway	Shinkansen derived	Kawasaki; CSR Sifang	distributed	25 kV 50 Hz AC	350	350		2010	
CRH2A-2460; CRH2E-NG; CRH2G	China Railway	CRH	CSR Sifang	distributed	25 kV 50 Hz AC	250	250		2016	
CRH2E-NG (Double Deck version)	China Railway	CRH	CSR Sifang	distributed	25 kV 50 Hz AC	250	250		2017	
CRH3A	China Railway	CRH	CNR Tangshan; CNR Changchun	distributed	25 kV 50 Hz AC	250	250		2017	
CRH3C (Stage 1)	China Railway	Velaro	Siemens; CNR Tangshan; CNR Changchun	distributed	25 kV 50 Hz AC	320	320	394.2	2008	
CRH3C (Stage 2)	China Railway	Velaro	Siemens; CNR Tangshan; CNR Changchun	distributed	25 kV 50 Hz AC	350	350	394.2	2009	
CRH5A	China Railway	New Pendolino	Alstom; CNR Changchun	distributed	25 kV 50 Hz AC	250	250		2007	
CRH5G	China Railway	CRH	CNR Changchun	distributed	25 kV 50 Hz AC	250	250		2017	
CRH5E	China Railway	CRH	CNR Changchun	distributed	25 kV 50 Hz AC	250	250		2019	
CRH6A	China Railway	Cinova	CSR Sifang	distributed	25 kV 50 Hz AC	200	220		2014	
CRH380A & AL	China Railway	CRH	CSR Sifang	distributed	25 kV 50 Hz AC	350	380	486.1	2010	
CRH380B, BL & BG	China Railway	Velaro	Siemens; CNR Tangshan; CNR Changchun	distributed	25 kV 50 Hz AC	350	380	487.3	2011	
CRH380CL	China Railway	Velaro derived	Hitachi Rail; CNR Changchun	distributed	25 kV 50 Hz AC	350	380		2013	
CRH380D	China Railway	Zefiro	Bombardier; CSR Sifang	distributed	25 kV 50 Hz AC	350	380	483	2012	
CR300AF	China Railway	Fuxing	CRRC Sifang	distributed	25 kV 50 Hz AC	250	300		2019	
CR300BF	China Railway	Fuxing	CRRC Changchun	distributed	25 kV 50 Hz AC	250	300		2019	
CR400AF, -A & -B	China Railway	Fuxing	CRRC Sifang	distributed	25 kV 50 Hz AC	350	400	420	2017	
CR400BF, -A & -B	China Railway	Fuxing	CRRC Tangshan; CRRC Changchun	distributed	25 kV 50 Hz AC	350	400	420	2017	
CR400AF-C	China Railway	Fuxing	CRRC Sifang	distributed	25 kV 50 Hz AC	350	400	420	2021	
CR400BF-C	China Railway	Fuxing	CRRC Tangshan; CRRC Changchun	distributed	25 kV 50 Hz AC	350	400	420	2019	
CR400AF, -xS & -xZ	China Railway	Fuxing	CRRC Sifang	distributed	25 kV 50 Hz AC	350	400	420	2021	
CR400BF, -xS & -xZ	China Railway	Fuxing	CRRC Tangshan; CRRC Changchun	distributed	25 kV 50 Hz AC	350	400	420	2021	
PKP ED250	(Poland) PKP Intercity	New Pendolino	Alstom	distributed	3 kV DC	200	250	291	2014	
ČD Class 680	(Czech Republic) ČD	Pendolino	Alstom	distributed	25 kV 50 Hz AC, 15 kV 16.7 Hz AC and 3 kV DC	200	230	237	2006	
RegioJet Class 666/Class 667	(Czech Republic) Regiojet	Pesa InterRegio200	Pesa	distributed	25 kV 50 Hz AC, 3 kV DC	200	200	200	2023	
ETR 460	(Italy) Trenitalia	Pendolino	Fiat Ferroviaria	distributed	3 kV DC	250	250		1994	Frecciabianca ETR.460 at Roma Termini
ETR 470	(Switzerland) SBB	Pendolino	Fiat Ferroviaria	distributed	3 kV DC 15 kV 16.7 Hz AC; 25 kV 50 Hz	200	250		1996–2014	
ETR 470	(Italy) Trenitalia	Pendolino	Fiat Ferroviaria	distributed	3 kV DC 15 kV 16.7 Hz AC; 25 kV 50 Hz	200	250		1996–2021	
ETR 470	(Greece) Hellenic Train	Pendolino	Fiat Ferroviaria	distributed	3 kV DC 15 kV 16.7 Hz AC; 25 kV 50 Hz	200	250		2022	
ETR 480 / ETR 485	(Italy) Trenitalia	Pendolino	Fiat Ferroviaria	distributed	3 kV DC; 25 kV 50 Hz AC	250	250		1997	FS ETR 485 45 (22756214670)
ETR 500 (2nd gen)	(Italy) Trenitalia		Alstom; Bombardier; AnsaldoBreda	concentrated (2 power cars)	25 kV 50 Hz AC; 3 kV DC; 1.5 kV DC (500F)	300	300	362	2000	
ETR 600	(Italy) Trenitalia	New Pendolino	Alstom	distributed	25 kV 50 Hz AC; 3 kV DC	250	250		2008	FS ETR600 Frecciargento (50704019146)
ETR 610	(Italy) Trenitalia	New Pendolino	Alstom	distributed	25 kV 50 Hz AC; 15 kV 16.7 Hz AC; 3 kV DC	250	250		2008	FS ETR610 711 (51740756190)
ETR 675	(Italy) NTV	New Pendolino	Alstom	distributed	25 kV 50 Hz AC; 3 kV DC	250	250		2017	
ETR 700 (Previously known as V250)	(Italy) Trenitalia (Previously (Netherlands) NS (Belgium) SNCB)		AnsaldoBreda	distributed	25 kV 50 Hz AC; 3 kV DC; 1.5 kV DC	250	250		2012 - 2013; 2019	
ETR 1000 (Frecciarossa 1000)	(Italy) Trenitalia (Spain) Iryo	Zefiro	Bombardier; AnsaldoBreda	distributed	25 kV 50 Hz AC; 3 kV DC; 1.5 kV DC; 15 kV 16.7 Hz AC	300	360	393.8	2015	
Electric Tilt Train	(Australia) Queensland Rail	Tilt Train	Walkers Limited	distributed	25 kV 50 Hz AC	160		210	1998	
Eurostar e300	(France) (United Kingdom) (Belgium) Eurostar	TGV derived	GEC-Alstom	concentrated with additional distributed traction (2 power cars, 2 pass. semi-motor cars)	25 kV 50 Hz AC; 3 kV DC; 1.5 kV DC; 750 V DC (3rd rail, no longer in use)	300 (190 mph)	300 (190 mph)	334.7 (208.0 mph)	1993	
Eurostar e320	(France) (United Kingdom) (Belgium) (Netherlands) Eurostar	Velaro	Siemens	distributed	25 kV 50 Hz AC; 15 kV 16.7 Hz AC; 3 kV DC; 1.5 kV DC	320 (200 mph)	320 (200 mph)	352 (219 mph)	2015	
Flytoget Class 78	(Norway) Flytoget	Oaris	CAF	distributed	15 kV 16.7 Hz AC	210	250		2021	
GMB Class 71	(Norway) Flytoget	X 2000 derived	Adtranz; Strømmen	distributed	15 kV 16.7 Hz AC	210	210		1998	
ICE 1	(Germany) DB	ICE	Siemens; ABB; AEG; KraussMaffei; Krupp; Thyssen; Henschel	concentrated (2 power cars)	15 kV 16.7 Hz AC	280	280	310	1991	
ICE 2	(Germany) DB	ICE	Siemens; Adtranz	concentrated (1 power car)	15 kV 16.7 Hz AC	280	280	316	1996	
ICE 3 Class 403	(Germany) DB	Velaro	Siemens; Bombardier	distributed	15 kV 16.7 Hz AC	300	330	363	2000	
ICE 3 Class 406	(Germany) DB	Velaro	Siemens; Bombardier	distributed	15 kV 16.7 Hz AC; 25 kV 50 Hz AC 1.5 kV DC; 3 kV DC	320	330		2000	
ICE 3 Class 407	(Germany) DB	Velaro	Siemens	distributed	15 kV 16.7 Hz AC; 25 kV 50 Hz AC; 1.5 kV DC 3 kV DC	320	320	352	2013	
ICE 3 Class 408	(Germany) DB	Velaro MS	Siemens	distributed	15 kV 16.7 Hz AC; 25 kV 50 Hz AC 1.5 kV DC; 3 kV DC	300	320	352	2022	
ICE T	(Germany) DB (Austria) ÖBB	ICE (contains Pendolino technology)	Siemens; Duewag; Fiat Ferroviaria	distributed	15 kV 16.7 Hz AC	230	230	255	2005	
ICE 4	(Germany) DB	ICE	Siemens; Bombardier (now Alstom)	distributed	15 kV 16.7 Hz AC	265	265	292	2017	
IC2	(Germany) DB	KISS	Stadler Rail	distributed	15 kV 16.7 Hz AC	200	200		2020	
Stadler KISS	(Austria) Westbahn	KISS	Stadler Rail	distributed	15 kV 16.7 Hz AC	200	200		2011	
SOKO	(Serbia) Srbija Voz	KISS	Stadler Rail	distributed	25 kV 50 Hz AC	200	200		2022	
Intercity Nieuwe Generatie	(Netherlands) NS	Coradia Stream	Alstom	distributed	25 kV 50 Hz AC 15 kV 16.7 Hz AC; 1.5 kV DC; 3 kV DC	200	200		2023	
KCIC400AF	(Indonesia) KCIC	Fuxing	CRRC Qingdao Sifang	distributed	27.5 kV 50 Hz AC	350	400	420	2023	
KTX-I	(South Korea) Korail	TGV derived	Alstom; Hyundai Rotem	concentrated (2 power cars)	25 kV 60 Hz AC	305	330		2004	
KTX-Sancheon	(South Korea) Korail	KTX	Hyundai Rotem	concentrated (2 power cars)	25 kV 60 Hz AC	305	330		2010	
KTX-Eum	(South Korea) Korail	KTX	Hyundai Rotem	distributed	25 kV 60 Hz AC	260	286		2020	
KTX-Cheongryong	(South Korea) Korail	KTX	Hyundai Rotem	distributed	25 kV 60 Hz AC	305	352		2024	
NSB Class 73	(Norway) Go-Ahead Norge (Norway) SJ Norge (Norway) Vy	X 2000 derived	Adtranz; Strømmen	distributed	15 kV 16.7 Hz AC	210	210		1999	
NSB Class 74/75	(Norway) Vy	FLIRT	Stadler Rail	distributed	15 kV 16.7 Hz AC	200	200		2012	
RABDe 500	(Switzerland) SBB	ICN	Alstom; Bombardier	distributed	15 kV 16.7 Hz AC	200	200		2000	
RABe 501	(Switzerland) SBB	SMILE	Stadler Rail	distributed	15 kV 16.7 Hz AC; 25 kV 50 Hz AC; 3 kV DC	250	250	275	2019	
RABe 502	(Switzerland) SBB	TWINDEXX	Bombardier	distributed	15 kV 16.7 Hz AC	200	200		2018	
RABe 503	(Switzerland) SBB	New Pendolino	Alstom	distributed	15 kV 16.7 Hz AC; 25 kV 50 Hz AC; 3 kV DC	250	250		2008	
Regio 2N (Z 56500)	(France) SNCF	Omneo	Bombardier	distributed	25 kV 50 Hz AC; 1.5 kV DC	200	200		2017	
EVS1/EVS2 Sapsan	(Russia) RZD	Velaro	Siemens	distributed	3 kV DC; 25 kV 50 Hz AC	250	350	290	2009	
SAR push-pull train	(Saudi Arabia) SAR		CAF	concentrated (1 power car)	Diesel (electric transmission)	200	200		2017	
UTY EMU-250	Uzbekistan Railways	KTX	Hyundai Rotem	distributed	25 kV 60 Hz AC	250	260		2026	
500 Series Shinkansen	(Japan) JR West	Shinkansen	Hitachi Rail; Kawasaki; Kinki Sharyo; Nippon Sharyo	distributed	25 kV 60 Hz AC	285	305		1997	
700-7000 Series Shinkansen	(Japan) JR West	Shinkansen	Hitachi Rail; Kawasaki; Kinki Sharyo; Nippon Sharyo	distributed	25 kV 60 Hz AC	285	300		2000	
N700 Series Shinkansen	(Japan) JR Central (Japan) JR Kyushu (Japan) JR West	Shinkansen	Hitachi Rail; Kawasaki; Kinki Sharyo; Nippon Sharyo	distributed	25 kV 60 Hz AC	300	360	332	2007	
N700A Series Shinkansen	(Japan) JR Central (Japan) JR West	Shinkansen	Hitachi Rail; Kawasaki; Kinki Sharyo; Nippon Sharyo	distributed	25 kV 60 Hz AC	300	360		2013	
N700S Series Shinkansen	(Japan) JR Central	Shinkansen	Nippon Sharyo	distributed	25 kV 60 Hz AC	300	360	362	2020	
N700S Series Shinkansen	(Japan) JR Kyushu	Shinkansen	Nippon Sharyo	distributed	25 kV 60 Hz AC	260	360		2022	
800 Series Shinkansen	(Japan) JR Kyushu	Shinkansen	Hitachi Rail	distributed	25 kV 60 Hz AC	260	285		2004	
E2-1000 Series Shinkansen	(Japan) JR East	Shinkansen	Hitachi Rail; Kawasaki; Nippon Sharyo; Tokyu Car	distributed	25 kV 50/60 Hz AC	275	275	362	2002	
E3 Series Shinkansen	(Japan) JR East	Shinkansen	Kawasaki; Tokyu Car	distributed	20/25 kV 50 Hz AC	275	275		1997	
E5 Series Shinkansen	(Japan) JR East	Shinkansen	Hitachi Rail; Kawasaki	distributed	25 kV 50 Hz AC	320	360	400	2011	
H5 Series Shinkansen	(Japan) JR Hokkaido	Shinkansen	Hitachi Rail; Kawasaki	distributed	25 kV 50 Hz AC	320	360		2016	
E6 Series Shinkansen	(Japan) JR East	Shinkansen	Hitachi Rail; Kawasaki	distributed	20/25 kV 50 Hz AC	320	360		2013	
E7 Series Shinkansen	(Japan) JR East	Shinkansen	Hitachi Rail; Kawasaki; J-TREC	distributed	25 kV 50/60 Hz AC	260	275		2014	
W7 Series Shinkansen	(Japan) JR West	Shinkansen	Hitachi Rail; Kawasaki; Kinki Sharyo	distributed	25 kV 50/60 Hz AC	260	275		2015	
E8 Series Shinkansen	(Japan) JR East	Shinkansen	Kawasaki	distributed	20/25 kV 50 Hz AC	300	300		2024	
Sm3	(Finland) VR	Pendolino	Fiat Ferroviaria; Rautaruukki; Transtech	distributed	25 kV 50 Hz AC	220	220	242	1995	
Sm6	(Finland) VR	Pendolino	Alstom	distributed	25 kV 50 Hz AC; 3 kV DC	220	220		2010–2022; 2025	
Talgo 350 SRO	(Saudi Arabia) SRO	Talgo 350	Talgo; Bombardier	concentrated (2 power cars)	25 kV 50 Hz AC	300	350		2018	
TCDD HT65000	(Turkey) TCDD Taşımacılık	Renfe Class 120	CAF	distributed	25 kV 50 Hz AC	250	250		2009	
TCDD HT80000	(Turkey) TCDD Taşımacılık	Velaro	Siemens	distributed	25 kV 50 Hz AC	250	300		2015	
TGV Atlantique	(France) SNCF	TGV	Alsthom	concentrated (2 power cars)	25 kV 50 Hz AC; 1.5 kV DC	300	300	515.3	1989	
TGV Réseau	(France) SNCF	TGV	GEC-Alsthom	concentrated (2 power cars)	25 kV 50 Hz AC; 1.5 kV DC; 3 kV DC	320	320		1993	
TGV Duplex	(France) SNCF	TGV	GEC-Alsthom	concentrated (2 power cars)	25 kV 50 Hz AC; 15 kV 16.7 Hz AC; 1.5 kV DC	320	320		1995	
TGV Océane	(France) SNCF	TGV	Alstom	concentrated (2 power cars)	25 kV 50 Hz AC; 15 kV 16.7 Hz AC; 1.5 kV DC	320	320		2017	
TGV POS-Duplex	(France) SNCF	TGV	Alstom	concentrated (2 power cars)	25 kV 50 Hz AC; 15 kV 16.7 Hz AC	320	320	574.8	2006	
TGV 2N2 (Avelia Euroduplex)	(France) SNCF (France) (Switzerland) TGV Lyria (Morocco) ONCF (Spain) Ouigo España	TGV	Alstom	concentrated (2 power cars)	25 kV 50 Hz AC; 15 kV 16.7 Hz AC; 1.5 kV DC; 3 kV DC	320	320		2011	
TGV M (Avelia Horizon)	(France) SNCF (France) Proxima (Morocco) ONCF (France) (United Kingdom) (Belgium) (Netherlands) (Germany) Eurostar	TGV	Alstom	concentrated (2 power cars)	25 kV 50 Hz AC; 15 kV 16.7 Hz AC; 1.5 kV DC; 3 kV DC	320	350		2026	
PBA	(France) (Belgium) (Netherlands) Eurostar	TGV	GEC-Alsthom	concentrated (2 power cars)	25 kV 50 Hz AC; 1.5 kV DC; 3 kV DC	320	320		1996	
PBKA	(France) (Belgium) (Netherlands) (Germany) Eurostar	TGV	GEC-Alsthom	concentrated (2 power cars)	25 kV 50 Hz AC; 15 kV 16.7 Hz AC; 1.5 kV DC; 3 kV DC	320	320		1997	
THSR 700T	(Taiwan) THSR	Shinkansen	Hitachi Rail; Kawasaki; Nippon Sharyo	distributed	25 kV 60 Hz AC	300	315	315	2007	
Transwa WDA/WDB/WDC class	(Australia) Transwa		United Goninan	distributed	Diesel (hydraulic transmission)	160	200		2004	
Vibrant Express	(Hong Kong) MTR Corporation	CRH	CRRC Qingdao Sifang	distributed	25 kV 50 Hz AC	350	380		2018	
X2	(Sweden) SJ	X 2000	Adtranz; ABB	concentrated (1 power car)	15 kV 16.7 Hz AC; 25 kV 50 Hz AC	200	210	276	1989	
X3	(Sweden) Arlanda Express	Coradia	GEC-Alsthom	distributed	15 kV 16.7 Hz AC	200	205		1998	
X40	(Sweden) SJ	Coradia	Alstom	distributed	15 kV 16.7 Hz AC	200	200		2006	
X50 - 55	(Sweden) SJ (Sweden) Vy Tåg (Sweden) Västtrafik (Sweden) Veolia Transport	Regina	Bombardier	distributed	15 kV 16.7 Hz AC	200	250	303	2000	
X74	(Sweden) VR Sverige	Stadler FLIRT	Stadler Rail	distributed	15 kV 16.7 Hz AC	200	200		2015	
ER1	(Sweden) Tåg i Bergslagen (TiB) (Sweden) Mälardalstrafik (Sweden) Vy Tåg	Stadler Dosto	Stadler Rail	distributed	15 kV 16.7 Hz AC	200	200		2019	
X80	(Sweden) Västtrafik	Zefiro	Bombardier	distributed	15 kV 16.7 Hz AC	200	200		2026	
Z-TER	(France) SNCF		Alstom; Bombardier	distributed	25 kV 50 Hz AC; 1.5 kV DC	200	200		2003	

=== High-speed trains no longer in service ===
Name	Operators	Family	Manufacturer	Power distribution	Power supply	Maximum speed (km/h)			In Service	Picture
Name	Operators	Family	Manufacturer	Power distribution	Power supply	Operated	Designed	Record	In Service	Picture
BR Class 370	(United Kingdom) InterCity	APT	BREL	concentrated (2 intermediate power cars)	25 kV 50 Hz AC	201 (125 mph)	250 (160 mph)	261 (162 mph)	1980–1986	
DJJ1 "Blue Arrow"	(China) Guangshen Railway		Zhuzhou Electric Locomotive Co	concentrated (1 power car)	25 kV 50 Hz AC	200	210	235.6	2000–2012	
DB Class 403 (1973)	(Germany) DB		AEG; BBC; Siemens	distributed	15 kV 16.7 Hz AC	200	220	225	1972–1993	
ER200	(Soviet Union) (Russia) RZD		RVR	distributed	3 kV DC	200	200	220	1984–2009	
ETR 450	(Italy) Trenitalia	Pendolino	Fiat Ferroviaria	distributed	3 kV DC	250	280		1988–2015	
ETR 500 (1st series)	(Italy) Trenitalia		AnsaldoBreda; Fiat Ferroviaria; Tecnomasio; Firema Trasporti	concentrated (2 power cars)	3 kV DC	250	300	321	1992–2007	
ICE TD	(Germany) DB (Denmark) DSB		Siemens	distributed	Diesel (electric transmission)	200	200	222	2001–2017	
ICE 3M Class 406	(Germany) DB (Netherlands) NS	Velaro	Siemens	distributed	15 kV 16.7 Hz AC 25 kV 50 Hz AC 1.5 kV DC 3 kV DC	320	330	368	2000-2024	
Budd Metroliner	(United States) Penn Central (United States) Amtrak		Budd Company	distributed	12 kV 25 Hz AC 12.5 kV 60 Hz AC	190	240	264	1969-1981	
RENFE Class 490	(Spain) Renfe	Pendolino	GEC-Alsthom; Fiat Ferroviaria	distributed	3 kV DC	220	220		1998–2014	
TGV Sud-Est	(France) SNCF (France) (Switzerland) TGV Lyria	TGV	Alsthom Francorail-MTE	Concentrated with additional distributed traction (2 power cars, 2 pass. semi-motor cars)	25 kV 50 Hz AC; 1.5 kV DC	300	300	380	1980–2020	
TGV Postal	(France) SNCF (on behalf of La Poste)	TGV	Alsthom Francorail-MTE	concentrated (2 power cars)	25 kV 50 Hz AC; 1.5 kV DC	270	270		1984–2015	
0 Series Shinkansen	(Japan) JNR (Japan) JR Central (Japan) JR West	Shinkansen	Hitachi Rail; Kawasaki; Kinki Sharyo; Nippon Sharyo; Kisha Seizo	distributed	25 kV 60 Hz AC	220	220		1964–2008	
100 Series Shinkansen	(Japan) JNR (Japan) JR Central (Japan) JR West	Shinkansen	Hitachi Rail; Kawasaki; Kinki Sharyo; Nippon Sharyo; Tokyu Car	distributed	25 kV 60 Hz AC	230	230	277.2	1985–2012	
200 Series Shinkansen	(Japan) JNR (Japan) JR East	Shinkansen	Hitachi Rail; Kawasaki; Kinki Sharyo; Nippon Sharyo; Tokyu Car	distributed	25 kV 50 Hz AC	240 (275 H sets)	275	276.2	1982–2013	
300 Series Shinkansen	(Japan) JR Central (Japan) JR West	Shinkansen	Hitachi Rail; Kawasaki; Kinki Sharyo; Nippon Sharyo	distributed	25 kV 60 Hz AC	270	270	325.7	1992–2012	
400 Series Shinkansen	(Japan) JR East	Shinkansen	Hitachi Rail; Kawasaki; Tokyu Car	distributed	20/25 kV 50 Hz AC	240	240	345	1992–2010	
700-0 Series Shinkansen	(Japan) JR Central (Japan) JR West	Shinkansen	Hitachi Rail; Kawasaki; Kinki Sharyo; Nippon Sharyo	distributed	25 kV 60 Hz AC	285	300		1999–2020	
700-3000 Series Shinkansen	(Japan) JR Central (Japan) JR West	Shinkansen	Hitachi Rail; Kawasaki; Kinki Sharyo; Nippon Sharyo	distributed	25 kV 60 Hz AC	285	300		1999–2020	
E1 Series Shinkansen	(Japan) JR East	Shinkansen	Hitachi Rail; Kawasaki	distributed	25 kV 50 Hz AC	240	240		1994–2012	
E4 Series Shinkansen	(Japan) JR East	Shinkansen	Hitachi Rail; Kawasaki	distributed	25 kV 50 Hz AC	240	240		1997–2021	

=== High-speed trains currently in development or under construction ===
Name	Operators	Family	Manufacturer	Power distribution	Power supply	Maximum designed speed (km/h)	Expected Service	Picture
B28	(India) NHSRCL		BEML; Integral Coach Factory	distributed	25 kV 50 Hz AC	280	2027	
American Pioneer 220	(United States) Brightline West	Velaro	Siemens Mobility	distributed	25 kV 60 Hz AC	380 (240 mph)	2029	
Bely Krechet	(Russia) RZD		Ural Locomotives	distributed	25 kV 50 Hz AC; 3 kV DC	400	2028	
BR Class 895	(United Kingdom) HS2 Operator	Zefiro	Alstom/Hitachi	distributed	25 kV 50 Hz AC	360 (220 mph)	2036	
BR Class 897	(United Kingdom) London North Eastern Railway	CAF Civity	CAF	distributed	25 kV 50 Hz AC; Diesel (battery)(electric transmission)	201 (125 mph)	2028	
CR450AF	China Railway	Fuxing	CRRC Sifang	distributed	25 kV 50 Hz AC	450	2026	
CR450BF	China Railway	Fuxing	CRRC Changchun	distributed	25 kV 50 Hz AC	450	2026	
DSB IC5	(Denmark) DSB	Coradia Stream	Alstom	distributed	25 kV 50 Hz AC 15 kV 16.7 Hz AC	200	2027	
Konstal Double-decker	(Poland) PKP	Coradia Max	Konstal	distributed	25 kV 50 Hz AC 15 kV 16.7 Hz AC	200	2029	
E10 Series Shinkansen	(Japan) JR East (India) NHSRCL	Shinkansen	Hitachi/Kawasaki	distributed	25 kV 50 Hz AC	320	2030	
EMU-370	(South Korea) Korail		Hyundai Rotem	distributed	25 kV 60 Hz AC	407	2031	
N700S Series Shinkansen	(Taiwan) THSR	Shinkansen	Hitachi/Toshiba		25 kV 60 Hz AC	360	2027	
Oxygène	(France) SNCF		CAF	distributed	25 kV 50 Hz AC; 1.5 kV DC	200	2027	
SJ 250	(Sweden) SJ	Zefiro	Alstom	distributed	15 kV 16.7 Hz AC	250	2028	
Talgo AVRIL	(France) Le Train	Talgo AVRIL	Talgo	concentrated (2 power cars)	25 kV 50 Hz AC; 1.5 kV DC	330	2028	
TCDD HT70000	(Turkey) TCDD Taşımacılık		TÜRASAŞ	distributed	25 kV 50 Hz AC	300	2027	

=== Prototypes, experimental or modified ===
Name	Operators	Family	Manufacturer	Power distribution	Power supply	Maximum speed (km/h)		In Service	Picture
Name	Operators	Family	Manufacturer	Power distribution	Power supply	Designed	Record	In Service	Picture
300X	(Japan) JR Central	Shinkansen	Hitachi Rail; Kawasaki; Mitsubishi Heavy Industries; Nippon Sharyo	distributed	25 kV 60 Hz AC	350	443	1994–2002	
ALFA-X	(Japan) JR East	Shinkansen	Hitachi Rail; Kawasaki	distributed	25 kV 50 Hz AC	400	400	2019-	
Class 951	(Japan) JNR	Shinkansen	Kawasaki; Nippon Sharyo	distributed	25 kV 60 Hz AC	250	286	1969—1973	
Class 961	(Japan) JNR	Shinkansen	Hitachi Rail; Kawasaki; Nippon Sharyo	distributed	25 kV 50/60 Hz AC	260	319	1973–1981	
Class 962	(Japan) JNR (Japan) JR East	Shinkansen	Hitachi Rail; Kawasaki; Kinki Sharyo; Nippon Sharyo; Tokyu Car	distributed	25 kV 50/60 Hz AC	210		1979—2003	
Class 1000	(Japan) JNR	Shinkansen	Hitachi Rail; Kawasaki; Kinki Sharyo; Nippon Sharyo; Kisha Seizo	distributed	25 kV 60 Hz AC	200	256	1962–1976	
CR220J	China Railway	Fuxing	CRRC	concentrated (1 power car)	25 kV 50 Hz AC	200	220	2026	
Fastech 360S	(Japan) JR East	Shinkansen	Hitachi Rail; Kawasaki	distributed	25 kV 50 Hz AC	360	405	2005—2009	
Fastech 360Z	(Japan) JR East	Shinkansen	Hitachi Rail; Kawasaki	distributed	20/25 kV 50 Hz AC	360	405	2005—2009	
STAR21	(Japan) JR East	Shinkansen	Hitachi Rail; Kawasaki; Nippon Sharyo	distributed	25 kV 50 Hz AC	350	425	1992–1998	
WIN350	(Japan) JR West	Shinkansen	Hitachi Rail; Kawasaki	distributed	25 kV 60 Hz AC	350	350	1992–1995	
GCT01 (1st generation)	(Japan) JR Kyushu	Shinkansen	Kawasaki, Kinki Sharyo, Tokyu Car	distributed	20/25 kV 50/60 Hz AC; 1500 V DC	300	246	1998–2006	
GCT01 (2nd generation)	(Japan) JR Kyushu	Shinkansen	Kawasaki, Kinki Sharyo, Tokyu Car	distributed	20/25 kV 60 Hz AC; 1500 V DC	270	?	2006–2013	
FGT9000	(Japan) JR Kyushu	Shinkansen	Kawasaki, Hitachi	distributed	20/25 kV 60 Hz AC; 1500 V DC	270	?	2014-	
HSR-350x	(South Korea) Korail	KTX	Hyundai Rotem	concentrated (2 power cars)	25 kV 60 Hz AC	385	352	2002—2008	
HEMU-430X	(South Korea) Korail	KTX	Hyundai Rotem	distributed	25 kV 60 Hz AC	430	421	2012—2017	
BR APT-E	(United Kingdom) British Rail	APT	British Rail Research Division	concentrated (2 power cars)	Gas turbine (electric transmission)	250 (160 mph)	245 (152 mph)	1972—1976	
ICE S	(Germany) DB	ICE	Siemens; Adtranz; AEG; DWA	concentrated (2 power cars)	15 kV 16.7 Hz AC		393	1996	
ICE V	(Germany) DB	ICE	Siemens; AEG; BBC; KraussMaffei; Krupp; Thyssen; Henschel	concentrated (2 power cars)	15 kV 16.7 Hz AC		407	1985–1998	
TGV 001	(France) SNCF	TGV	Alsthom; Brissonneau; MTE; Turbomeca; Jeumont-Schneider; Creusot-Loire	concentrated (2 power cars)	Gas turbine (electric transmission)	300	318	1972—1978	
M-497 Black Beetle	(United States) New York Central	Budd RDC derived	Budd Don Wetzel	concentrated (single railcar)	Turbojet engines		295.87 (183.85 mph)	1966	
Modified unit 325	(France) SNCF	TGV	Alstom	concentrated (2 power cars)	25 kV 50 Hz AC; 1.5 kV DC		515.3	1990	
TGV V150	(France) SNCF	TGV	Alstom	Concentrated with additional distributed traction (2 power cars, 2 pass. semi-motor cars)	25 kV 50 Hz AC; 15 kV 16.7 Hz AC	540	575	2007	
Schienenzeppelin	(Germany) Franz Kruckenberg	Schienenzeppelin	Franz Kruckenberg	concentrated (single railcar)	Petrol engine (with air propeller)		230	1929—1939	
ES250 Sokol	(Russia) RZD	ES250 Sokol	RAO VSM	distributed	3 kV DC 25 kV 50 Hz AC	250		2000—2002	
Talgo XXI (Talgo BT)	(Spain) ADIF	Talgo XXI	Talgo; KraussMaffei	concentrated (1 power car)	Diesel (hydraulic transmission)	200	256	1999-	
Talgo 330	(Spain) ADIF	Talgo 350	Talgo; Bombardier; KraussMaffei	concentrated (1 power car)	25 kV 50 Hz AC	300	336	2007-	
Talgo AVRIL G3	(Spain) Renfe	Talgo AVRIL	Talgo; Bombardier	concentrated (2 power cars)	25 kV 50 Hz AC; 3 kV DC	350	?	2012 —	
DJJ2 "China Star"	(China) Qinshen railway		Zhuzhou Electric Locomotive Co	concentrated (2 power cars)	25 kV 50 Hz AC	270	321.5	2002–2006	
CRH380AM	China Railway	CRH	CRRC Sifang	distributed	25 kV 50 Hz AC	500	500	2011	
High speed freight train	China Railway	Fuxing	CRRC Tangshan	distributed	25 kV 50 Hz AC		350	2020	

== Conventional locomotive-hauled ==
As trains can have multiple configurations on the same service, service name is used as an identifier.

=== Currently or soon in service ===
Service Name	Operators	Hauled trailers	Locomotive(s)	Loco family	Manufacturer	Formation	Power supply	Operated	Designed	Record	In Service	Picture
ComfortJet	(Czech Republic) České dráhy	Siemens Viaggio Comfort	383	Vectron	Siemens and Škoda Transportation	push-pull (loco + cab car)	25 kV 50 Hz AC; 15 kV 16.7 Hz AC 3 kV DC	230	230		2024	
InterJet	(Czech Republic) České dráhy	Siemens Viaggio Comfort	383	Vectron	Siemens and Škoda Transportation	conventional	25 kV 50 Hz AC; 15 kV 16.7 Hz AC 3 kV DC	160	200		2021	
ICE L	(Germany) Deutsche Bahn	Talgo 230	DB Class 105	Travca	Talgo	push-pull (loco + cab car)	25 kV 50 Hz AC; 15 kV 16.7 Hz AC 1.5 kV DC	200	230		2025	
FlixTrain	(Germany) (Sweden) Flix	UIC passenger coach types	DB Class 182, 383	Taurus Vectron	Siemens	conventional	25 kV 50 Hz AC; 25 kV 50 Hz AC 15 kV 16.7 Hz AC 3 kV DC	200	200		2017	
DB Intercity/ Eurocity	(Germany) Deutsche Bahn	DB Intercity carriages	DB Class 101 (previously DB Class 103, DB Class 120)		Adtranz	push-pull (loco + cab car)	15 kV 16.7 Hz AC	200	200		1965	
SBB IC/SBB IR	(Switzerland) SBB	IC 2000	Re 460		SLM/ABB	push-pull (loco + cab car)	15 kV 16.7 Hz AC	200	200		1997	
SBB IC/SBB IR	(Switzerland) SBB	Einheitswagen IV/SBB EC carriage	Re 460		SLM/ABB	push-pull (loco + cab car)	15 kV 16.7 Hz AC	200	200		1996	
Eurocity	(Switzerland) SBB	SBB EC carriage/Einheitswagen IV (restaurant only)	Depending on country: Re 460 / DB Class 101 / ÖBB Classes 1016/1116/1216			conventional	15 kV 16.7 Hz AC	200	200		1989	
Premier Service	(United Kingdom) Transport for Wales Rail	BR Mark 4/DVT	BR Class 67		Alstom	push-pull (loco + cab car)	EMD 12N-710G3B-EC Diesel	201 (125 mph)	201 (125 mph)		2000	
InterCity 125	(United Kingdom) ScotRail (United Kingdom) Network Rail (United Kingdom) Colas Rail (Mexico) Interoceanic Corridor of the Isthmus of Tehuantepec	BR Mark 3	BR Class 43		BREL	push-pull (2 locos)	Paxman VP185; MTU 16V4000 R41R; Paxman Valenta 12RP200L	201 (125 mph)	201 (125 mph)	238 (148 mph)	1975	
InterCity 225	(United Kingdom) London North Eastern Railway	BR Mark 4/DVT	BR Class 91	APT derived	BREL; Alstom	push-pull (loco + cab car)	25 kV 50 Hz AC	201 (125 mph)	225 (140 mph)	262 (163 mph)	1988	
DSB EuroCity	(Denmark) DSB	Litra EC	Litra EB	Vectron	Siemens	push-pull (loco + cab car)	25 kV 50 Hz AC 15 kV 16.7 Hz AC	200	200		2024	Litra EB Otto Busses Vej
Railjet	(Austria) ÖBB (Czech Republic) ČD	Siemens Viaggio Comfort	ES64U2	Taurus	Siemens	push-pull (loco + cab car)	15 kV 16.7 Hz AC 25 kV 50 Hz AC	230	230	275	2008	Endstation! ÖBB-Railjet in Zürich HB-20131011
MARC Penn Line	(United States) MARC		HHP-8	HHP-8	Bombardier Transportation	push-pull (loco + cab car)	12 kV 25 Hz AC 12.5 kV 60 Hz AC 25 kV 60 Hz AC Diesel	201 (125 mph)	217 (135 mph)		1998	
MARC Penn Line	(United States) MARC		SC-44	Charger	Siemens	push-pull (loco + cab car)	Cummins QSK95 Diesel	201 (125 mph)	201 (125 mph)		2018	
Northeast Regional	(United States) Amtrak	Amfleet I	ACS-64	Sprinter	Siemens	conventional	12 kV 25 Hz AC 12.5 kV 60 Hz AC 25 kV 60 Hz AC Diesel	201 (125 mph)	217 (135 mph)		1995	Amtrak ACS-64 650 SB at Wilmington Station
Northeast Regional	(United States) Amtrak	Amtrak Airo		Charger, Venture, Sprinter	Siemens	push-pull (loco + cab car)	12 kV 25 Hz AC 12.5 kV 60 Hz AC 25 kV 60 Hz AC Diesel	201 (125 mph)	217 (135 mph)		2027	
Keystone Service	(United States) Amtrak	Amtrak Airo		Charger, Venture, Sprinter	Siemens	push-pull (loco + cab car)	12 kV 25 Hz AC 12.5 kV 60 Hz AC 25 kV 60 Hz AC Diesel	201 (125 mph)	217 (135 mph)		2027	
Pennsylvanian	(United States) Amtrak	Amtrak Airo		Charger, Venture, Sprinter	Siemens	push-pull (loco + cab car)	12 kV 25 Hz AC 12.5 kV 60 Hz AC 25 kV 60 Hz AC Diesel	201 (125 mph)	217 (135 mph)		2027	
Carolinian	(United States) Amtrak	Amtrak Airo		Charger, Venture, Sprinter	Siemens	push-pull (loco + cab car)	12 kV 25 Hz AC 12.5 kV 60 Hz AC 25 kV 60 Hz AC Diesel	201 (125 mph)	217 (135 mph)		2027	
Palmetto	(United States) Amtrak	Amtrak Airo		Charger, Venture, Sprinter	Siemens	push-pull (loco + cab car)	12 kV 25 Hz AC 12.5 kV 60 Hz AC 25 kV 60 Hz AC Diesel	201 (125 mph)	217 (135 mph)		2027	
Vermonter	(United States) Amtrak	Amtrak Airo		Charger, Venture, Sprinter	Siemens	push-pull (loco + cab car)	12 kV 25 Hz AC 12.5 kV 60 Hz AC 25 kV 60 Hz AC Diesel	201 (125 mph)	217 (135 mph)		2027	
Brightline	(United States) Brightline	Siemens Venture	SCB-40	Charger	Siemens	push-pull (2 single-ended locos)	Cummins QSK95 Diesel	201 (125 mph)	201 (125 mph)		2018	
SNCB Intercity	(Belgium) SNCB	SNCB I11 & SNCB M6 & SNCB M7 & SNCB I10	HLE 13	Tractis	Alstom	push-pull (loco + cab car)	1.5 kV DC 3 kV DC 25 kV AC	200	200		1997	
SNCB Intercity	(Belgium) SNCB	SNCB I11 & SNCB M6 & SNCB M7 & SNCB I10	SNCB HLE 18 & HLE 19	EuroSprinter	Siemens	push-pull (loco + cab car)	1.5 kV DC 3 kV DC 25 kV 50 Hz AC	200	200		2011	
HellasSprinter	(Greece) Hellenic Train		OSE Class 120	Eurosprinter	Siemens	conventional	25 kV 50 Hz AC	200	200		1996	TRAINOSE Greece 25000V-50Hz AC
New South Wales XPT	(Australia) NSW TrainLink			HST derived	Comeng; ABB	push-pull (2 locos)	Paxman Valenta (as built) Paxman VP185 (from 2000)	160	200		1982	

=== No longer in service ===
Service Name	Type	Operators	Hauled trailers	Locomotive(s)	Loco family	Manufacturer	Formation	Power supply	Operated	Designed	Record	In Service	Picture
Le Capitole	Passenger	(France) SNCF	UIC-Y coaches / Grand Confort coaches	SNCF BB 9200 / SNCF CC 6500	BB Jacquemin / Nez cassé	Creusot-Loire, Jeumont-Schneider and Compagnie Électro-Mécanique / Alsthom and MTE	conventional	1.5 kV DC	200	200		1967—1991	
MVGV (Marchandises exploitées en régime Voyageurs à Grande Vitesse) / Train Bloc Express	Freight (postal)	(France) SERNAM (SNCF)	9 postal coaches (total 172 metres long, 297 tonnes)	SNCF BB 22200	Nez cassé	Alsthom and MTE	conventional	25 kV 50 Hz AC1500 V DC	200	200		1998—2010	
Guangzhou–Kowloon through train	Passenger	(Hong Kong) MTR Corporation	KTT	Re 460	Re 460	SLM; ABB; Kinki Sharyo	push-pull (2 locos)	25 kV 50 Hz AC	160	200		1998—2020	
Metroliner	Passenger	(United States) Amtrak	Amfleet	GG1 E60 HHP-8 AEM-7	Various	Various	conventional	12 kV 25 Hz AC 12.5 kV 60 Hz AC	201	201		1978-2006	
Metropolitan Express Train	Passenger	(Germany) DB	MET coaches / Grand Confort coaches	DB Class 101	DB Class 101	FTD Fahrzeugtechnik Dessau	push-pull (loco + cab car)	15 kV 16.7 Hz AC	220	220		1998–2021	
Strizh	Passenger	(Russia) RZD	Talgo 9	EP20	Alstom Prima derived	Transmashholding Talgo	conventional	3 kV DC 25 kV 50 Hz AC	200	200		2015—2022	
Nevsky Express with high-speed locomotives)	Passenger	(Russia) RZD	Tver works family	ChS200	Škoda 66E	Škoda	conventional	3 kV DC	200	200		2001—2024	
Nevsky Express with high-speed locomotives)	Passenger	(Russia) RZD	Tver works family	EP20	Alstom Prima derived	Transmashholding Alstom VELNII	conventional	3 kV DC 25 kV 50 Hz AC	200	200		2012—2025	

== Magnetically levitated ==
=== Currently or soon in service ===
Name	Operators	Family	Manufacturer	Power supply	Maximum speed (km/h)			In Service	Picture
Name	Operators	Family	Manufacturer	Power supply	Operated	Designed	Record	In Service	Picture
Shanghai Transrapid	(China) SMTD	Transrapid	Siemens; ThyssenKrupp	Electromagnetic suspension	431 (300 since May 2021)	431	501	2004	
L0 Series Shinkansen	(Japan) JR Central	Shinkansen	Mitsubishi Heavy Industries; Nippon Sharyo	Electrodynamic suspension		505	603	2027	

=== Experimental ===
Name	Operators	Family	Manufacturer	Power supply	Maximum speed (km/h)		In Testing	Picture
Name	Operators	Family	Manufacturer	Power supply	Designed	Record	In Testing	Picture
ML500	(Japan) JNR	Shinkansen	Railway Technical Research Institute	Electrodynamic suspension		517	1977—1981	
MLU001	(Japan) JNR (Japan) JR Central	Shinkansen	Railway Technical Research Institute	Electrodynamic suspension		405	1981—1989	
MLU002	(Japan) JR Central	Shinkansen	Railway Technical Research Institute	Electrodynamic suspension		394	1987—1991	
MLU002N	(Japan) JR Central	Shinkansen	Railway Technical Research Institute	Electrodynamic suspension		431	1993—1996	
MLX01	(Japan) JR Central	Shinkansen	Mitsubishi Heavy Industries; Nippon Sharyo	Electrodynamic suspension		581	1996—2011	
Transrapid 04	(Germany) Transrapid	Transrapid	Siemens; KraussMaffei	Electrodynamic suspension		253	1973–1977	
Transrapid 06	(Germany) Transrapid	Transrapid	Siemens; KraussMaffei	Electromagnetic suspension		412.6	1983–1988	
Transrapid 07	(Germany) Transrapid	Transrapid	Siemens; ThyssenKrupp	Electromagnetic suspension		450	1987–1993	
Transrapid 08	(Germany) Transrapid	Transrapid	Siemens; ThyssenKrupp	Electromagnetic suspension	431	501	1999–2006	
Transrapid 09	(Germany) Transrapid	Transrapid	Siemens; ThyssenKrupp	Electromagnetic suspension	431	505	2006–2007	

== See also ==
- List of speed records in rail transport
