= Frecciarossa 1000 =

Italian high-speed trainset

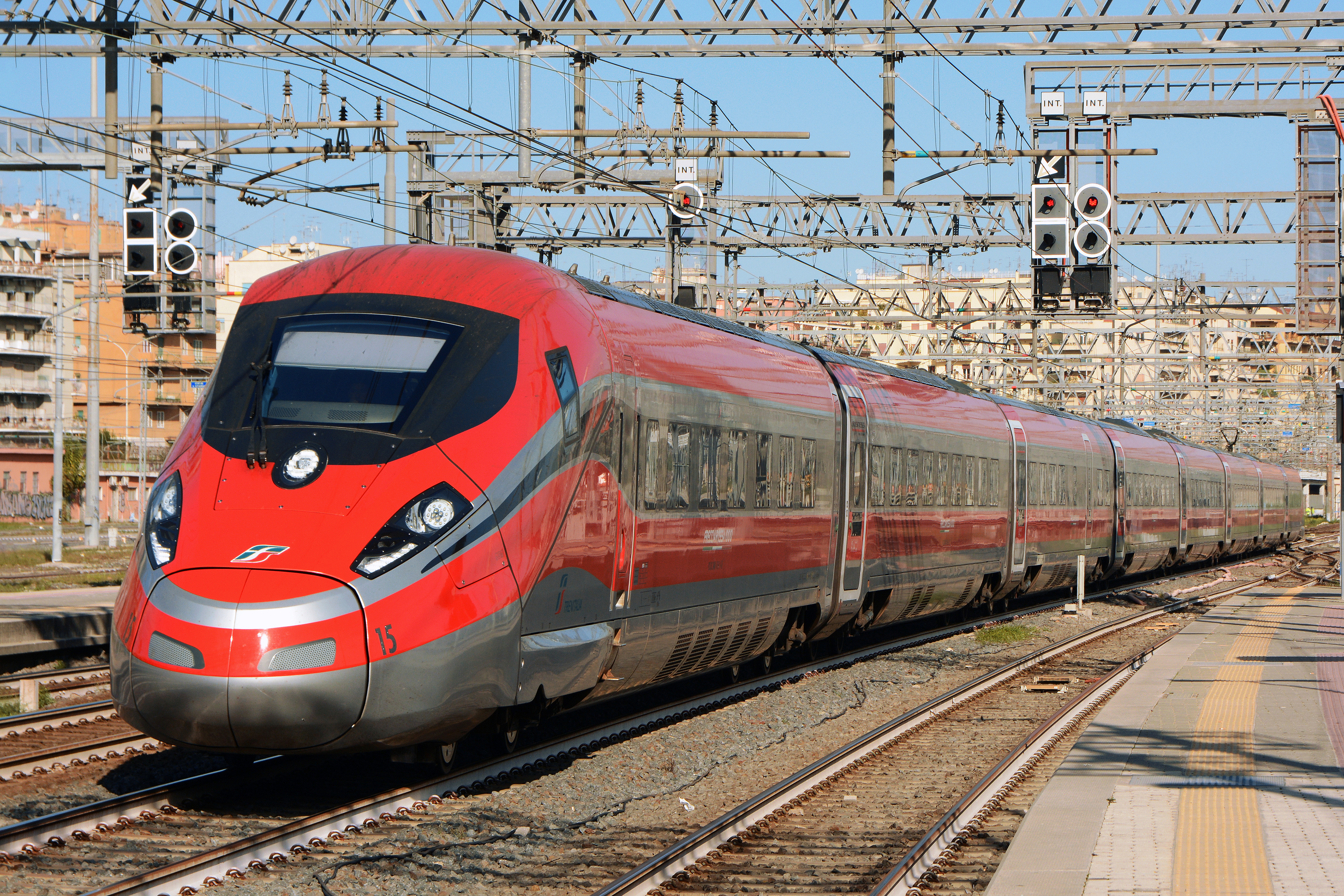
- Manufacturers: Hitachi Rail Italy (since 2013) (Note: Known as AnsaldoBreda until 2015)); Bombardier Transportation Italy (2013–2020); Alstom (2020–2021)
- Designers: Mike Robinson and Bertone
- Built at: Pistoia; Vado Ligure (2013–2021)
- Family name: Zefiro V300; ETR 1000 (IT), Serie 109 (ES), commercial Frecciarossa 1000
- Constructed: 2013–present
- Entered service: 14 June 2015
- Number under construction: 14 (ordered), 23 (optional)
- Number built: 50 trainsets (3 out of service, damaged in Livraga, Adamuz and Urda)
- Formation: 4M4T; 1 Executive car, 1 Business car, 1 Business car with a bar-bistro, 1 Premium car, 4 Standard cars.
- Capacity: 457 (Executive, 10; Business, 69; Premium, 76; Standard, 300; and wheelchair, 2)
- Operators: Trenitalia; Iryo
- Lines served: Italy: Torino-Milano-Bologna-Firenze-Roma-Napoli-Salerno-(Potenza-Taranto); Venezia-Padova-Bologna-Firenze-Roma-Napoli-Salerno; Spain: Madrid–Zaragoza–Barcelona; Sevilla-Córdoba-Madrid; Valencia-Cuenca-Madrid; France: Paris-Lyon-Avignon-Marseille; International: Paris-Lyon-Chambéry-Modane-Torino-Milano

Specifications
- Car body construction: Aluminium alloy
- Train length: 202 m (662 ft 9 in)
- Width: 2,924 mm (9 ft 7.1 in)
- Height: 4,080 mm (13 ft 5 in)
- Floor height: 1,240 mm (49 in)
- Doors: 28 (total)
- Wheel diameter: 920 mm (36 in)
- Maximum speed: Service: 300 km/h (186 mph); Design (commercial speed): 360 km/h (225 mph); Design (max speed): 400 km/h (250 mph)
- Weight: 500 t (490 long tons; 550 short tons)
- Axle load: 17 t (17 long tons; 19 short tons)
- Traction system: Water-cooled IGBT–VVVF inverter control
- Traction motors: 16 × 3-phase AC induction motor
- Power output: 9,800–10,000 kW (13,100–13,400 hp)
- Tractive effort: 370 kN (83,000 lb_{f})
- Acceleration: 0.7 m/s/s (1.6 mph/s)
- Deceleration: 1.2 m/s/s (2.7 mph/s)
- Electric systems: Overhead line: 25 kV 50 Hz AC; 15 kV 16 2/3 Hz AC (not active); 3,000 V DC; 1,500 V DC
- Current collection: Pantograph
- UIC classification: B'o B'o + 2′2′+ B'o B'o′+ 2′2′+ 2′2′+ B'o B'o + 2′2′+ B'o B'o
- Braking systems: Regenerative, dynamic, electro-pneumatic
- Safety systems: ERTMS, ETCS, SCMT, ASFA, LZB, TVM 430
- Track gauge: 1,435 mm (4 ft 8 1/2 in) standard gauge

Notes/references

The Frecciarossa 1000 (also known as ETR 1000) is a high-speed train operated by Trenitalia in Italy and by Iryo in Spain. It was developed by a joint venture of Bombardier Transportation (now part of Alstom) and AnsaldoBreda (now Hitachi Rail Italy). With a design speed of up to 400 km/h (250 mph), it is among the fastest trains in commercial production in Europe, although operation in Italy is limited to 300 km/h (186 mph) due to infrastructure constraints.

== History and design ==
=== Early work ===
During the mid 2000s, Italian state railway operator Ferrovie dello Stato became increasingly interested in the acquisition of a new very-high-speed train for its Eurostar Alta Velocità Frecciarossa (Eurostar high speed Red Arrow) services along the Turin-Milan-Florence-Rome-Naples corridor. Having become aware of this interest, Italian rail manufacturer AnsaldoBreda and multinational conglomerate Bombardier Transportation decided to partner up to produce a suitable train in 2008. It was decided to centralise design work by the joint venture at a single location, working out of an office at Bombardier's manufacturing plant at Hennigsdorf.

The emergent design was a 200-metre (656 ft 2 in)-long eight car non-articulated single decker train with distributed traction, capable of reaching a maximum speed of 350 kilometres per hour (220 mph); it was heavily based on elements of Bombardier's Zefiro V300 and AnsaldoBreda's existing V250 designs. According to rail industry publication Rail Engineer, Bombardier personnel were responsible for conducting the concept and detailed design phases of development, as well as for the provision of propulsion equipment and bogies, homologation efforts, testing, and the commissioning of the first five trains. Meanwhile, AnsaldoBreda developed the train's industrial design, including body, interior, signalling and other systems, in addition to performing the final assembly and commissioning of series production trains. Both firms were involved in detail design and engineering activity.

Italian vehicle manufacturer and design company Gruppo Bertone was involved in the designing of the train's aesthetics and appearance. It was instructed to produce a style that accentuated its elegance and speed, but would also conform with various international railway standards, such as driver visibility, crash protection, and headlight functionality. Bertone's design was reviewed by the team and subject to various tests, including the use of a wind tunnel, which proved it had compliant drag coefficients and crosswind stability levels. The train's design includes an active suspension system.

Having been deemed suitable for presentation, the vehicle design, was designated the Zefiro 300, was submitted by the joint venture as a response to Ferrovie dello Stato's tender for 50 new high-speed trainsets. Initial specifications were for a train meeting European high-speed technical standards, with a design commercial speed of 360 kilometres per hour (220 mph), initially operated at 300 kilometres per hour (190 mph), and tested to 400 kilometres per hour (250 mph). Other requirements included the train being suitable for a condition-based maintenance programme, while it was capable of being operated across seven different European countries, specifically the railway systems of Austria, Belgium, France, Germany, Netherlands, Spain and Switzerland.

The maximum speed specified by the tender exceeded that of the initial design, thus the design team was reassembled by AnsaldoBreda's Pistoia facility for a period of six months to revise the design to comply with the requirements outlaid. Reportedly, the new top speed required a detailed reexamination of the design, and in some cases the redesign, to be performed for various elements of the train, including the bogies, power and control systems and pantograph. While the train was only fitted with ERTMS Level 2 and the legacy Italian signalling system, passive provisions also had to be found for a number of other signalling systems that had been listed in the requirement.

=== Selection and delivery ===
During August 2010, it was announced that Trenitalia had awarded the contract to the Bombardier/Ansaldo joint venture, and that the first example was set to come into revenue service during 2013. The bid was determined to have been less expensive at €30.8m per train than the €35m per train cost given by the other bidder, French manufacturer Alstom. The contract value was €1.54bn of which Bombardier's share was €654m. Marco Sacchi, Hitachi Rail Italy's head of engineering, attributed the outcome as having been a result of the specially developed solutions involved in the train's design that had gained Trenitalia's favour. The joint venture moved into the detailed design phase immediately following news of the selection.

During August 2012, a full-scale mock up of the train was publicly unveiled at Rimini by the Italian Prime Minister Mario Monti. By this point, the train has received its official service designation, the 'Frecciarossa 1000'. On 26 March 2013, the first trainset was unveiled during a public ceremony at the Ansaldo-Breda facilities in Pistoia; this train was formally named Pietro Mennea, in memory of the Italian world record holder of the 200 metres track sprint event from 1979 to 1996, who had died five days earlier.

The train underwent extensive testing to be certified to operate on the Italian high-speed rail network at 360 kilometres per hour (220 mph). During August 2013, testing commenced on the Genoa-Savona line, before being transferred to conducting night time runs held between Milan and Bologna. On 25 April 2015, it was announced that the testing phase of development had been successfully completed. To mark the occasion, a special inaugural service featuring various high-profile guests, including the president of Italy, Sergio Mattarella, was performed between Milan and Rome.

=== Into service ===
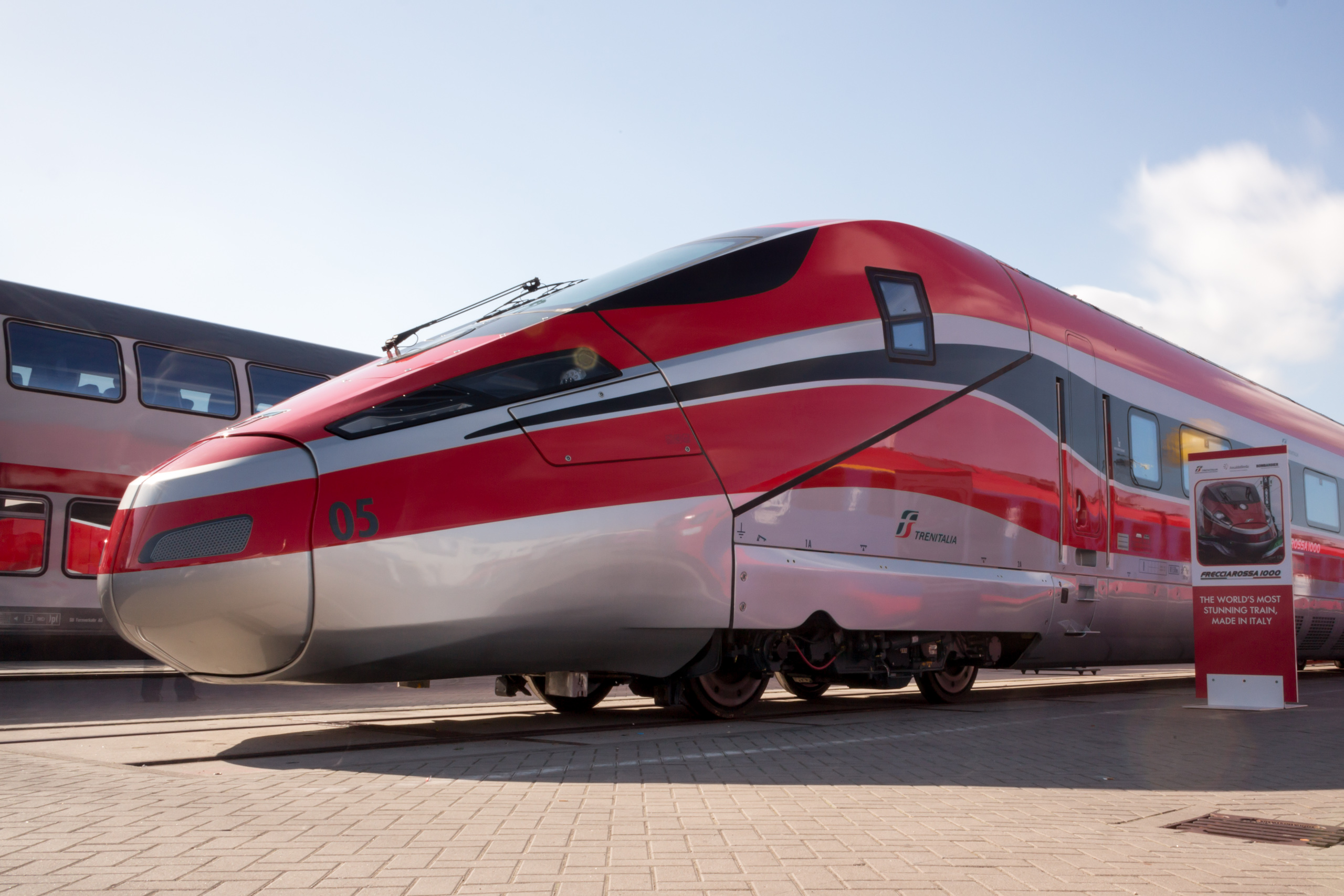
Rail car at InnoTrans 2014

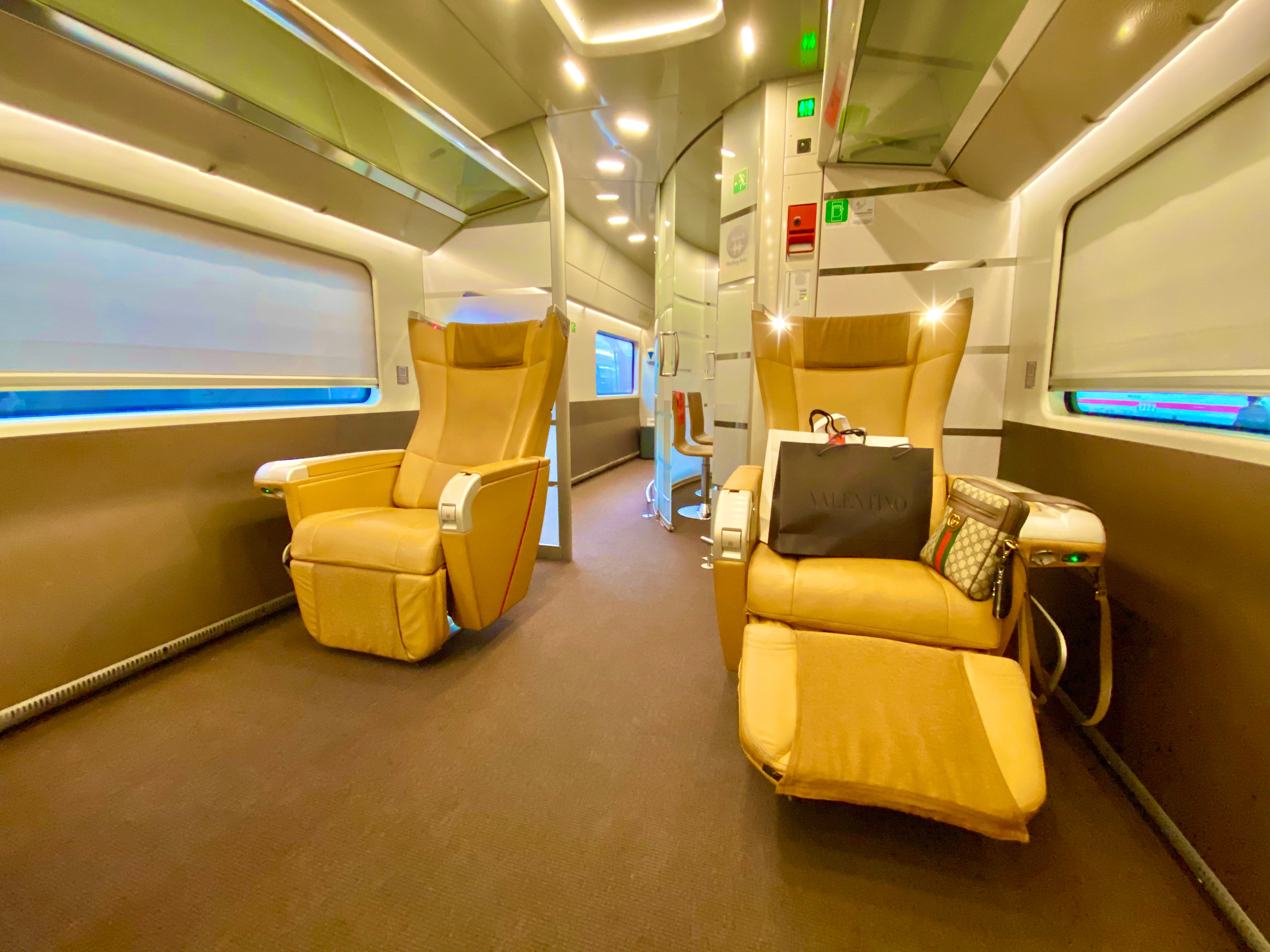
Executive class interior

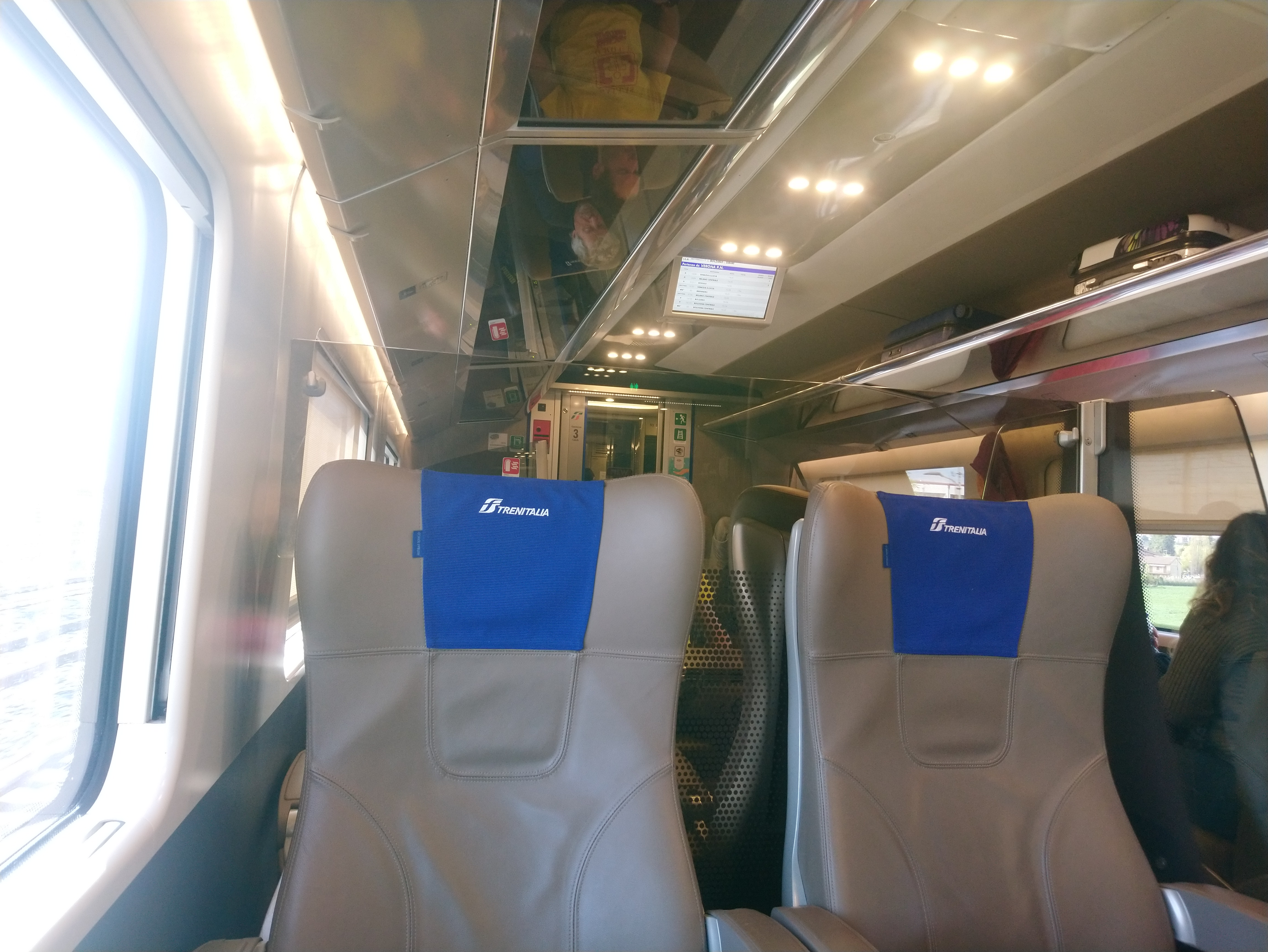
Business class interior

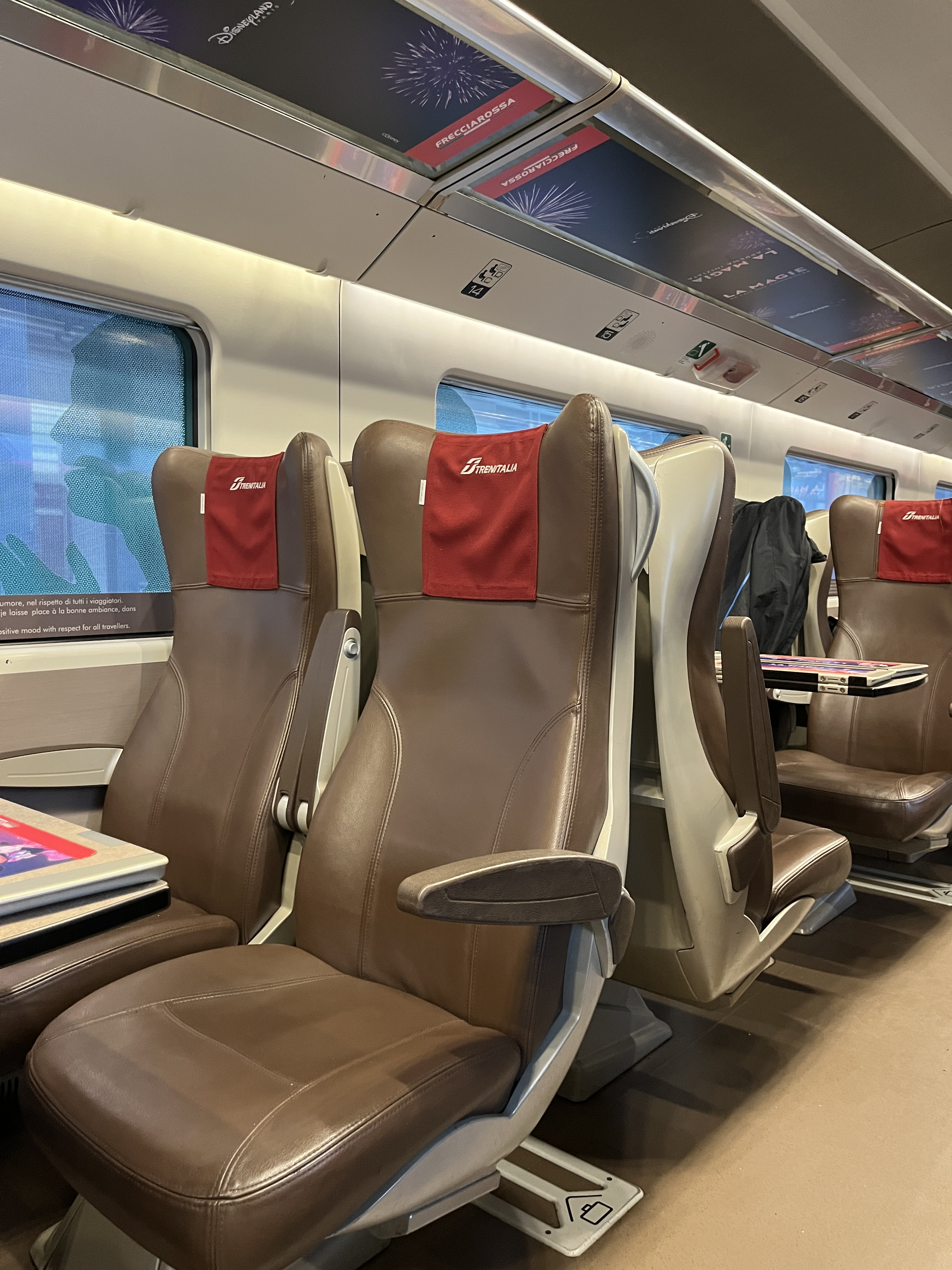
Economy class interior

During June 2015, commercial services using the type commenced, having officially entered service for Expo 2015. According to Bombardier, following the first three months of service, Trenitalia had reported back to them that they had experienced the easiest introduction of a new train into service in their history with the type, and that it had attained all of its reliability targets. The number of services performed by the type have gradually expanded as further examples have been delivered from the assembly line; as of September 2016, a total of 36 trains were in revenue service. At one point, trains were reportedly leaving the factory at the rate of two per week.

The introduction of the ETR 1000 shall enable Trenitalia to redeploy its existing ETR 500 high-speed trains onto other routes, such as Milan – Venice and the Adriatic coast. Early on, it was also declared by FS president Marcello Messori that the Frecciarossa 1000 enables Trenitalia to compete in the international high-speed market, and that it would be approved for operation in France, Germany, Spain, Austria, Switzerland, the Netherlands, and Belgium. On 28 October 2015, Trenitalia acknowledged that it was holding preliminary discussions between its suppliers and regulatory bodies regarding its interest in the prospective launch of an open access high speed service between Paris and Brussels; Pietro Diamantini of FS Group's Passenger Division stated that it could be the first international corridor on which the ETR 1000-Frecciarossa would be deployed.

On 26 November 2015, it was reported that one of the ETR 1000-Frecciarossa eight-car sets reached 389 km/h (242 mph) during testing; however, under normal initial conditions, the trains will be limited to 300 km/h (190 mph) as this remains the maximum permitted speed on the Italian high-speed network. On 26 February 2016, a Frecciarossa 1000 reportedly attained a peak speed of 393.8 km/h (245 mph) while traversing the Torino-Milano high speed line. On 28 May 2018, the Italian Ministry of Infrastructure and Transport and the ANSF announced that no further tests will be carried out and the speed limit of 300 kilometres per hour (190 mph) will not be raised.

After applying for French approval in 2019, Frecciarossa 1000 services between Paris and Milan began in December 2021.

== Spain ==
In 2022, the Spanish railway company Iryo (owned by ILSA, Intermodalidad de Levante S.A.) began service, having ordered a fleet of twenty S 109 trainsets similar to the Italian units Frecciarossa 1000.

== Accidents and incidents ==
- On 6 February 2020, unit number 21 was involved in a high-speed derailment at Livraga (Lodi), on the Milan-Bologna high-speed line, operating the first service of the day. It caused the death of the two train drivers and the injury of 31 people.
- On 18 January 2026 at 19:39 CET, unit number 109-012 was involved in a major derailment near Adamuz, Córdoba. The accident was initiated when a Frecciarossa 1000 operated by Iryo, traveling on the adjacent track, derailed and obstructed the path of the oncoming Renfe Class 120. The resulting collision led to the derailment of the Class 120 unit. The disaster resulted in 46 fatalities and 292 injuries.
- On 28 October 2026, around 09:00 CET (8:00 GMT), a Renfe Class 103 ran into the rear of a stationary unit operated by Iryo in Urda, Toledo, on the same line. At least 69 people died and more than 100 were injured.

== See also ==
- Alstom AGV
- British Rail Class 895 – a fork of the Zefiro V300 platform intended for High Speed 2 in the UK
- CAF Oaris
- Siemens Velaro
- Frecciarossa
