= Livraga derailment =

Derailment of an Italian train in 2020

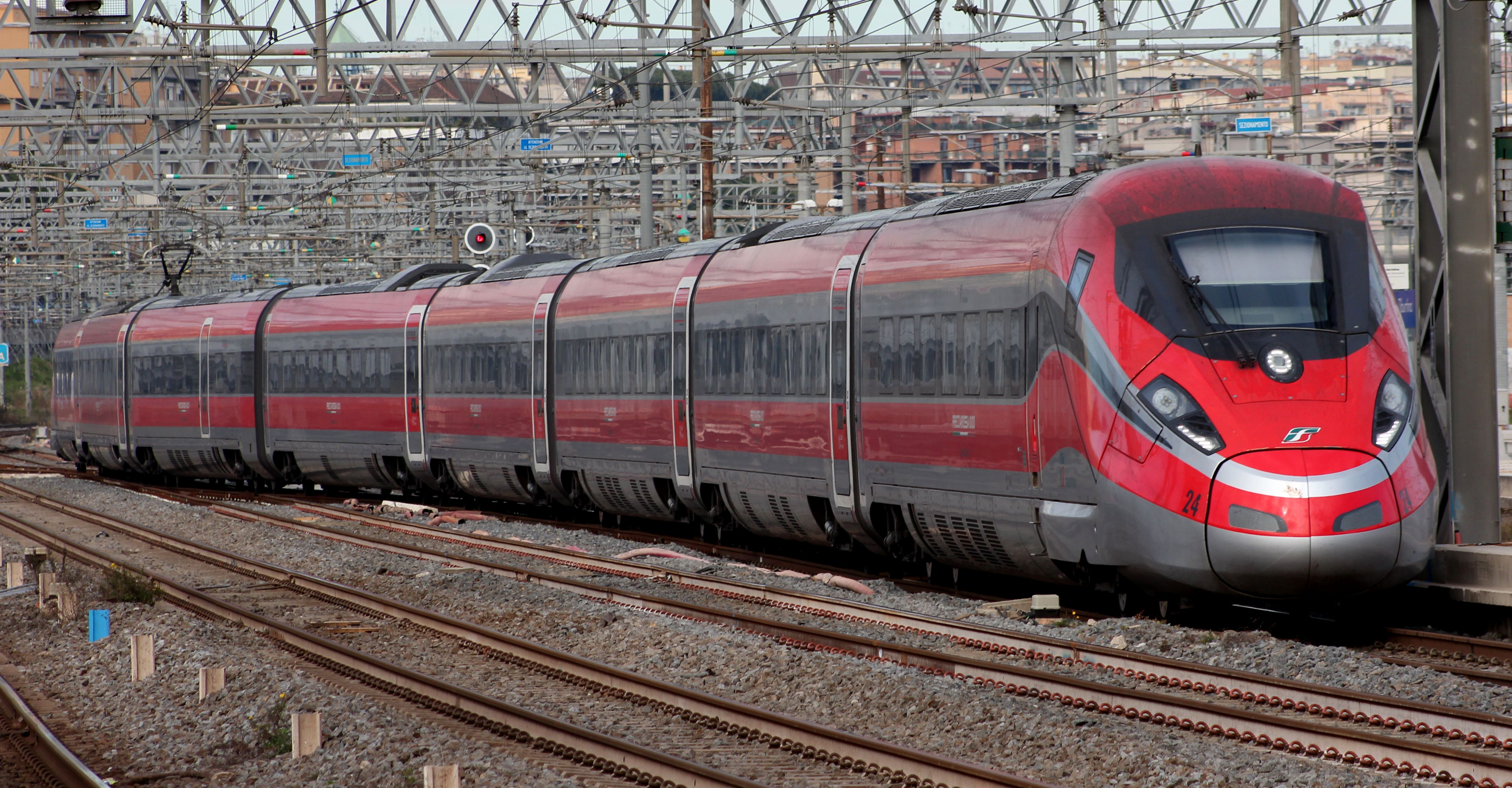
- A Frecciarossa 1000 trainset identical to the one involved.

Details
- Date: 6 February 2020; 6 years ago
- Location: Livraga, Lombardy
- Coordinates: 45.188820°N 9.567314°E
- Country: Italy
- Line: Milan–Bologna high-speed railway
- Operator: Trenitalia
- Service: Milan-Salerno
- Incident type: Derailment
- Cause: Incorrect points position

Statistics
- Trains: 1
- Passengers: 28
- Crew: 5
- Deaths: 2
- Injured: 31

The Livraga derailment is the only railway accident to date on the Italian high speed rail network. It took place on 6 February 2020 when a high-speed train derailed at Livraga, Lombardy, Italy. Two people died and 31 were injured.

== Derailment ==
Train 9595 was the first southbound service of any day in Italy's high speed railways, scheduled to start from Milan at 5:10 and to arrive in Salerno at 11:27. On 6 February 2020, the train, run by Frecciarossa 1000 trainset no. 21, entered the Milan-Bologna high-speed railway and reached its top speed as usual. Not long after departure it reached the "posto di movimento Livraga", a site equipped with passing loops where RFI maintenance vehicles are parked named after the nearby town of Livraga.

For reasons under investigation, on that morning points number 5 (which connects the main line to the passing loop) was unknowingly in diverted position. At 05:34 local time (04:34 UTC), upon passing on points number 5, the train was unexpectedly diverted to the passing loop; since the train was travelling at about 300 km/h (190 mph), while the points were designed to be traversed in diverted position at no more than 100 km/h (62 mph), the train suddenly derailed.

Coach 1 and 2 were automatically decoupled by the train's derailment detection system. The first coach spun round through 180 degrees, collided with some maintenance vehicles, and finally came to rest overturned near a railway building. The remaining seven coaches, instead, remained upright and kept going straight with their wheels on the track ballast, until they stopped after a few hundred metres.

Of the 33 people on the train, five staff and 28 passengers, only the two drivers died.

Two people were seriously injured. Railway workers in Italy called a two-hour strike starting at midday, 7 February 2020.

== Investigation ==
The investigation immediately focused on the points where the derailment occurred, revealing that it had been installed a mere hours before the crash, with train 9595 being the first one to travel on the renovated section.

During the previous night, an RFI maintenance team had been tasked with the replacement of the points actuator. However, when the job was done at 4:30 AM, the points didn't behave as expected: the Bologna control room saw the points as in "indefinite position", and mantainers couldn't figure out why. Since the resumption of traffic was scheduled in less than one hour, it was decided to take the points offline (disabling its remote operability) and set it to a fixed straight position, so that passing train could use the line, until the signalling problem would be addressed on the next night.

Such temporary override procedure was allowed to take place if work couldn't be completed overnight, and under normal circumstances (i.e. if the junction was really straight), all services on the line could have safely continued their journeys at full speed.

What caused the crash is the fact that, despite being set to "straight" in the switchboard, the rail was actually in diverted position—as it was found after the disaster. The inconsistent behaviour of the points was soon traced down to the points actuator, manufactured by Alstom in a Florence plant, which was found to have faulty internal cabling that caused the points to be straight when commanded to be diverted, and diverted when commanded to be straight.

This went unnoticed because the control room had no feedback on the effect of commands given to points actuators (they could see the commanded position, but not the actual position). In the next week, RFI rushed to locate and put out of order all other actuators produced within the same lot.

The trial for manslaughter, which took place in the court of Lodi, ruled that the disaster was caused by "the concatenation of several unlawful conducts, each relevant to the disaster, even if none alone was sufficient to determine it". Jail sentences were issued to the maintenance workers who installed the points (for failing to check that the points was actually straight before leaving), to an Alstom factory worker (for inverting the wires), to the factory tester (for failing to notice the faulty product), and to RFI's national production manager (for deficiencies in the procedures to verify consistency between the position of points and electronic signalling).
