= British Rail Class 895 =

Trains for the British High Speed 2 rail line

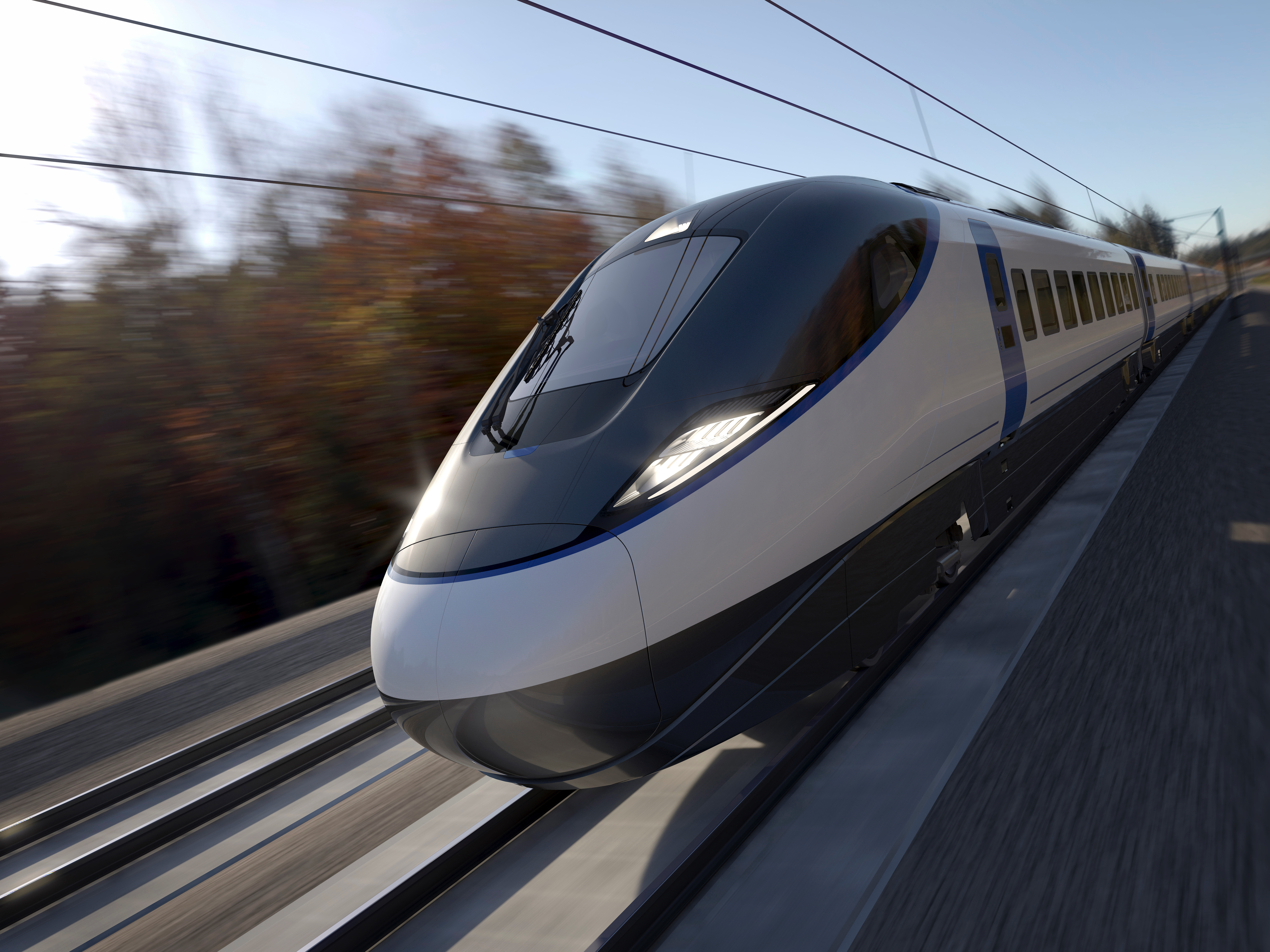
- Proposed design of rolling stock as of 2021
- Stock type: Electric multiple unit
- Manufacturer: Hitachi–Alstom High Speed (HAH-S) joint venture
- Built at: Hitachi Newton Aycliffe and Alstom Derby and Crewe
- Family name: Zefiro
- Constructed: Planned from 2027
- Number under construction: 54
- Formation: 8 cars
- Fleet numbers: 895001–895054
- Capacity: 504 seats
- Depot: Washwood Heath
- Lines served: High Speed 2, West Coast Main Line

Specifications
- Car body construction: Aluminium
- Train length: 200 m (656 ft)
- Maximum speed: 360 km/h (225 mph)
- Electric system: 25 kV 50 Hz AC overhead line
- Current collection: Pantograph
- Safety systems: ETCS, AWS, TPWS
- Track gauge: 1,435 mm (4 ft 8 1/2 in) standard gauge

The British Rail Class 895 is a type of electric multiple unit train on order for the under-construction High Speed 2 (HS2) high-speed rail line in the United Kingdom.

The contract was awarded to Hitachi–Alstom High-Speed (HAH-S), a 50/50 joint venture between Hitachi Rail and Alstom, for 54 trains, which will be constructed in the United Kingdom. The trains will be based on an evolution of the Zefiro V300 platform and able to run at a top operational speed of 360 km/h (225 mph). The 200 m-long (656 ft) electric multiple units (EMUs) will have the option to couple two units together to create a 400 m (1,312 ft) train.

The trains are designed to be 'conventional compatible', capable of leaving the dedicated high-speed sections to continue onto existing lines, and will be gauge-compatible with its planned operational routes where the loading gauge would be more restricted.

In March 2026, the UK government opened discussions with the joint venture to revise the contract after the cancellation of HS2 beyond Birmingham raised questions about the number and length of trains required for the network.

== History ==
=== Procurement ===
A modelling of costs and risks in the project in 2012 estimated that captive trains may cost around £27 million per train and the conventional compatible trains, to be built for the United Kingdom loading gauge, could have cost around £40 million.

The order for rolling stock for HS2 was specified in the Train Technical Specification issued with the Invitation To Tender (ITT), which was initially published in July 2018, being revised in March 2019 following clarification questions from tendering companies.

Five bids were shortlisted for the first HS2 rolling stock contract:

- Alstom
- Bombardier Transportation and Hitachi Rail. This partnership built Frecciarossa 1000 high-speed trains in Italy. Bombardier was later acquired by Alstom, making the bid a partnership between Alstom and Hitachi.
- CAF – based on its Oaris platform.
- Talgo – based on the AVRIL platform.
- Siemens – based on the Velaro Novo.

In the previously planned phase 2b, a number of 'captive' trains (unable to use the existing rail network) may have been ordered to operate alongside the conventional compatible trains, with a similar loading gauge to existing European high speed trains.

On 9 December 2021, the contract was awarded to the Hitachi Rail-Alstom joint venture.

A legal challenge by Talgo was settled out of court. Siemens sought an injunction to stop the contract being awarded, claiming Hitachi and Alstom were only able to make the lowest offer because they had not kept to the tender conditions, and later sought damages. It has been reported that this is to help it secure contracts for other elements of the HS2 project. The case brought by Siemens was dismissed by the High Court, and judged it was "not entitled to any damages".

The contract was to be awarded in spring 2020, but was delayed due to delays to the start of HS2 construction. The contract was then scheduled for October 2021 but was not awarded until December 2021 as it awaited government approval.

In March 2026, the UK government opened discussions with the joint venture to revise the contract following the cancellation of HS2 beyond Birmingham in 2023. Officials were reported to be considering reducing the planned 54 train order and modifying train lengths to suit the revised network and platform constraints on the West Coast Main Line, including at stations such as Manchester Piccadilly. The trains had originally been designed to operate in 400 m formations formed of two 200 m units. Revising the contract could result in penalty payments or compensation to the manufacturers.

=== Development ===
Beginning in 2024, market research with 20 user groups involving more than 500 people was carried out using wooden mock-ups of the trains. In August 2025, these mock-ups were showcased at The Greatest Gathering, an event held at Alstom’s Derby Litchurch Lane Works as part of the Railway 200 campaign celebrating “200 years of the modern railway”. HS2 Ltd announced that the new fleet would be designated Class 895 under the TOPS system. Production of the trains is scheduled to begin in 2027.

Tests will involve climate chambers, static tests at Derby, low-speed test tracks, Network Rail's Rail Innovation & Development Centres (RIDCs), and the Velim test centre in the Czech Republic. Dynamic testing is also expected to take place on HS2 and the conventional rail network. On HS2, tests will take place between Washwood Heath and north of the Chiltern tunnels. This will involve an approximately 80 km (50 mi) mostly above-ground stretch of track, including acceleration, deceleration, and validation of overrun protection systems.

== Design ==
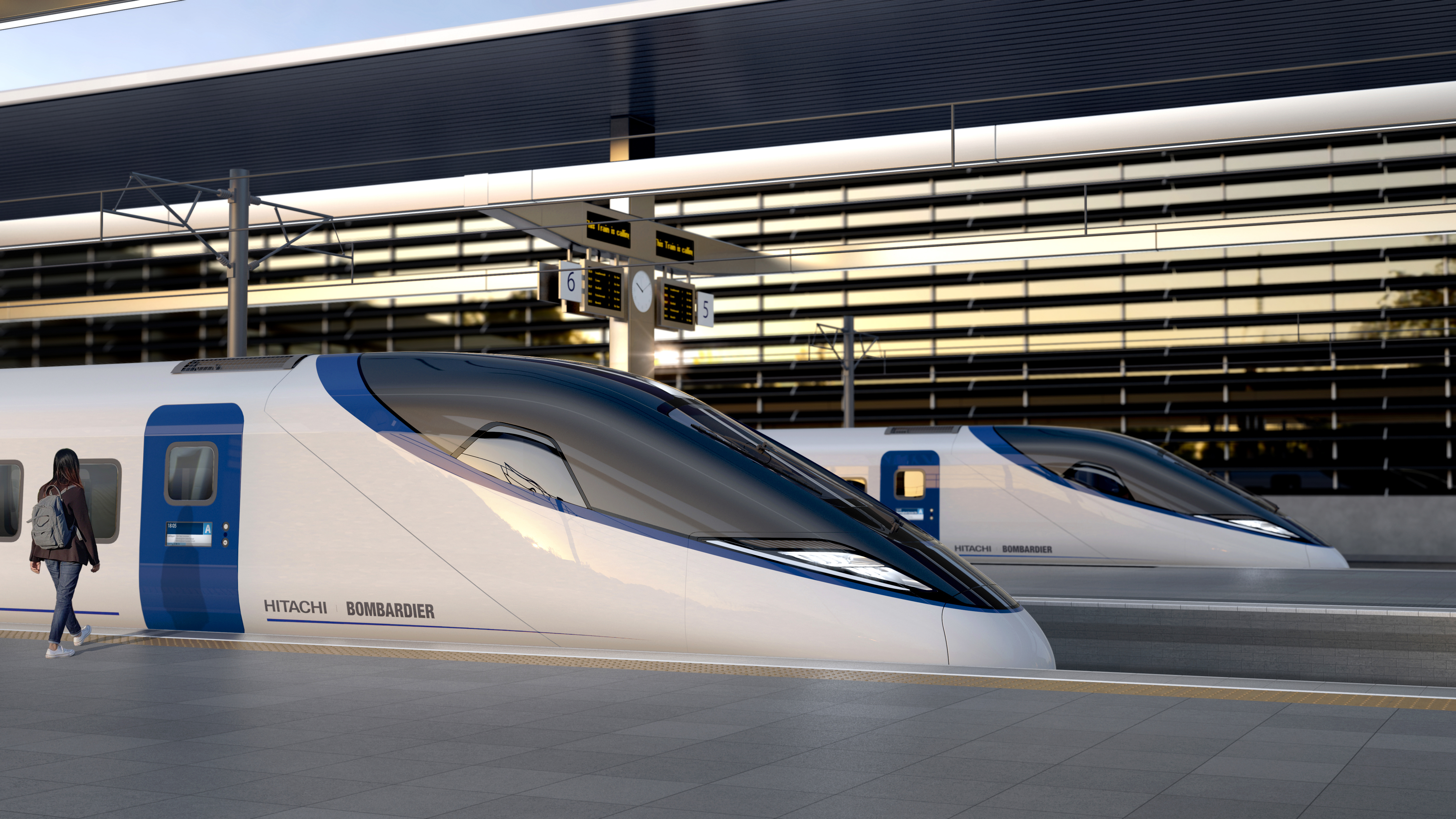
Rendering of train at platform (prior to Alstom's acquisition of Bombardier Transportation)

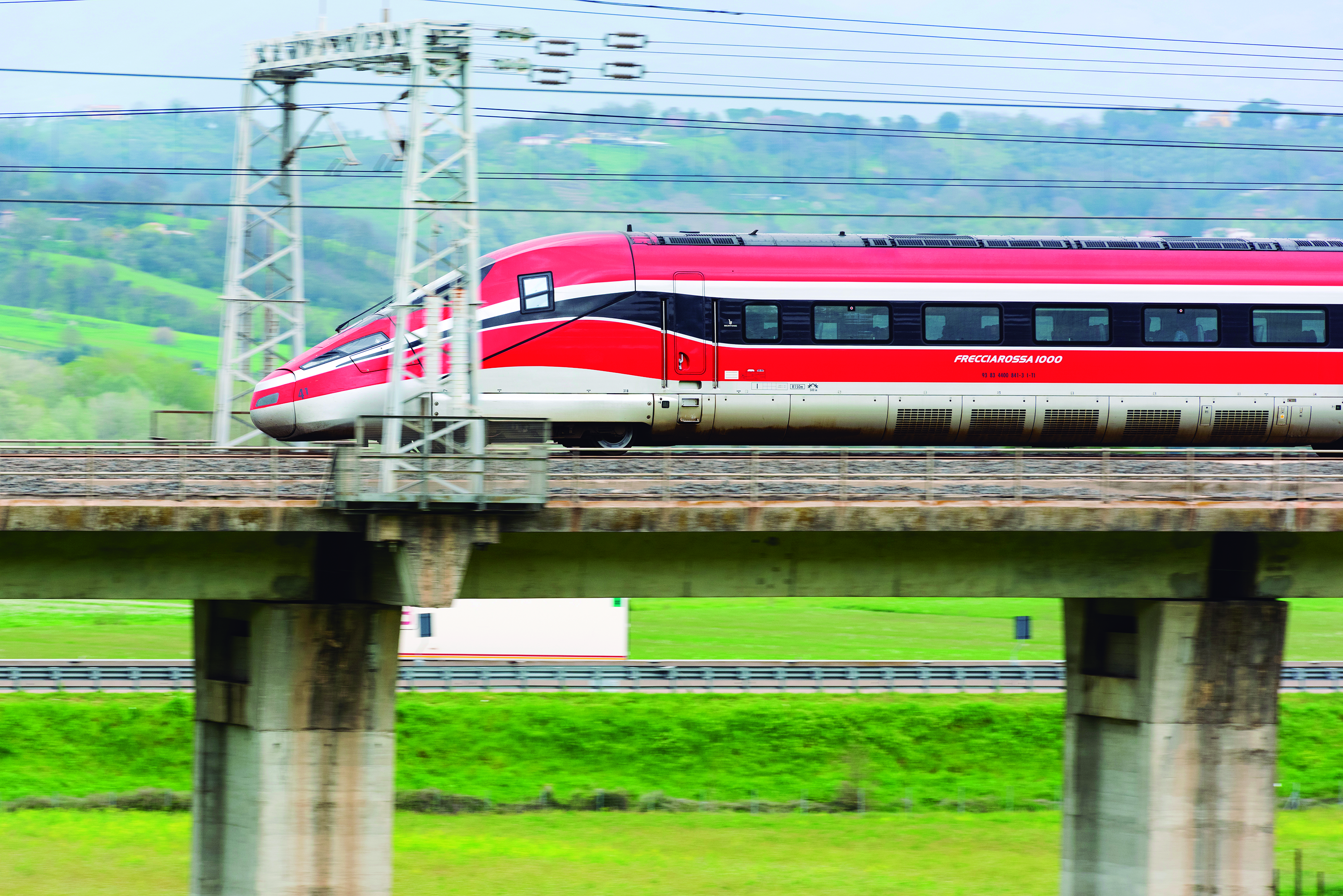
An ETR1000 operated by Trenitalia, an example of the Zefiro series of trains

The contract to build the 54 conventional compatible trains is worth £1.97 billion, which includes an initial 12-year maintenance contract for the trains, with the option to extend this to the 35-year design life of the trains.

Vehicle body assembly and initial fitting out of the trains will take place at the Hitachi Newton Aycliffe factory, the bogies will be manufactured at the Alstom Crewe Works, and final assembly and fit-out, including the interiors, electronics and bogies, will take place at Alstom's Derby Litchurch Lane Works.

The trains will feature regenerative braking and Hitachi Rail's low noise pantograph, whilst also being 15% lighter and feature 30% more seats than comparable high speed trains in Europe. The trains will also be the fastest trains in the United Kingdom and in Europe.

Standard class seats will have 87 cm (34 inches) of leg room, and seats will recline without encroaching on other passengers' space. Each seat will have a fold-down table, a shelf for small items, a reading light with three brightness levels, a coat hook, a USB-C and three-pin power socket. The glass used for overhead luggage racks will be frosted, unlike recent British trains. Trains will have slightly more headroom than on current British trains, with mechanical equipment taking up less space. Each train will have four bookable bicycle spaces.

The interior layout will be decided following a two and a half year design process involving HS2 Ltd, the Department for Transport and the West Coast Partnership.

The trains became the first in the world to achieve the BSI's PAS 2080 global accreditation for meeting environmental targets to reduce carbon emissions, such as by improving aerodynamics, using energy-efficient traction systems and lightweight, recycled content. As part of efforts to reduce energy consumption by improving its aerodynamics, it has been designed with a smooth underside.
