= CAF Oaris =

High-speed train built by CAF

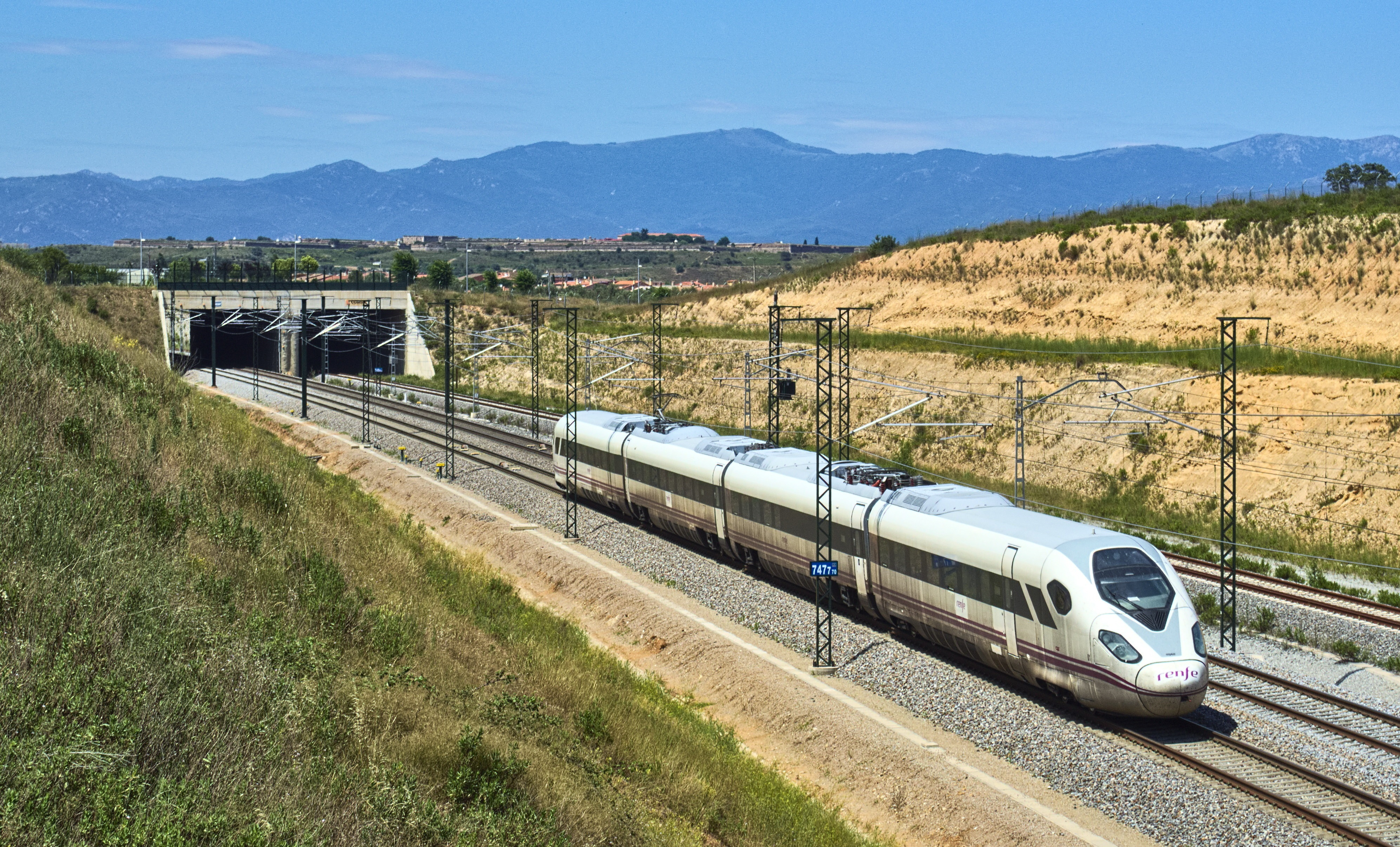
- Manufacturer: CAF
- Constructed: 2010 (Prototype), 2015 (Production model)
- Entered service: 2015
- Operators: Renfe; Flytoget
- Lines served: AVE Network

Specifications
- Car body construction: Aluminium
- Train length: 8-car set, 202.24 m (663 ft 6 in)
- Car length: End car, 26,780 mm (87 ft 10 in) middle cars, 24,780 mm (81 ft 4 in)
- Width: 2,880 mm (9 ft 5 in)
- Height: 4,260 mm (14 ft 0 in)
- Floor height: 1,260 mm (4 ft 2 in)
- Doors: 4 and 8 per car
- Maximum speed: Service: 320 km/h (200 mph); Design: 350 km/h (220 mph)
- Power output: 660 kW (890 hp) per motor, 5,280 kW (7,080 hp) per 4-car set, 7,920 kW (10,620 hp) per 6-car set, 10,560 kW (14,160 hp) per 8-car set
- Power supply: Overhead catenary
- Electric system(s): 25 kV 50 Hz AC, 15 kV 16.7 Hz, 3 kV DC, 1.5 kV DC
- Current collection: Pantograph
- Track gauge: 1,435 mm (4 ft 8 1/2 in) standard gauge, 1,668 mm (5 ft 5 21/32 in) (Iberian gauge), variable gauge

Oaris is a modular high-speed train platform developed by the Spanish manufacturer CAF.

== Technical details ==
Oaris is a non-articulated electric multiple unit with distributed traction, enabling 4-car, 6-car and 8-car configurations. Each car has one powered bogie, with electric motors on both wheelsets, and one unpowered bogie. Power equipment is designed to enable adaptation to all four of the main overhead electrification systems in use across Europe. For the train, running gear with 1,435 mm (4 ft 8 1/2 in) (standard gauge), 1,668 mm (5 ft 5 21/32 in) (Iberian gauge) and variable gauge options has been developed.

Oaris bodyshells are manufactured from aluminium. The driving end cars are 26,780 mm (87 ft 10 in) long, middle cars 24,780 mm (81 ft 4 in), and an 8-car set measures 202.24 m (663 ft 6 in).

The train is fitted with 660 kW (890 hp) motors, giving a total power of 5,280 kW (7,080 hp) in the 4-car, 7,920 kW (10,620 hp) in the 6-car, and 10,560 kW (14,160 hp) in the 8-car configuration. Design speed is 350 km/h (220 mph), the service top speed is 320 km/h (200 mph).

== History ==
- May 2010. After four years of development in a project supported by CDTI, CAF announced the Oaris platform with the unveiling of a full-scale mock-up in May 2010 in the International Rail Forum 2010 at Valencia.
- September 2010. A prototype starts to be assembled by CAF. It has 4 cars and is designed for 216 seats. Renfe has reserved the class 105 for the prototype.
- January 14, 2011. CAF announces that the prototype is finished and will undergo dynamic tests in early 2011.
- December 2011. Four-car prototype undergoes trials at up to 352 km/h on the Madrid to Sevilla route.
- Spring 2013. Prototype gets homologation by Brazilian Rail Industry Association (ABIFER), which will allow CAF to offer trains for the proposed high-speed rail connection between Rio de Janeiro and São Paulo.
- 2013. Test runs for homologation in Spain. In October 2013 company sources said the approval process of Oaris is in the final stages and within months is ready for operation.
- March 2015: The Norwegian airport train operator Flytoget ordered eight 4-car trainsets (maximum speed 250 km/h) to supplement their 16 trains fleet on their Drammen-Oslo-Gardermoen Airport service and will be allowed to run at a maximum speed of 210 km/h on the line, starting from June 2021. They will be known as Class 78.
- June 2019: Belonging to the five train manufacturers selected to tender for High Speed 2 rolling stock CAF presented their Oaris trains as passenger trains for HS2.
- June 2021: The trainsets delivered to Flytoget were withdrawn from service after 19 days of operation due to discovery of cracks in the chassis. In January 2023, the trainsets resumed operation.

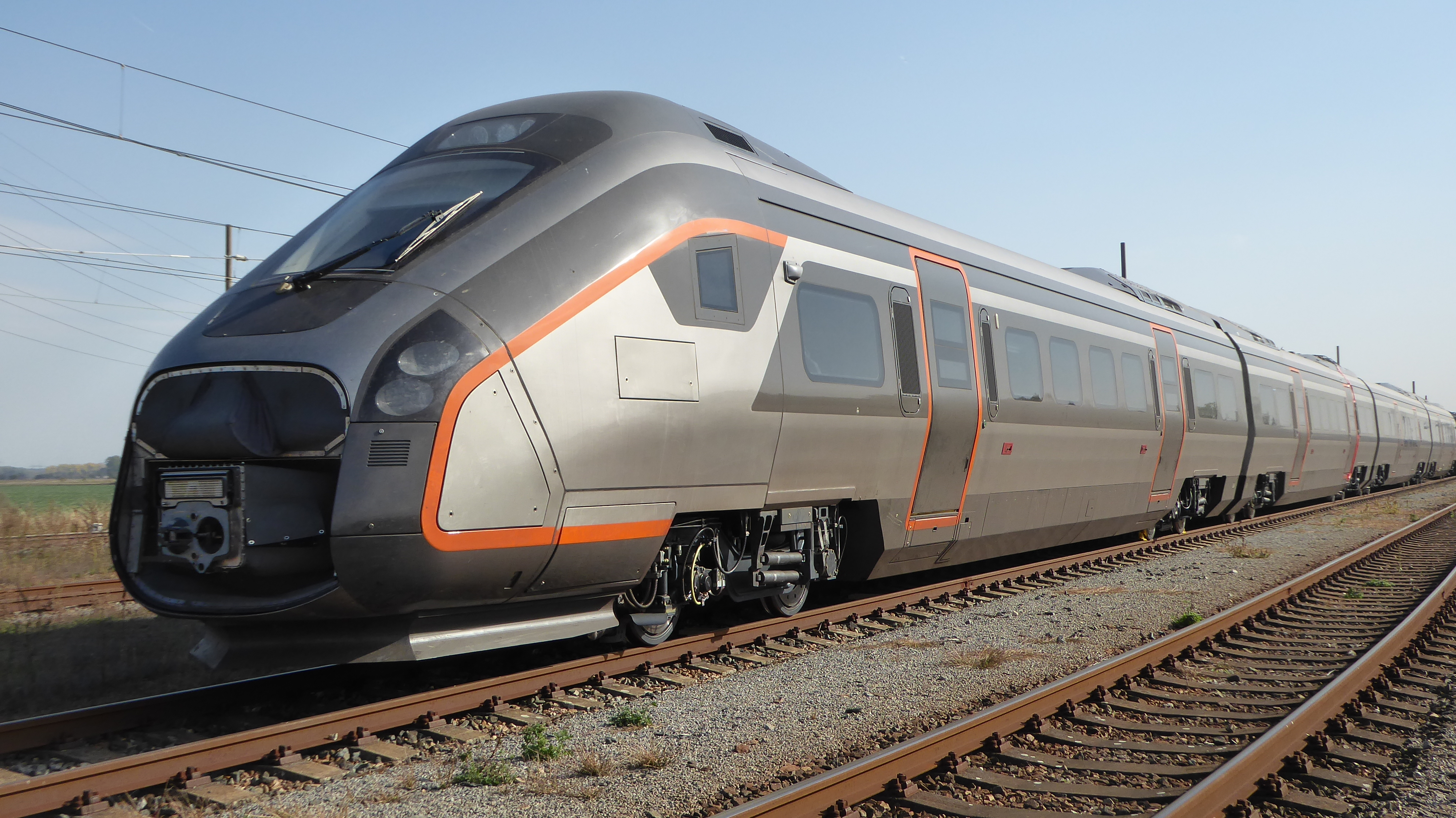
Flytoget CAF Oaris train at the Velim railway test circuit

== See also ==
- Bombardier Zefiro
- Alstom AGV
- Siemens Velaro
- List of high-speed trains
