= Zefiro (train) =

High speed train family

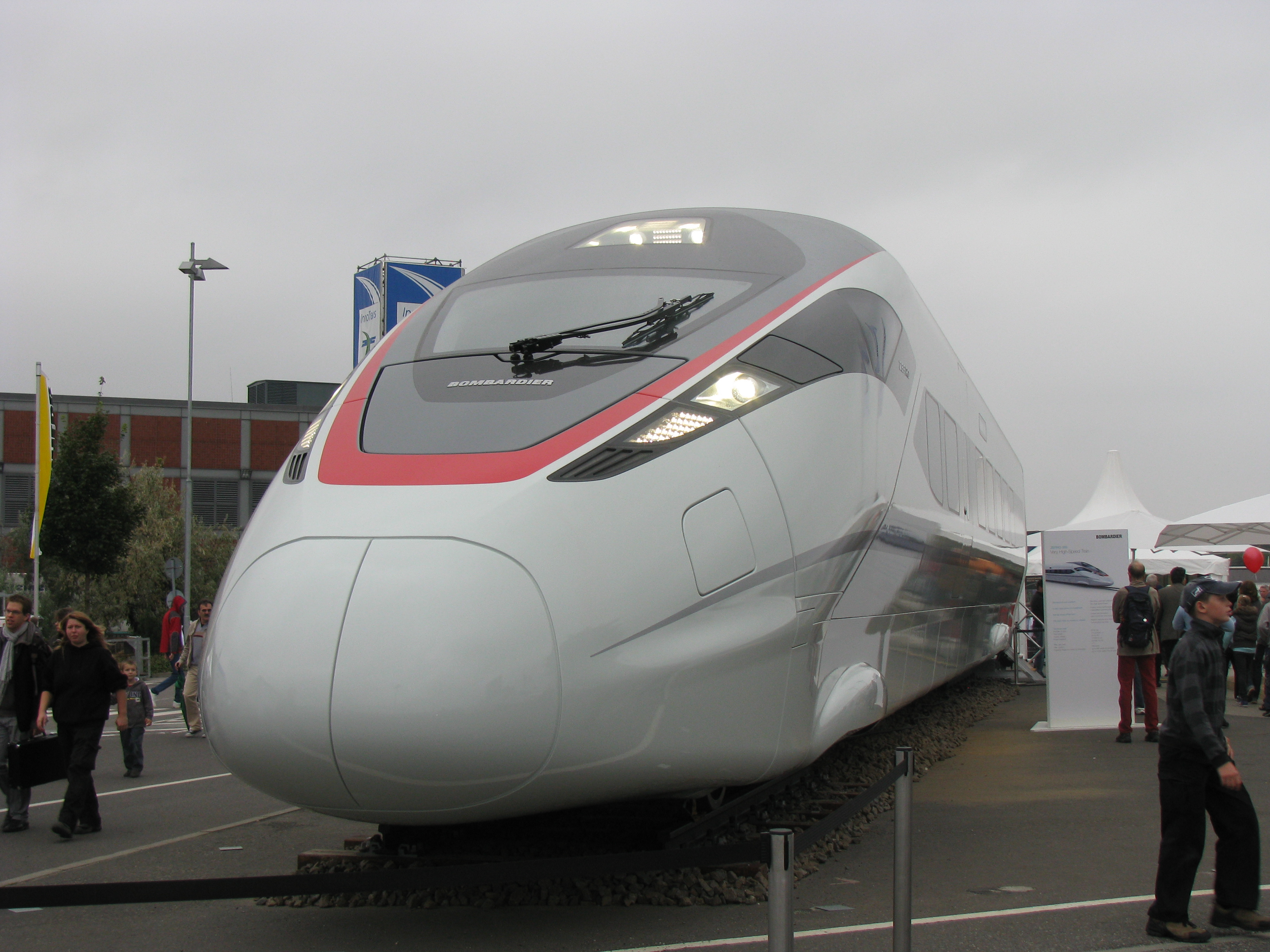
- Alstom Zefiro 380
- Manufacturers: Alstom, AnsaldoBreda, Bombardier, Hitachi Rail
- Constructed: 2009–present

Specifications
- Car length: 26.39 m (86 ft 7 in) (driving car); 24.775 m (81 ft 3.4 in)(intermediate cars)
- Width: 2.9 or 3.4 m (9 ft 6 in or 11 ft 2 in)
- Height: 3.89 m (12 ft 9 in)
- Wheel diameter: 915 mm (36.0 in) (new); 835 mm (32.9 in) (worn)
- Wheelbase: 17.375 m (57 ft 0.1 in) (between bogie centres)
- Maximum speed: 250–400 km/h (155–250 mph)
- Axle load: 16.5 t (16.2 long tons; 18.2 short tons)
- Electric systems: Overhead catenary: 1,500 V DC–3,000 V DC; 15 kV 16.7 Hz AC–25 kV 50 Hz AC
- Current collection: Pantograph
- UIC classification: Bo′Bo′+2′2′+2′2′+Bo′Bo′+Bo′Bo′+2′2′+2′2′+Bo′Bo′ (Zefiro 300 8-car version)
- Braking systems: Electro-dynamic (regenerative) and electro-pneumatic disc
- Track gauge: 1,435 mm (4 ft 8 1/2 in) standard gauge

Zefiro is a family of high-speed passenger trains designed by Bombardier Transportation whose variants have top operating speeds of between 250 km/h (155 mph); 380 km/h (240 mph) and 400 km/h (250 mph).

The family was formerly offered as: the Zefiro 250, which has a top operating speed of 250 km/h (155 mph); the Zefiro V300, which has a top operating speed of 300 km/h (186 mph) and design speed up to 400 km/h (250 mph); and the Zefiro 380, which has a top operating speed of 350 km/h (220 mph) and design speed up to 380 km/h (240 mph).

The name Zefiro was no longer used for marketing shortly after Bombardier Transportation's acquisition by Alstom: as of 2024 the Zefiro 250, 380 and Express are instead referred to as Avelia Stream trains. The Zefiro Express with winter package was renamed to Avelia Stream Nordic.

== Background ==
Bombardier Transportation and its predecessor companies produced a variety of high-speed trainsets, as part collaborations with other conglomerates, such as the Intercity-Express family of locomotives (Germany), AVE Class 102, RENFE class 130 (Spain), ICN (Switzerland), the Acela express (USA), and parts of the TGV Duplex, Eurostar, Thalys, and ETR 500 trainsets (Europe various).

Additionally the company has independently produced high-speed trainsets for specific markets, such as CRH1, "Xinshisu" (China), X 2000, Regina (Sweden) and Class 71 (Norway).

In November 2005 Bombardier launched its general solution, the Zefiro single-deck train for high-speed rail lines, available in 4-, 8-,12- or 16-car sets, capable of being configured for a variety of supply voltages, and produced in either standard (2.9 m or 9 ft 6 in) or a wide (3.4 m or 11 ft 2 in) widths.

In December 2021 Alstom announced plans to transfer the intellectual property and business activities associated with the Zefiro V300 to Hitachi Rail. This was a condition of Alstom's acquisition of Bombardier put in place by the European Commission in order to remain compliant with EU competition law. The transaction was completed on 1 July 2022.

== Design ==
The Zefiro trainset is a conventional (non-inter-coach articulated) single-deck electrical-multiple-unit high-speed train. It consists of powered and unpowered cars, with motorized power cars at either end. Car bodies are constructed of aluminium, with the exception of the wide-bodied Zefiro 250 trains, which have stainless steel bodies. They have customisable open-plan layouts.

Trains are made up of 4-car units, each of which contains a transformer and its own power supply. Typically, the end cars of each 4-car unit have powered bogies, with the two middle cars being unpowered. The pantograph is located on one of the unpowered cars.

The specifications for all current designs (2009) describe asynchronous three-phase motors, with forced air cooling. However, Bombardier also offers the option of permanent-magnet synchronous motors (which it groups in its "ECO4" energy-saving technologies), which were tested on modified Regina trains in 2008 on the "Green Train" (Swedish: Gröna Tåget).

== Variants ==
=== Zefiro 250 ===
Zefiro 250
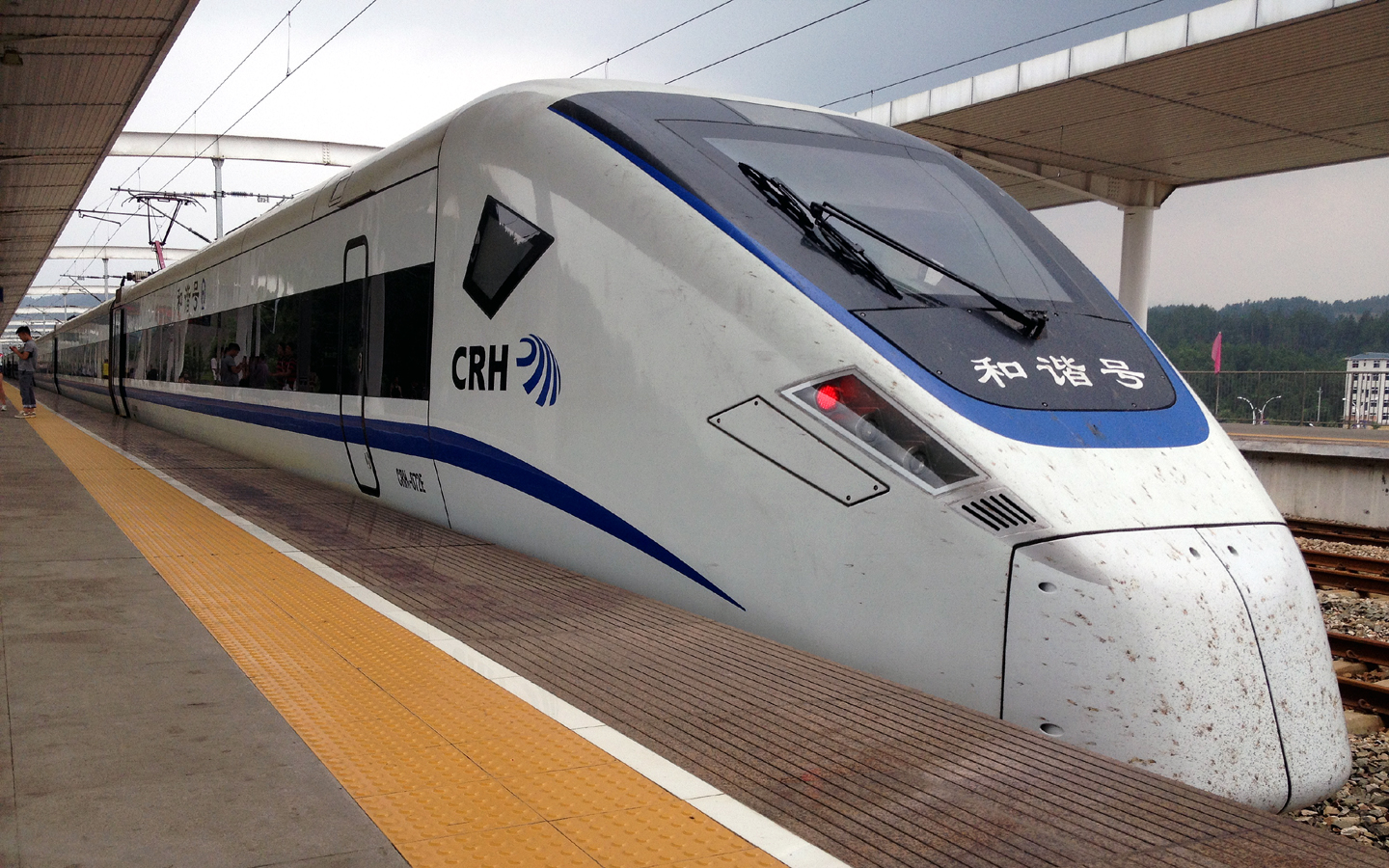
- Constructed: 2009-present
- Formation: 8 or 16 cars (sleeper or seated)
- Capacity: 480 beds, 16 luxury beds, 122 seats (16-car sleeper version)
- Operator: Chinese Ministry of Railways

Specifications
- Car body construction: Stainless steel carbody in wide profile
- Train length: 216 m (708 ft 8 in) (8 cars); 428.9 m (1,407 ft 2 in) (16 cars)
- Car length: 28.25 m (92 ft 8 in) (end cars); 26.6 m (87 ft 3 in) (intermediate cars)
- Width: 3.328 m (10 ft 11.0 in)
- Height: 4.04 m (13 ft 3 in)
- Maximum speed: 250 km/h (155 mph)
- Weight: 890 t (876 long tons; 981 short tons) (16-car trainset)
- Axle load: 16.5 t (16.2 long tons; 18.2 short tons)
- Power output: 13.5 MW (18,104 hp) (for propulsion); 11 MW (14,751 hp) (CRH1E)
- Transmission: AC - DC - AC
- Acceleration: 0.6 m/s^{2} (1.3 mph/s)
- Electric system: 25 kV 50 Hz AC from overhead catenary
- Current collection: Pantograph
- Bogies: Regina type ("FLEXX link") with 2.7 m (8 ft 10 in) wheelbase
- Braking systems: Electro-pneumatic, Regenerative
- Multiple working: Only possible for two 8-car trainsets
- Track gauge: 1,435 mm (4 ft 8 1/2 in) standard gauge

The first variant of the Zefiro concept to be produced was a series of twenty 16-car EMU sleeper trains produced by Bombardier's joint venture Sifang Power (Qingdao) Transportation (BSP), which were delivered from 2009. These trains were the first high-speed train licensed to be manufactured in China as well as the fastest sleeper trains in the world. China Railways designated them as CRH1E.

Starting acceleration is greater than 0.6 m/s^{2} (1.3 mph/s), with a 16-car train weight of 859 t (845 long tons; 947 short tons) and an axle load of 16.5 t (16.2 long tons; 18.2 short tons), bogie type is that found on the Regina with 2.7 m (8 ft 10 in) wheelbase with 63% of axles motorized.

In July 2010, the Ministry of Railways ordered 40 more 8-car 250 km/h (155 mph) CRH1E Zefiro high-speed trains from the Sifang (Qingdao) Transportation Ltd joint venture.

In September 2012, based on a modified contract with Bombardier, the MOR ordered an additional 106 8-car trains, 60 of which are to be a new variant, designated the Zefiro 250NG. This variant is an evolution of the original, and will utilize different materials in order to provide weight savings and more efficient operation.

=== Zefiro V300 ===
Zefiro 300
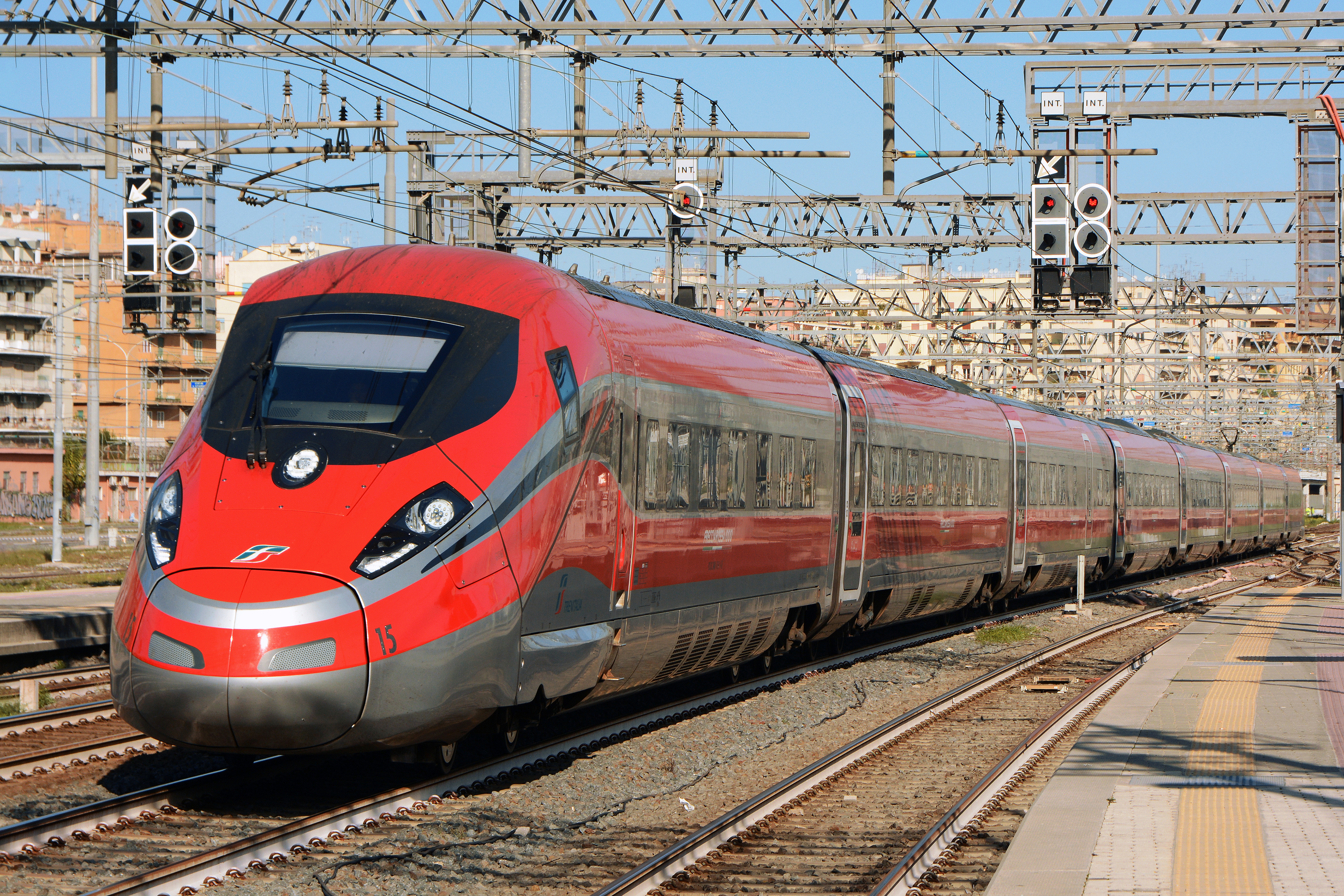
- Formation: up to 16 cars
- Capacity: 600 seats (8 cars); 1,200 seats (16 car)
- Operators: Trenitalia, Iryo

Specifications
- Car body construction: Aluminium
- Train length: 202 m (662 ft 9 in) (8-car train); 402 m (1,318 ft 11 in) (16-car train)
- Width: 2.924 m (9 ft 7.1 in)
- Height: 4.08 m (13 ft 5 in)
- Floor height: 1.24 m (4 ft 1 in)
- Doors: 28 total
- Maximum speed: 400 km/h (250 mph)
- Weight: (empty) 454 t (446.8 long tons; 500.4 short tons)
- Axle load: ~17 t (16.7 long tons; 18.7 short tons).
- Power output: 9.8 MW (13,142 hp) (8-car train @300 km/h (186 mph))
- Acceleration: 0.7 m/s^{2} (1.6 mph/s)
- Deceleration: 1.2 m/s^{2} (2.7 mph/s)
- Electric systems: Overhead catenary: 1,500 V DC–3 kV DC; 15 kV 16.7 Hz AC–25 kV 50 Hz AC
- Current collection: Pantograph
- Bogies: "FLEXX speed", 2.85 m (9 ft 4 in) wheelbase
- Braking systems: Regenerative, Friction
- Multiple working: Only possible for two 8-car trainsets
- Track gauge: 1,435 mm (4 ft 8 1/2 in)

The Zefiro V300 is intended for European operations, with a UIC profile, and capable of being fitted for use on all four European electrification schemes (1.5 & 3 kV DC, 15 & 25 kV AC). Bogies are FLEXX type with a 2.85 m (9 ft 4 in) wheelbase, 50% of which are motorized. Starting acceleration is greater than 0.60 m/s^{2} (1.3 mph/s). It has an axle load of approximately 17 t (16.7 long tons; 18.7 short tons). Two 8-car sets can be joined together to form one longer train.

A variant of the Zefiro V300 was offered by Bombardier in association with AnsaldoBreda to Trenitalia, the Italian national railway service, as part of a bid for 50 new high-speed trainsets in 2010. Trenitalia selected this bid as the winner on 5 August 2010. These entered service in 2015 and are designated Frecciarossa 1000.

An evolution of the Zefiro V300 platform was also offered by a joint venture between Bombardier (later Alstom) and Hitachi Rail for the HS2 rolling stock tender for its first phase, for which it was awarded the contract for 54 trainsets and will be classified as the Class 895.

=== Zefiro 380 ===
Zefiro 380
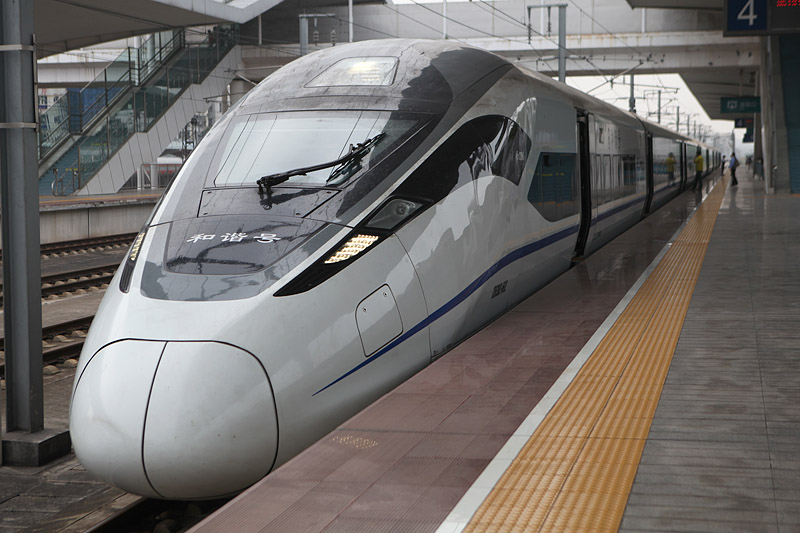
- Entered service: 2012
- Formation: 8 or 16 cars
- Capacity: 664 seats (max) 8 car 1,336 seats (max) 16 car
- Operator: China Railway Corporation

Specifications
- Car body construction: Aluminium carbody, wide profile
- Train length: 215.3 m (706 ft 4 in) (8 car); 428.1 m (1,404 ft 6 in) (16 car)
- Car length: 27.85 m (91 ft 4 in) (Cab car); 26.6 m (87 ft 3 in) (Intermediate car)
- Width: 3.4 m (11 ft 2 in)
- Height: 4.16 m (13 ft 8 in)
- Maximum speed: 380 km/h (236 mph)
- Weight: 462 t (455 long tons; 509 short tons) (Empty); 1,088 t (1,071 long tons; 1,199 short tons) (Full axle load)
- Power output: 20 MW (26,820 hp)(16-car @380 km/h (236 mph)); 10 MW (13,410 hp)(8-car @380 km/h (236 mph))
- Transmission: AC - DC - AC
- Acceleration: 0.48 m/s^{2} (1.1 mph/s)
- Electric system: 25 kV 50 Hz AC from overhead catenary
- Current collection: Pantograph
- UIC classification: Bo′Bo′+2′2′+Bo′Bo′+2′2′+2′2′+Bo′Bo′+2′2′+Bo′Bo′ (8 car set); Bo′Bo′+2′2′+Bo′Bo′+2′2′+2′2′+Bo′Bo′+2′2′+Bo′Bo′+Bo′Bo′+2′2′+Bo′Bo′+2′2′+2′2′+Bo′Bo′+2′2′+Bo′Bo′ (16 car set)
- Bogies: "FLEXX speed" with 2.7 m (8 ft 10 in) wheelbase
- Braking systems: Regenerative and pneumatic
- Multiple working: Only possible for two 8-car trainsets
- Track gauge: 1,435 mm (4 ft 8 1/2 in) standard gauge

In September 2009, Bombardier announced an order for eighty Zefiro 380 high-speed trains by the Chinese Ministry of Railways (MOR) to be produced at Bombardier's joint venture Sifang (Qingdao) Transportation Ltd. The order of twenty 8-car sets and sixty 16-car sets was estimated to be worth 27.4 billion RMB (approx €2.7 billion or $4 billion). The value of Bombardier's share is estimated at €1.3 billion.

Under China Railways' use these trains have been designated CRH1C (8-car set) and CRH1D (16-car set). which was in December 2010 revised to CRH380C and CRH380CL and once again to CRH380D (8-car set) & CRH380DL (16-car set) according to the new numbering system.

In September 2012, the order has been amended to include only seventy 8-car sets, designated as the CRH380D and additional 46 Zefiro 250 and 60 Zefiro 250NG.

All the 85 trainsets have been delivered and are currently operated by Shanghai Railway Bureau & Chengdu Railway Bureau.

=== Zefiro Express ===
==== Västtrafik X80 ====
In 2018, Swedish regional transport authority Västtrafik ordered 40 new trains (originally designated during tendering as EMU200, now designated as X80) in 2018, of a new model capable of 200 km/h (125 mph), though upgradeable to 250 km/h (155 mph). They have three cars and are around 80 metres (262 ft 6 in) long. First delivery was planned at end of 2021, but the coronavirus pandemic delayed the production and test runs of the new trains. 5 additional trains were ordered from the options in November 2018, and 35 more trains were ordered in November 2025, now part of the Avelia Stream Nordic family of trains.

Västtrafik then expected that the first train set will arrive in Västerås in April 2022, and that another four train sets will be delivered to Sweden during the spring. The first vehicles were due to be operating in the traffic in spring 2024 The trains are designed for the colder weather conditions under which the fleet will operate, including temperatures as low as -40 degrees Celsius and snow drifts up to 80 cm deep.

They are equipped with a winter package including an uprated propulsion system, a single-axle drive and enhanced slip-slide regulation. The bodyshells were manufactured by Bombardier Sifang (Qingdao) Transportation Ltd in China with final fit-out of all other components performed at the Hennigsdorf works in Germany. The trains have been thoroughly temperature tested already, and were to be tested further in Sweden during winter 2022.

In 2023, it was reported that the delivery would be delayed to 2025, due to adjustments needed to indoor climate control following intensive winter tests. In late 2025, entry into service was further delayed by at least six months due to software issues, pushing their planned entry into service to April 2026. The train entered service on 11 May 2026. Deliveries of the 80 X80s are expected to continue until 2030.

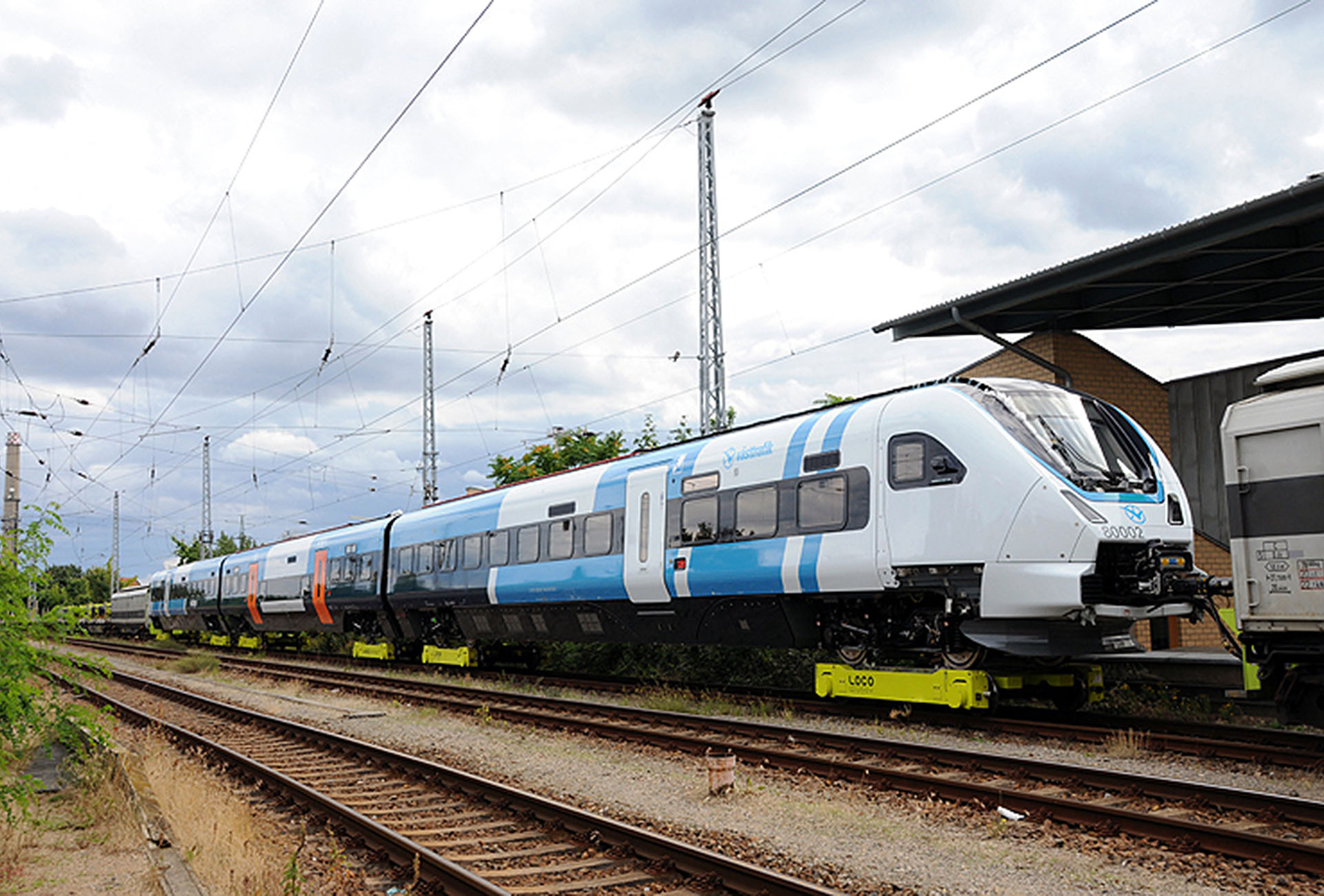
Västtrafik X80

==== SJ 250/X250 (Delta 2.0) ====
In 2021, the Swedish train operator SJ decided to buy 25 new Bombardier/Alstom Zefiro trains, expected to come into service in 2026. The top speed is 250 km/h (155 mph).

The trains will have 363 seats, and designed to handle running at temperatures of -40 degrees Celsius. Train systems are designed to operate in both Sweden and Denmark, as well being certified to operate in Norway.

== See also ==
- China Railway CRH1 - Class designation of China railways high-speed trains of Bombardier design
- Siemens Velaro - competitor of similar design.
- Alstom AGV - competitor of similar design.
- Alstom New Pendolino - competitor of similar design
- List of high-speed trains
