= Talgo 230 =

Family of passenger trains

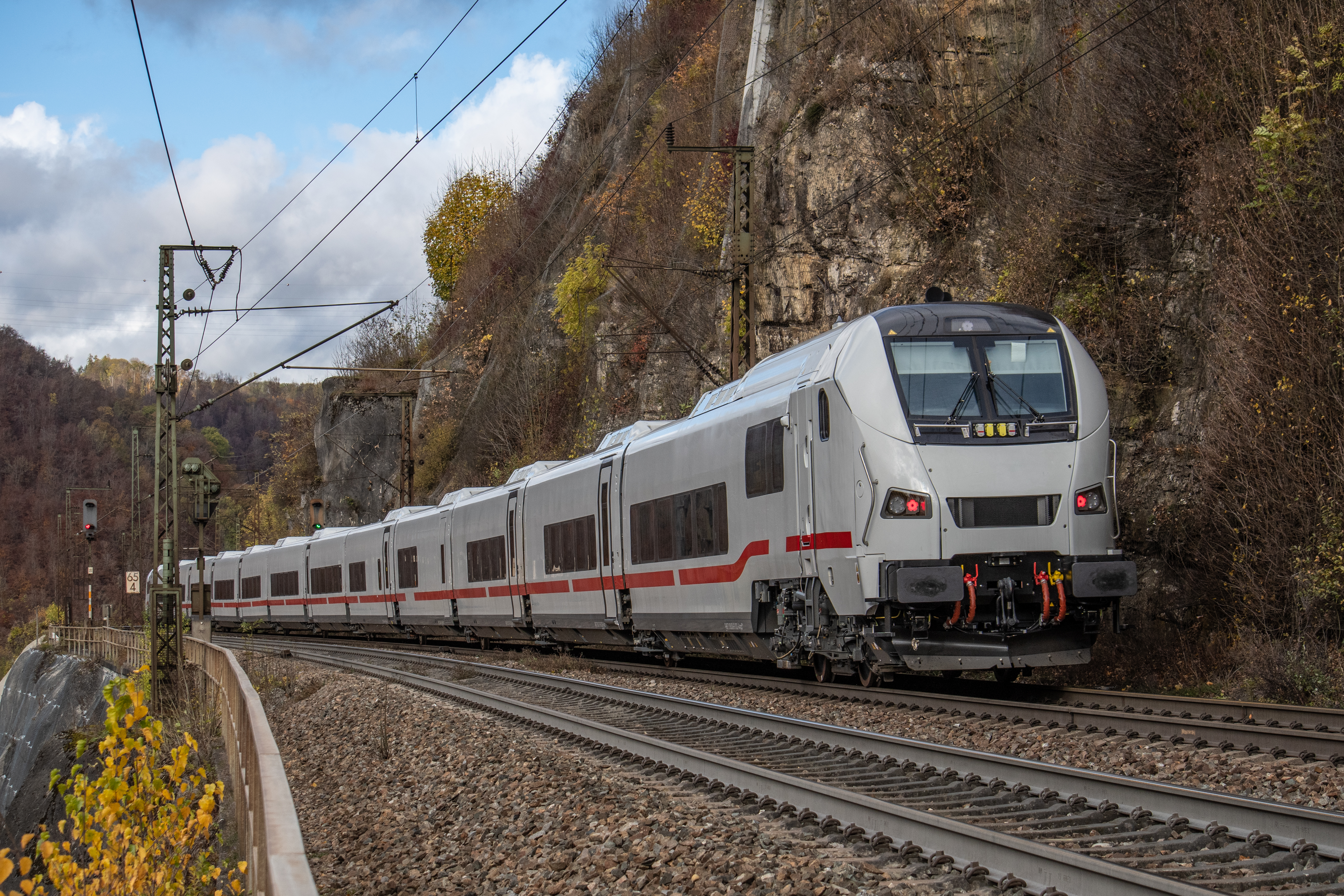
DB ICE L on a test drive in 2023

Talgo 230 is a family of passenger trains built by Spanish company Talgo. The trains are single-level fixed-configuration articulated train sets capable of operation up to 230 kilometres per hour (140 mph) and are hauled by a separate locomotive. As of June 2026, orders had been placed for:

- ICE L for Germany's Deutsche Bahn (DB), originally 79 train sets; later reduced to 60 train sets
- DSB EC for Danish State Railways (DSB), 16 train sets
- FlixTrain, 65 train sets
- Swedish Transport Administration (Trafikverket) long-distance fleet, 20 train sets
- Egyptian National Railways, 6 inter-city and 7 night train sets

The train sets are commonly used with Siemens Vectron locomotives; or Talgo's own DB Class 105 locomotives.
