= Rhaetian Railway Be 4/4 =

Swiss metre-gauge railcar class

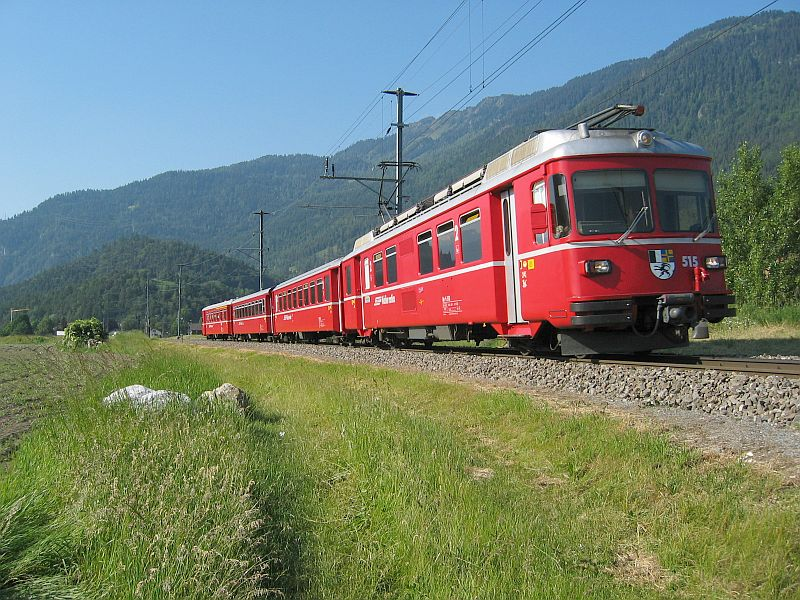
- Be 4/4 no 515 at Rhäzüns
- Manufacturer: FFA, SIG, and SAAS
- Constructed: 1971, 1979
- Number built: 6
- Number in service: 6
- Fleet numbers: 511–516
- Operators: Rhaetian Railway

Specifications
- Car length: 18,700 mm (61 ft 4 1/4 in)
- Maximum speed: 90 km/h (56 mph)
- Weight: 44.6 tonnes (43.9 long tons; 49.2 short tons)
- Power output: 784 kW (1,050 hp)
- Electric system(s): 11 kV 16.7 Hz AC Overhead
- Current collection: Pantograph
- UIC classification: Bo′Bo′
- Track gauge: 1,000 mm (3 ft 3 3/8 in) metre gauge

The Rhaetian Railway Be 4/4 is a class of 11 kV 16.7 Hz AC metre gauge railcars operating under the traffic numbers 511–516 on the so-called core network of the Rhaetian Railway (RhB), which is the main railway network in the Canton of Graubünden, Switzerland.

The class is named under the Swiss locomotive and railcar classification system. According to that system, Be 4/4 denotes an electric railcar with second class compartments, and a total of four axles, all of which are drive axles.

The Be 4/4 vehicles normally operate as part of a three or four car train, in combination with one or two intermediate cars (B) and a driving car (ABt).

== History ==
In the 1960s, the Rhaetian Railway was exposed to steadily rising passenger numbers and therefore increasing demands on its rolling stock. In particular, passenger expectations of rolling stock had altered.

These changes led the Rhaetian Railway to carry out detailed studies as to what new rolling stock should be acquired. The studies revealed, amongst other things, that there was a need for a contemporary vehicle concept to serve commuter traffic around Chur. The Rhaetian Railway therefore decided, at the end of October 1968, to order four modern three car commuter trains. These could be used not only for Chur's commuter traffic, but also for special sports trains.

In 1971, the three manufacturers of the power cars, FFA (railcar bodies), SIG (bogies), and SAAS (electrical equipment), delivered the first four power cars (numbers 511–514) to the Rhaetian Railway. These vehicles were Switzerland's first series production units with continuous electronic power control (phase control thyristors). Simultaneously, the Rhaetian Railway placed the matching intermediate cars (B 2411–2414) and driving cars (ABDt 1711–1714) into service, so that four three car commuter trains could be formed.

In contrast with the rest of the Rhaetian Railway's rolling stock, the Be 4/4 commuter trains are fitted with automatic couplings and air brakes; mixed use of the vehicles with other rolling stock is therefore not possible. In 1979, the Rhaetian Railway acquired two practically identical three car trains with traffic numbers ending in 15 and 16. After four additional intermediate cars (B 2417–2420) joined the fleet in 1988, four car trains could also be operated.

From 1994, the vehicles went through an extensive refit program, during which the electrical equipment was completely renewed, apart from the traction motors.

== Technical details ==
The Be 4/4 vehicles were designed to be of welded steel construction. This had to be regarded as a new construction, which is why car body loading tests were carried out with appropriate measurements. The matching unpowered cars, by contrast, have fully welded lightweight car bodies.

The entire train composition from was designed the beginning to be operated by one man. Therefore, all doors are equipped with a pneumatic door locking feature that can be operated from the cab (side selective door release). The doors have push button pre-selection keys adjacent to them. They also have a door closure system that closes the doors automatically when the vehicle starts moving, and keeps them closed while driving.

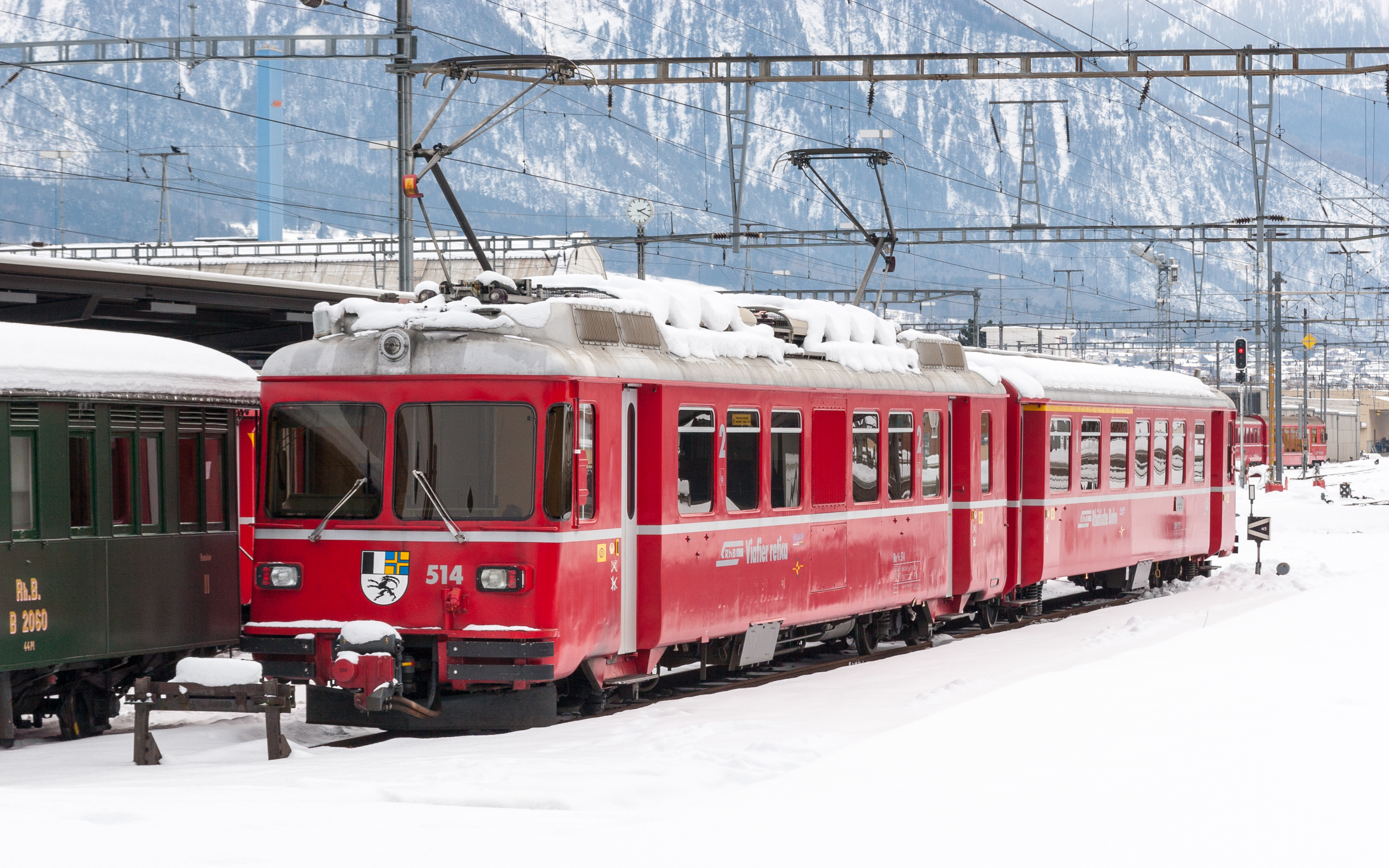
RhB Be 4/4 in Landquart (2010)

In the interior, attention was given to ensuring that enough hand rails were available for the standing passengers expected in normal service. The bogies are fitted with side steerers and are unpivoted. All axles are equipped with disc brakes. The traction motors are horizontally opposed, and outfitted with custom gears. This arrangement — although expensive — has advantages in minimising vibration of the bogie. The vehicle has two two-axle bogies, with individually driven axles, and is therefore classified as Bo′Bo′.

The built-in multiple unit train control is designed to operate up to three units. To ensure a quick connection and disconnection, the vehicles are fitted with a +GF+ brand device, which, in addition to the mechanical connectors, simultaneously couples the electrical and pneumatic lines.

The vehicles can accelerate at a rate of 0.8 metres per second squared (2.6 ft/s^{2}). Their permissible maximum speed is 90 kilometres per hour (56 mph). The electric brake can slow the vehicles at a similar rate of 0.8 m/s², down to 20 kilometres per hour (12 mph). At that point, the vehicle switches automatically to the electropneumatic brake, to compensate for the declining electric braking performance. The electric brake is also designed for continuous loading, which occurs in applications such as persistent braking of a fully loaded train on a 4.5 ‰ slope (e.g. Davos – Küblis). The vehicles' output per hour is 780 kilowatts (1,050 hp) at 45 kilometres per hour (28 mph).

== Operation ==
The Be 4/4 themselves have seating for 40 second class passengers. Whole trains, including an intermediate car (B) and a driving car (ABt), have a total of 12 first class seats, 136 second class seats, and also 22 fold down seats. The main application served by these Vorortspendel trains was and is regional traffic in the environs of Chur. Operations on the Davos – Filisur line and in the Engadin have been for only short episodes.

== List of vehicles ==
Be 4/4 railcars are numbered 511 - 516 and are in use with B 2411-2420, ABDt 1711-1716 forming the so-called Stammnetzpendelzüge.

== Sources, further reading ==
=== Literature ===
- Daniel Brunner und Leo Fäh: Refit-Aktion bei den Thyristor-Pendelzügen der Rhätischen Bahn. In: Schweizer Eisenbahn-Revue 5/1996.
- Hans-Bernhard Schönborn: Schweizer Triebfahrzeuge, 2004, GeraMond, ISBN 3-7654-7176-3
- Franz Skvor: 25 Jahre Thyristor-Pendelzüge der Rhätischen Bahn. In: Schweizer Eisenbahn-Revue 5/1996.
- W. Wegmann: Die Nahverkers-Pendelzüge der Rhätischen Bahn (RhB) In: Eisenbahn Amateur 2/1975 Seite 53-57
