= DB Class 105 =

Class of German Railway Locomotive

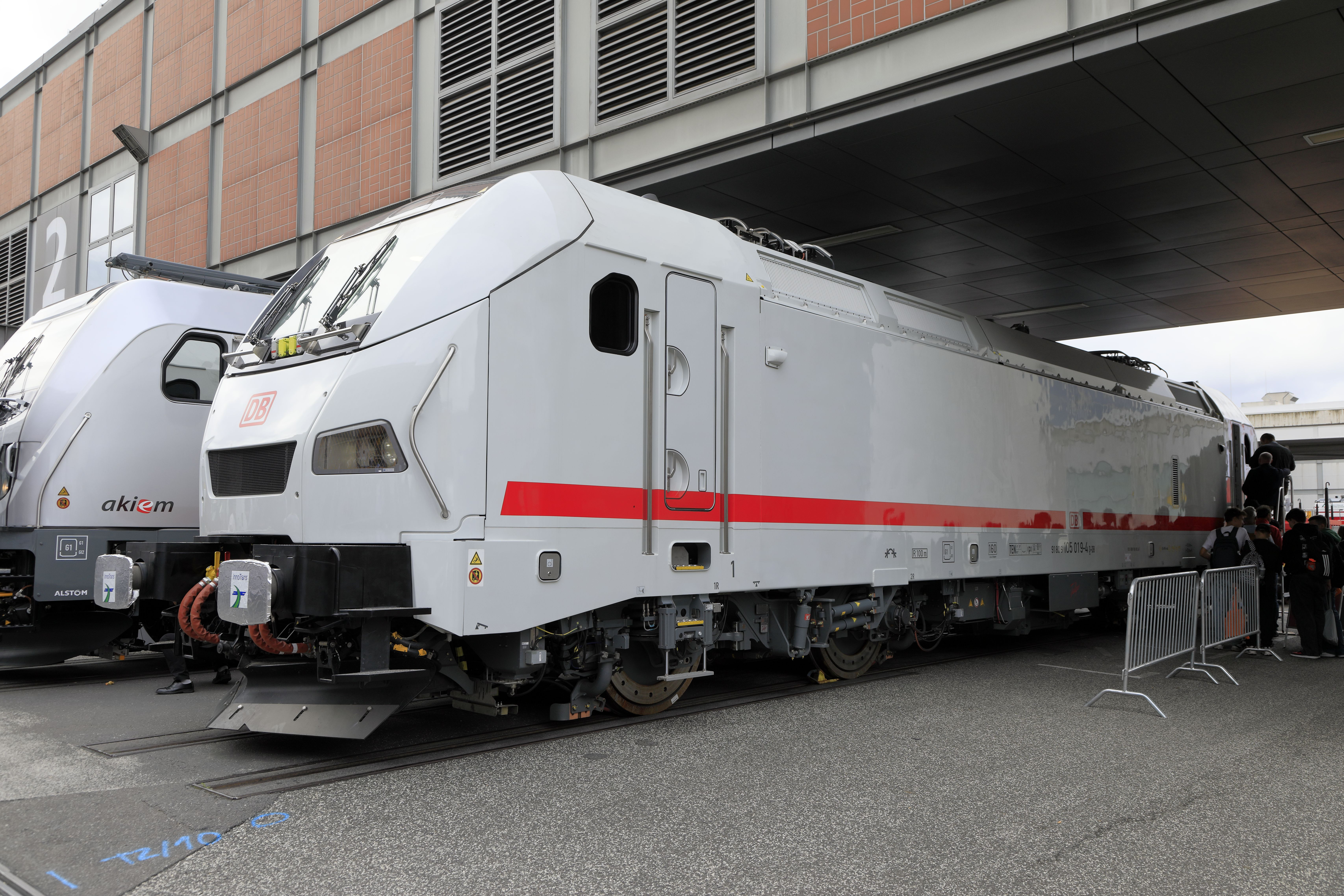
Type and origin
- Builder: Talgo
- Build date: from 2021
- Total produced: 79 (ordered)
Specifications
- Configuration
  - UIC: Bo’Bo’
- Gauge: 1435
- Minimum curve: 100 m
- Length
  - Over beams: 19,7 m
- Height: 4,2 m
- Axle load: 22 t
- Service weight: 88 t
- Electric system/s: 15 kV, 16,7 Hz AC, 25 kV, 50 Hz AC, 1,5 kV DC
- Current pickup: Pantograph
- MU working: ÖBB-Fernsteuerkonzept
- Loco brake: Regenerative Dynamic Braking, Disc Brakes
- Safety systems: PZB90, LZB, ATB and ETCS Baseline 3
- Couplers: Buffers and chain coupler
Performance figures
- Maximum speed: 230 km/h (200 km/h with 1,5 DC )
- Power output
  - 1 hour: 6.400 kW (4000 kW with 1,5 DC )
- Tractive effort
  - Starting: 300 kN

The DB Class 105 is a class of multi-system electric locomotives, which has been ordered by DB Fernverkehr from the Spanish rolling stock manufacturer Talgo to haul the ICE L.

== History ==
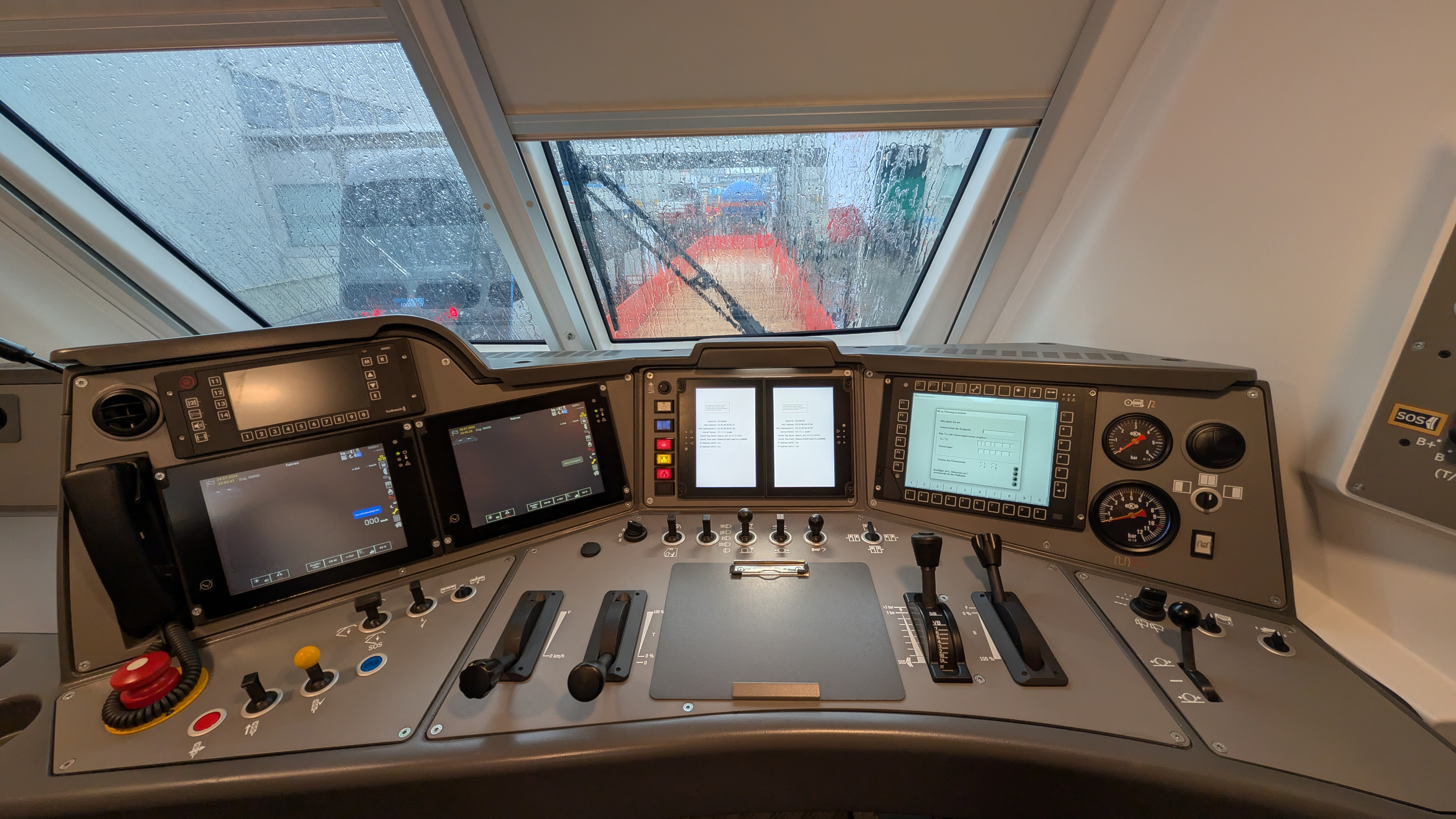
Driver's Cab

A public tender was held by DB Fernverkehr for the procurement of up to 100 new locomotive-hauled long-distance trains from March 2017 to February 2018. After awarding Talgo the contract, 79 trains were ordered by DB under the Framework agreement. The first locomotive, number 6105 019, was transported from the Talgo plant in Rivabellosa to Germany in July 2023 and subsequently to Vienna for testing in a specialized climate controlled wind tunnel.

== Planned Deployments ==
The Class 105 is intended as the primary locomotive for the ICE L in long-distance service.

== Literature ==
- "Lauftechnische Messungen an der Talgo-Lokomotive für DB Fernverkehr", Eisenbahn-Revue International, no. 5, Luzern: Minirex, p. 223, ISSN 1421-2811
