= ICE 4 =

German high speed train model

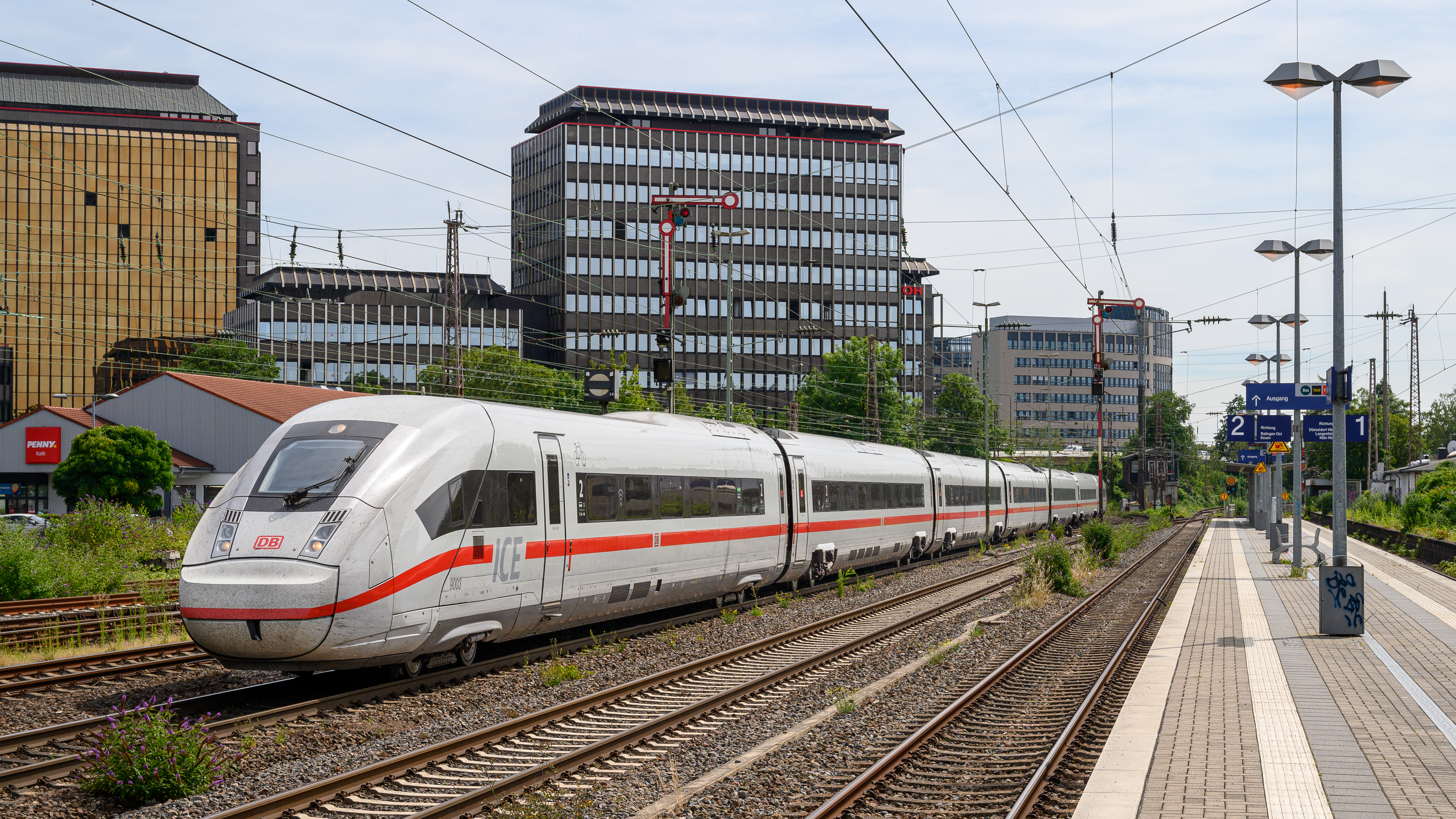
- ICE 4 trainset

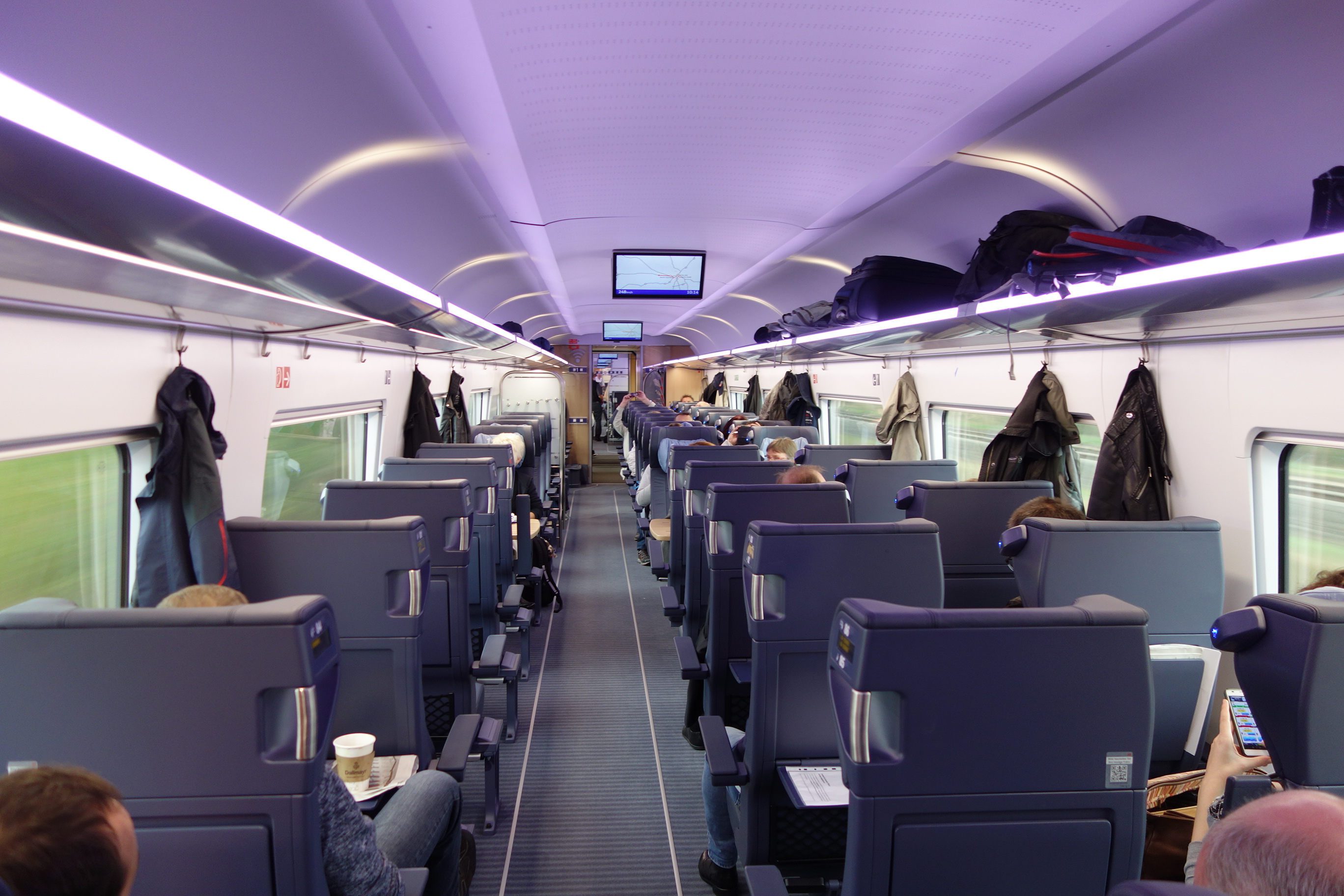
- First class interior
- Manufacturers: Siemens Mobility; Bombardier/Alstom (subcontractor)
- Built at: Wrocław (body shells); Graz (bogies); Krefeld (electronics); Hennigsdorf (cabs)
- Replaced: Intercity
- Constructed: 2015-2024
- Entered service: 10 December 2017
- Number built: 137: 7-cars (Class 412.2): 37; 12-cars (Class 412.0): 50; 13-cars (Class 412.4): 50
- Formation: K1n/K1s: 7 cars (3M4T); K3s: 12 cars (6M6T); K4s: 13 cars (7M6T)
- Capacity: 444 (K1n/K1s); 724 (K3s, 10-car); 830 (K3s, 12-car); 918 (K4s, 13-car)
- Operator: DB Fernverkehr

Specifications
- Train length: 202 m (662 ft 8 3/4 in) (7-car sets); 346 m (1,135 ft 2 in) (12-car sets); 374 m (1,227 ft 3/8 in) (13-car sets)
- Car length: Driving car: 29.106 m (95 ft 5 7/8 in); Intermediate car: 28.75 m (94 ft 3 7/8 in)
- Width: 2,642 to 2,852 mm (8 ft 8 in to 9 ft 4 1/4 in) (internal/external)
- Height: 4,111 mm (13 ft 5 7/8 in)
- Platform height: 550 to 760 mm (21.7 to 29.9 in) ARL
- Wheel diameter: Driving wheel: 920 / 840 mm (3 ft 1/4 in / 2 ft 9 1/8 in) (new/worn); Carrying wheel: 825 / 750 mm (2 ft 8 1/2 in / 2 ft 5 1/2 in) (new/worn)
- Maximum speed: K3s/K4s: 265 km/h (165 mph); K1s: 250 km/h (155 mph)
- Weight: K1n: 470 t (463 long tons; 518 short tons); K3s: 820 t (807 long tons; 904 short tons); K4s: 890 t (876 long tons; 981 short tons)
- Traction system: Siemens E950 D1440/650 M5 refag IGBT–C/I
- Traction motors: Siemens 420 kW (560 hp) 3-phase AC induction motor
- Power output: K1n/K1s: 4,950 kW (6,638 hp); K3s: 8,250 kW (11,063 hp); K3s (12-car): 9,900 kW (13,276 hp); K4s (13-car): 11,550 kW (15,489 hp)
- Acceleration: K1n: 0.55 m/s^{2} (1.23 mph/s); K3s: 0.53 m/s^{2} (1.19 mph/s)
- Electric system: 15 kV 16 2/3 Hz AC (nominal) from overhead catenary
- Current collection: Pantograph
- UIC classification: K1n:: 2′2′+Bo′Bo′+2′2′+Bo′Bo′+Bo′Bo′+2′2′+2′2′; K3s: 2′2′+Bo′Bo′+Bo′Bo′+2′2′+Bo′Bo′+Bo′Bo′+2′2′+Bo′Bo′+2′2′+Bo′Bo′+2′2′+2′2′; K4s: 2′2′+Bo′Bo′+Bo′Bo′+2′2′+Bo′Bo′+Bo′Bo′+Bo′Bo′+2′2′+Bo′Bo′+2′2′+Bo′Bo′+2′2′+2′2′
- Safety systems: ETCS, LZB, PZB
- Coupling system: Scharfenberg Type 10
- Track gauge: 1,435 mm (4 ft 8 1/2 in) standard gauge

Notes/references
- Sources: Specifications (except where noted)

ICE 4 is a brand name for long-distance Intercity-Express high-speed trains being procured for Deutsche Bahn.

Procurement started around 2008 for replacements for locomotive-hauled InterCity and EuroCity train services, and was later expanded to include replacements for ICE 1 and ICE 2 high-speed trainsets. In 2011 Siemens Mobility was awarded the contract for 130 seven-car intercity train replacements, and 90 ten-car ICE train replacements, plus further options – the contract for the ten-car sets was modified in 2013 to expand the trainset length to twelve vehicles. The name ICx was used for the trains during the initial stages of the procurement; in late 2015 the trains were rebranded 'ICE 4', at the unveiling of the first train set, and given the class designation 412 by Deutsche Bahn.

Two pre-production trainsets had been manufactured by 2016, and were used for testing later that year, prior to the introduction of the main series in late 2017.

== History ==
=== Contract and manufacture ===
Around 2008 Deutsche Bahn began the tendering process to replace locomotive/coach trainsets on its long distance subsidiary, DB Fernverkehr's, InterCity and EuroCity train services. The initial announcement suggested that the tender would be for 100 to 130 trainsets. No specific train type was specified and DB did not intend to become involved with the design process - both locomotive-hauled trains such as Railjet or variations on the ICE 3 EMU design were considered to be options. The new trains were to be branded ICX and were expected to be similar in aesthetic design to the ICE3 trains; the design speed was expected to be in the 200 to 250 km/h (125 to 155 mph) range and to improve upon the energy efficiency of the units it replaced.

The scope of the procurement was later expanded to include replacements for the ICE 1 and ICE 2 trains with a top speed of up to 280 km/h (175 mph), and the size of the order increased to up to 300 trains. Bids were received from Alstom and Siemens, with the Siemens bid including Bombardier Transportation as a subcontractor. Initial bids made in 2009 were said to be too high by DB, being over €5 billion. In 2010, DB announced that Siemens had been chosen as the preferred bidder for the procurement scheme, and on 9 May 2011 DB and Siemens signed a contract for 130 ICx trains, plus a further 90 trainsets to be formalised at a later date, with an option for a further 80 sets. The trains were to be delivered by 2030, with the value of the 220 train deal estimated at around €6 billion. Siemens' share of the contract for the intercity sets was later reported as being worth €3.7 billion to the company, reported to be the "biggest order in the company's history".

In 2011 Siemens awarded Bombardier Transportation a subcontract for its contribution to the project valued at €2.2 billion, of which €1.3 billion was for the 130 'intercity' trains. Bombardier's contract included aerodynamic optimisation of the design, and supply of the bodyshells - initially expected to come from its Görlitz plant, with driving vehicle assembly to take place at its Hennigsdorf plant, and Flexx Eco bogies manufactured at its plant in Siegen. The change in the initial order from 10 to 12 car ICE replacement trains (170 additional vehicles) resulted in a €336 million increase in the value of Bombardier's order.

Bodyshells are also to be supplied from Bombardier's Wrocław plant (Poland). In 2015 Bombardier contracted Panattoni Europe to build an additional 18,357 m^{2} (197,590 sq ft) manufacturing hall for the Wrocław plant, initially to be used for the construction of the ICx trains.

Faiveley was awarded (late 2011/early 2012) contracts to supply brake equipment, including magnetic track brakes, and electropneumatic brake systems; as well as doors and air conditioning systems for the 130 unit intercity order.

Voith was contracted to supply parts of the nose of the trainsets, including GFRP cabin, the nose module and its opening hatches, coupling systems, and snow deflector.

Construction of the trainsets was expected to start in 2013, with two pre-production trains delivered by 2016. With Alstom taking over Bombardier's rail business in January 2021, Bombardier's manufacturing responsibility of remaining sets on order were transferred to Alstom.

=== Design ===
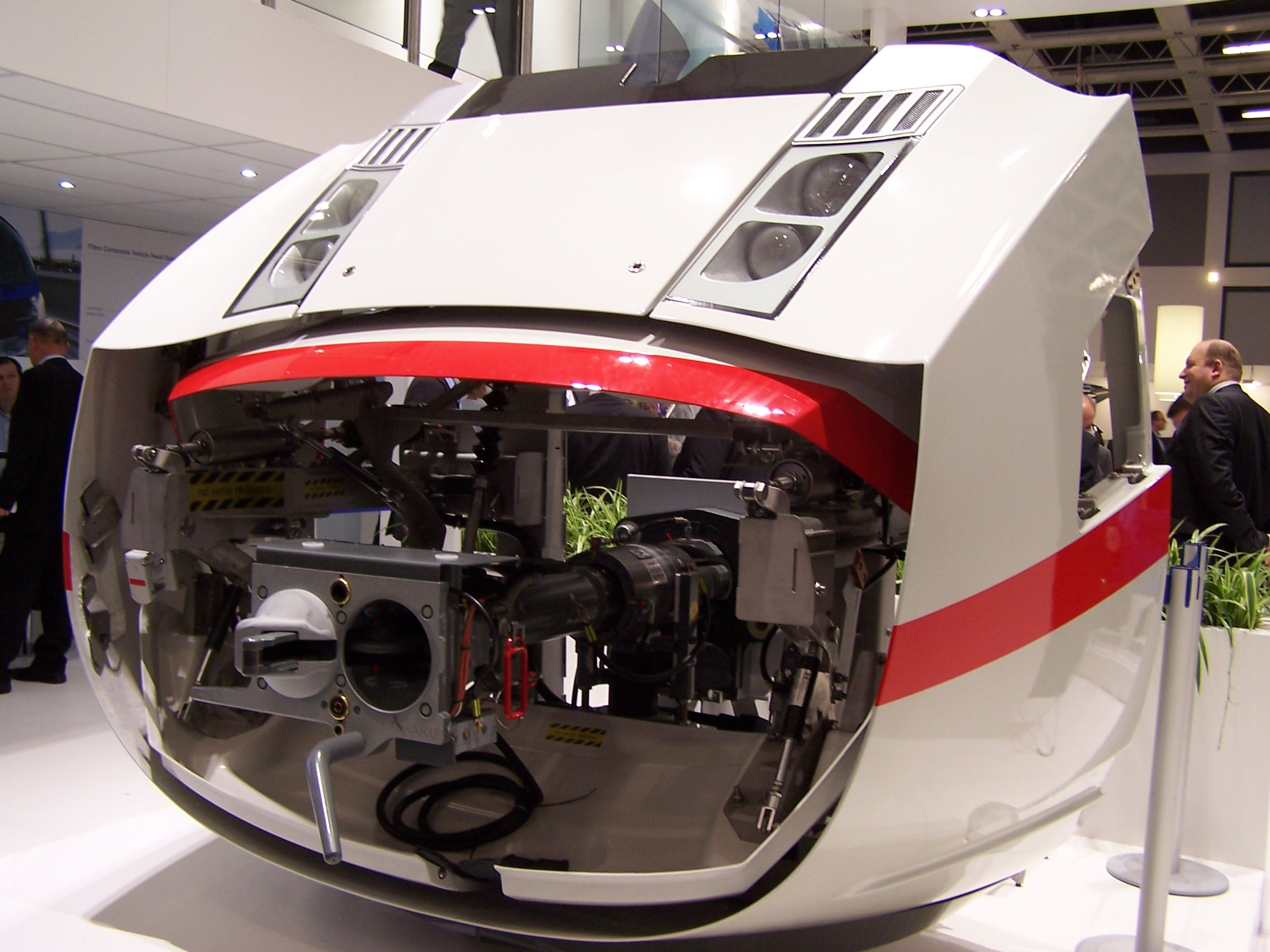
Voith ICx front end 'mockup', InnoTrans 2014

The initial contract with Siemens, signed 2011 specified a design allowing flexible train make-up (between 5 and 14 units), with 24 different variants described; each composed of motor cars, and trailer cars. Two main variants were: a seven car, 499 seat trainset with 3 motor cars (K1n) and a top speed of 230 km/h (145 mph) - these were to replace locomotive hauled trains; the second was a ten car, 724 seat variant with 5 power cars (K3s) and a top speed of 250 km/h (155 mph), to replace ICE1 and ICE2 trains - the replacements were expected to be 20 tonnes lighter than the trains they replaced, resulting in claimed energy savings of 30%

Each trainset was to have a restaurant/bistro car, cycle storage, and a designated 'family area'.

The exterior design received a Red Dot design award in 2015.

The K3 trains are to be for Germany, Austria and Switzerland, 12 of the K1 trains are to be operated into the Netherlands.

On 5 March 2013, DB announced that it had approved a 12 car 250 km/h (155 mph) train configuration that would raise capacity over, and replace in the base order, the existing 10 car train - seating capacity would increase from 724 seats to 830 seats. The order was altered in expectation of growing ridership for DB's long-distance services. In 2020, DB announced a further order of a 13-car configuration, with increased passenger capacity and a higher top speed. The 12-part ICE4 of the K3s classification will also be upgraded to 265 km/h (165 mph).

== Introduction, operations, and maintenance ==
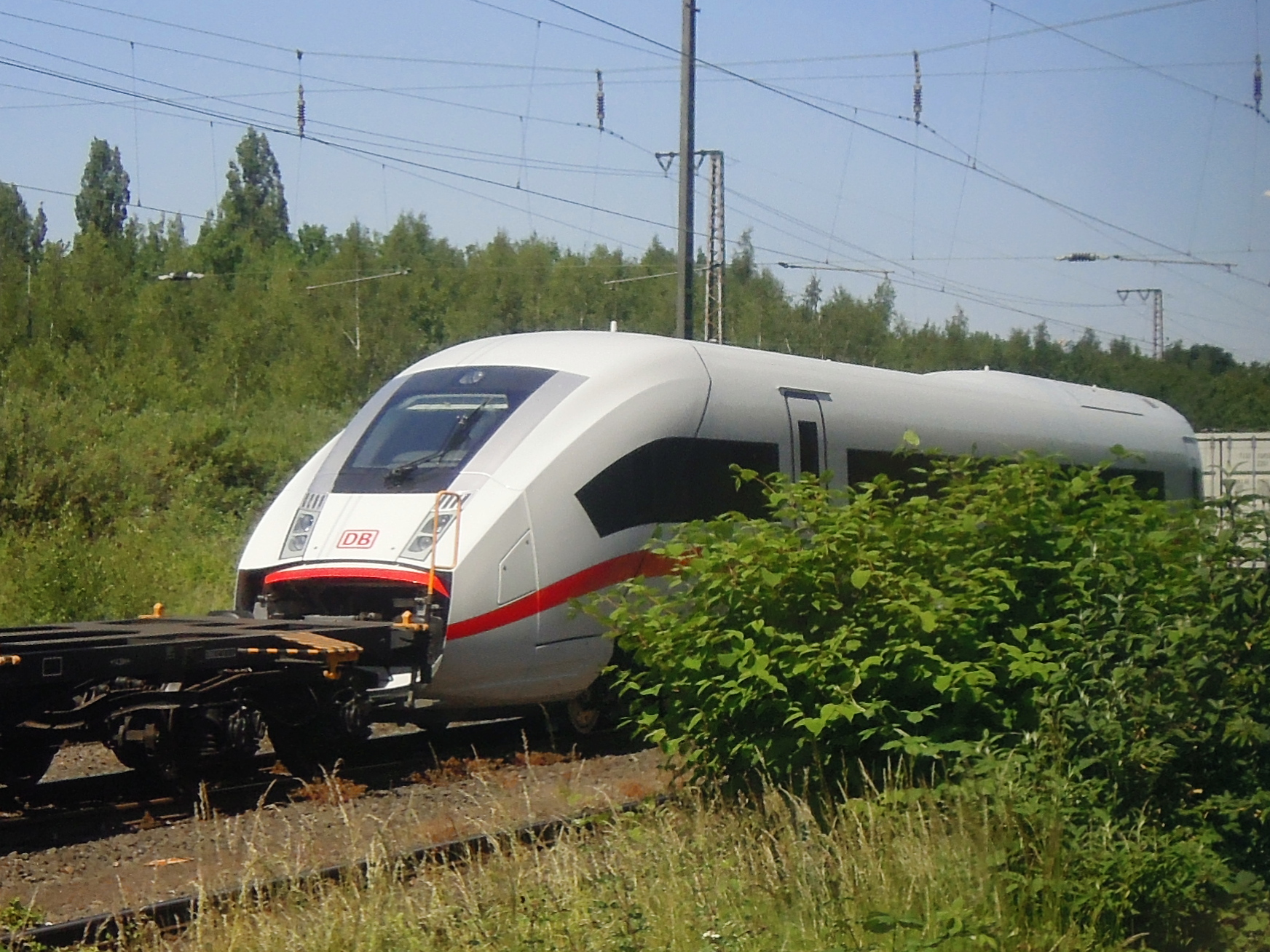
ICx 9004 end car en route to the Wegberg-Wildenrath Test and Validation Centre

By 2013 DB had selected a site in Nippes, Cologne for a maintenance depot for all of its ICE fleet including future ICx trains.

In April 2015 DB Systemtechnik began climatic testing on the ICx cab and other components. Mainline test runs by DB Systemtechnik began on 25 September 2015.

One pre-series-production trainset was formally unveiled at Berlin Südkreuz on 4 December 2015. The trainsets were re-branded ICE 4 at the same time (see also Intercity-Express), and given the network classification Class 412.

On 16 September 2016, Siemens announced that the ICE 4 had been approved for operation by Federal Railway Authority (Eisenbahn-Bundesamt, EBA). Trial passenger operations commenced on Hamburg - Würzburg - Munich services on 31 October 2016 with full service expected from December 2017.

On 26 September 2018, the DB board approved the purchase of 18 additional seven-car trainsets and 50 individual cars to be added to trainsets then on order.

On 4 April 2019 it was announced that due to problems with the carriage frames of the ICE 4 trains, Deutsche Bahn would not take delivery of any further trains. Manufacturers Siemens and Bombardier Transportation were asked by DB to fix the issues.

On 17 July 2019 it was announced that Siemens, Bombardier, and Deutsche Bahn had come to an agreement in which Siemens and Bombardier would fix the trains, which were deemed safe, between 2020 and mid-2023. Further, Deutsche Bahn would begin immediately accepting more deliveries of the trains.

In 2020, it was announced that up to 50 13-car configurations would be put into service from 2021, known publicly as "XXL-ICE" trains. These longer trains will be 374 meters long, and carry up to 918 passengers. Their top speed will also be higher than other models, at 265 km/h (165 mph). In April 2023 the final 13-car train was delivered.

In June 2023 the outstanding orders for the ICE 4 were fulfilled with the delivery of the 137th unit, a 7-car train. Deutsche Bahn for now has chosen to further expand its ICE fleet with the ICE 3 Neo (Class 408) and ICE L.

== Formation ==
=== Seven-car sets ===
The seven-car sets, K1s (former classification K1n), are formed as follows.

Car No.	27/37	26/36	25/35	24/34	23/33	22/32	21/31
Designation	Apmzf 6812.2	ARmz 8812.2	Bpmbsz 7412.2	Bpmz 3412.2	Bpmz 3812.2	Bpmz 3412.7	Bpmdzf 7812.2
Class and function	1. Class; Cab car	1. Class; Bordrestaurant	2. Class; Servicewagen	2. Class			2. Class; Cab car
Seating capacity	50	27 in 1. Class; 16 in Restaurant	44	88			59 +2 folding seats

=== 12-car sets ===
The 12-car sets, K3s, are formed as follows.

Car No.	14	12	11	10	9	7	6	5	4	3	2	1
Designation	Apmzf 0812.0	Apmz 1812.0	Apmz 1412.0	ARmz 8812.0	Bpmbsz 6412.0	Bpmz 9812.0	Bpmz 2412.0	Bpmz 2412.3	Bpmz 4812.0	Bpmz 2412.5	Bpmz 2412.8	Bpmdzf 5812.0
Class and function	1. Class; Cab car	1. Class		1. Class; Bordrestaurant	2. Class; Servicewagen	2. Class						2. Class; Cab car
Seating capacity	50	67		21 in 1. Class; 22 in Restaurant	38	88						59 +2 folding seats

=== 13-car sets ===
The 13-car sets, K4s, are formed as follows.

Car No.	14	12	11	10	9	8	7	6	5	4	3	2	1
Designation	Apmzf 0812.0	Apmz 1812.0	Apmz 1412.0	ARmz 8812.0	Bpmbsz 6412.0	Bpmz 9812.0	Bpmz 2412.0	Bpmz 2412.3	Bpmz 4812.0	Bpmz 2412.7	Bpmz 2412.5	Bpmz 2412.8	Bpmdzf 5812.0
Class and function	1. Class; Cab car	1. Class		1. Class; Bordrestaurant	2. Class; Servicewagen	2. Class							2. Class; Cab car
Seating capacity	50	67		21 in 1. Class; 22 in Restaurant	38	88							59 +2 folding seats

== See also ==
- Intercity Express Programme, contemporary procurement programme for UK high speed and intercity trains
- Siemens Velaro, high speed train
- List of high-speed trains
