= ICE L =

Long distance train (230 km/h)

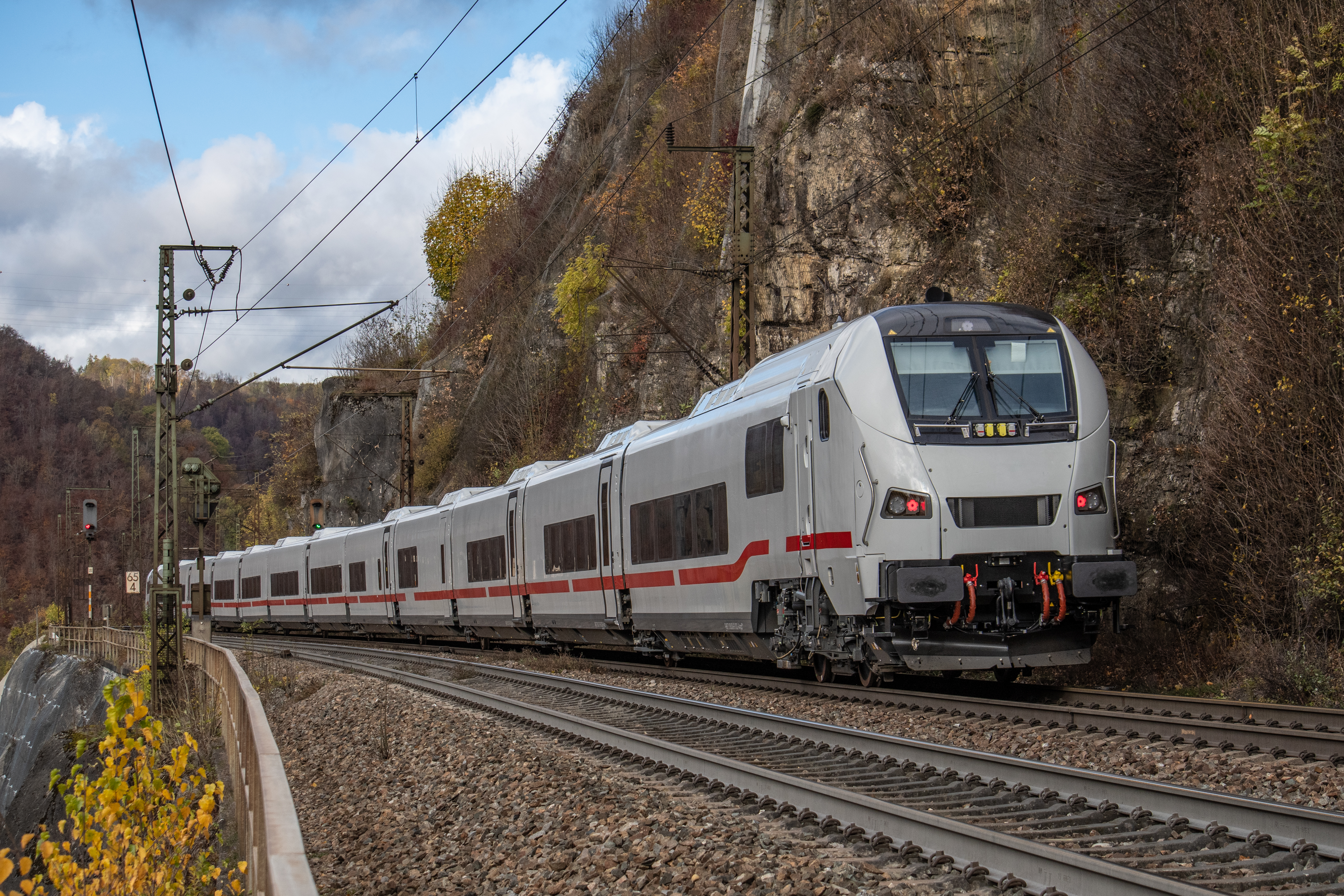
- Test run of ICE L on the Geislinger Steige, November 2023
- Stock type: Push-pull train
- Manufacturer: Talgo
- Assembly: Las Matas, Madrid; Rivabellosa, Álava
- Family name: Talgo 230
- Entered service: 26 October 2025 (domestic); Mid 2026 (international)
- Number under construction: 79 (reduction to 60 currently in negotiations)
- Formation: 17 cars
- Capacity: 562 seats (1st class: 85, 2nd class: 477)
- Operators: DB Fernverkehr, DSB, NS International

Specifications
- Car body construction: Aluminium
- Train length: 236 m (774 ft) (without locomotive)
- Car length: 19.7 m (65 ft) (locomotive); 13.3 m (44 ft) (middle cars); 18.3 m (60 ft) (end cars)
- Width: 2.9 m (9.5 ft)
- Height: 3.6 m (12 ft) (middle cars); 3.8 m (12 ft) (end cars)
- Floor height: 760 mm (30 in)
- Maximum speed: 230 km/h (145 mph)
- Weight: 406 t (400 long tons; 448 short tons) - empty
- Traction motors: 4 × TSA TMF 69-42-4 1,300 kW (1,700 hp) (locomotive only)
- Power output: 5,200 kW (7,000 hp) (locomotive only)
- Electric systems: Overhead line; 25 kV 50 Hz AC; 15 kV 16.7 Hz AC; 1,500 V DC
- Current collection: Pantograph
- UIC classification: Bo′Bo′+2′(1)′(1)′(1)′(1)′(1)′(1)′(1)′ (1)′(1)′(1)′(1)′(1)′(1)′(1)′(1)′(1)′2′
- Safety systems: PZB90, LZB, ATB, ETCS
- Track gauge: 1,435 mm (4 ft 8 1/2 in) standard gauge

ICE L is a long-distance locomotive-hauled push-pull train which is being manufactured by the Spanish company Talgo for the German train operator DB Fernverkehr. The name of the train was changed in 2021 from its previous working title ECx, with the L standing for low-floor entry. The trains form part of the manufacturer's Talgo 230 family of trains. The Talgo Travca locomotives ordered for the service are designated DB Class 105. They are gradually replacing the remaining oldest Intercity (IC) trains and gradually entered service on 26 October 2025 after several delays.

== History ==
In November 2015, Deutsche Bahn announced that it was planning to procure long-distance coaches in addition to the Intercity 2 double-decker trains. These were intended for use on international routes and for operation on non-electrified lines and to have a higher maximum speed than the 160 km/h of the Intercity 2 carriages. The related call for tenders for a framework contract was published on 2 March 2017.

In February 2019, Deutsche Bahn signed a framework agreement with Spanish manufacturer Talgo. Richard Lutz, chairman of Deutsche Bahn, announced that the best offer had been chosen. Siemens Mobility had offered Vectron locomotives along with Viaggio brand passenger Railroad cars. The framework contract includes the delivery of up to 100 trains and in the first call 23 trains were ordered for a total cost that should amount to around 550 million euros. At about 24 million euros, each train is thus much cheaper than an ICE.

The new rolling stock was presented to the public in mid-March 2019, under the working title ECx. Each train is 256 m long and consists of one locomotive and 17 articulated cars. Each car is connected to the neighbouring car with a single-axle bogie, with double-axle bogies only at each end of the set. This gives each train 20 axles, in addition to those of the associated locomotive. Each unit will be delivered with a multi-system-electric DB Class 105 locomotive (Talgo Travca locomotive - 19.5m, 4 axles, 72t). The single-axle carriage construction allows for a weight of 425 tonnes - which in turn makes it slightly lighter than a shorter seven-car ICE 4. Entry and floor heights are 76 cm throughout, allowing for step-free access from suitable platforms, and step-free passage throughout the train. " During 2019, Deutsche Bahn and the Federal Ministry of Transport and Digital Infrastructure jointly announced that all future tenders for long-distance passenger vehicles will have equivalent accessibility requirements (76 cm step-free entry and passage).

Under the existing framework contract, an additional 56 sets were ordered in May 2023 for €1.4bn, taking the total number of sets to 79. However, in September 2025, Talgo reported that it was in negotiations with DB to reduce the total order from 79 down to 60 units. The companies expect to formalize the reduction through a settlement agreement that will also reschedule the remaining ICE L deliveries.

Trains are manufactured in Talgo's factory in Spain, and certification tests took place at the Zughotel in Braunschweig. This was followed by dynamic tests at the Żmigród Test Track Centre in Poland at 160 km/h, which was followed by tests up to 230 km/h in Germany. Climate testing was undertaken at Rail Tec Arsenal in Vienna, as well as other tests in Romania. Owing to delays in production of the DB Class 105 locomotives, reportedly due to the COVID-19 pandemic, Siemens Vectron locomotives were to be leased from NS International to be used on the Berlin-Amsterdam service until these are delivered. Dual mode Vectron locomotives will also be used for the non-electrified lines serving Oberstdorf and Westerland (Sylt).

During production, it was decided to equip the trainsets with the ÖBB Wire Train Bus (WTB) push-pull system, replacing the previously planned proprietary Talgo system. This change allows for the use of various locomotives, rather than limiting operations to the DB Class 105.

On 11 August 2025, DB announced that the ICE L had received technical approval to operate in Germany from the European Union Agency for Railways (ERA) and the German Federal Railway Authority (EBA).

Throughout late 2025 and early 2026, the ICE-L was repeatedly scheduled to run test services between Berlin Hauptbahnhof and Köln Hauptbahnhof.

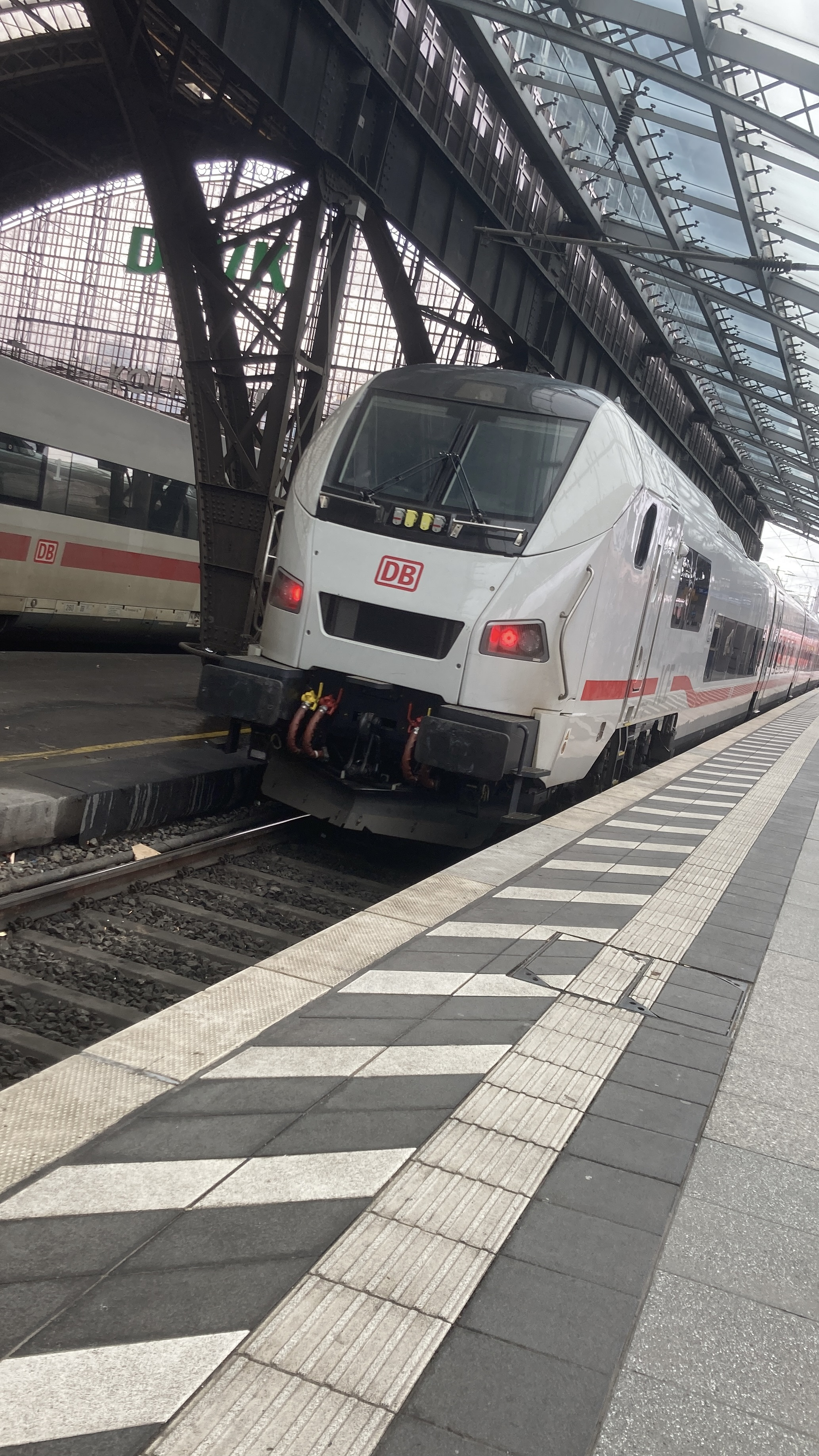
A New ICE-L set on a test run at Cologne HBF 19/2/26

== Design ==
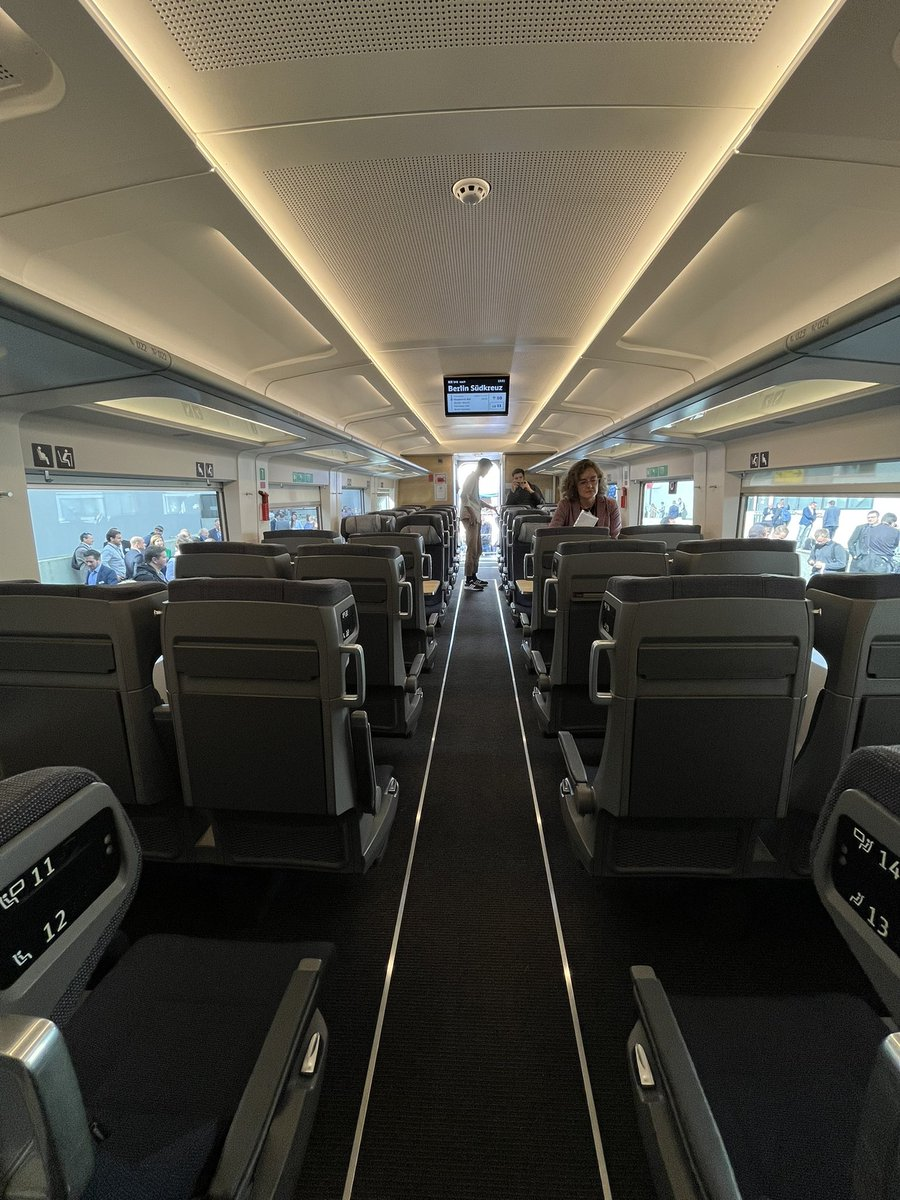
Interior view of second class seating on ICE L prototype

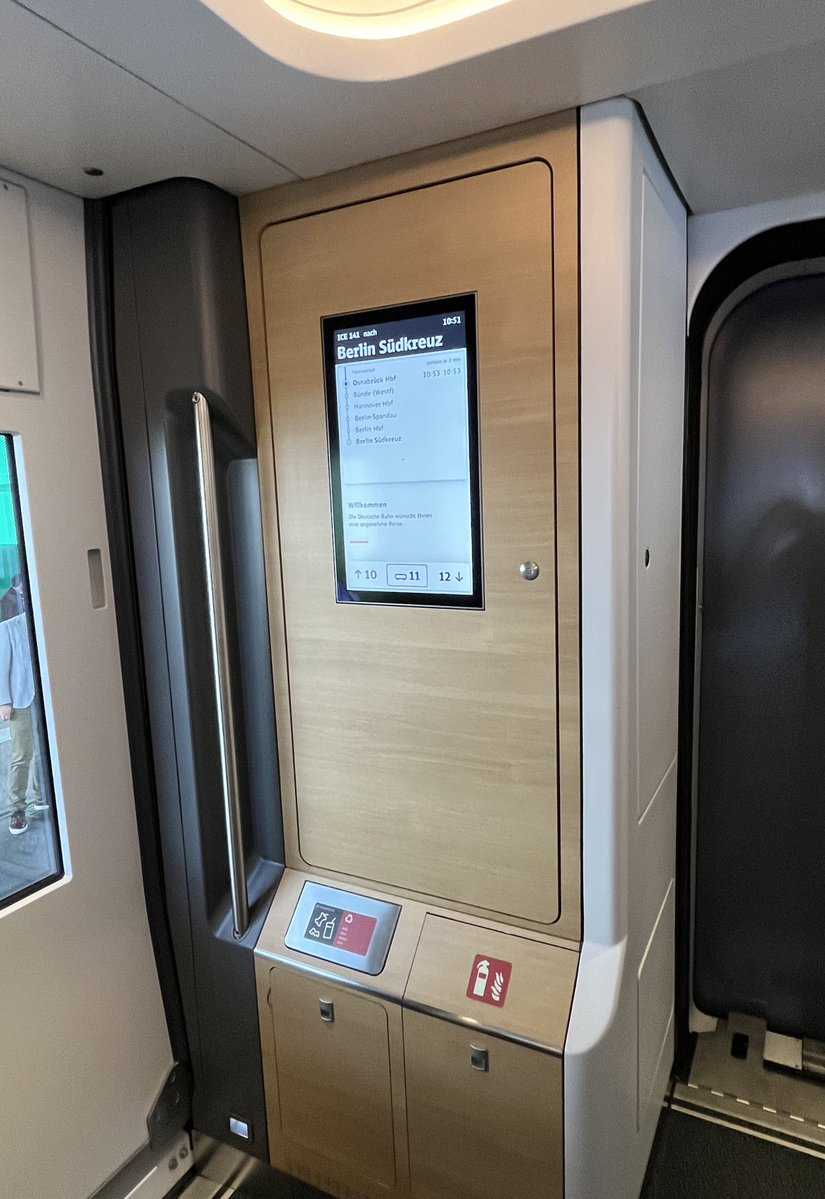
Passenger information screen

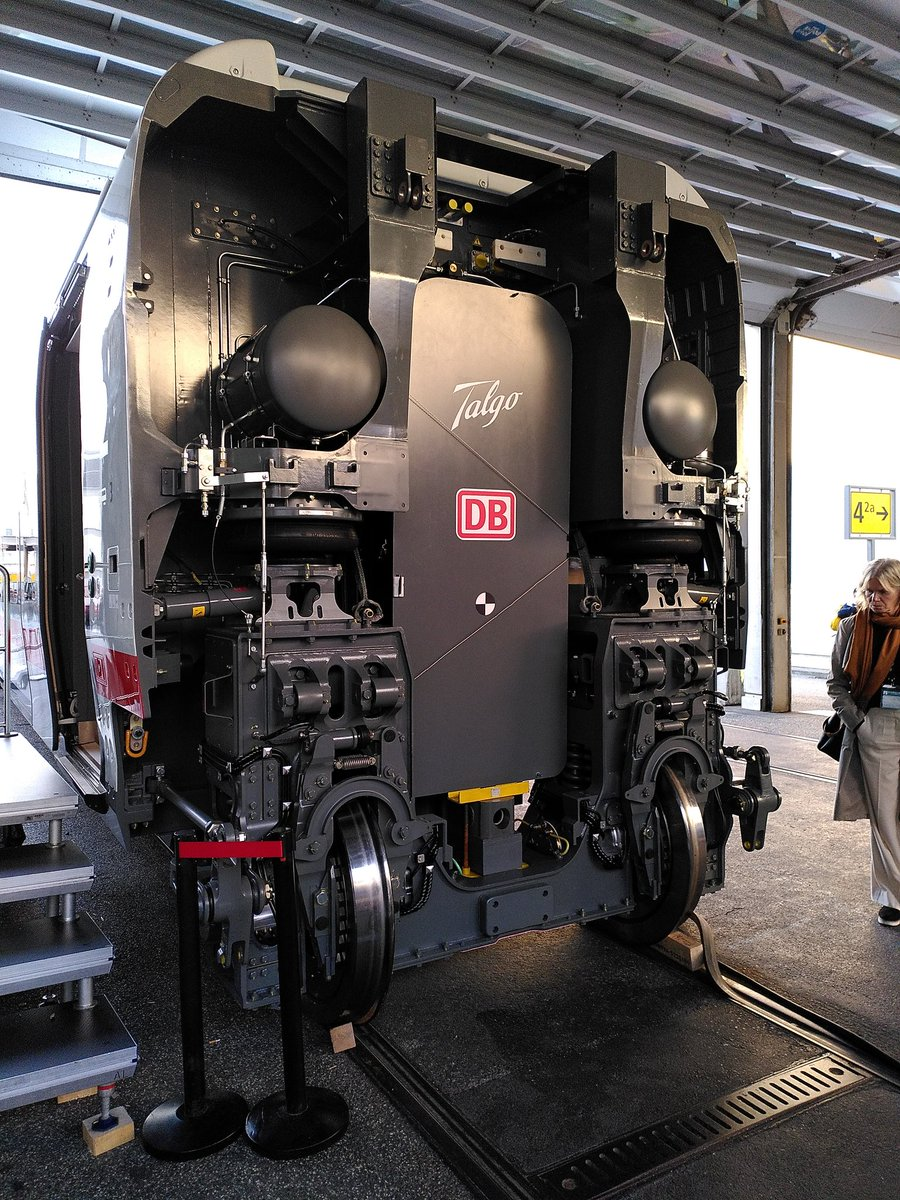
Bogie

ICE L train sets will be certified for 230 km/h (145 mph) operation, and can be hauled either by the supplied Talgo Travca locomotive, or any other diesel or electric locomotive. Individual cars are shorter than typical railway carriages in order to avoid excessive axle load due to the single-axle design, as is typical for the Talgo design.

Each train set will have 477 second-class and 85 first-class seats, three wheelchair spaces, eight bicycle spaces, a bistro car, family areas and a separate toddler area and a family area with play area. Trains will be equipped with Wi-Fi, blind spot detection cameras, onboard entertainment (ICE portal), passenger information systems with real-time data and luggage space. Window glass will be designed to improve signal reception for mobile devices.

Step free entry is possible at suitably constructed platforms due to a continuous 760 mm entry and floor height - one of the standard European platform heights. This helps ensure accessibility in Germany and the Netherlands.

== Routes ==
According to Deutsche Bahn, the trains were originally planned to be put in service from the 2023/24 timetable change onwards and would have appeared on the Berlin - Amsterdam route and then from the summer of 2024 onwards holiday services between Berlin, Cologne, Karlsruhe and Westerland (on Sylt). It was later reported that entry into service would be delayed from autumn 2024 to the middle of 2025, with delays encountered in testing and approval. Further delays were announced in 2025 with entry into service on domestic routes in late 2025 the earliest with international services not before mid-2026. In August 2025, DB confirmed the first trains would enter service with the December timetable change. The first trainsets are likely to work services between Berlin and Cologne.

As of 2019, DB Fernverkehr planned to use the new trains on the following routes:

- Berlin–Amsterdam
- Cologne–Oberstdorf (Winter seasonal)
- Berlin–Westerland (Sylt) (Summer seasonal)
- Cologne–Westerland (Sylt) (Summer seasonal)
- Karlsruhe–Westerland (Sylt) (Summer seasonal)

== Other versions ==
Danske Statsbaner (DSB) has ordered similar higher-speed trains for cross border long distance routes between Denmark and Germany. DSB put the trains into passenger service 1 November 2025 between Østerport and Fredericia, and on 3 November 2025 between Copenhagen and Hamburg.

In March 2025, German media reported that DB Fernverkehr's competitor FlixTrain was negotiating with Talgo to buy 63 similar trains. In May 2025 FlixTrain announced their firm order of 30 Talgo 230 high speed trains (optionally up to 65) and maintenance, for €1.06 billion (with options up to €2.4 billion).
