= FlixTrain =

German open-access operator operating passenger train services in Europe

- Industry: Rail transport
- Founded: 2017
- Headquarters: Munich, Germany
- Products: Long-distance passenger services
- Services: Higher-speed rail
- Owner: Flix SE
- Website: flixtrain.com

FlixTrain GmbH is a German open-access operator of long-distance railway passenger services. It is a subsidiary of the mobility company Flix SE, which also owns long-distance coach operator FlixBus and is supplementing the bus network with rail connections. The company operates closely with FlixBus, sharing its sales channels, marketing efforts, and network planning resources.

== History ==
FlixTrain launched its operations in 2018. Key early investors in the company have included HV Holtzbrinck Ventures, the European Investment Bank, growth equity firm General Atlantic and technology investor Silver Lake.

During late 2017, a partnership was formed between FlixTrain and another open-access operator, Hamburg-Köln-Express (HKX); roughly six months later, HKX services adopted the FlixTrain branding. The BahnTouristikExpress (BTE) was also rebranded as FlixTrain during this time. Both the HKX and BTE had business links to the American Railroad Development Corporation (RDC), which also worked in partnership with FlixTrain. However, on 20 April 2020, it was announced that RDC and FlixTrain had decided to discontinue their partnership. Also during 2017, FlixTrain formed a partnership with the Czech-based open-access operator Leo Express to collaborate on services along the Stuttgart - Berlin route. However, during late 2021, it was announced that this arrangement had been ended due to FlixTrain's temporary suspension as a consequence of the COVID-19 pandemic.

In December 2020, FlixTrain submitted a formal complaint to the European Commission regarding €5 billion in state aid provided by the German government to Deutsche Bahn, alleging improper procedure and the creation of anti-competitive conditions.

By mid-2022, FlixTrain had expanded its network in Germany to cover 70 domestic destinations, had also launched services in Sweden - which ceased in 2024 -, and was offering one line terminating at the Swiss-German border station of Basel Badischer Bahnhof.

In a comparative study by the European umbrella organization Transport & Environment (T&E), FlixTrain 2024 achieved a poor overall result. FlixTrain came in 20th place out of 27 companies. The criteria were reliability, booking, amenities on board and taking bikes on medium and long-distance connections.

== Ticketing ==
Tickets are sold on the FlixBus website, and as with the bus tickets, a ticket is only valid for the booked connection as it also serves as a seat reservation. In contrast, the Deutsche Bahn sells seat reservations separately. FlixTrain's prices are adjusted dynamically in response to expected demand. Deutsche Bahn, on the other hand, has fixed prices and employs dynamic pricing only on saver tickets.

== Services ==
=== Germany ===
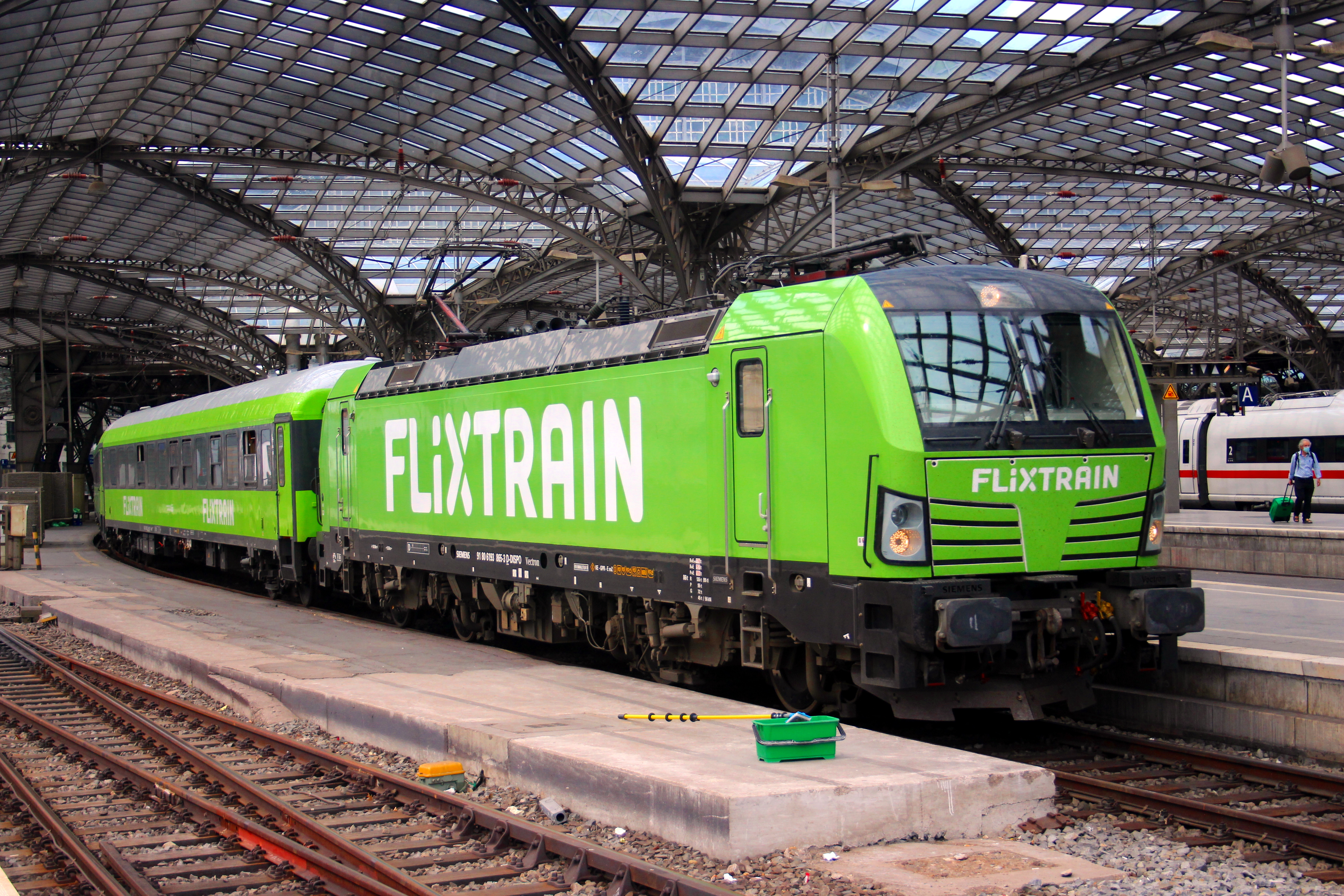
Siemens Vectron in FlixTrain livery in Cologne

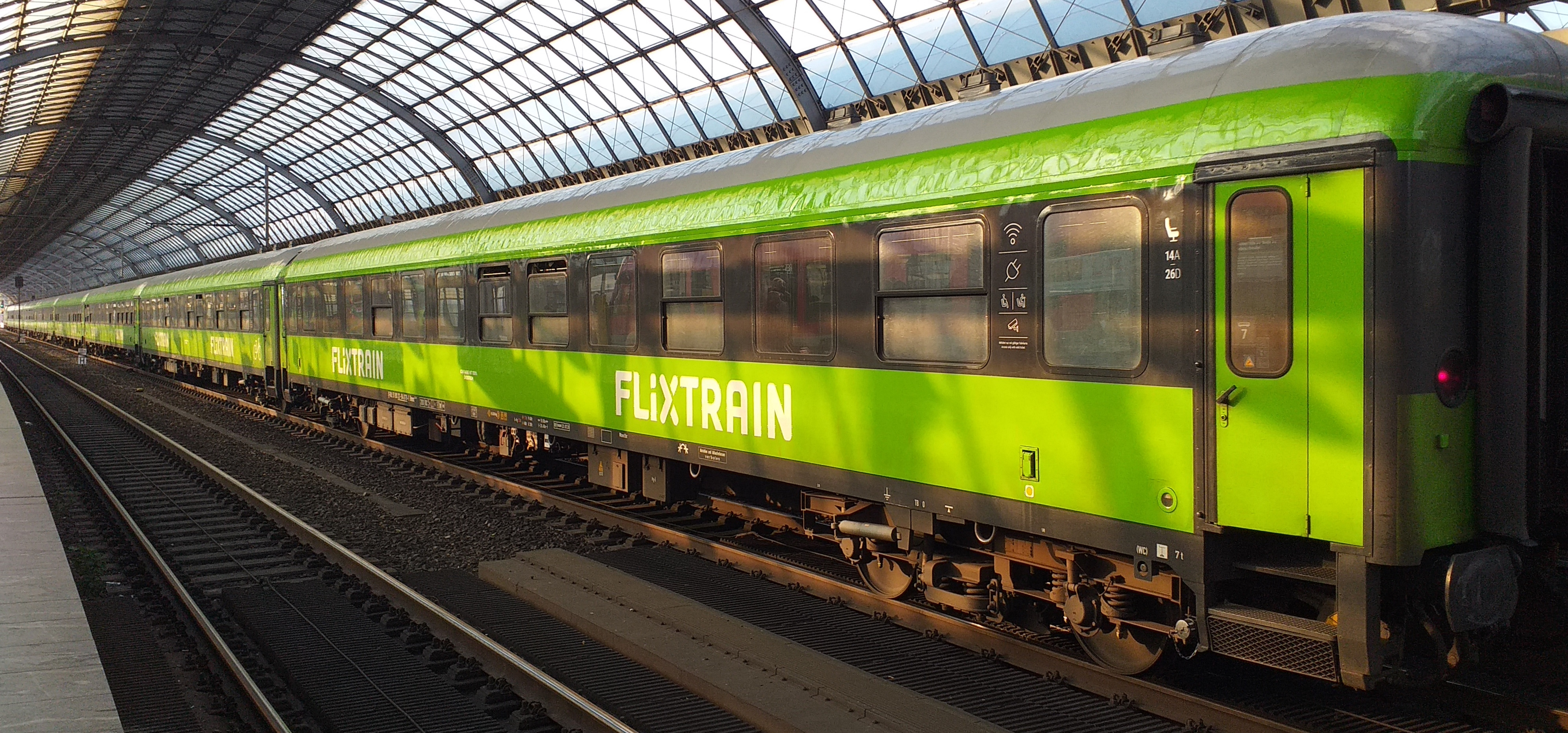
FlixTrain coaches in Berlin

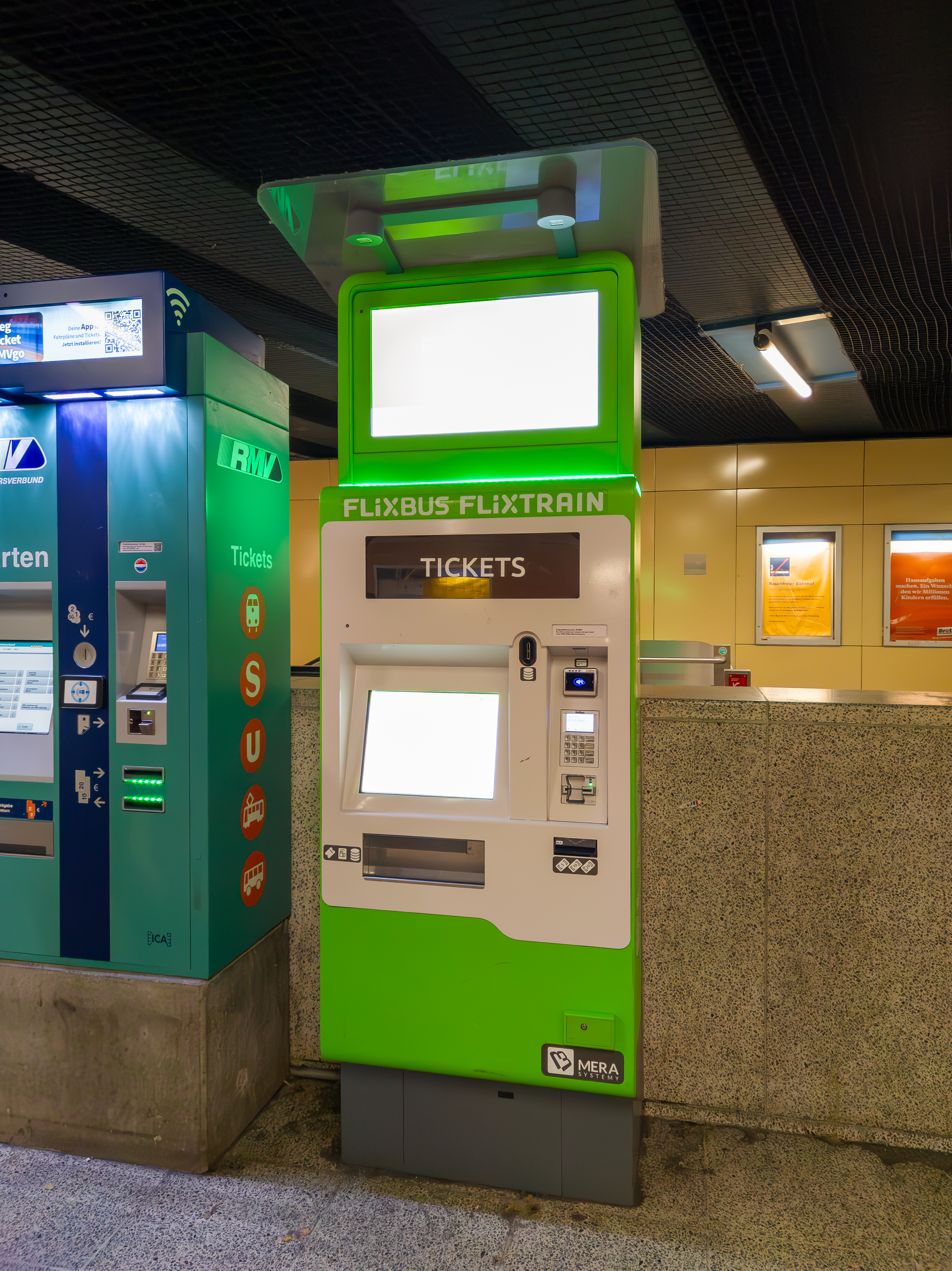
Flix train and Flixbus ticket machine at Frankfurt (Main) Süd station (FlixTrain's main hub in Frankfurt am Main)

On 23 March 2018, FlixTrain's inaugural service departed Hamburg for Cologne. Scheduled services began the following day. On 26 April of that year, in partnership with Leo Express, FlixTrain launched its first service on the Berlin to Stuttgart route.

FlixTrain added seven new destinations to its rail network at the start of a new timetable brought into effect on 15 December 2019. This included a Berlin – Stuttgart service that also called at Leipzig, Halle (Saale), Erfurt, Gotha, Eisenach, and Lutherstadt Wittenberg. Aachen, to the west of Cologne, was also added to the network. A new Hamburg – Stuttgart service was planned for the spring of 2020. Under FlixTrain's 2020 timetable, it was operating trains on three long-distance intercity routes, each being served by two trains per day. On 20 March 2020, services were suspended temporarily in response to the COVID-19 pandemic. While operations resumed on 23 July, the company again suspended all its services during October 2020 at the start of the pandemic's second wave; it was decided during the suspension to overhaul FlixTrain's rolling stock. In April 2021, FlixTrain announced the restart of operations the following month, and up to four services per day were running on its Berlin - Cologne and Hamburg - Cologne routes from 20 May.

During early 2021, the company decided to expand the number of services that it would operate to include a new Hamburg - Berlin - Leipzig service, launched on 27 May, a Munich - Augsburg - Würzburg- Aschaffenburg - Hanau - Frankfurt route, launched on 18 June, and FlixTrain's first sleeper train between Hamburg - Berlin - Munich, launched on 17 June. FlixTrain noted that these new services added 16 cities and towns to its network. This move came in spite of a general downturn in passenger traffic as a consequence of the pandemic; it was speculated that this expansion had been encouraged, at least in part, by the German government’s announced removal of track access fees for 2020 and 2021.

In May 2022, the company announced the addition of three new routes, increasing its network by 12 destinations, expanding to a total of 70 destinations inside Germany; furthermore, service frequency was also increased on the existing Munich - Cologne - Hamburg and Hamburg - Berlin - Leipzig routes. Perhaps the most high-profile part of this announcement was the pending launch of FlixTrain’s first cross-border service, running between Berlin and the Swiss city of Basel; operations began on 23 June 2022.

=== Sweden (2021–2024) ===
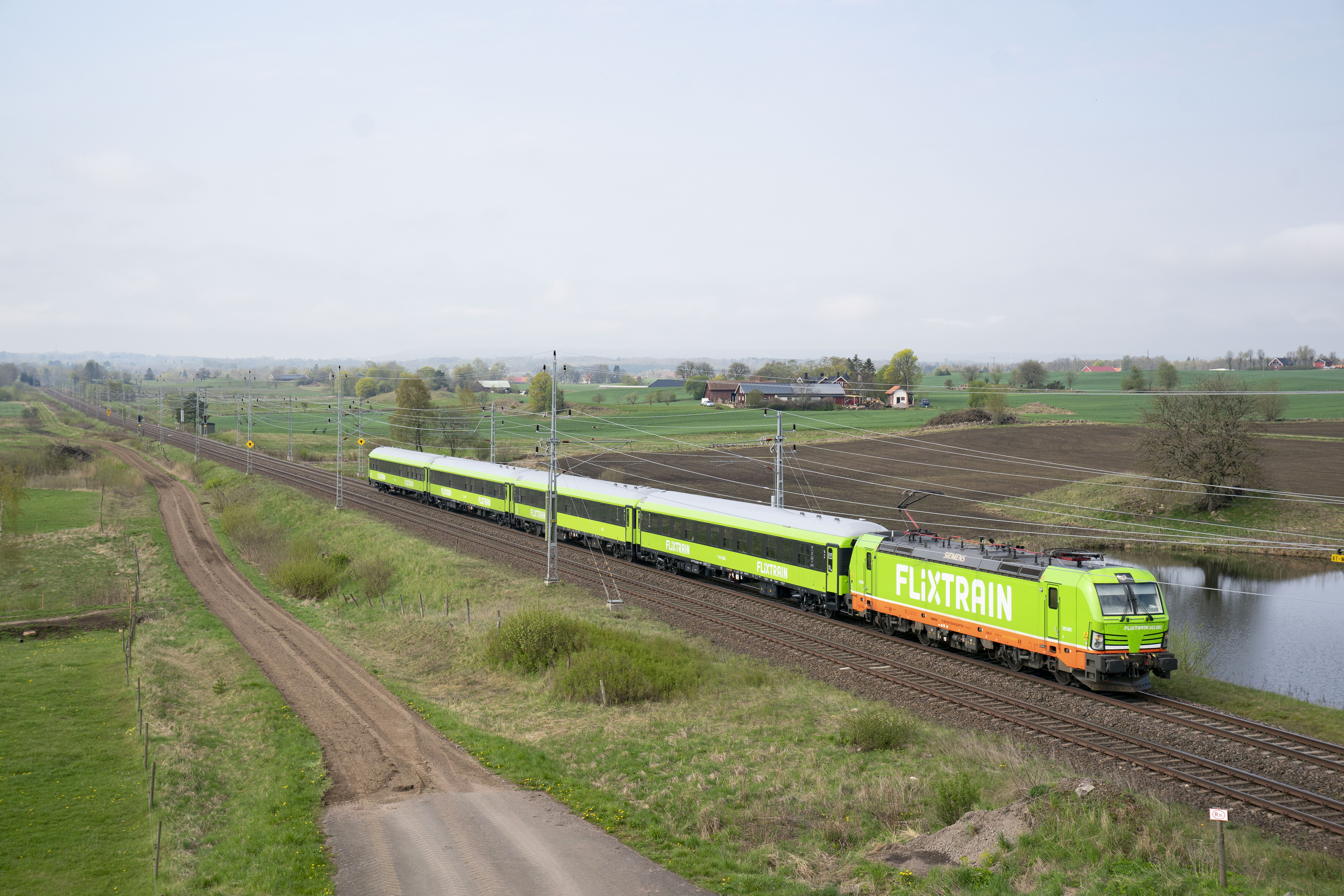
A FlixTrain from Gothenburg to Stockholm (May 2021)

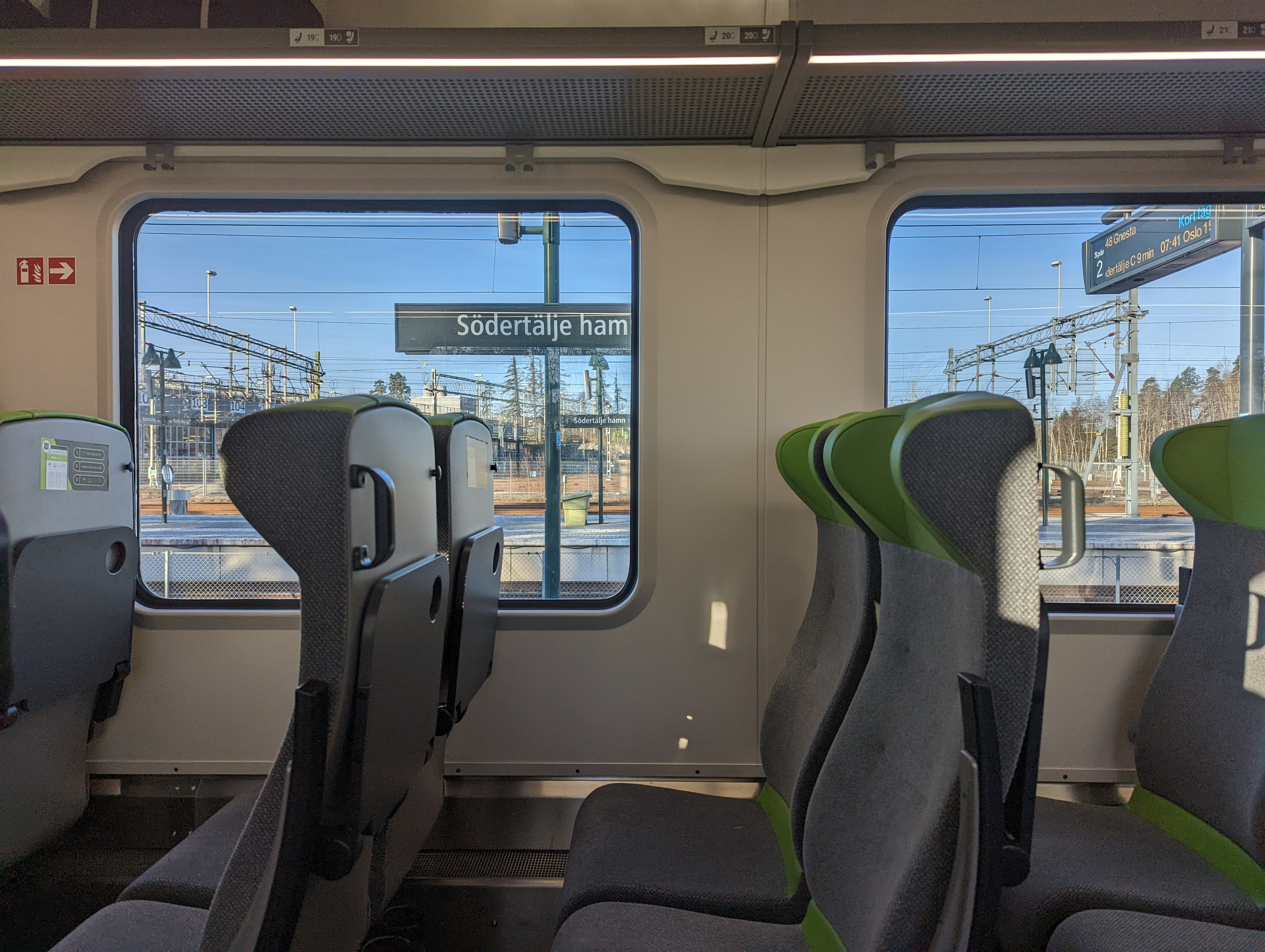
FlixTrain interior at Södertälje hamn railway station

In late 2019, FlixTrain announced plans to launch its first service outside Germany with new services in Sweden, covering Stockholm – Gothenburg and Stockholm – Malmö. Originally intended to be launched during the first half of 2020, services in Sweden commenced on 6 May 2021.

Stockholm-based rail operator Hector Rail, provided the locomotives and personnel, and had three Vectron locomotives painted in FlixTrain livery.

The passenger carriages used were 15 refurbished German coaches from the 1960s and 1970s, previously owned by Deutsche Bahn and leased from the German rolling stock leasing company Railpool. Each carriage seated around 100 passengers, and used a narrower loading gauge than standard Swedish passenger trains. The trains were approved for speeds up to 200 km/h, and the journey between Stockholm and Gothenburg took approximately three and a half hours, including three stops.

Initially, FlixTrain operated 19 trains per week, but this was reduced to 10–12 during the autumn and winter of 2021–2022. During the summer of 2022, the company returned to 19 departures per week, in response to the changes due to the pandemic.

In late 2022, FlixTrain eliminated stops in Södertälje, Hallsberg, and Falköping, cutting travel time to just over three hours to compete more effectively with SJ, the national rail operator, and MTRX, a rival open-access operator.

In March 2023, FlixTrain suspended all train services between Stockholm and Gothenburg after a large number of carriages were damaged by flying ballast following track work. The carriages were sent to Germany for repairs, and normal traffic resumed a couple of months later. As of September 2023, the proposed Uppsala – Stockholm – Malmö route had not materialised, but was still in consideration.

All of FlixTrain's Swedish train services were abruptly paused in January 2024, with FlixTrain citing problems with carriage maintenance and de-icing amid Swedish winter conditions. Initial claims suggested a temporary suspension, however in April 2024, FlixTrain announced that it would suspend services in Sweden entirely, and move the carriages to Germany to supply the increased demand there.

=== Other countries ===
Further expansion of FlixTrain's operating area into various other countries has been mooted. In 2019, the company applied for track access in both Sweden and France in anticipation of the upcoming liberalisation of the European railway network during the following year. During the late 2010s, plans for expanding into the French market were reportedly set in motion, with an anticipated launch date for services during either 2020 or 2021; these ambitions were indefinitely postponed in April 2020. The company claimed this was due to the high cost of securing paths in France in comparison to other European markets.

In 2023, FlixTrain applied to run international services between Germany and the Dutch cities of Arnhem, Utrecht, Amsterdam and The Hague to Rotterdam.

FlixTrain also planned to run twice a day between Berlin and Warsaw starting December 2025, however, due to multiple planned closures in 2026 and unknown later plans of those on the line between Frankfurt and Berlin, it was decided to suspend this connection indefinitely.

== Rolling stock ==
FlixTrain does not usually own the rolling stock that it operates. Instead, the company decided to lease these assets from other companies. Early FlixTrain rolling stock was sourced from the BahnTouristikExpress (BTE); this business relationship came to an end in early 2020. Another provider of rolling stock to the company has been Talbot Services, based in Aachen. FlixTrain has reportedly arranged for its trains to be powered exclusively by green electricity.

FlixTrain has primarily opted for carriages of refurbished locomotive-hauled UIC-standard passenger coaches hauled by 3rd generation Siemens EuroSprinter and Siemens Vectron locomotives. During 2020, FlixTrain entered into a co-operative agreement with the European railway leasing company Railpool; according to the two companies, all of the leased coaches are equipped with new seats and have amenities such as modernized toilets, power sockets at each seat, Wi-Fi technology, and onboard entertainment systems.

During February 2022, the Russian manufacturer Transmashholding (TMH) was reportedly in discussions with FlixTrain for the supply of 65 sets of coaches capable of speeds of up to 230km/h; the proposed deal, valued at €1 billion, was set to rely upon external financiers to buy the rolling stock and then lease it to FlixTrain. The 2022 Russian invasion of Ukraine made the proposed deal unfeasible and led the company to investigate alternative options.

=== FlixTrain Talgo 230 ===
During early-2025 FlixTrain had been negotiating with Talgo to buy up to 63 Talgo 230 trains similar to DB Fernverkehr's new ICE L trains. On 27 March 2025 FlixTrain placed an order worth €1.06 billion with Talgo, for thirty locomotive-hauled trainsets and fifteen years of maintenance. The trains would be capable of operating across the Netherlands, Austria, Germany, Denmark and Sweden, with a framework for increasing the order up to 65 trainsets. Haulage would be via separately-procured Siemens Vectron locomotives.
