= Immenstadt–Oberstdorf railway =

Immenstadt–Oberstdorf
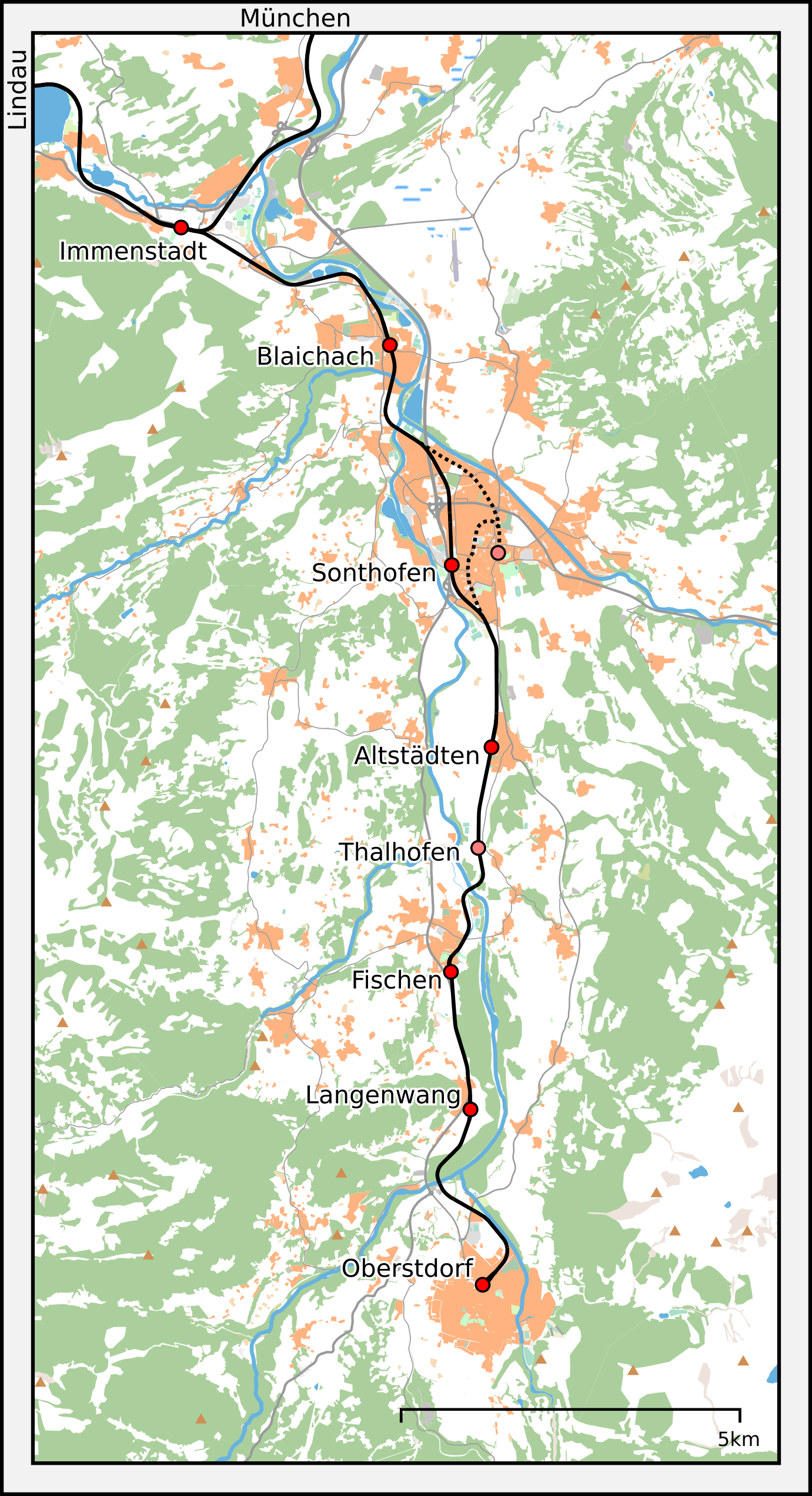

Overview
- Line number: 5402
- Locale: Bavaria, Germany

Service
- Route number: 970, 975

Technical
- Line length: 20.702 km (12.864 mi)
- Track gauge: 1,435 mm (4 ft 8 1/2 in) standard gauge

The Immenstadt–Oberstdorf railway is a non-electrified, single-track railway in the German state of Bavaria. The standard gauge line branches off the Buchloe–Lindau railway in Immenstadt and runs via Sonthofen to Oberstdorf. For its whole length it is in the district of Oberallgäu and follows the course of the Iller river. The branch line is operated by Deutsche Bahn. Together with the Neu-Ulm–Kempten railway, the line is also called the Iller Valley Railway (German: Illertalbahn). It is used by timetable routes 970 and 975.

== History ==
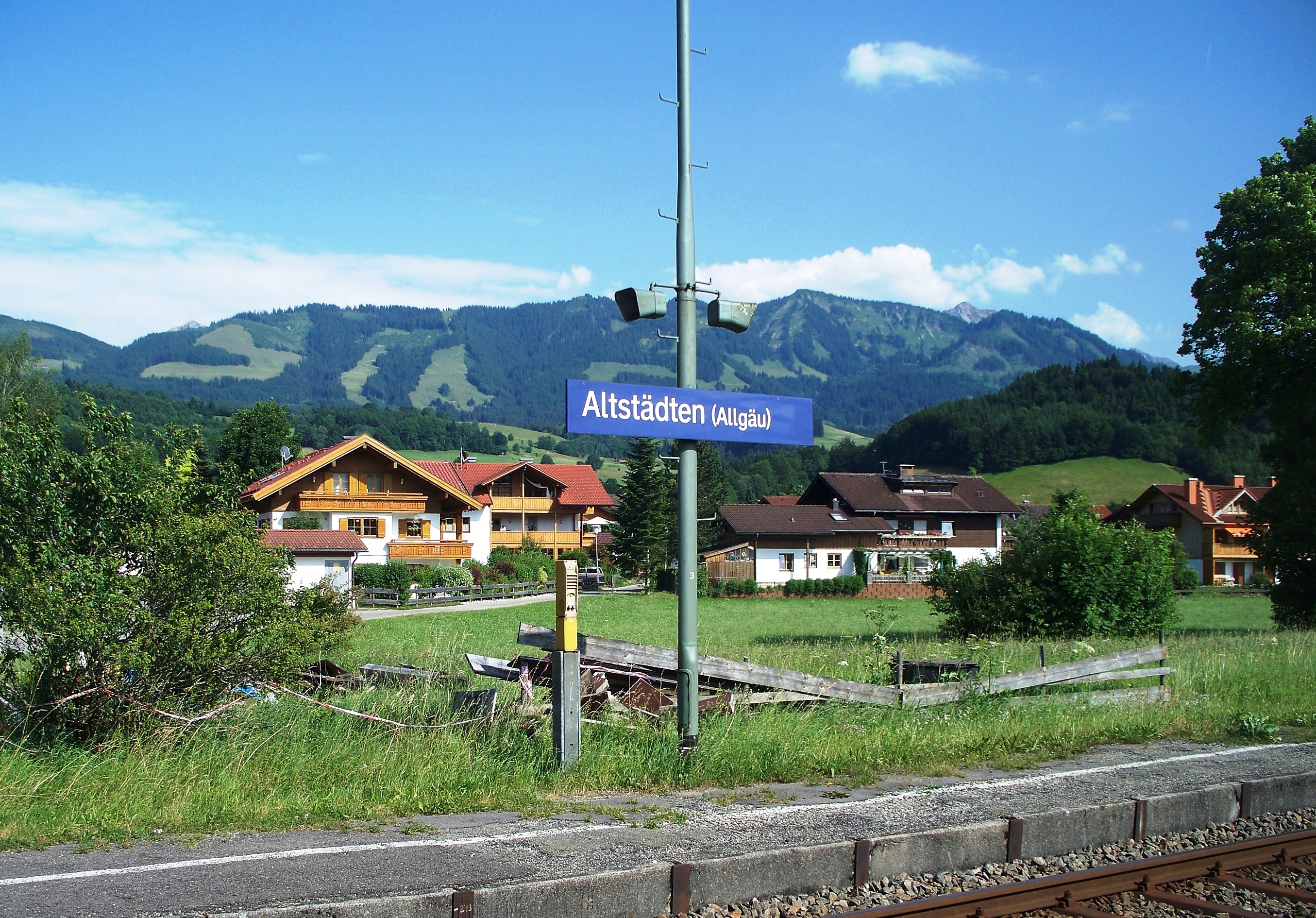
Altstädten (Allgäu) station

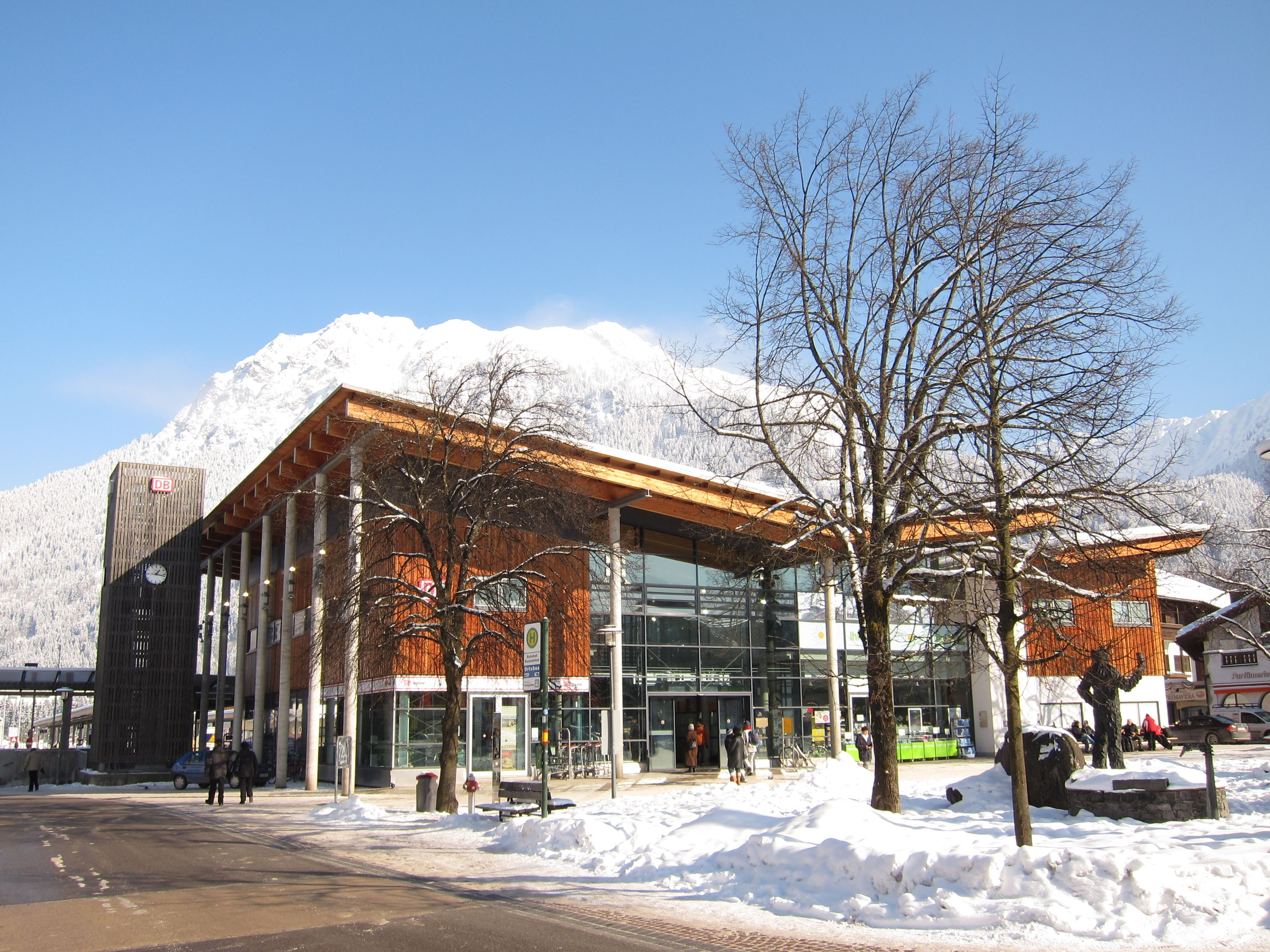
Oberstdorf station

After Immenstadt had been connected to the railway network by the Allgäu Railway in 1853, Sonthofen sought to be connected to the network by a branch line. The 8.33 km long Vizinalbahn (a local railway in Bavaria that was built to lower technical standards) was opened on 16 November 1873 and was operated by the Royal Bavarian State Railways. The new line branched off from Immenstadt station to the east, so trains coming from Kempten (Allgäu) and running to Oberstdorf have to reverse in Kempten.

The 13.38 km long line from Sonthofen to Oberstdorf was opened by the Lokalbahn AG (LAG) company on 29 July 1888. It was classified as a secondary line. It shared the terminus in Sonthofen with the State Railways. The private LAG also took over operations on the existing Immenstadt–Sonthofen section.

With the nationalisation of the LAG on 1 August 1938, the Deutsche Reichsbahn became responsible for the entire route, which was now administered by the Reichsbahndirektion Augsburg. The Deutsche Bundesbahn eventually replaced the old Sonthofen station with the current through station on the western outskirts on the route to Oberstdorf on 2 October 1949. With the construction of the connecting curve at the same time, the line was shortened time from 21.71 to 20.704 km. The construction of the new Sonthofer station commenced on 15 November 1937, but was delayed due to the war and was not recommenced until 30 August 1948.

The old Sonthofen station building—it was located on Promenadestraße, opposite the junction with Schnitzerstraße—was demolished in 1962 as part of the redevelopment of Oberallgäuer Platz. The name of the street Am Alten Bahnhof there means "at the old station".

Oberstdorf also had a separate Bahnbetriebswerk (locomotive depot) until 23 March 1951. It was then converted into a branch of Kempten locomotive depot.

== Operations ==
The line is used by two long-distance trains each day, only one running both ways. The Intercity Nebelhorn from Hamburg to Oberstdorf and back. The Intercity Allgäu runs from Oberstdorf to Dortmund (in the opposite direction it runs from Ulm as a Regional-Express service).

Three Regional-Express services run every day on the line every two hours. These connect Oberstdorf via Immenstadt and Kempten with Ulm (RE 75), Munich (RE 76) and Augsburg (RE 17). Two pairs of these services are attached or detached in Immenstadt to services to/from Lindau to form the Allgäu-Franken-Express to/from Nuremberg via Augsburg. The offer is supplemented by individual services that only run between Kempten or Immenstadt and Oberstdorf. These are operated by DB Regio Bayern.

The RE 17 and RE 76 services are operated with class 612 sets, while the RE 75 services are operated with Pesa Link sets.
