= Schweizer Eisenbahn-Revue =

Swiss rail transport trade journal

- Cover of the 1/2009 issue.
- Editor: Walter von Andrian
- Categories: Rail transport
- Frequency: Monthly
- Circulation: c. 10,000 (2008)
- Founded: 1978
- Company: Minirex AG
- Country: Switzerland
- Based in: Lucerne
- Language: German
- Website: http://www.minirex.ch
- ISSN: 1022-7113

Schweizer Eisenbahn-Revue (SER) (English: Swiss Railway Review) is a Swiss trade journal for the rail transport industry.

== History and profile ==
Appearing monthly since 1978, the SER is written by correspondents (some writing anonymously) in rail transport companies, in the industry and in government. Each issue consists of four parts: reports from Switzerland, reports from other European countries, international reports and a number of articles covering current topics on one or two pages each. The editorial line is frequently critical of the Swiss state railways and its government regulators.

The SER is published by Minirex AG, a Lucerne-based publisher of railway books, and edited by Minirex owner Walter von Andrian. Minirex also publishes three sister publications of the SER, which share some of its content: Eisenbahn Österreich (EBÖ) and Schienenverkehr aktuell, both covering Austria, Eisenbahn-Revue International (ERI), dedicated to international matters, and Railway Update, a bi-monthly English-language publication.

As of 2014, the Minirex publications are not available in an electronic format.

== See also ==
- List of railroad-related periodicals
