= Fuxing (train) =

Chinese high-speed electric multiple unit

Fuxing (Rejuvenation)
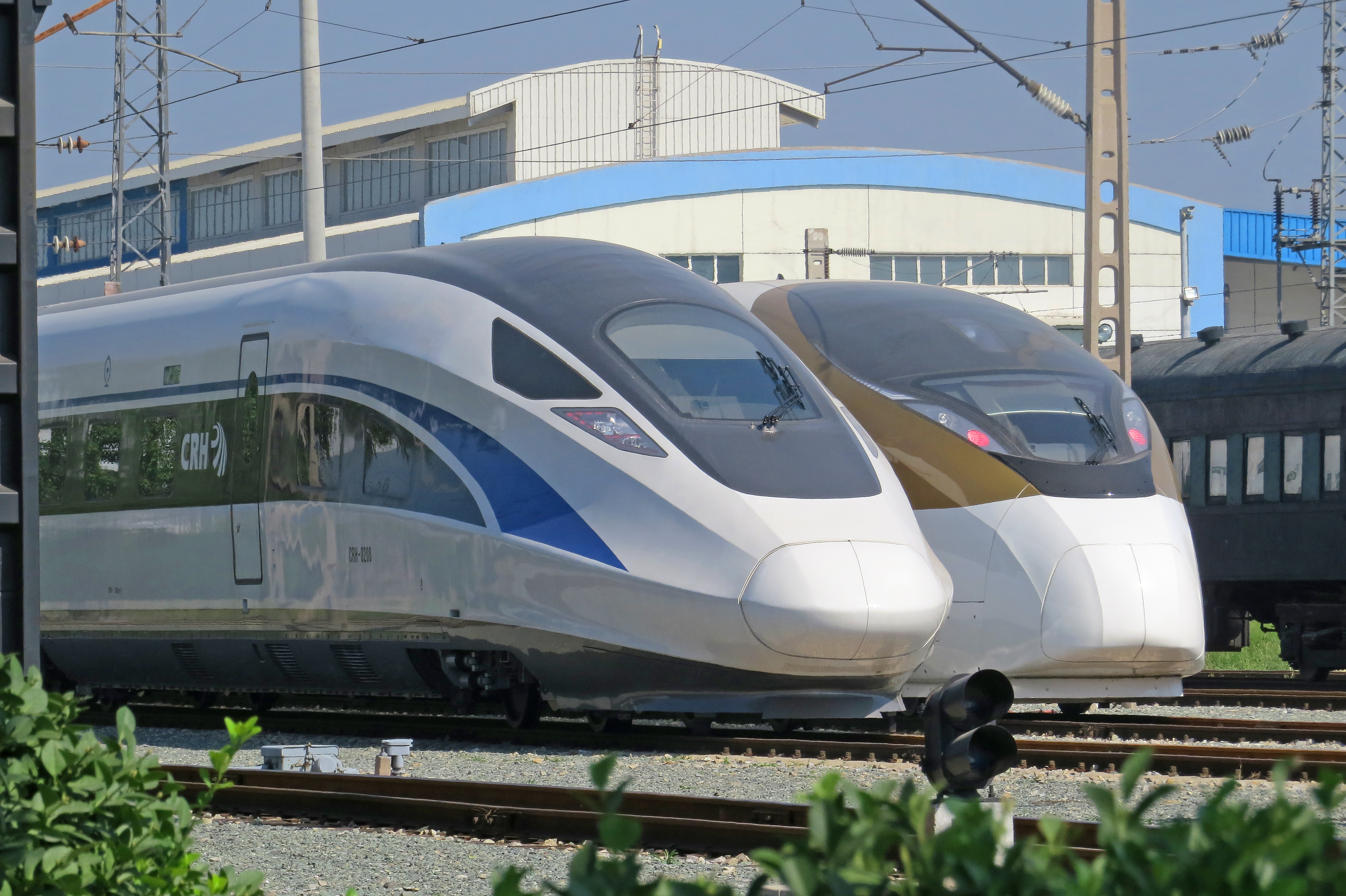
- CR400AF-0208 made by CRRC Qingdao Sifang and CR400BF-0507 made by CRRC Changchun are tested on Beijing Circular Railway. The paint is non-standard.
- Stock type: Electric multiple unit
- In service: 15 August 2016 – Present
- Manufacturers: CRRC Qingdao Sifang; CRRC Changchun Railway Vehicles; CRRC Tangshan Railway Vehicle
- Formation: CR400AF/BF/CR300AF/BF/KCIC400AF: 8 cars/trainset (4M4T); CR400AF–A/BF–A:16 cars/trainset (8M8T); CR400AF–B/BF–B:17 cars/trainset (8M9T)
- Capacity: CR400AF/BF: 556 or 576; CR400AF–A/BF–A: 1193; CR400AF–B/BF–B: 1283
- Operators: China Railway Corporation; PT Kereta Cepat Indonesia China; Laos–China Railways Company Limited
- Lines served: Beijing–Shanghai HSR; Beijing–Guangzhou–Shenzhen–Hong Kong HSR; Beijing–Tianjin ICR; Xuzhou–Lanzhou HSR; Shanghai–Kunming HSR; Guangzhou–Zhuhai ICR; Guiyang–Guangzhou HSR; Jinan–Qingdao HSR; Jakarta–Bandung Whoosh HSR; Hangzhou–Fuzhou–Shenzhen railway; Bangkok–Nong Khai high-speed railway (Planned)

Specifications
- Train length: CR400AF: 209 m (685 ft 8 in); CR400AF–A: 414 m (1,358 ft 3 in); CR400BF: 209.06 m (685 ft 11 in); CR400BF–A: 414.26 m (1,359 ft 1 in); CR400AF–B: 439.9 m (1,443 ft 3 in); CR400BF–B: 439.9 m (1,443 ft 3 in)
- Width: 3,360 mm (11 ft 0 in)
- Height: 4,050 mm (13 ft 3 in)
- Platform height: 1,250 mm (4 ft 1.2 in)
- Maximum speed: Service: 350 km/h (220 mph); Design: 400 km/h (250 mph); Record: 420 km/h (260 mph)
- Axle load: <17 t (16.7 long tons; 18.7 short tons)
- Traction system: Water-cooled IGBT-VVVF inverter control (Zhuzhou CRRC Times Electric)
- Traction motors: YQ-625 external sector 3-phase AC induction motor (Zhuzhou CRRC Times Electric)
- Electric system: 25 kV 50 Hz AC Overhead catenary
- Current collection: Pantograph
- Track gauge: 1,435 mm (4 ft 8 1/2 in) standard gauge

Fuxing
- Simplified Chinese: 复兴号
- Traditional Chinese: 復興號
- Literal meaning: Rejuvenation
Transcriptions
Standard Mandarin
- Hanyu Pinyin: Fùxīng Hào
- Bopomofo: ㄈˋ ㄒㄧㄥ ㄏㄠˋ

Alternative Chinese name
- Simplified Chinese: 中国标准动车组
- Traditional Chinese: 中國標準動車組
- Literal meaning: China Standardized EMU
Transcriptions
Standard Mandarin
- Hanyu Pinyin: Zhōngguó Biāozhǔn Dòngchē Zǔ

Fuxing (simplified Chinese: 复兴号; traditional Chinese: 復興號; pinyin: Fùxīng Hào; lit. 'Rejuvenation'), also known as the CR series EMU (or as the Fuxing Hao), is a series of high-speed and higher-speed EMU trains operated by China Railway High-speed (CRH) and developed by CRRC. They are the first successful high-speed trains to be designed and manufactured in China.

Initially known as the China Standardized EMU, development on the project started in 2012, and the design plan was finished in September 2014. The first EMU rolled off the production line on 30 June 2015. The series received its current designation of Fuxing in June 2017, with nicknames such as "Red Dragon" (CR400AF) and "Golden Phoenix" (CR400BF) for certain units. It is among the world's fastest conventional high-speed trains in regular service, with an operating speed of 350 km/h (220 mph) for the CR400AF and CR400BF models.

Internationally exported versions of the train sets also operate in Indonesia on the Jakarta–Bandung high-speed railway from 2023, with a derivative version of the CR400AF, also known as the KCIC400AF or "Komodo Merah" (literally: red Komodo dragon) or "Petir Merah" (literally: red lightning).

The upcoming CR450AF and CR450BF, designed for a maximum operating speed of 400 km/h (250 mph), are expected to enter service by 2025. In 2023, Chinese state media reported a CR450 train attained a speed of 453 km/h (281 mph) during a test run.

== History ==
=== Background ===
In 2004, China's Ministry of Railways contracted Bombardier Transportation, Kawasaki Heavy Industries and Alstom to supply the first high-speed trains for China, which later known as Hexie (simplified Chinese: 和谐号; traditional Chinese: 和諧號; pinyin: Héxié Hào; lit. 'Harmony'), with Chinese partners CNR and CSR. The four foreign companies agreed to manufacture high-speed trains for China as well as provide technology transfer for local production.

Some of the Hexie (Harmony) train sets are manufactured locally through technology transfer, a key requirement for China. The signalling, track and support structures, control software, and station design are developed domestically with additional foreign elements. By 2010, the track system as a whole was predominantly Chinese. China currently holds many new patents related to the internal components of these trains, re-designed in China to allow the trains to run at higher speeds than the foreign designs allowed.

However, most of Hexie's (Harmony's) patents are only valid within China, and as such hold no international power. The weakness of intellectual property of Hexie caused obstacles for China to export its high-speed rail related technology, which led to the development of the completely redesigned train brand called Fuxing (simplified Chinese: 复兴号; traditional Chinese: 復興號; pinyin: Fùxīng Hào; lit. 'Rejuvenation') that is based on local technology.

=== Development ===
Started in 2012, CNR Changchun Railway Vehicles (now CRRC Changchun Railway Vehicles), under the guidance of China Railway Corporation, with a collection of enterprises, universities, and research institutes, carried out the development of a more advanced China Standardized EMU. In December 2013, CRRC Changchun completed developing the general technical conditions for EMUs, and completed the plan design in September 2014. The new EMU was rolled off the production line on 30 June 2015.

According to the arrangement for the China Standardized EMU research and development work, the EMUs will receive 600,000 km (372,823 mi) experimental verification and optimization. They started to experimental work at National Railway Test Center of China Academy of Railway in Beijing after they rolled off, and they were tested at up to 160 km/h (100 mph).

On 18 November 2015, the China Standardized EMU hit a speed of 385 km/h (240 mph) and passed the high-speed test on Datong–Xi'an high-speed railway. The EMU was tested under complicated conditions, including on bridges, in tunnels, and on slopes and turns.

On 15 July 2016, the two China Standardized EMUs in opposite directions passed each other at 420 km/h (260 mph) (relative speed to one another of 840 km/h (520 mph)) during test runs on Zhengzhou–Xuzhou high-speed railway.

=== Commercialization ===
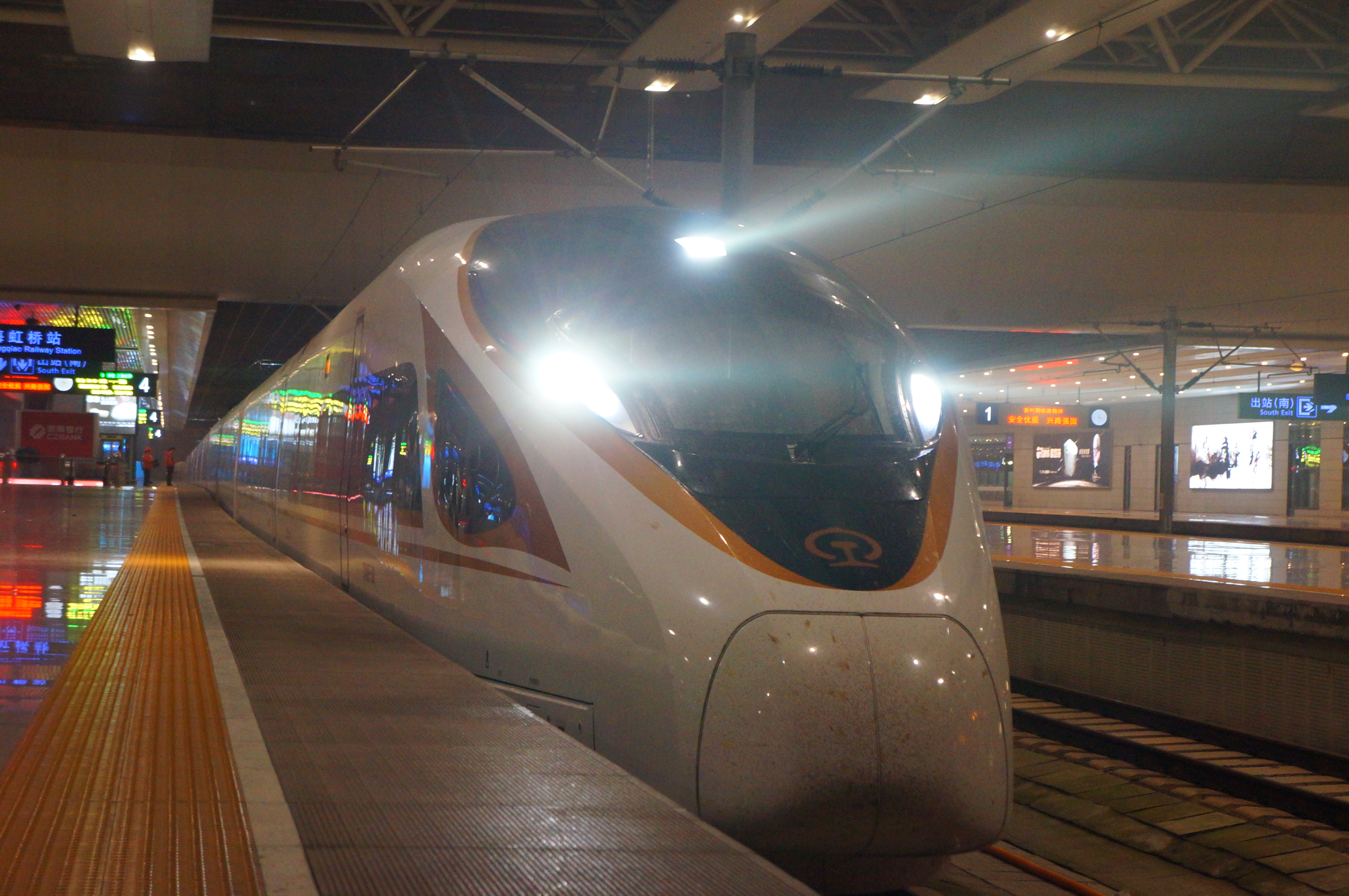
Fuxing begins its operation on Beijing–Shanghai high-speed railway since 28 June 2017. Train G155 by Shanghai-based CR400BF from Beijing South railway station arrives at Shanghai Hongqiao railway station

On 15 August 2016, the China Standardized EMU has started operation on Harbin–Dalian High-Speed Railway. The train was running as Train No. G8041 and departed from Dalian North railway station to Shenyang railway station.

From the end of 2016 to the beginning of 2017, several subsidiaries of CRRC gained licences from the National Railway Administration to produce the rolling stocks.

The China Standardized EMU started its experimental long haul service on Beijing–Hong Kong High-Speed Railway on 25 February 2017.

On 25 June 2017, the official public name of the China Standardized EMU was unveiled as "Fuxing", signaling a departure from the "和谐号" (Harmony) branding of the previous high speed trains. The next day, a CR400AF departed on its maiden journey from the Beijing South railway station, traveling toward Shanghai, at the same time a CR400BF left Shanghai Hongqiao railway station on its maiden journey bound for Beijing.

After extensive testing since its debut, 350 km/h (220 mph) operation returned to the Beijing–Shanghai high-speed railway using Fuxing trains on 21 September 2017, once again making the Chinese high speed railway network the fastest in the world.

== Specifications and technical features ==
An 8-car Fuxing set is 209 m (685 ft 8 in) long, 3.36 m (11 ft 0 in) wide and 4.06 m (13 ft 4 in) high. It has an axle load of less than 17 t (37,479 lb). The train can carry 556 passengers, with 10 in business class, 28 in first class, and 518 in second class. The train also reduces energy consumption, and adopts a standard parts design. It also has reinforced safety features compared with older EMUs.

The spacing of seats of Fuxing (Rejuvenation) is larger than Hexie (Harmony), with the first class at 1,160 mm (46 in) and the second class 1,020 mm (40 in). It also provides Wi-Fi access.

== Variants ==
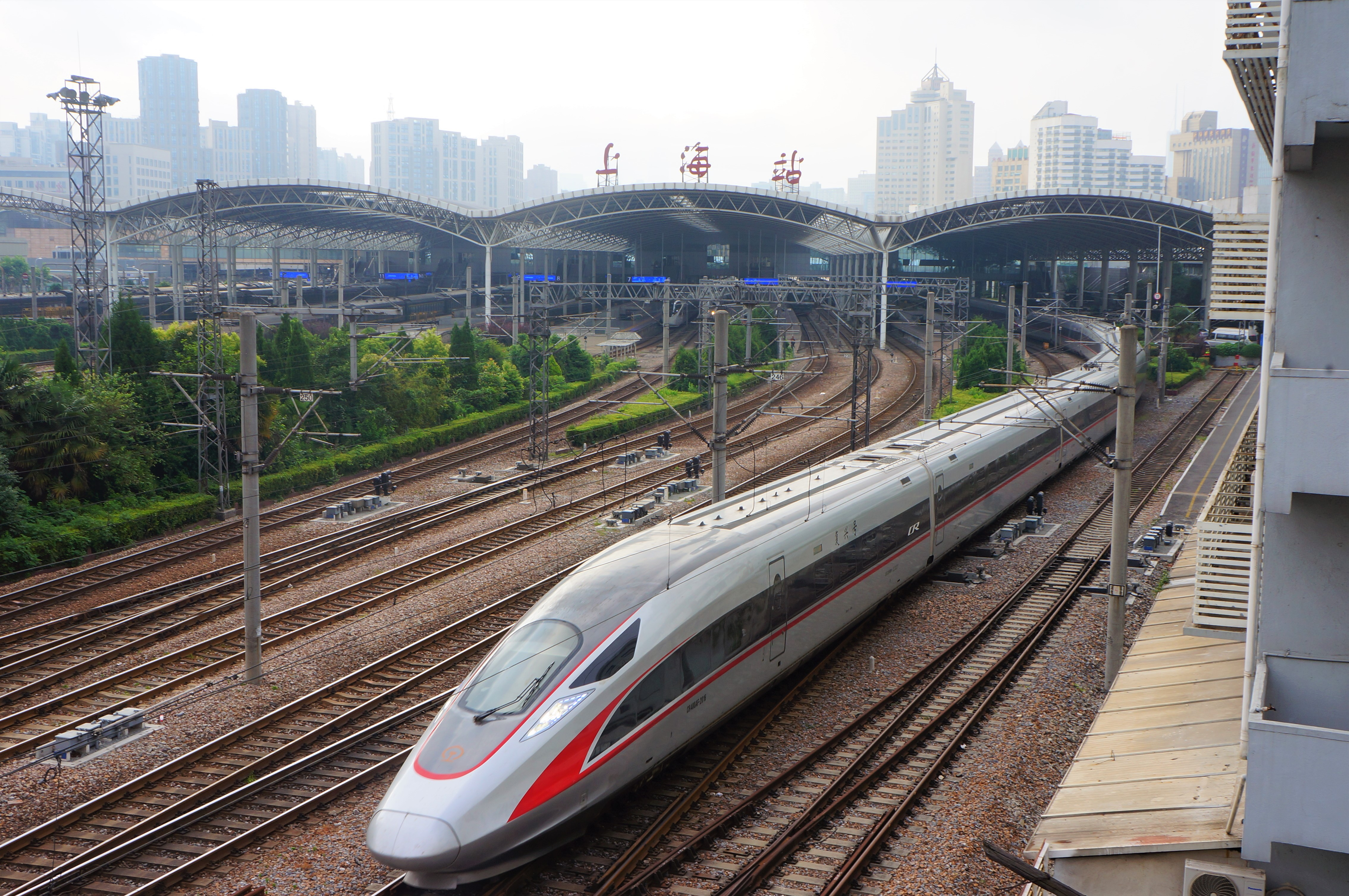
CR400AF-2016 departing Shanghai railway station as G6

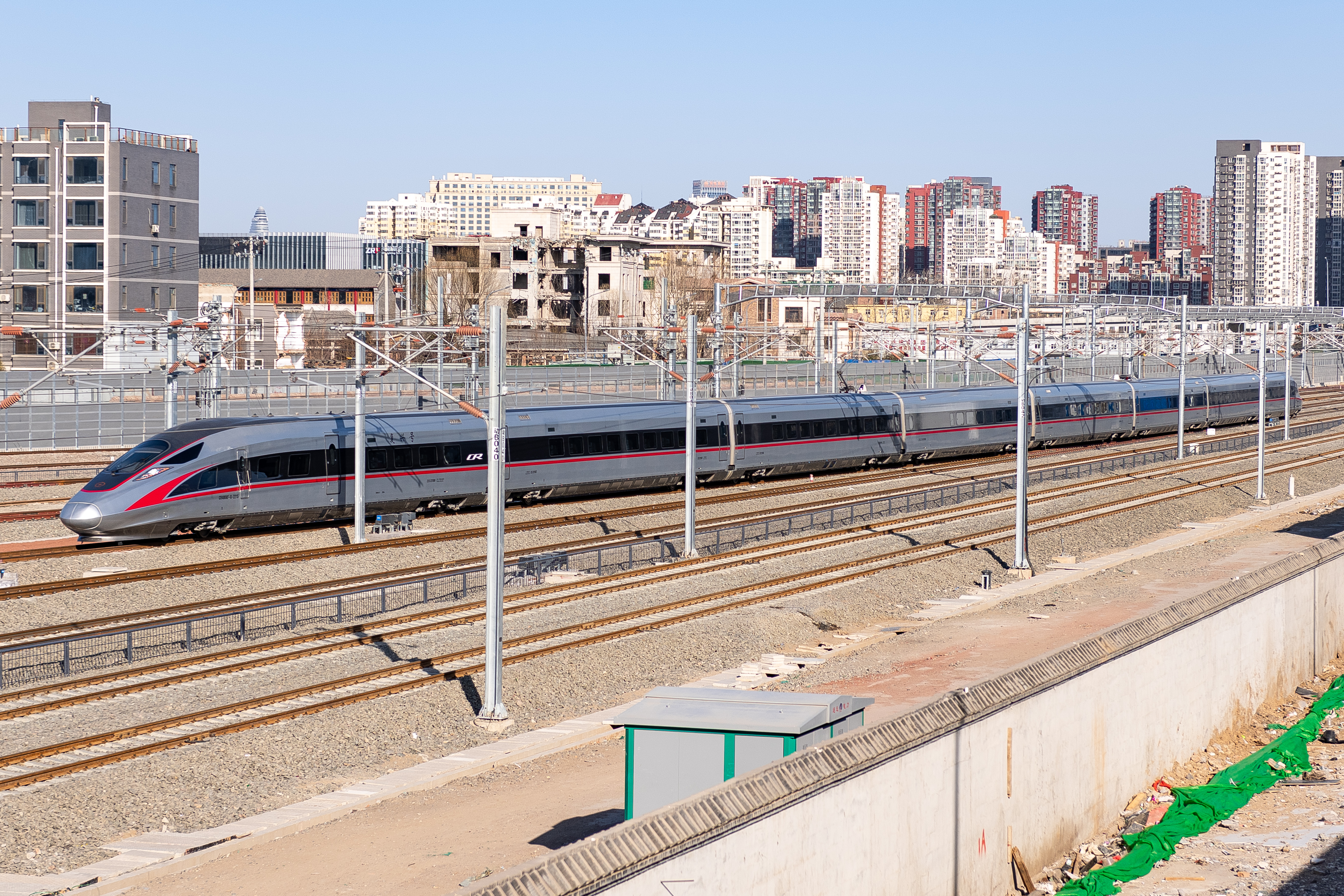
CR400AF-G extreme weather version at Beijing Chaoyang railway station

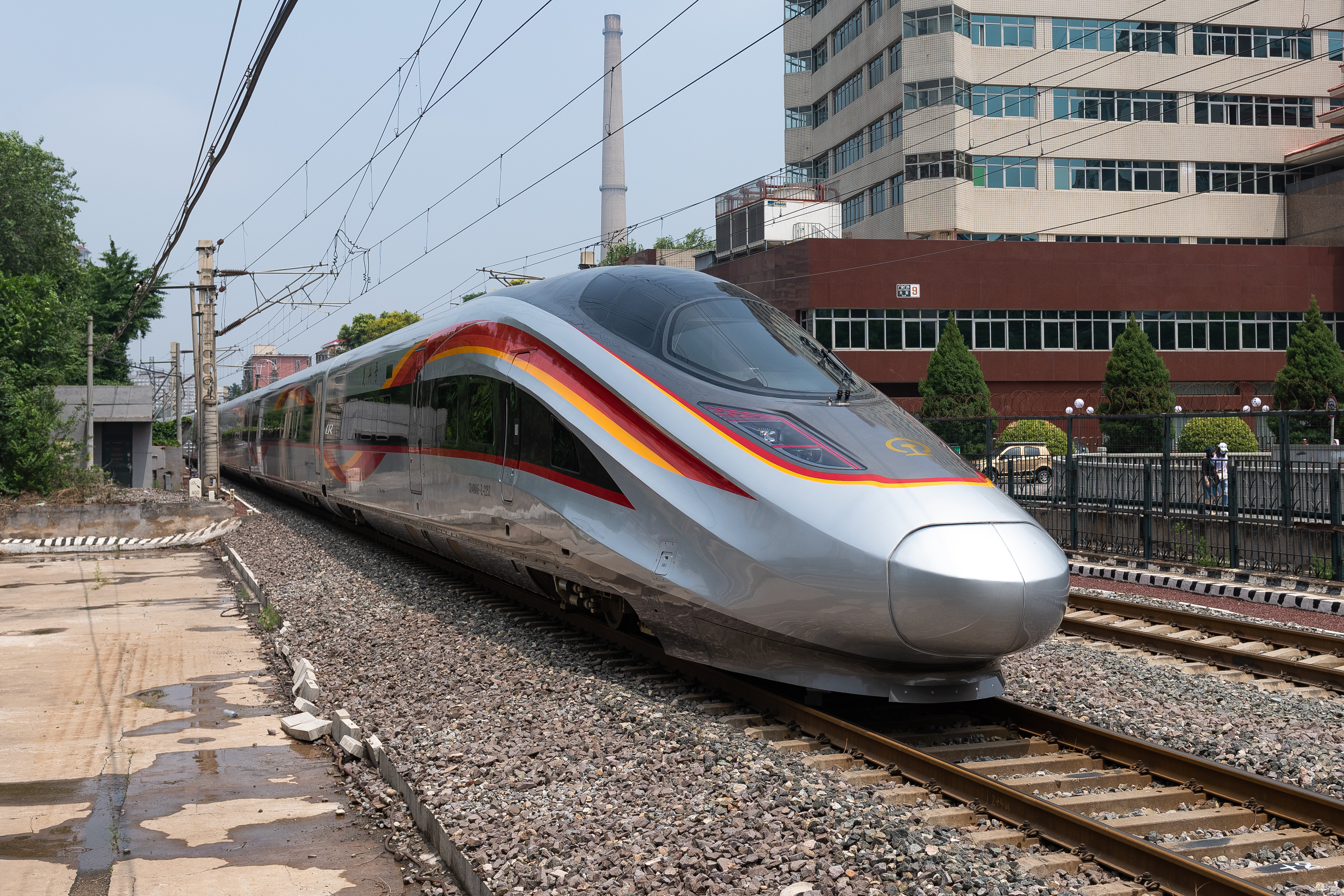
CR400AF-Z smart trainset seen on Beijing–Kowloon railway

All variants of Fuxing train are compatible. The EMU models shares the same standard required by the China State Railway Group Company, hence the name China Standardized EMU. Fuxing train models can be identified by the designation. The number in the designation represents the speed class in kilometers per hour. The first letter after speed is the manufacturer code, with A being the CRRC Qingdao Sifang and B being the CRRC Changchun Railway Vehicles. The second letter after the speed represents whether the train set is powered by self-propelled multiple units or locomotives.

For CR400AF and CR400BF series EMUs, there may also be a letter as a sub-model.

The letter "A" represents the 16-car grouping. Compared with the ordinary standard type, carriages 8 and 9 are designed to be connected. "B" represents the 17-car grouping. Compared with the 16-car grouping, one second-class car is added to increase the passenger flow capacity during peak periods. "G" stands for those that can operate in harsh conditions. Although the overall data and structure are the same as the ordinary standard type, it has the added ability to withstand wind, sand, rain, snow, fog, ultraviolet rays and other severe weather. It can drive in low-temperature environments of –40 °C. Some variants have two letters indicating combined configuration, such as type GZ being the train set featuring sandstorm and cold resistant capability (type G) and redesigned interior and exterior (type Z).

CR450AF

The CR450AF is an 8-car prototype model with operating speed of 400 km/h (248.5 mph).

CR450BF

Similar to the CR450AF, the CR450BF is an 8-car prototype model with operating speed of 400 km/h (248.55 mph)

=== CR400AF Series ===
CR400AF
The CR400AF is an 8-car standard production model locomotive with a standard maximum speed of 420 km/h (260 mph). It is manufactured by CRRC Qingdao Sifang.

KCIC400AF/AF-CIT

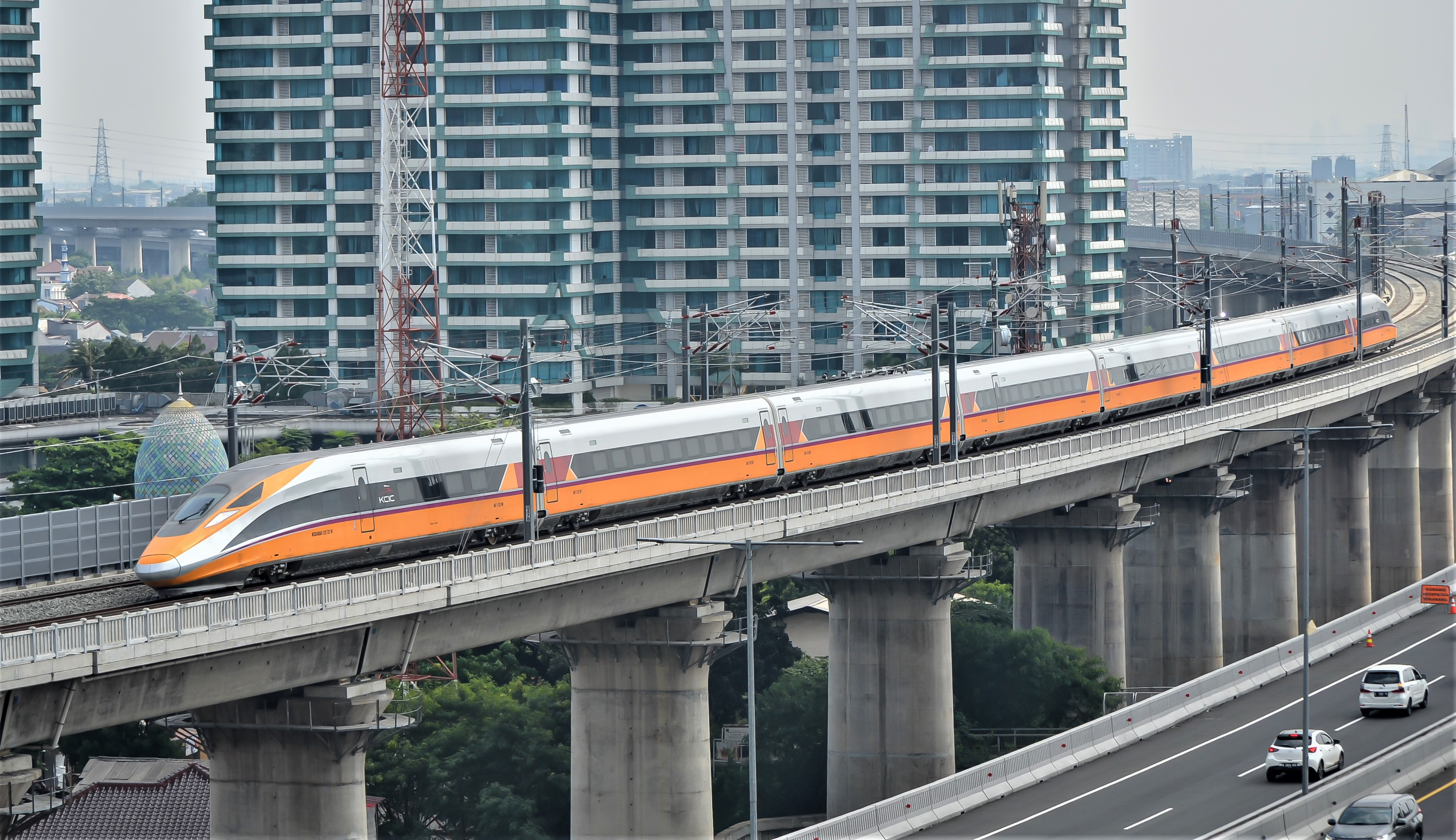
KCIC CIT400AF passes through Bekasi city

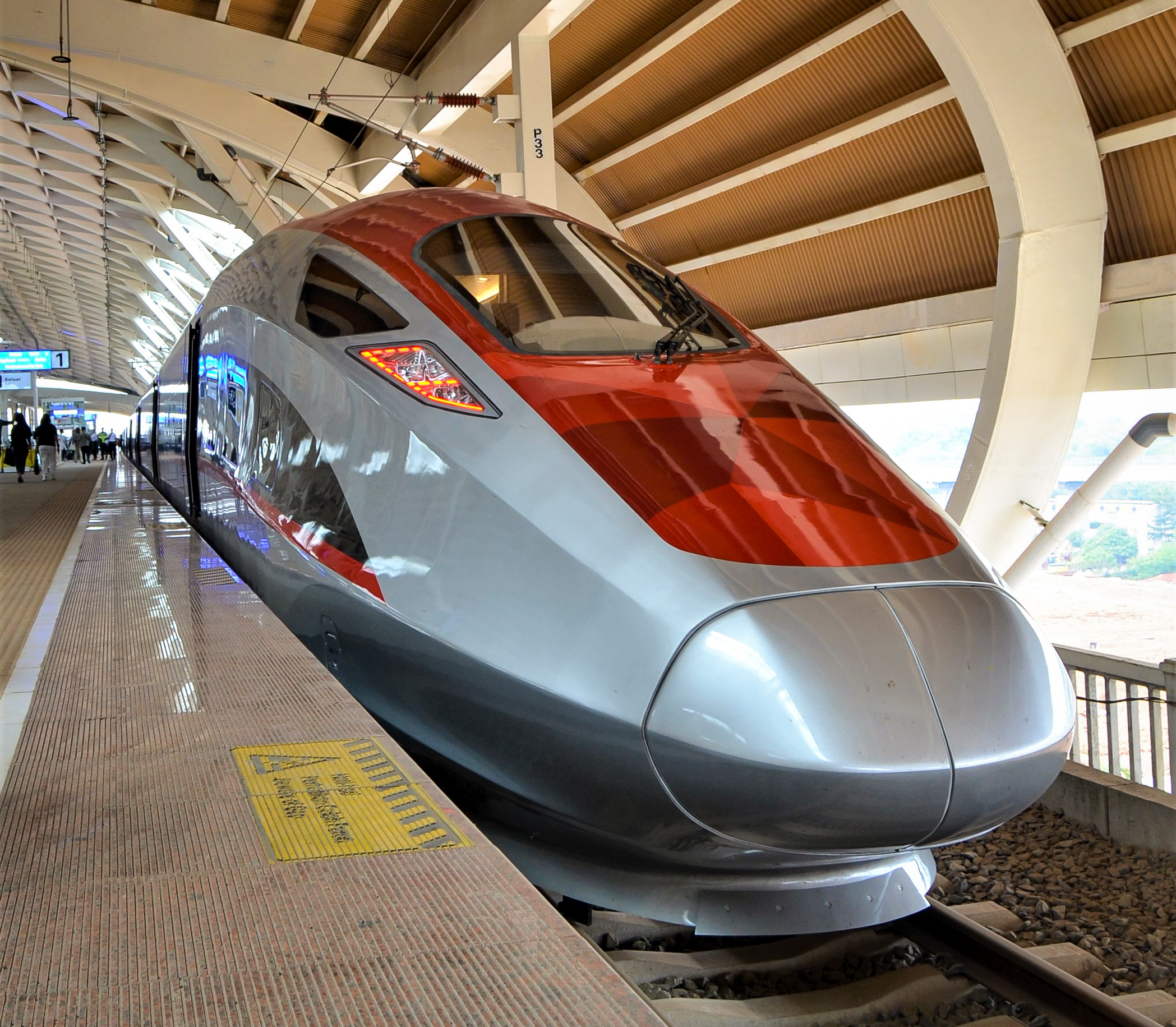
KCIC400AF at Halim station

Exported to Indonesia, the KCIC400AF and KCIC400AF-CIT are derivatives of the CR400AF manufactured for Jakarta–Bandung high speed line.
CR400AF–A
The CR400AF-A is a16-car version of the standard CR400AF locomotive, manufactured by CRRC Qingdao Sifang. The first CR400AF-A started operation in July 2018 on the Beijing–Shanghai high-speed railway. These sets are 415 m (1,361 ft 7 in) long and have a passenger capacity of 1,193 passengers. 77 sets have been manufactured. This model is no longer in production.

CR400AF–B
17-car version of the standard CR400AF manufactured by CRRC Qingdao Sifang. Testing of this locomotive started in 2018 and entered passenger service in 2019 in response to high passenger demand on the Beijing–Shanghai high-speed railway. These sets are 440 m (1,443 ft 7 in) and have a passenger capacity of 1,283 people. 13 sets were manufactured before this model went out of production.
CR400AF–C
8-car ATO enabled version of the standard CR400 locomotive with a redesigned interior and exterior. This locomotive is manufactured by CRRC Qingdao Sifang. 3 sets have been manufactured, including one that was later converted into a CR400AF–Z. This model is no longer produced.

CR400AF–G
The CR400AF-G is an 8-car sandstorm and cold climate resistant locomotive. This model is manufactured by CRRC Qingdao Sifang, who have manufactured 4 sets, including one gauge-changing technology demonstrator. On the gauge-changing set, the gauge-changing bogies were replaced with regular bogies when the train entered service.

CR400AF–Z
The CR400AF-Z is an 8-car variant with redesigned and upgraded interior and exterior with its business class arranged in a 1-1 configuration rather than the typical 1-2 configuration. It is manufactured by CRRC Qingdao Sifang. This model superseded the CR400AF. 117 sets have been manufactured, excluding the set converted from CR400AF–C.

CR400AF–AZ
The 16-car CR400AF-AZ has a redesigned and upgraded interior and exterior, with business class featured in a 1-1 configuration instead of the typical 1-2 configuration. It is manufactured by CRRC Qingdao Sifang. This model superseded the CR400AF–A. 5 sets have been manufactured.

CR400AF–BZ
Similar to its predecessor model, the CR400AF-AZ, CR400AF-BZ is a 17-car variant with a redesigned and upgraded interior and exterior, with business class featured in a 1-1 configuration instead of the typical 1-2 configuration, and an additional car. It is manufactured by CRRC Qingdao Sifang. This model superseded the CR400AF–B. Only 2 sets have been manufactured.

CR400AF–S
An upgraded 8-car variant called the CR400AF-S . This variant features interior enhancements to accommodate more passengers. It is manufactured by CRRC Qingdao Sifang. This model superseded the CR400AF–Z. 209 sets have been manufactured.

CR400AF–AS
An upgraded 16-car variant called the CR400AF-AS . This variant features interior enhancements to accommodate more passengers and a new seating class called Premium First Class, which is intermediate between First Class and Business Class. It is manufactured by CRRC Qingdao Sifang. This model superseded the CR400AF–AZ. 32 sets have been manufactured.

CR400AF–BS
An upgraded 17-car variant called the CR400AF-BS was introduced in April 2024 for use on the Beijing–Shanghai high speed railway from 15 June 2024. This variant features interior enhancements to accommodate more passengers and a new seating class called Premium First Class, which is intermediate between First Class and Business Class. It is manufactured by CRRC Qingdao Sifang. This model superseded the CR400AF–BZ. 5 sets have been manufactured.

CR400AF–AE
The CR400AF-AE is a 16-car sleeper variant of the CR with redesigned and upgraded interior and exterior. It only operates on the Beijing West/Shanghai-Hongqiao to Hong Kong West Kowloon High Speed Sleeper Train Service. CR400AF-AE is manufactured by CRRC Qingdao Sifang. Notably, this is the first sleeper train in the world to be capable of reaching 350 km/h (217.5 mph). 5 sets have been manufactured.

=== CR400BF Series ===
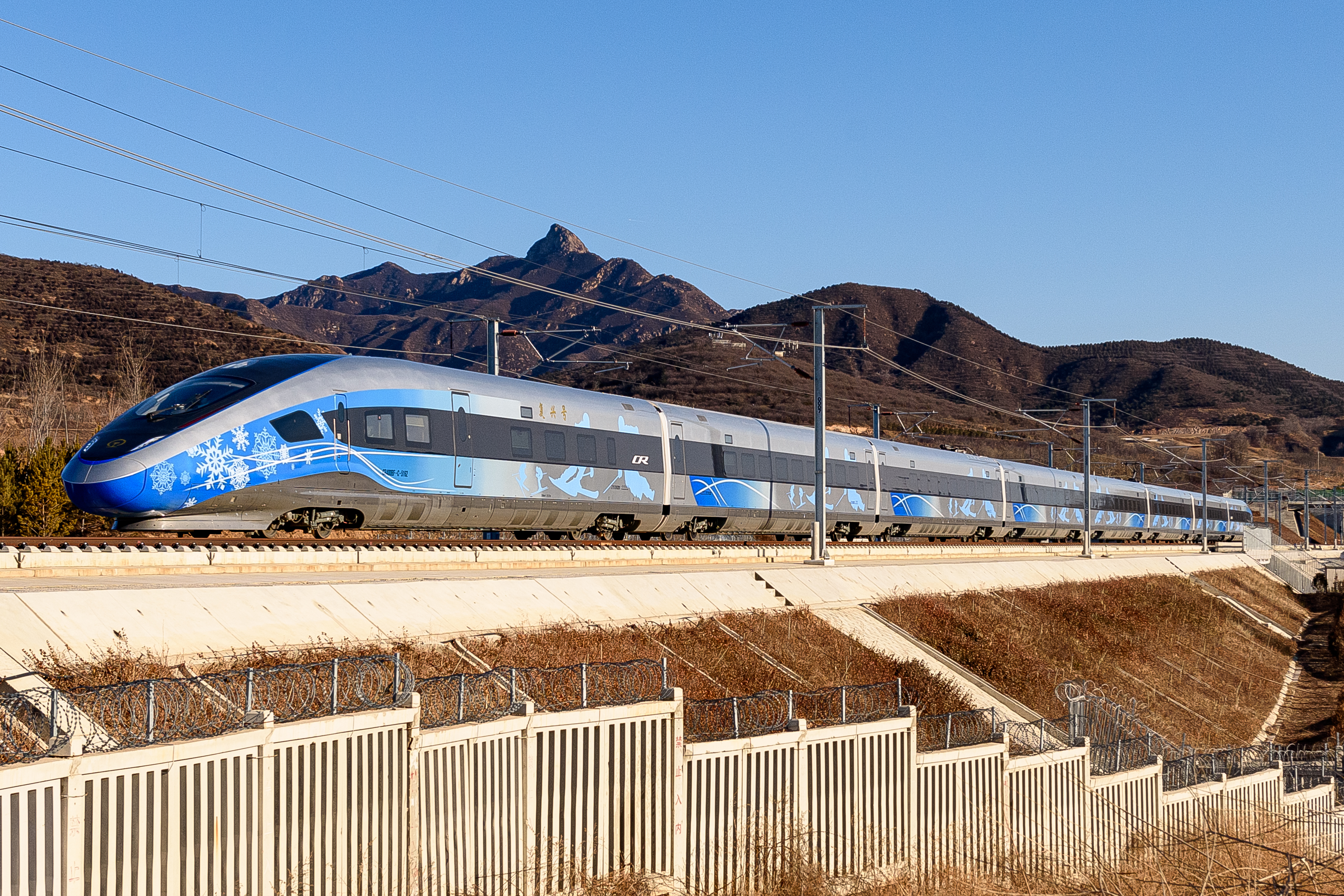
CR400BF-C with new temporary livery for the 2022 Winter Olympics

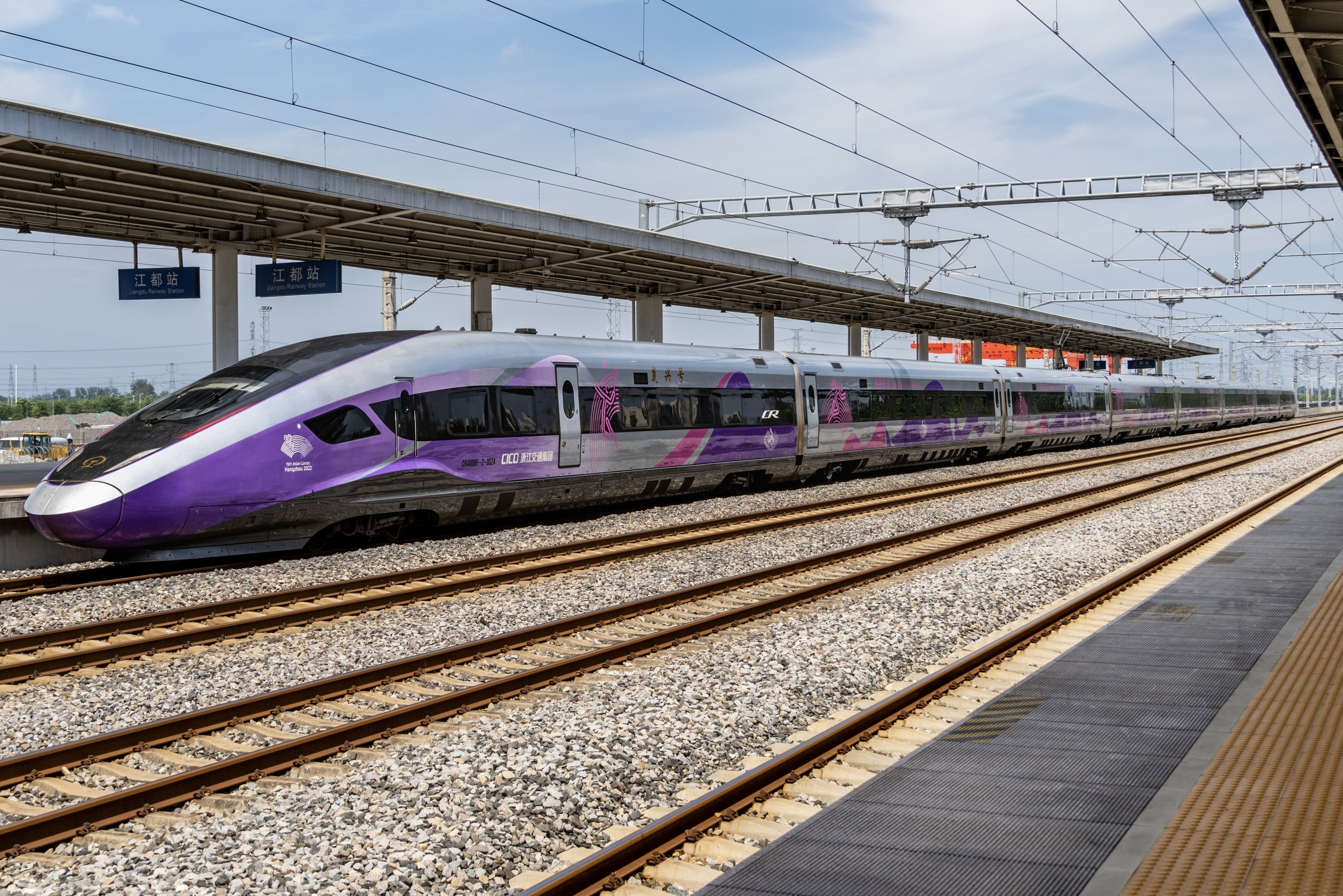
CR400BF-Z with livery for the 2022 Asian Games

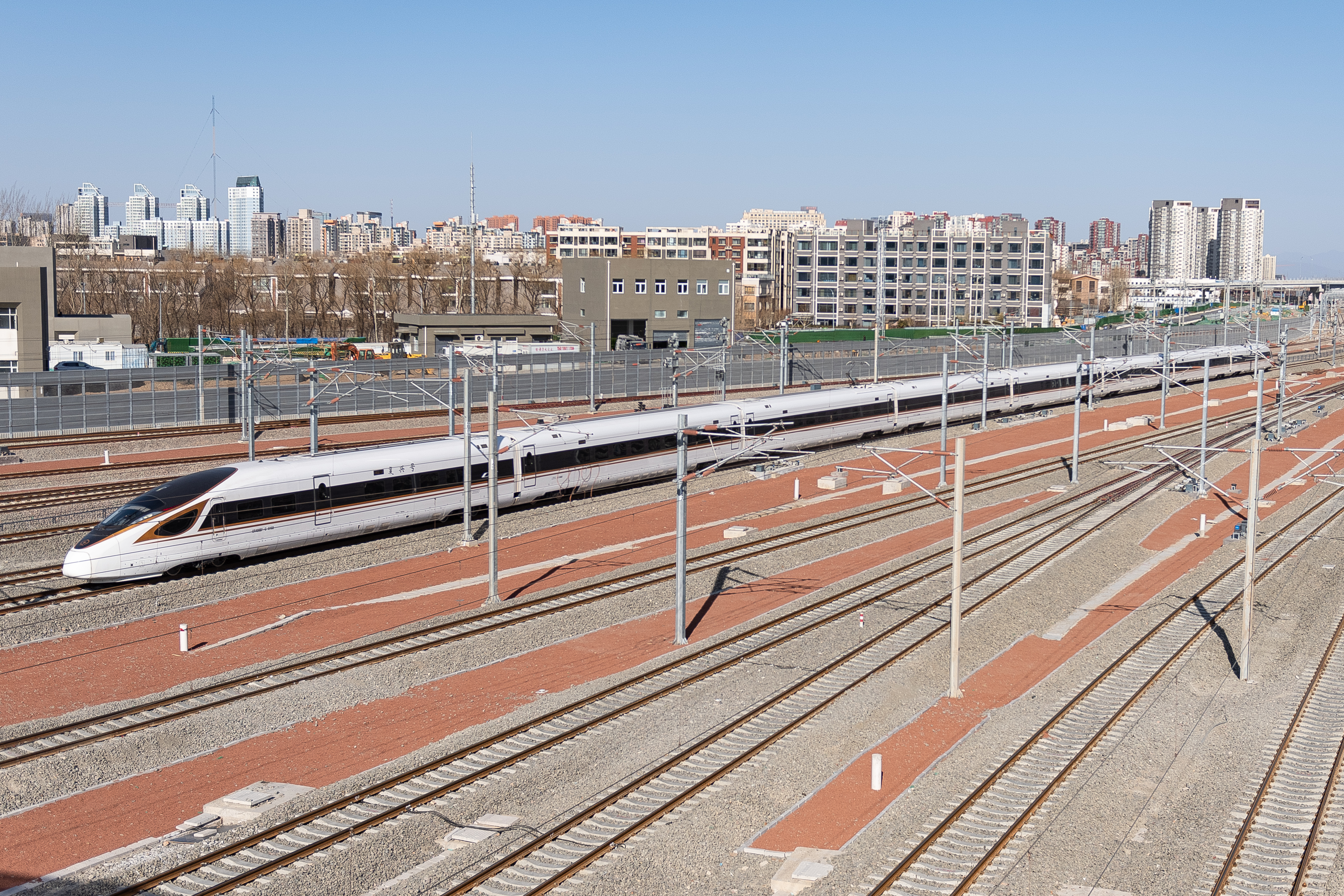
CR400BF-G at Beijing Chaoyang railway station

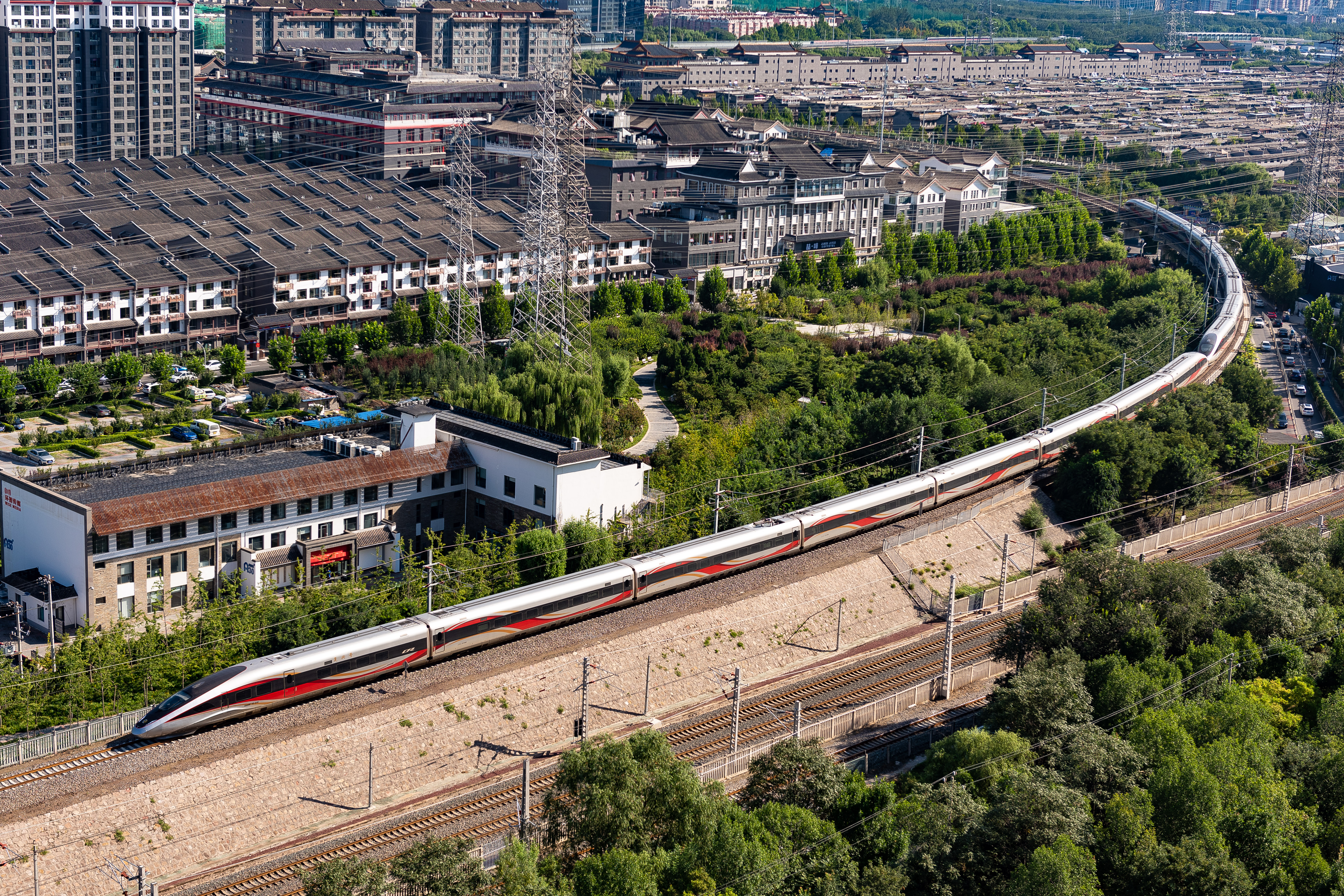
CR400BF-GZ approaching Beijing East railway station

CR400BF
The CR400BF is a 8-car standard production model CR train with a standard maximum speed of 420 km/h (260 mph). It is manufactured by CRRC Changchun Railway Vehicles.

CR400BF–A
A 16-car version called the CR400BF-A, manufactured by CRRC Changchun Railway Vehicles. Testing of this variant started on 9 March 2018. The first CR400BF-A started operation of the Beijing–Shanghai high-speed railway on 29 June 2018. These sets are 415 m (1,361 ft 7 in) and have a passenger capacity of 1,193 people.

CR400BF–B
A 17-car version called the CR400BF-B. This train is manufactured by CRRC Changchun Railway Vehicles.

CR400BF–C
The CR400BF-C is an 8-car ATO enabled CR train with a redesigned interior and exterior used on the Beijing–Zhangjiakou intercity railway in preparation for the 2022 Winter Olympics. It is manufactured by CRRC Changchun Railway Vehicles. The interior design incorporates snow and ice elements with blue ambient lighting. The train is also equipped with high-definition LED destination displays, wireless charging for business class seats, and smart glass windows. Additional features include snowboard storage and urine sampling areas. These trains are manufactured by CRRC Changchun Railway Vehicles. CR400BF–C started operating on 30 December 2019, with the opening of the Beijing–Zhangjiakou ICR.

CR400BF–G
The CR400BF-G is an 8-car sandstorm and cold climate resistant train for use in extreme weather. It is manufactured by CRRC Changchun Railway Vehicles. The CR400BG-G shares the same exterior style as the CR400BF.

CR400BF–Z
An 8-car variant called the CR400BF-Z with a redesigned and upgraded interior and exterior with business class featured in a 1-1 configuration and sliding doors. It is manufactured by CRRC Changchun Railway Vehicles.

CR400BF–AZ
The CR400BF-AZ is a 16-car train with redesigned and upgraded interior and exterior with business class featured in a 1-1 configuration instead of the typical 1-2 configuration, with sliding doors. It is manufactured by CRRC Changchun Railway Vehicles.

CR400BF–BZ
A 17-car variant called the CR400BF-BZ with a redesigned and upgraded interior and exterior with business class featured in a 1-1 configuration and sliding doors. It is manufactured by CRRC Changchun Railway Vehicles.

CR400BF–GZ
The CR400BF-GZ is an 8-car sandstorm/cold resistant train with redesigned interior and exterior, manufactured by CRRC Changchun Railway Vehicles.

CR400BF–S
An upgraded 8-car variant called the CR400BF-S. This variant features interior enhancements to accommodate more passengers and is manufactured by CRRC Changchun Railway Vehicles.

CR400BF–AS
An upgraded 16-car variant called the CR400BF-AS. This variant features interior enhancements to accommodate more passengers and a new seating class called Premium First Class, which is intermediate between First Class and Business Class. It is manufactured by CRRC Changchun Railway Vehicles.

CR400BF–BS
The upgraded 17-car CR400BF-BS was introduced in April 2024 for use on the Beijing–Shanghai high speed railway from 15 June 2024. Similar to the CR400BF-BS, this variant features interior enhancements to accommodate more passengers and a new seating class called Premium First Class, which is intermediate between First Class and Business Class. It is manufactured by CRRC Changchun Railway Vehicles.

CR400BF–GS
An upgraded 8-car sandstorm/cold resistant variant called the CR400BF-GS. This variant features interior enhancements to accommodate more passengers. It is manufactured by CRRC Changchun Railway Vehicles.

=== Other Series ===
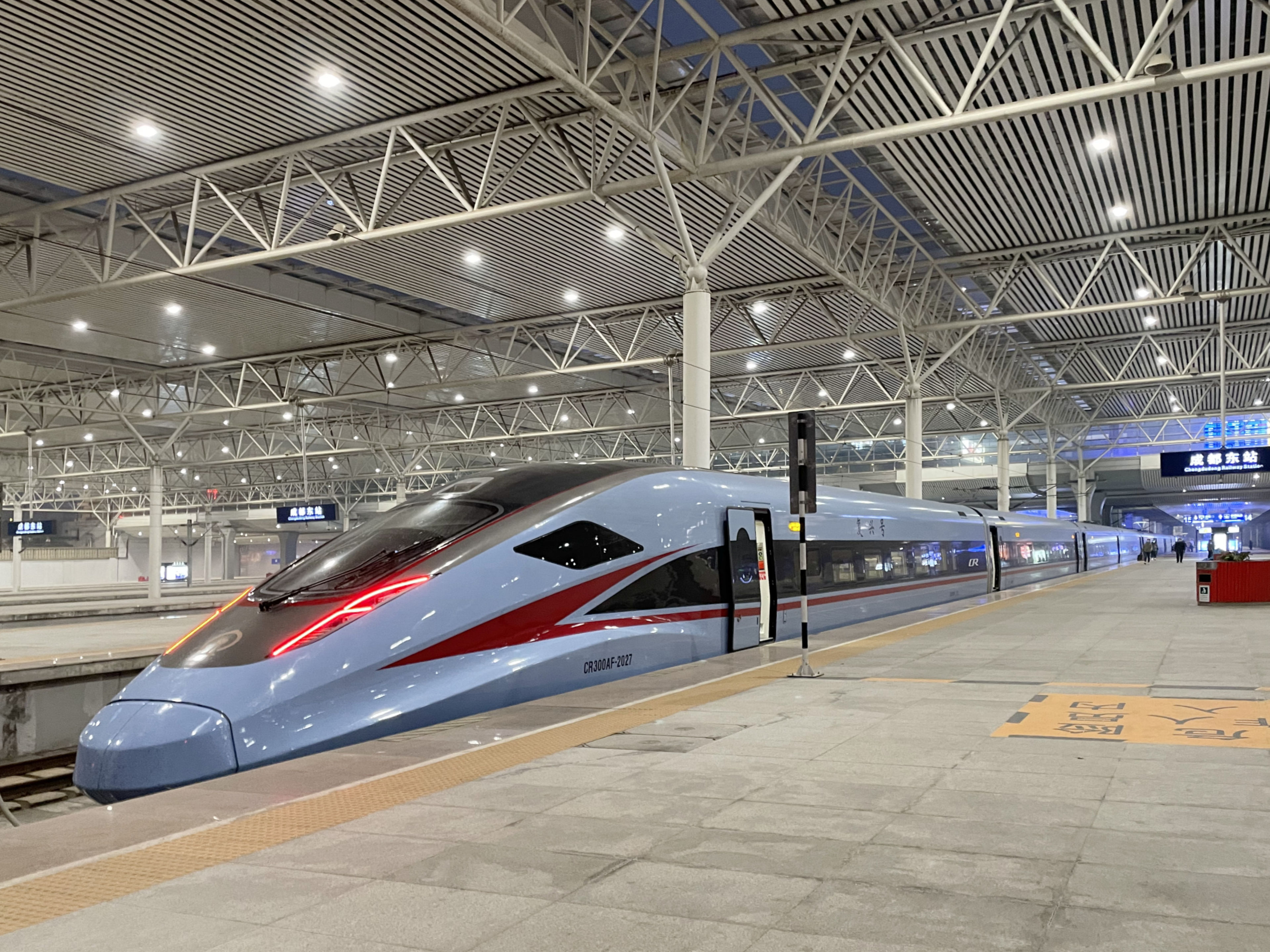
CR300AF at Chengdu East railway station

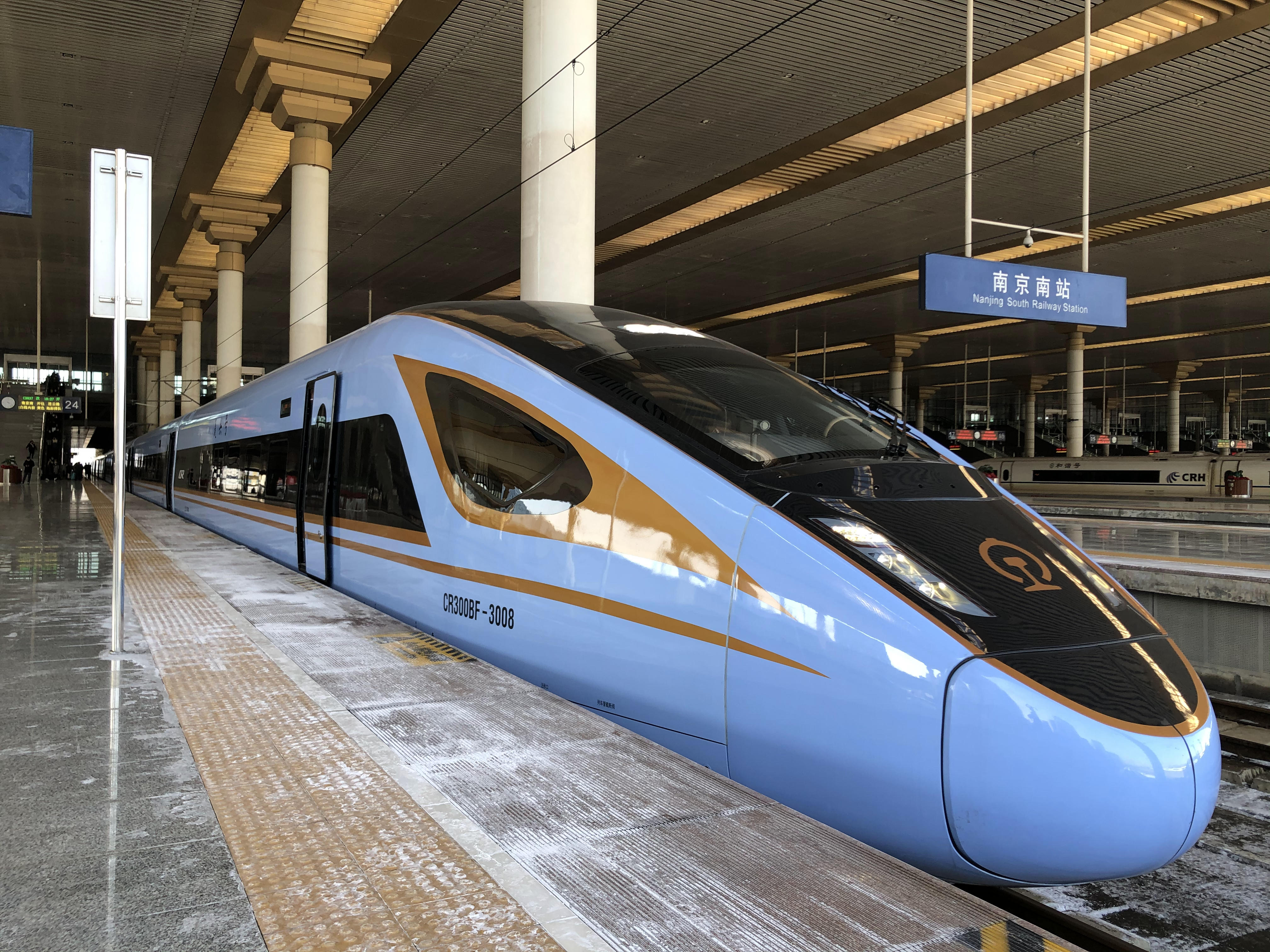
CR300BF at Nanjing South railway station

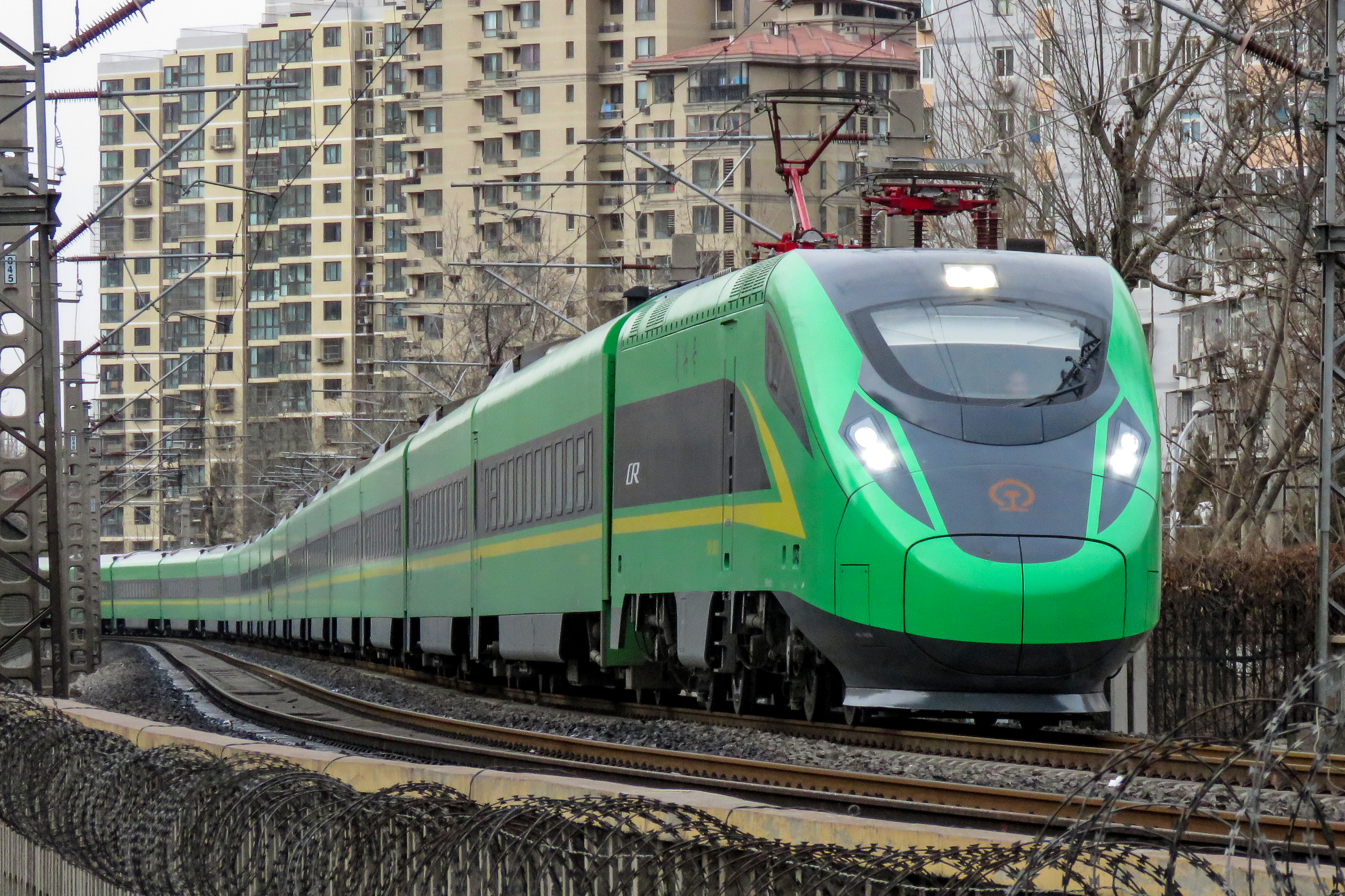
CR200J on Beijing–Shanghai railway

CR300AF
Introduced in 2018, the CR300AF with a record speed of 300 km/h (190 mph) and a service speed of 250 km/h (155 mph). It is manufactured by CRRC Qingdao Sifang.

CR300BF
Introduced in 2018, the CR300BF has a standard maximum speed of 300 km/h (190 mph) and a running speed of 250 km/h (155 mph). It is manufactured by CRRC Changchun Railway Vehicles.

CR200J
Introduced in 2019, the CR200J has a high speed of 210 km/h (130 mph) and a service speed of 160 km/h (100 mph). The CR200J was designed together by CRRC Nanjing Puzhen, CRRC Qingdao Sifang, CRRC Tangshan, CRRC Zhuzhou Locomotive, CRRC Datong and CRRC Dalian.

== Upcoming models ==
The CR450 is a Fuxing train series currently under development. As of 2023, it has not yet been put into commercial operations but according to Zhao Hongwei, chief researcher of the China Academy of Railway Sciences, the train's general design is expected to be finalized in 2024. The model is being produced from the China Railway 450 Technology Innovation Project, that was started by Beijing with the purpose to develop the next generation of high-speed trains, and part of China's fourteenth five-year plan between 2021 and 2025. The prototypes of the CR450's two models, the CR450AF and the CR450BF, were unveiled in 2024.

The train encompasses nine new independently developed technologies that includes carbon ceramic braking, pantograph active control, eddy current braking, and permanent magnet traction systems. Since April 2023, the new model has undertaken over 60 tests to evaluate its dynamics when running on tracks and going through tunnels, and as well as train meet scenarios, where two trains pass each other while moving in opposite directions. In June 2023, a CR450 sped at 453 km/h (281 mph) during a test run that travels through the Meizhou Bay cross-sea bridge, and its relative velocity had reached 891 km/h (554 mph), which set a new world record for the fastest closing speed among two trains passing each other.

It is expected to enter service by 2025 with a top operating speed of 400 km/h (249 mph), surpassing the current fastest operating speeds of other high-speed trains in China.

== Specification ==
Train type	Car dimensions	Total length	Top speed	Seating capacity	Formation	Power output (under 25 kV)	Entry into Service
CR400AF/AF–A/AF–B
CR400AF	End cars length: 27.91 m (91 ft 7 in); Inter cars length: 25.65 m (84 ft 2 in); Width: 3.36 m (11 ft 0 in); Height: 4.05 m (13 ft 3 in)	Calculated: 209.72 m (688 ft 1 in); Real: 209 m (685 ft 8 in)	Test: 420 km/h (261 mph); Design: 400 km/h (249 mph); Continuous operation: 400 km/h (249 mph); Current operation: 350 km/h (217 mph)	556: 10 business, 28 first and 518 standard 576: 10 business, 28 first and 538 standard 392: 10 business, 24 first and 358 standard	4M4T	10.4 MW (13,947 hp)	15 August 2016
CR400AF–A	End cars length: 27.91 m (91 ft 7 in); Inter cars length: 25.65 m (84 ft 2 in); Width: 3.36 m (11 ft 0 in); Height: 4.05 m (13 ft 3 in)	Calculated: 414.92 m (1,361 ft 3 in); Real: 414 m (1,358 ft 3 in)	Test: 420 km/h (261 mph); Design: 400 km/h (249 mph); Continuous operation: 400 km/h (249 mph); Current operation: 350 km/h (217 mph)	1193: 22 business, 148 first and 1023 standard	8M8T	19.2 MW (25,748 hp)	16 June 2018
CR400AF–B	End cars length: 27.91 m (91 ft 7 in); Inter cars length: 25.65 m (84 ft 2 in); Width: 3.36 m (11 ft 0 in); Height: 4.05 m (13 ft 3 in)	Calculated: 438.928 m (1,440 ft 0.6 in); Real: 439.8 m (1,442 ft 11 in)	Test: 420 km/h (261 mph); Design: 400 km/h (249 mph); Continuous operation: 400 km/h (249 mph); Current operation: 350 km/h (217 mph)	1283: 22 business, 148 first and 1113 standard	8M9T	19.2 MW (25,748 hp)	5 January 2019
CR400BF/BF–A/BF–B/BF–C/BF–E/BF–G
CR400BF	End cars length: 27.089 m (88 ft 10.5 in); Inter cars length: 25.65 m (84 ft 2 in); Width: 3.36 m (11 ft 0 in); Height: 4.05 m (13 ft 3 in)	Calculated: 208.078 m (682 ft 8.0 in); Real: 209 m (685 ft 8 in)	Test: 420 km/h (261 mph); Design: 400 km/h (249 mph); Continuous operation: 400 km/h (249 mph); Current operation: 350 km/h (217 mph)	556: 10 business, 28 first and 518 standard 576: 10 business, 28 first and 538 standard	4M4T	10.14 MW (13,598 hp)	15 August 2016
CR400BF–C	End cars length: 27.089 m (88 ft 10.5 in); Inter cars length: 25.65 m (84 ft 2 in); Width: 3.36 m (11 ft 0 in); Height: 4.05 m (13 ft 3 in)	Calculated: 208.078 m (682 ft 8.0 in); Real: 209 m (685 ft 8 in)	Test: 420 km/h (261 mph); Design: 400 km/h (249 mph); Continuous operation: 400 km/h (249 mph); Current operation: 350 km/h (217 mph)	576: 10 business, 28 first and 538 standard 541: 10 business, 28 first and 503 standard	4M4T	10.14 MW (13,598 hp)	30 December 2019
CR400BF–G	End cars length: 27.089 m (88 ft 10.5 in); Inter cars length: 25.65 m (84 ft 2 in); Width: 3.36 m (11 ft 0 in); Height: 4.05 m (13 ft 3 in)	Calculated: 208.078 m (682 ft 8.0 in); Real: 209 m (685 ft 8 in)	Test: 420 km/h (261 mph); Design: 400 km/h (249 mph); Continuous operation: 400 km/h (249 mph); Current operation: 350 km/h (217 mph)	576: 10 business, 28 first and 538 standard	4M4T	10.14 MW (13,598 hp)	9 June 2019
CR400BF–A	End cars length: 27.089 m (88 ft 10.5 in); Inter cars length: 25.65 m (84 ft 2 in); Width: 3.36 m (11 ft 0 in); Height: 4.05 m (13 ft 3 in)	Calculated: 413.278 m (1,355 ft 10.8 in); Real: 414 m (1,358 ft 3 in)	Test: 420 km/h (261 mph); Design: 400 km/h (249 mph); Continuous operation: 400 km/h (249 mph); Current operation: 350 km/h (217 mph)	1193: 22 business, 148 first and 1023 standard	8M8T	20.28 MW (27,196 hp)	12 June 2018
CR400BF–S	End cars length: 27.089 m (88 ft 10.5 in); Inter cars length: 25.65 m (84 ft 2 in); Width: 3.36 m (11 ft 0 in); Height: 4.05 m (13 ft 3 in)	Calculated: 413.278 m (1,355 ft 10.8 in); Real: 414 m (1,358 ft 3 in)	Test: 420 km/h (261 mph); Design: 400 km/h (249 mph); Continuous operation: 400 km/h (249 mph); Current operation: 350 km/h (217 mph)	880: 880 soft sleepers	8M8T	20.28 MW (27,196 hp)	Under testing
CR400BF–B	End cars length: 27.089 m (88 ft 10.5 in); Inter cars length: 25.65 m (84 ft 2 in); Width: 3.36 m (11 ft 0 in); Height: 4.05 m (13 ft 3 in)	Calculated: 438.928 m (1,440 ft 0.6 in); Real: 439.8 m (1,442 ft 11 in)	Test: 420 km/h (261 mph); Design: 400 km/h (249 mph); Continuous operation: 400 km/h (249 mph); Current operation: 350 km/h (217 mph)	1283: 22 business, 148 first and 1113 standard	8M9T	20.28 MW (27,196 hp)	5 January 2019
CR300
CR300AF	Power car length: Unknown	Calculated: 208.95 m (685 ft 6 in)	Test: N/A	565: 48 first, 565 standard	4M4T	TBD	2018
CR200J
CR200J (Short)	Power cars length: 20 m (65 ft 7 in); Inter cars length: 25.5 m (83 ft 8 in); Control car length: 27.955 m (91 ft 8.6 in); Width: 3.105 m (10 ft 2.2 in); Height: 4.433 m (14 ft 6.5 in)	Calculated: 226.455 m (742 ft 11.6 in); Real: 234 m (767 ft 9 in)	Test: N/A; Design: 210 km/h (130 mph); Continuous operation: 160 km/h (99 mph); Current operation: 160 km/h (99 mph)	690: 690 standard	1M7T1Tc	TBD	5 January 2019
CR200J (Long)	Power cars length: 20 m (65 ft 7 in); Inter cars length: 25.5 m (83 ft 8 in); Control car length: 27.955 m (91 ft 8.6 in); Width: 3.105 m (10 ft 2.2 in); Height: 4.433 m (14 ft 6.5 in)	Calculated: 448 m (1,469 ft 10 in); Real: 518 m (1,699 ft 6 in)	Test: N/A; Design: 210 km/h (130 mph); Continuous operation: 160 km/h (99 mph); Current operation: 160 km/h (99 mph)	918: 242 standard, 280 first class sleepers and 396 second class sleepers	2M16T	TBD	5 January 2019

== Incidents and equipment issues ==
- On 8 February 2018, a train no. G89 from Beijing West railway station to Chengdu East railway station, serviced by CR400BF-5033 (with 576 seats), was forced to discontinue its journey at Xi'an North railway station, due to a mechanical malfunction (hot box). No passengers were injured. Passengers were then transferred to a CRH380B train set with only 556 seats.
- On 27 June 2018, train no. G123 from Beijing South railway station to Shanghai Hongqiao railway station was late by 49 minutes, as it sustained an equipment failure due to an earlier service G239 which is provided by Hexie type CRH380B EMU.
- On 12 August 2018, train no. G40 from Hangzhou East railway station to Beijing South railway station collided with a flying steel plate, which was blown away from a nearby construction site close to Langfang railway station. The flying steel plates not only damaged the train itself, but caused serious traffic disruptions on the Beijing–Shanghai high-speed railway as the overhead catenary also sustained damages. Passengers were transferred to buses, while the damaged train was hauled to Beijing South railway station by a Dongfeng 11 diesel locomotive.
- On 26 September 2018 an inbound CR400BF-A trainset was unable to properly open its doors at Hong Kong West Kowloon railway station, as the platform edge reached beyond the track's structure gauge. The vehicle was redirected to a different platform. No injuries were reported.
- During the one week holiday of the National Day of the People's Republic of China (1–7 October 2018), various services of Fuxing were forced to stop at intermediate stations along their routes, as they had been immobilized by the crowd of passengers, causing traffic disruptions. Unlike Hexie, Fuxing trains are equipped with devices that are capable of detecting certain levels of overcrowding, preventing them from any further movement to ensure safety until train staff manage to remove the necessary number of passengers.
- On 17 October 2018, China Railway Shanghai Group reported that it has implemented portable air quality measurement devices to monitor the level of hazardous fumes emitted by possibly substandard heat resistant surfaces in the passenger carriages as several complaints have been recorded by passengers and train drivers, stating the smell in the carriages is unbearable. Some passengers also suffered minor respiratory diseases such as coughing and sore throat.
- On 14 October 2019, a train bound for Kaihua Station had smoke present in the machinery room of its rear locomotive. Upon discovering this, the driver immediately disconnected the main circuit breaker and took measures to slow down. Later, while running, the rear locomotive suddenly broke down in smoke, and was promptly stopped for treatment. The locomotive failure and fire were then dealt with without causing any casualties. The train later arrived at its destination, 201 minutes later than planned. The locomotive involved in the accident was newly built in December 2018, and had traveled 131,498 kilometers at the time of the accident. The specific cause of the fire was a loose wire contacting with the main control panel cabinet, causing the control panel to short circuit and catch fire. Yongji Motor later paid 80 million Yuan in compensation to the China State Railway Group.

== Gallery ==
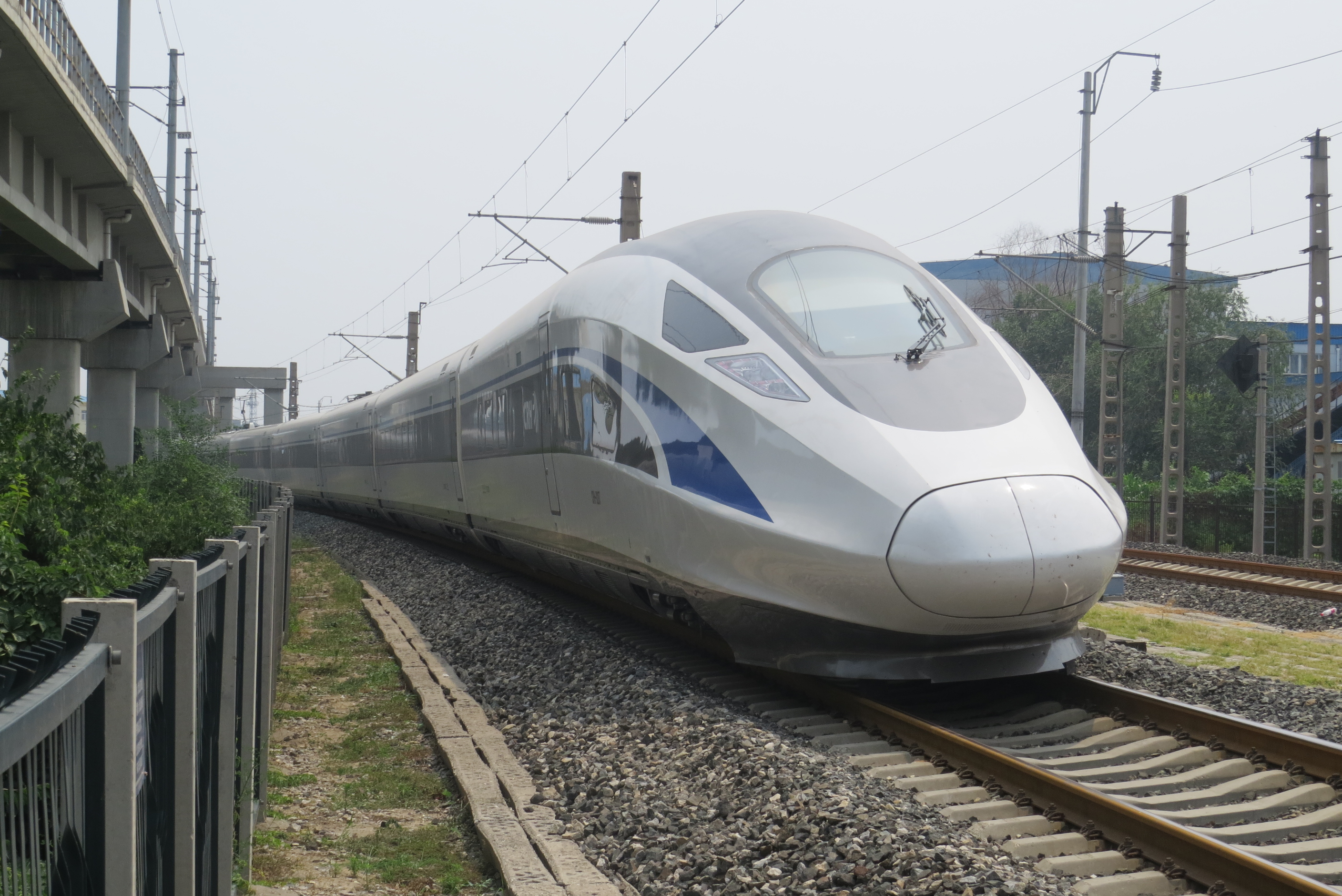
CRH-0207 testing in the National Railway Test Center, Beijing

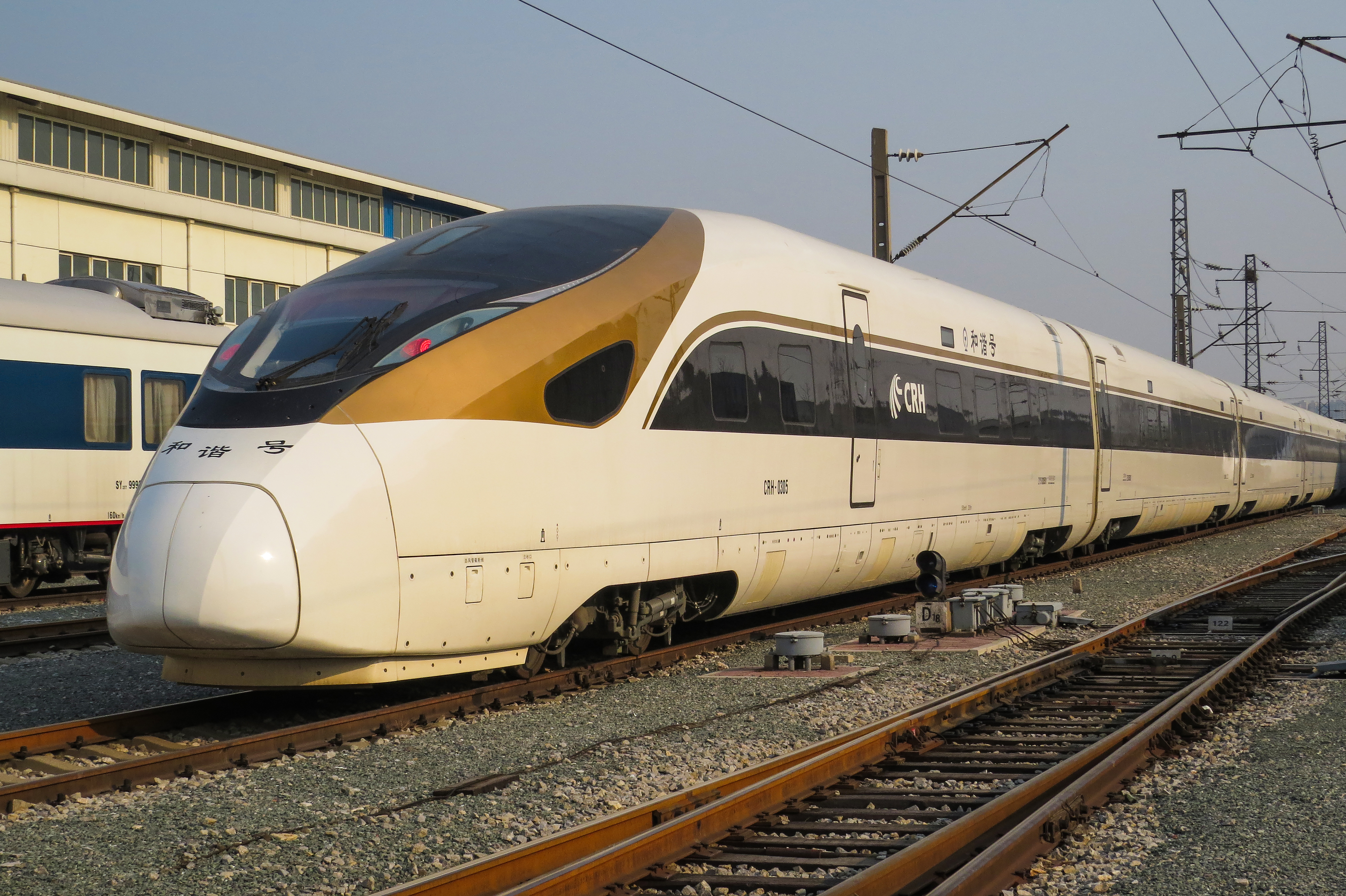
CRH-0305 at National Railway Test Center, Beijing

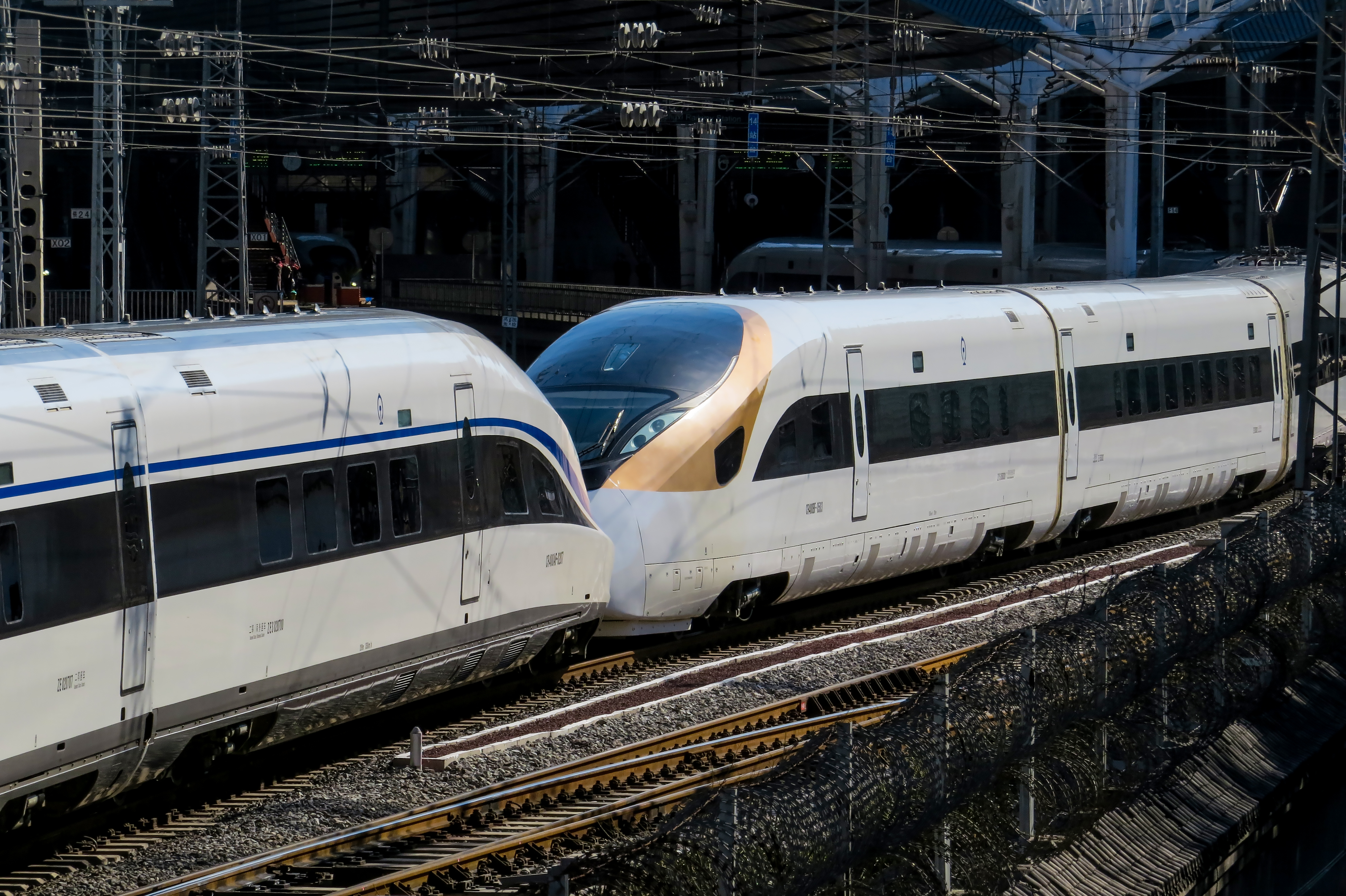
Double heading between Qingdao-built CRH-0207 and Changchun-built CRH-0503

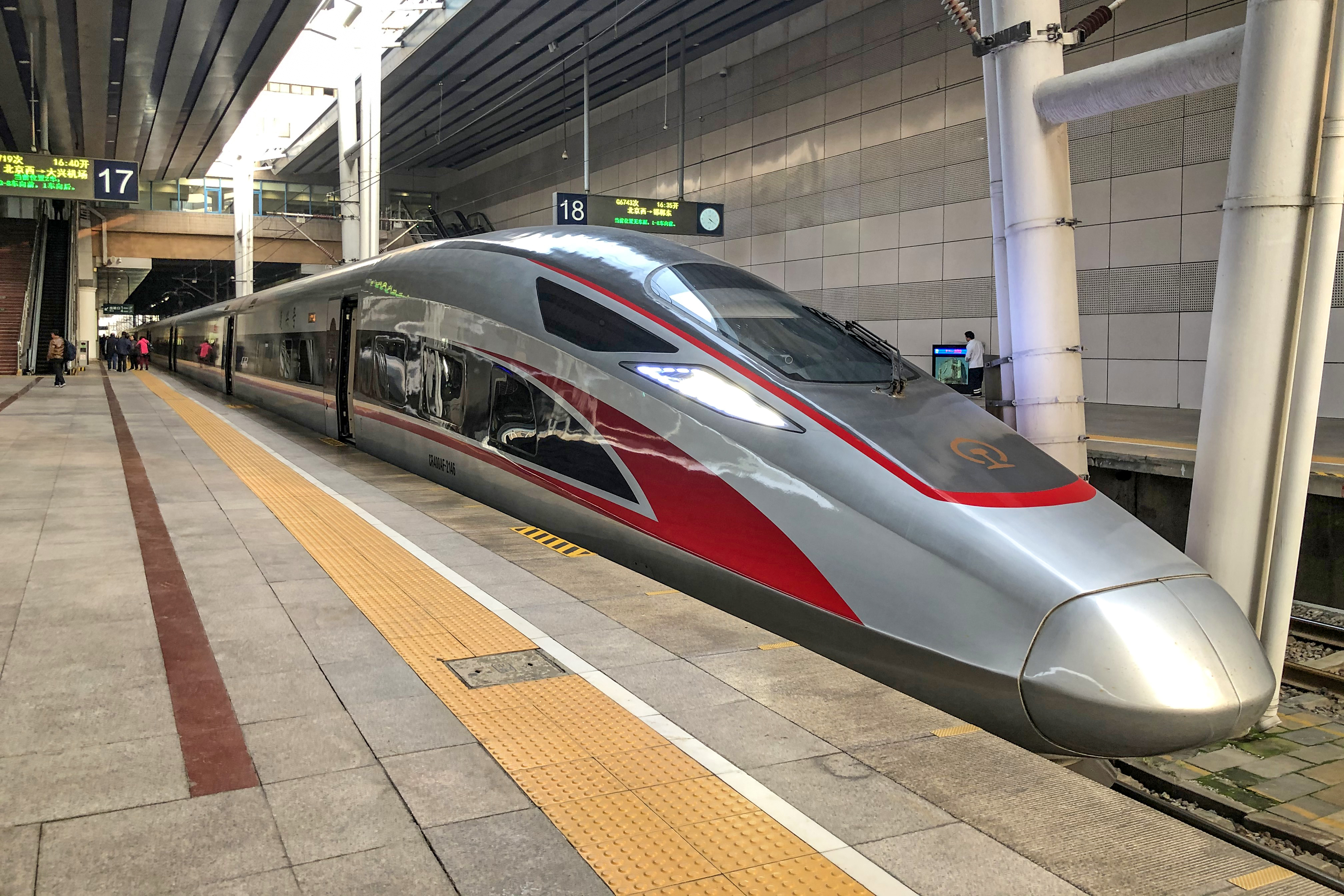
CR400AF-2146 at Beijing West railway station awaiting departure to Daxing International Airport

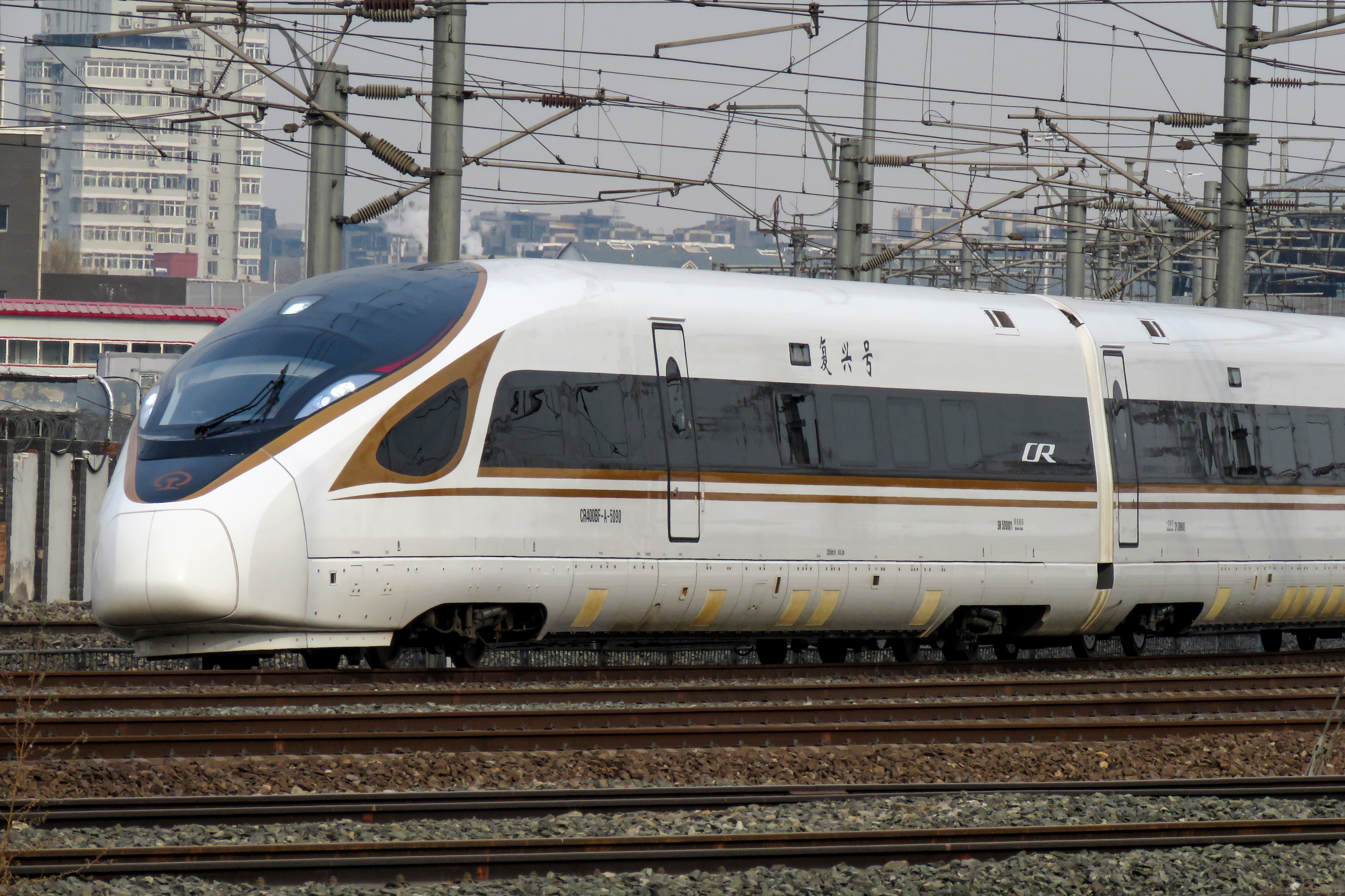
CR400BF-A to Shanghai Hongqiao railway station

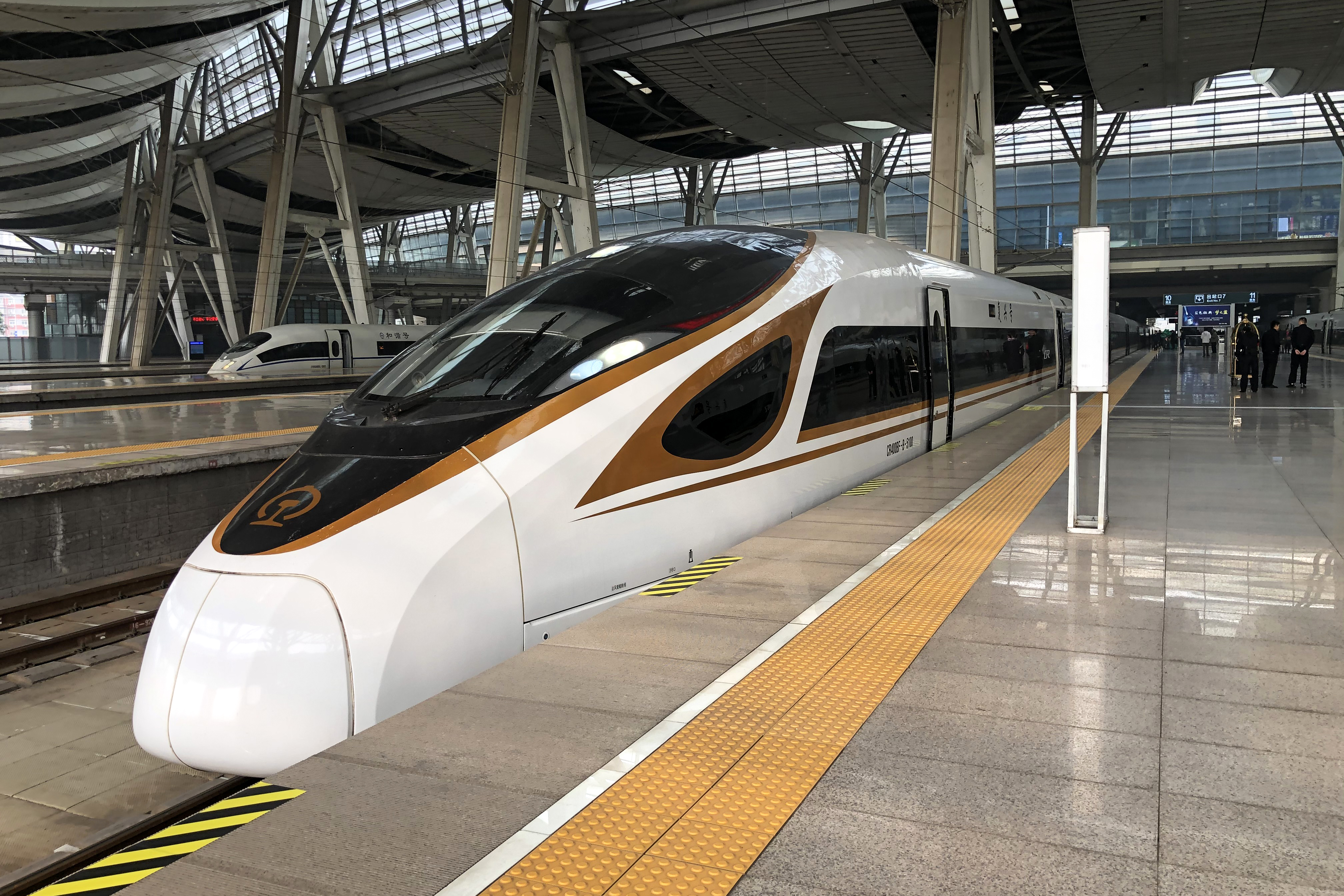
CR400BF-B departing Beijing South railway station to Shanghai Hongqiao railway station

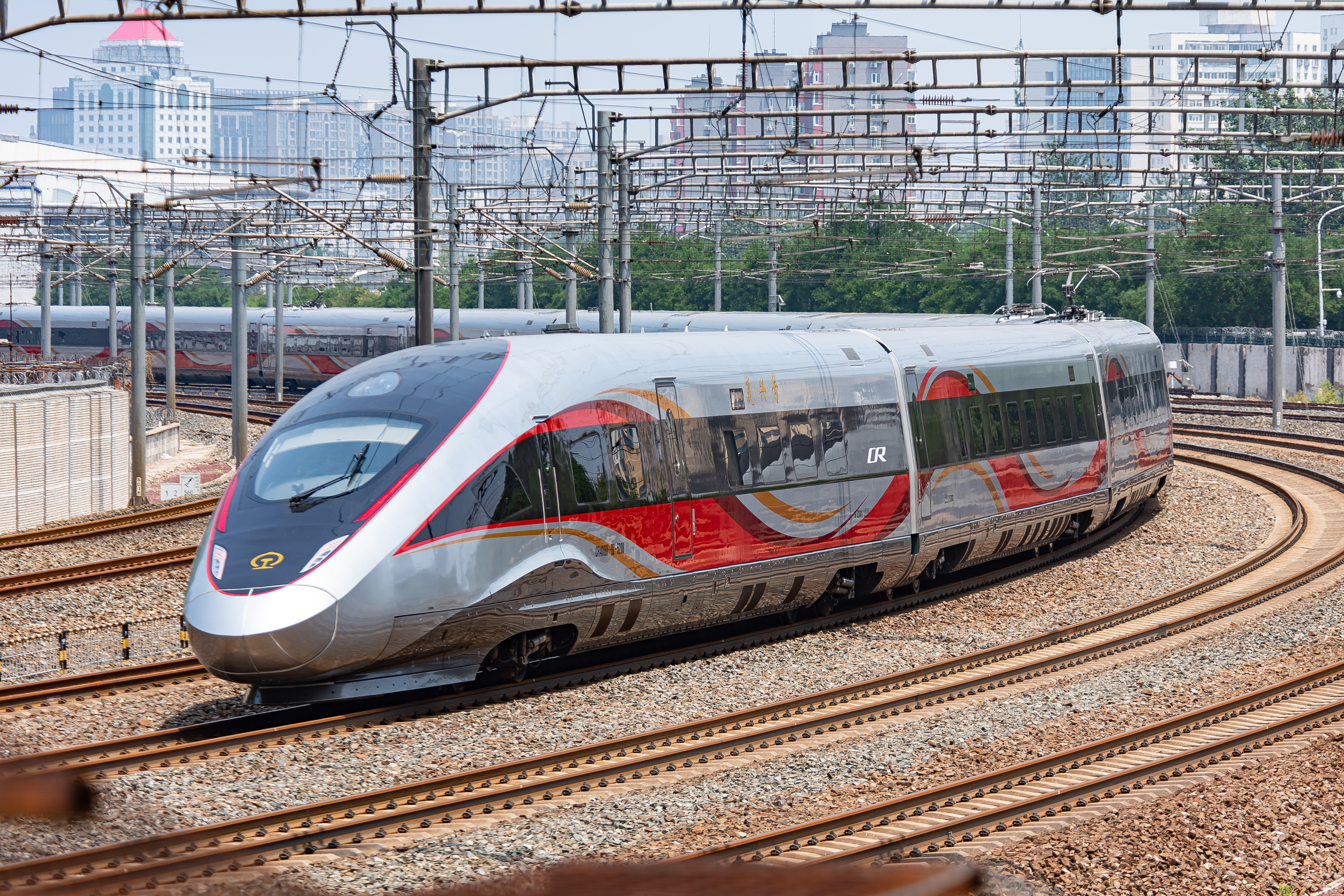
CR400BF-BZ at Beijing South railway station

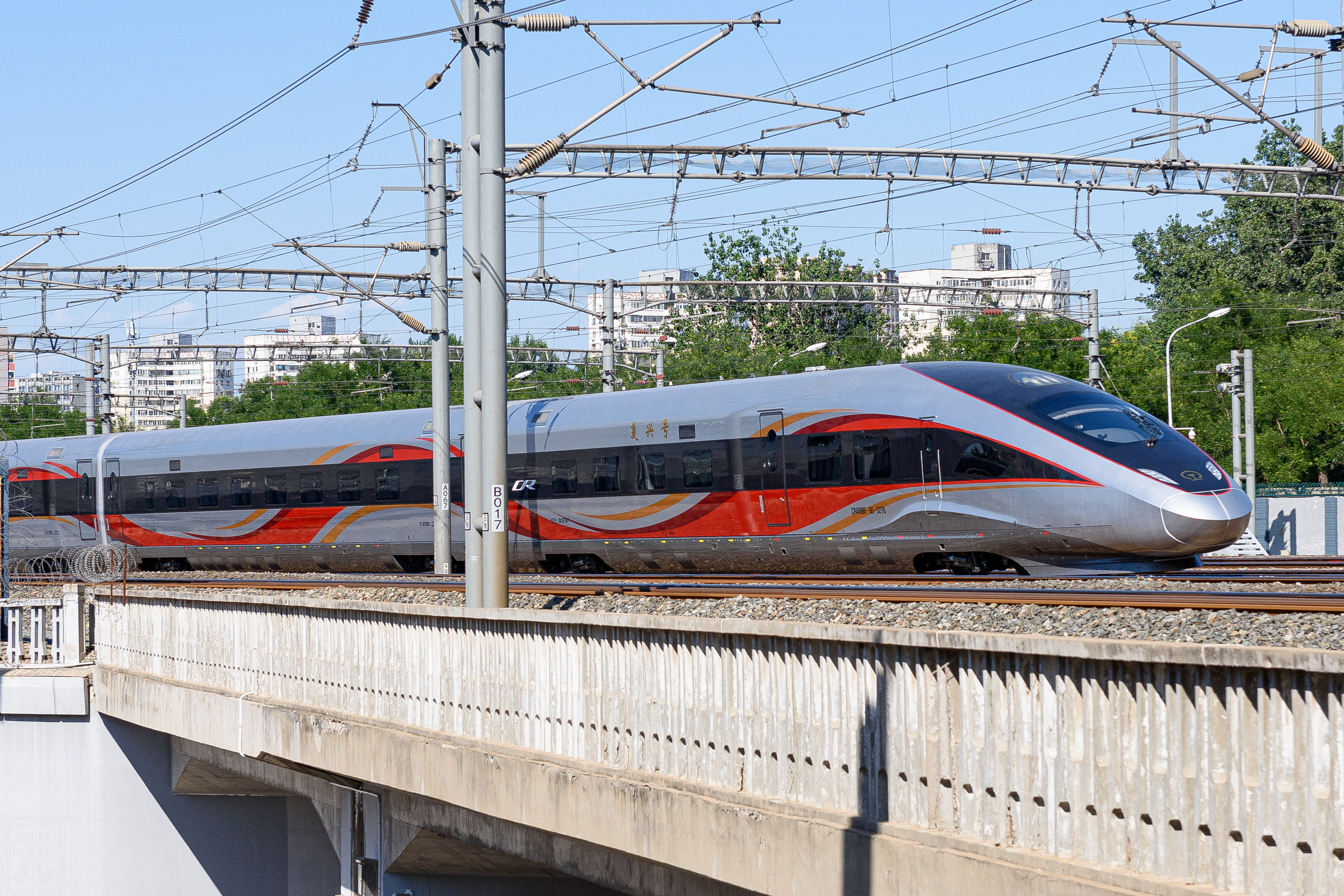
CR400BF-BS leaving Beijing South railway station

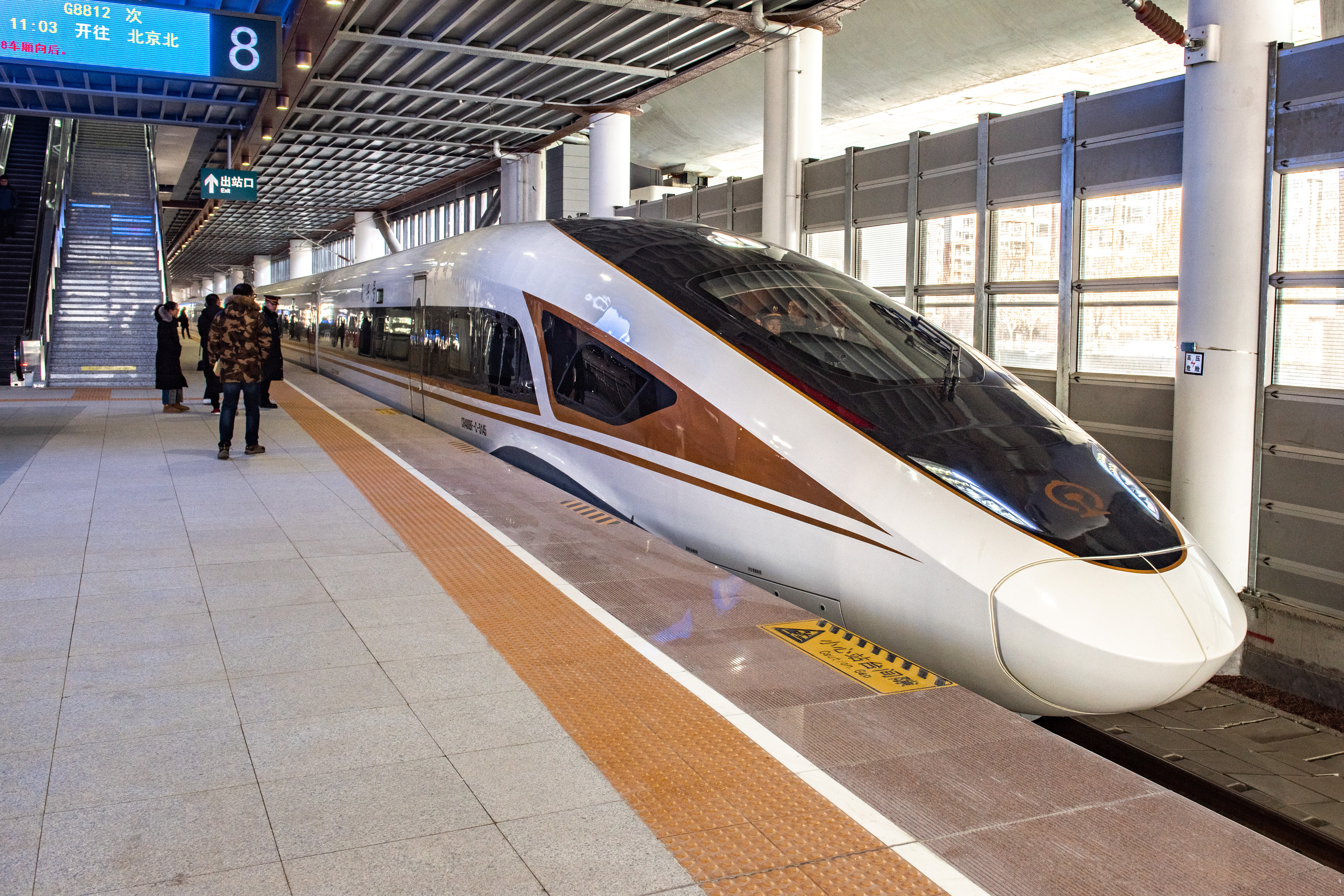
CR400BF-C at Qinghe railway station

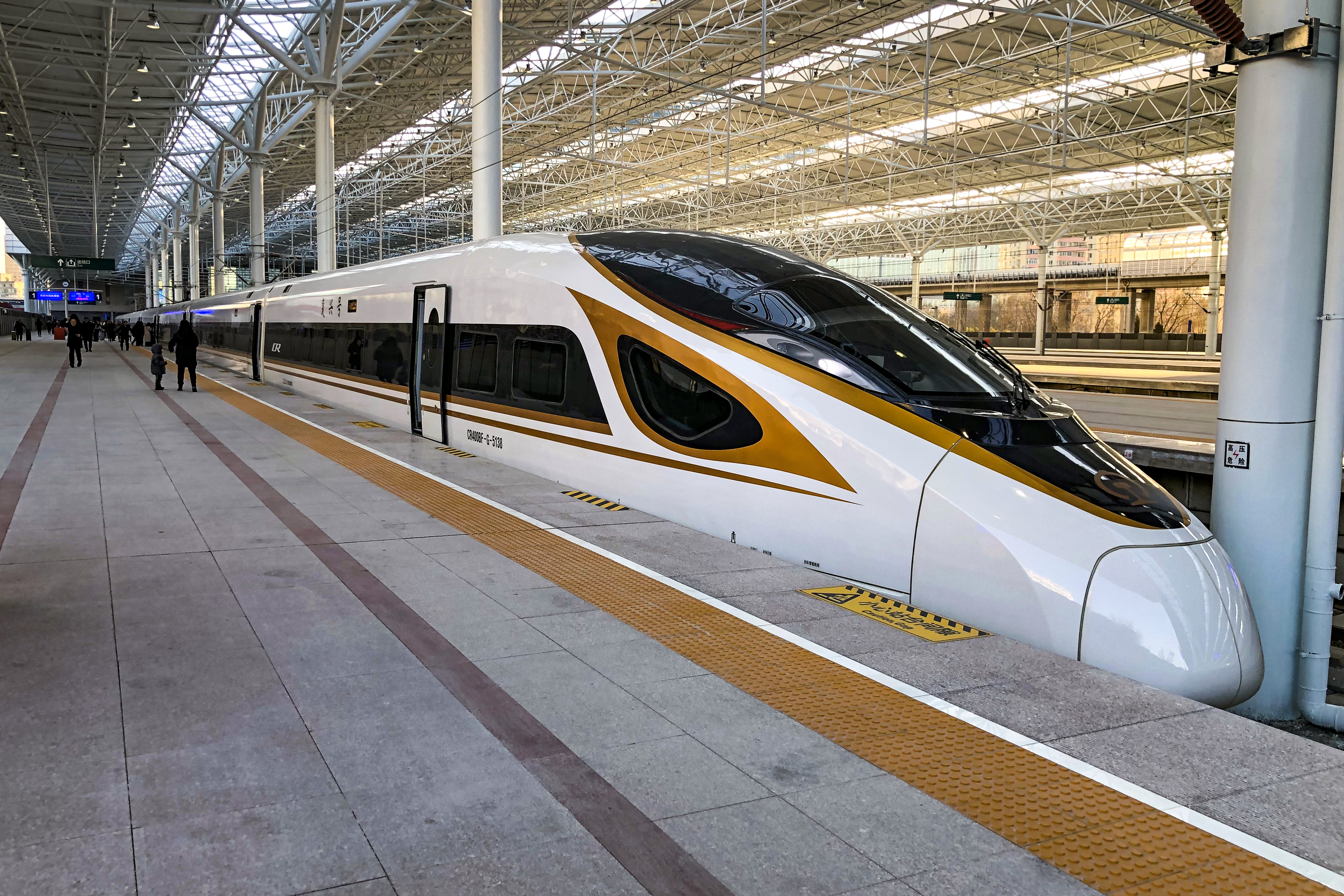
CR400BF-G at Beijing North railway station

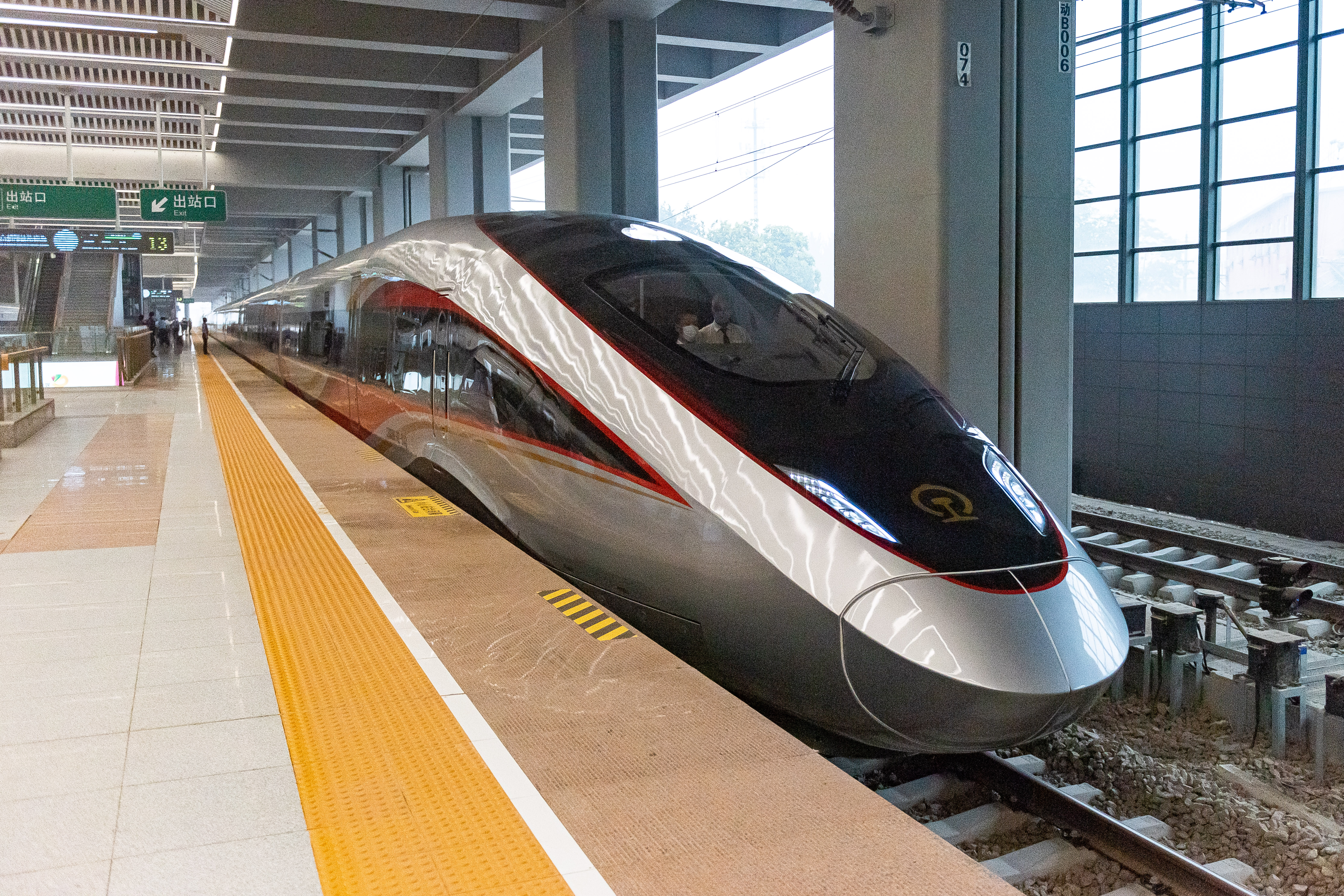
CR400BF-GZ at Beijing Chaoyang railway station

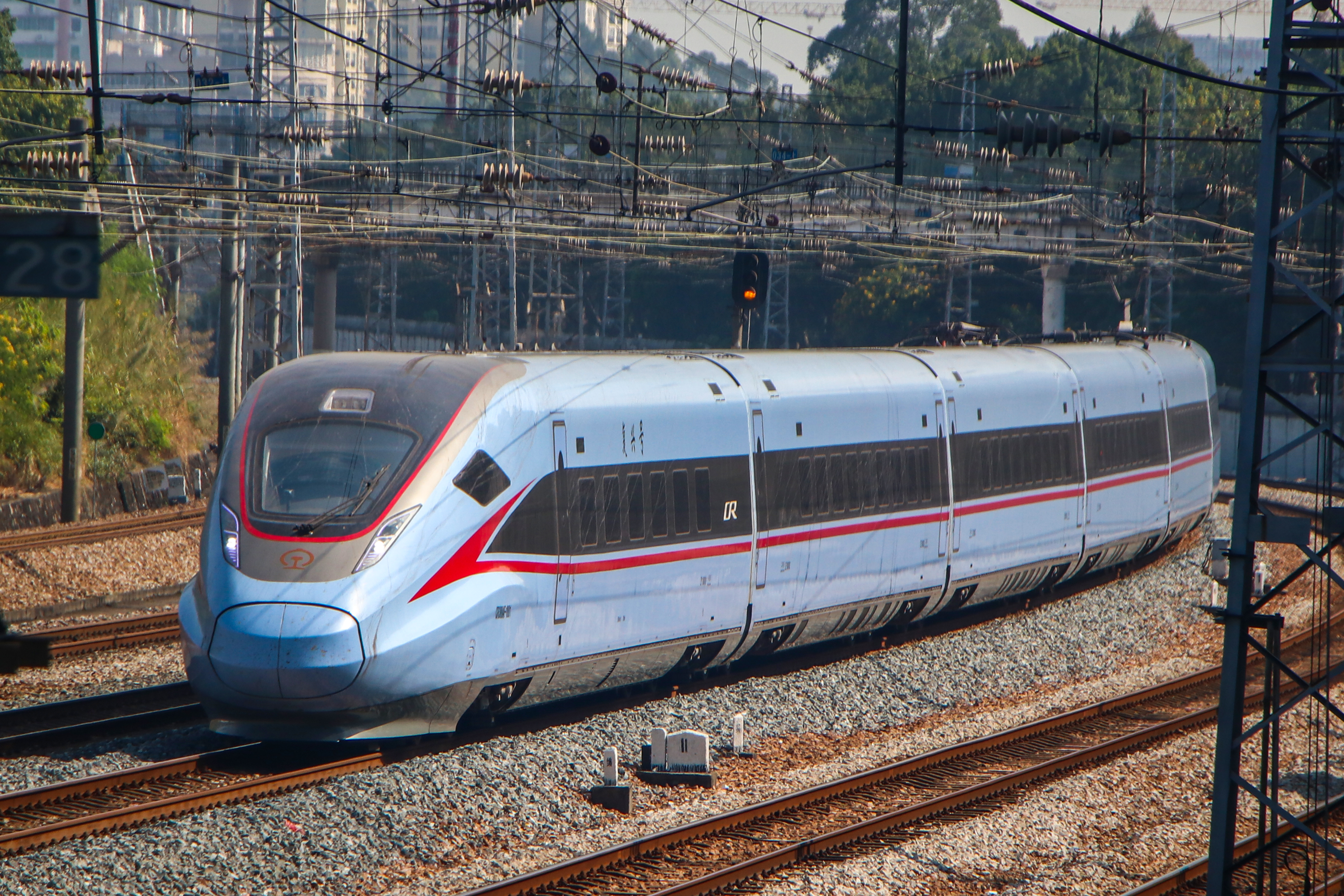
CR300AF on the Guangzhou–Shenzhen railway

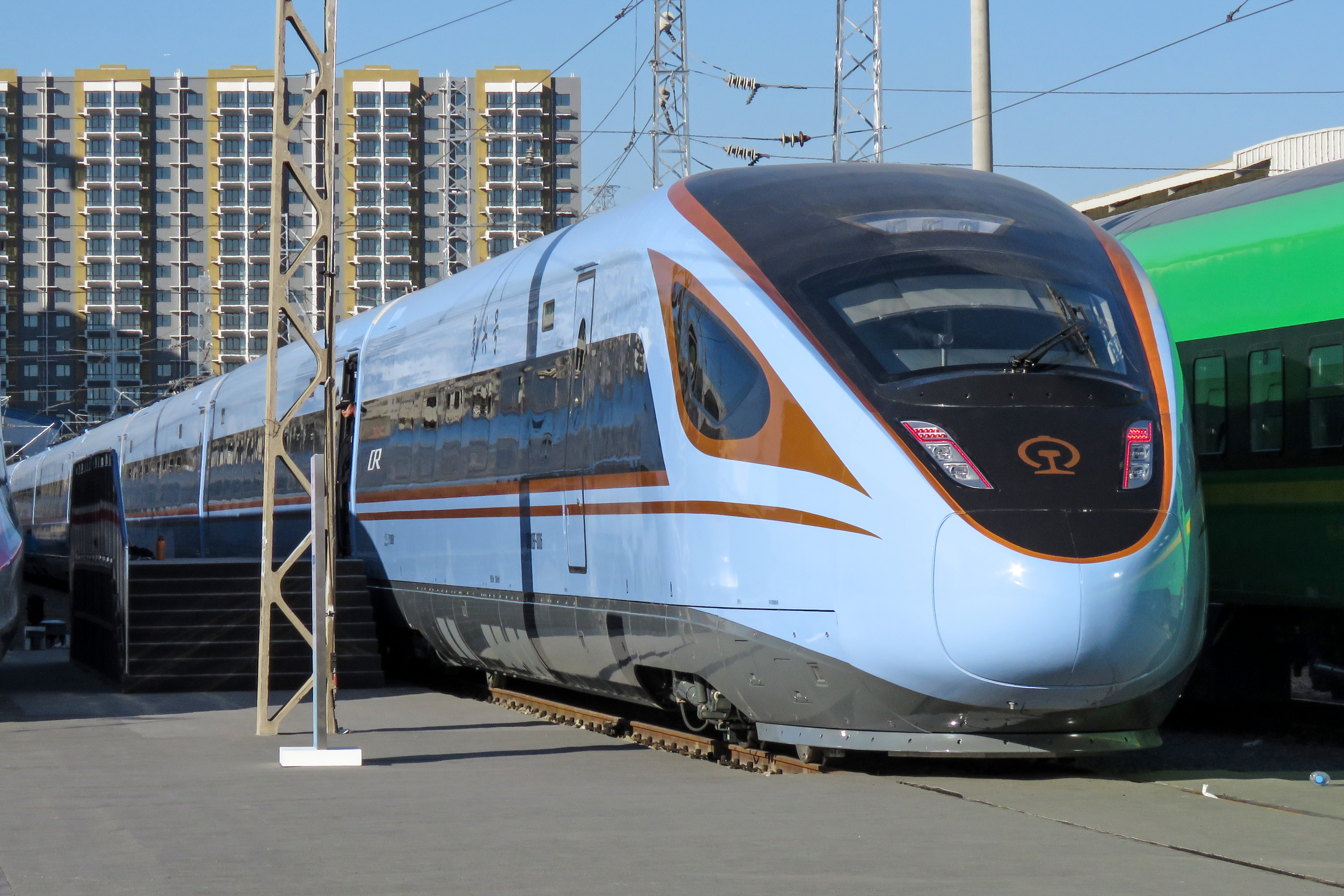
CR300BF at National Railway Test Center, Beijing

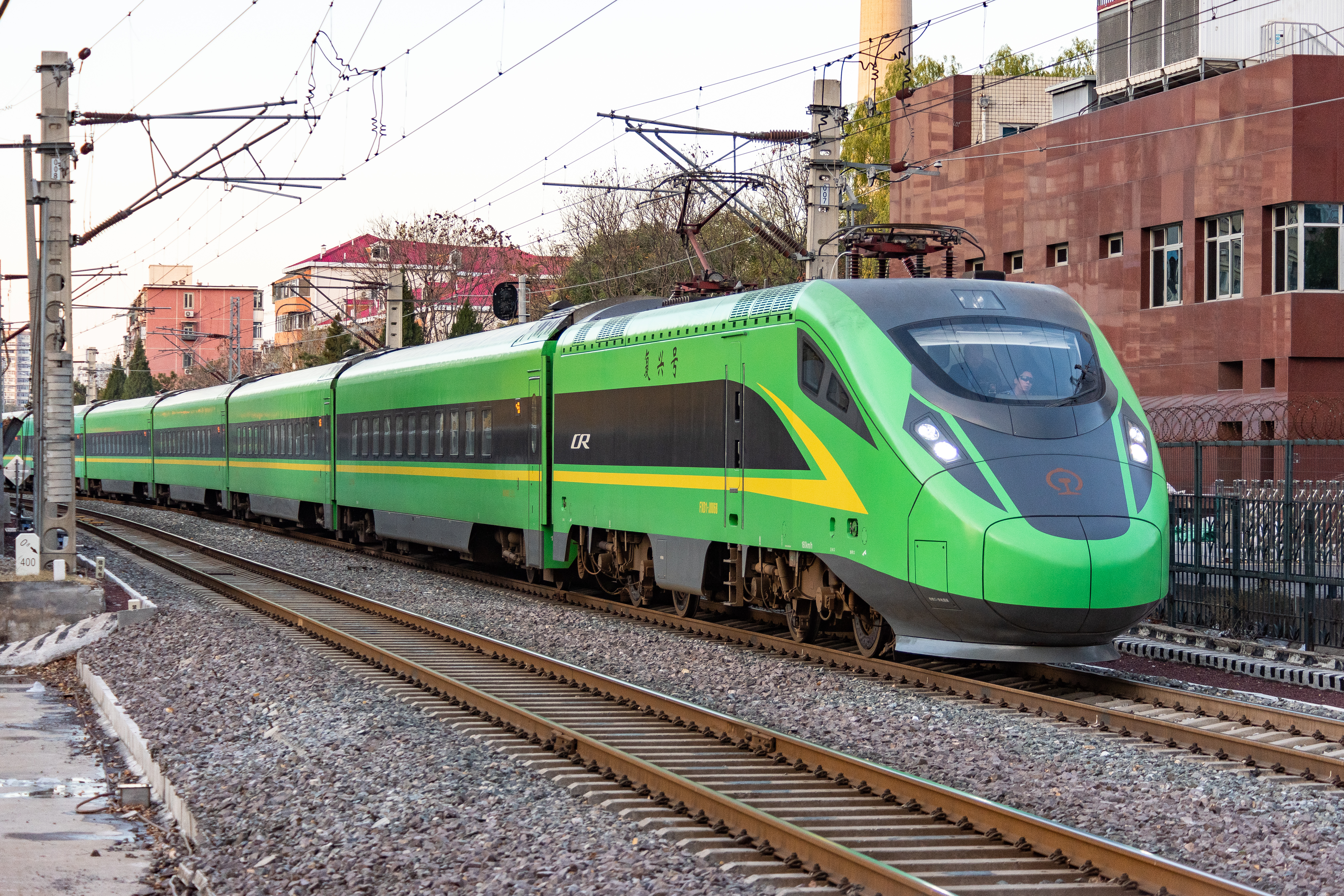
CR200J on the Beijing–Kowloon railway

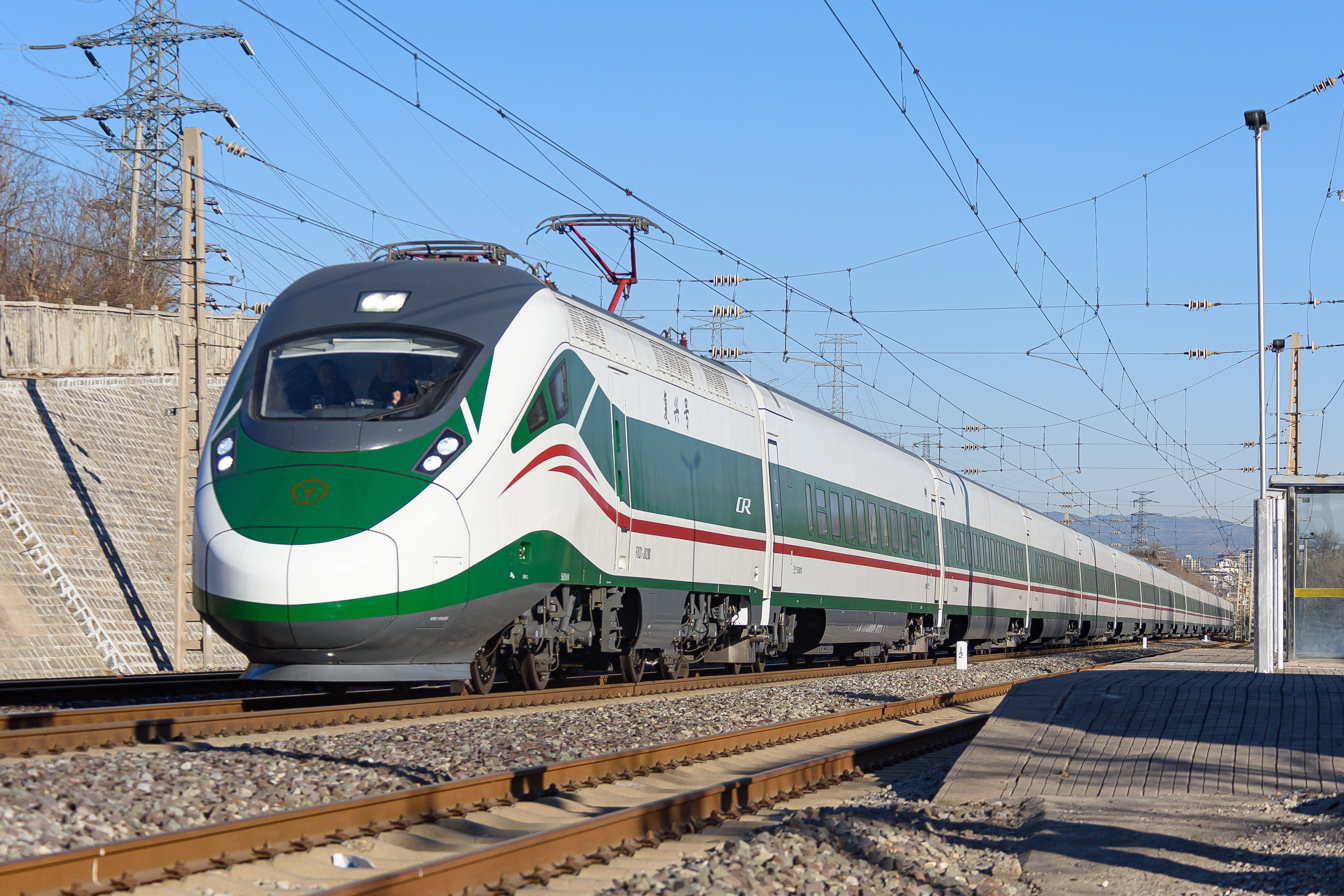
CR200J with revised livery

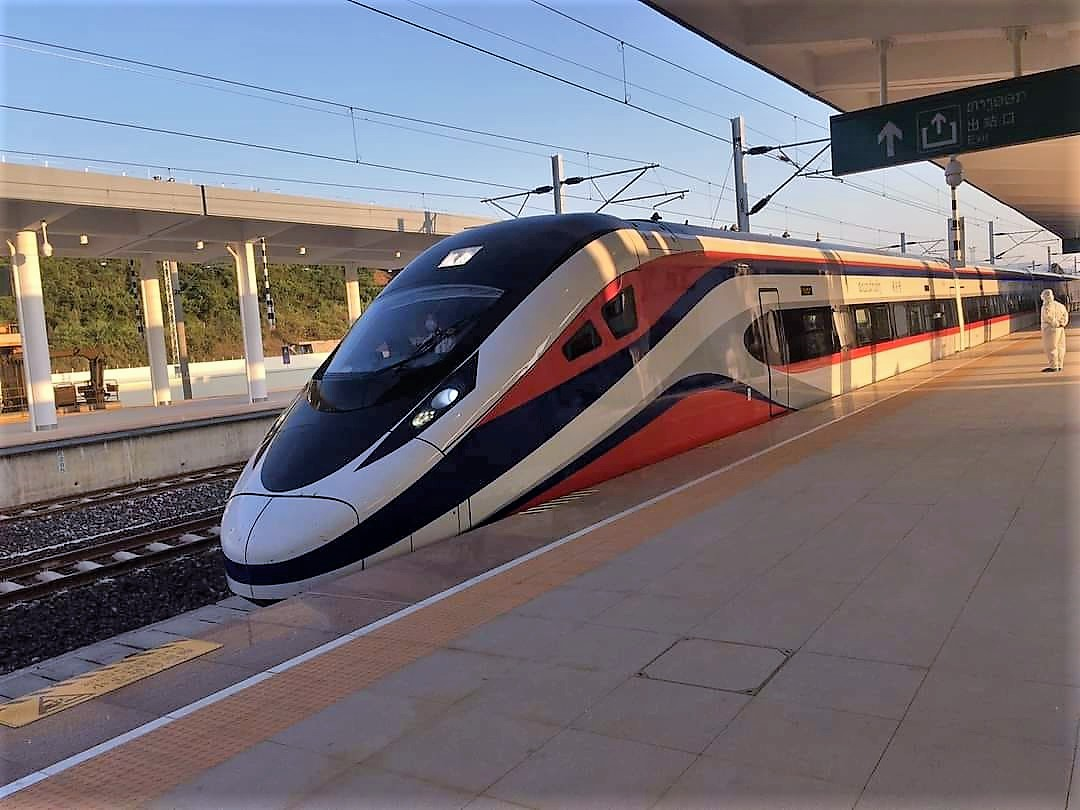
CR200J on the Boten–Vientiane railway

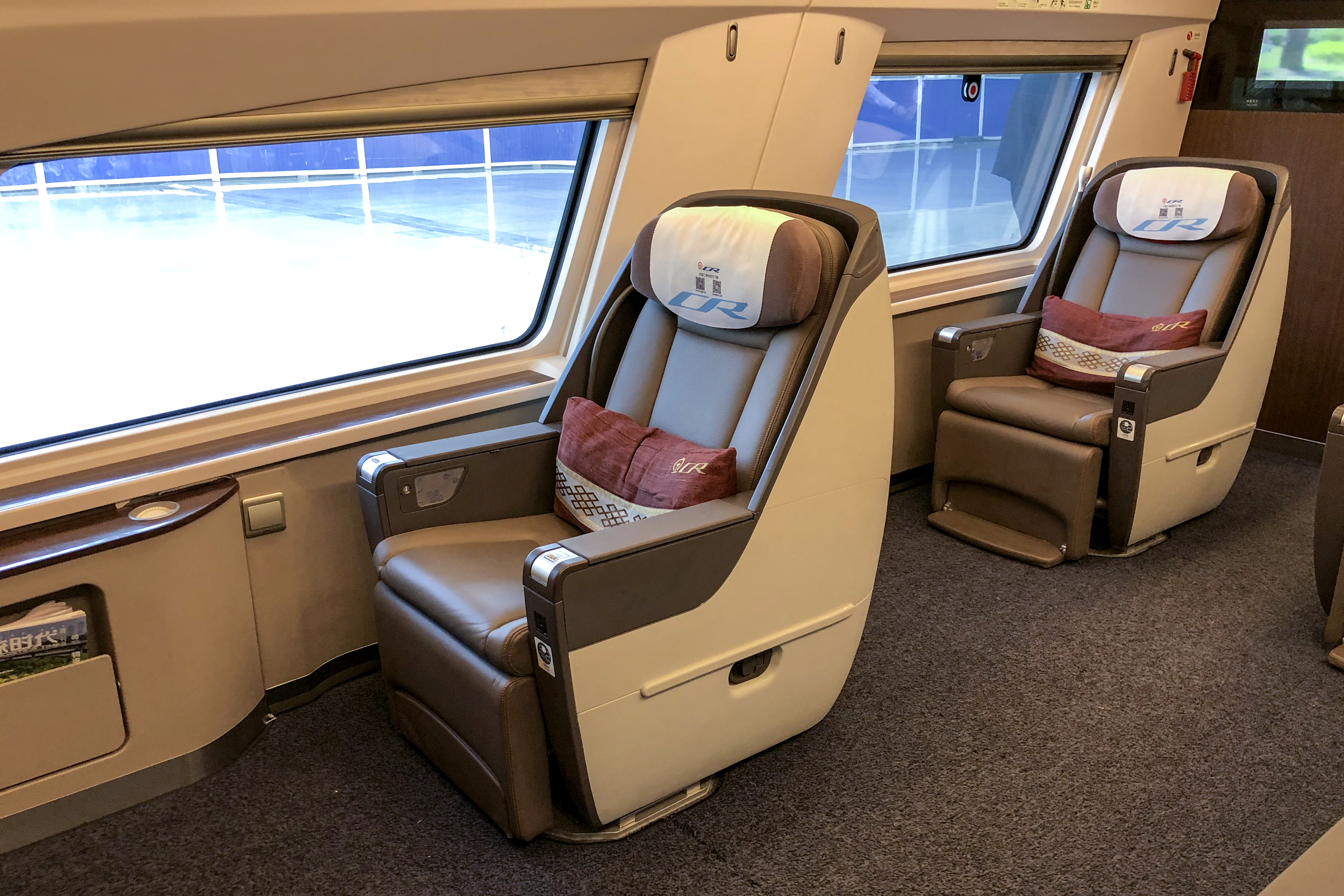
Business class seats on CR400AF-B-2116

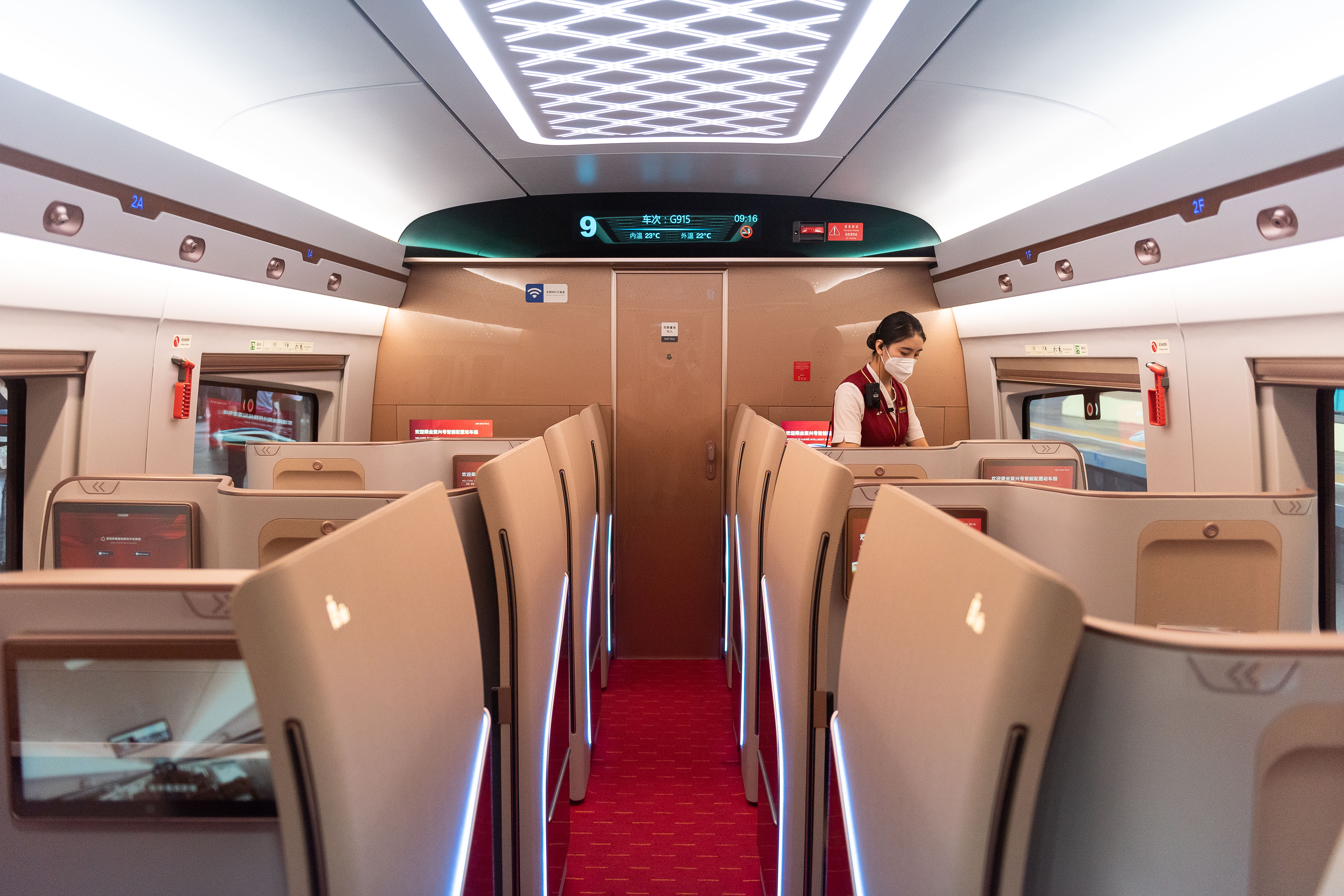
Redesigned business class seats on CR400BF-GZ-5143.

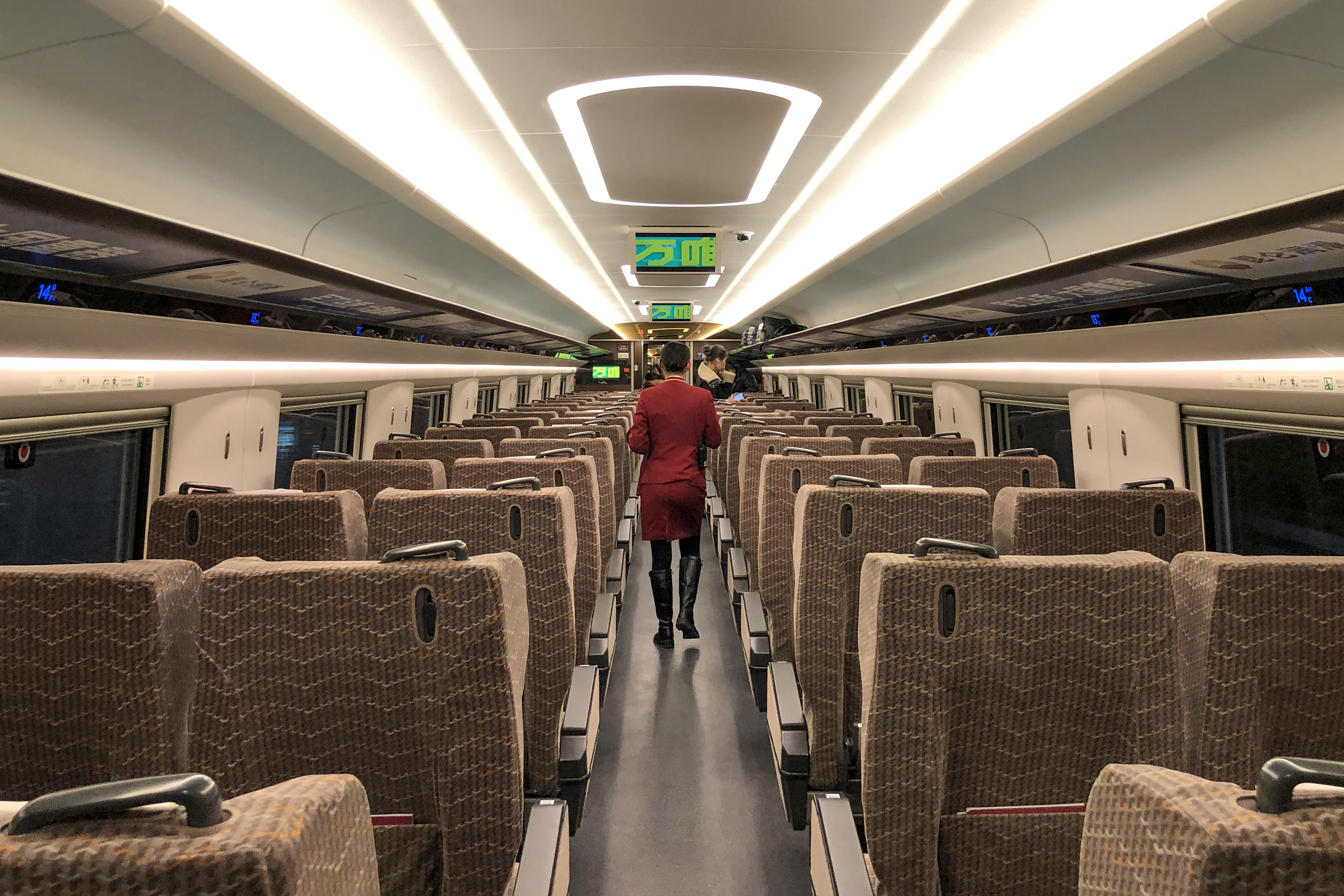
First Class cabin interior on CR400AF-B-2119

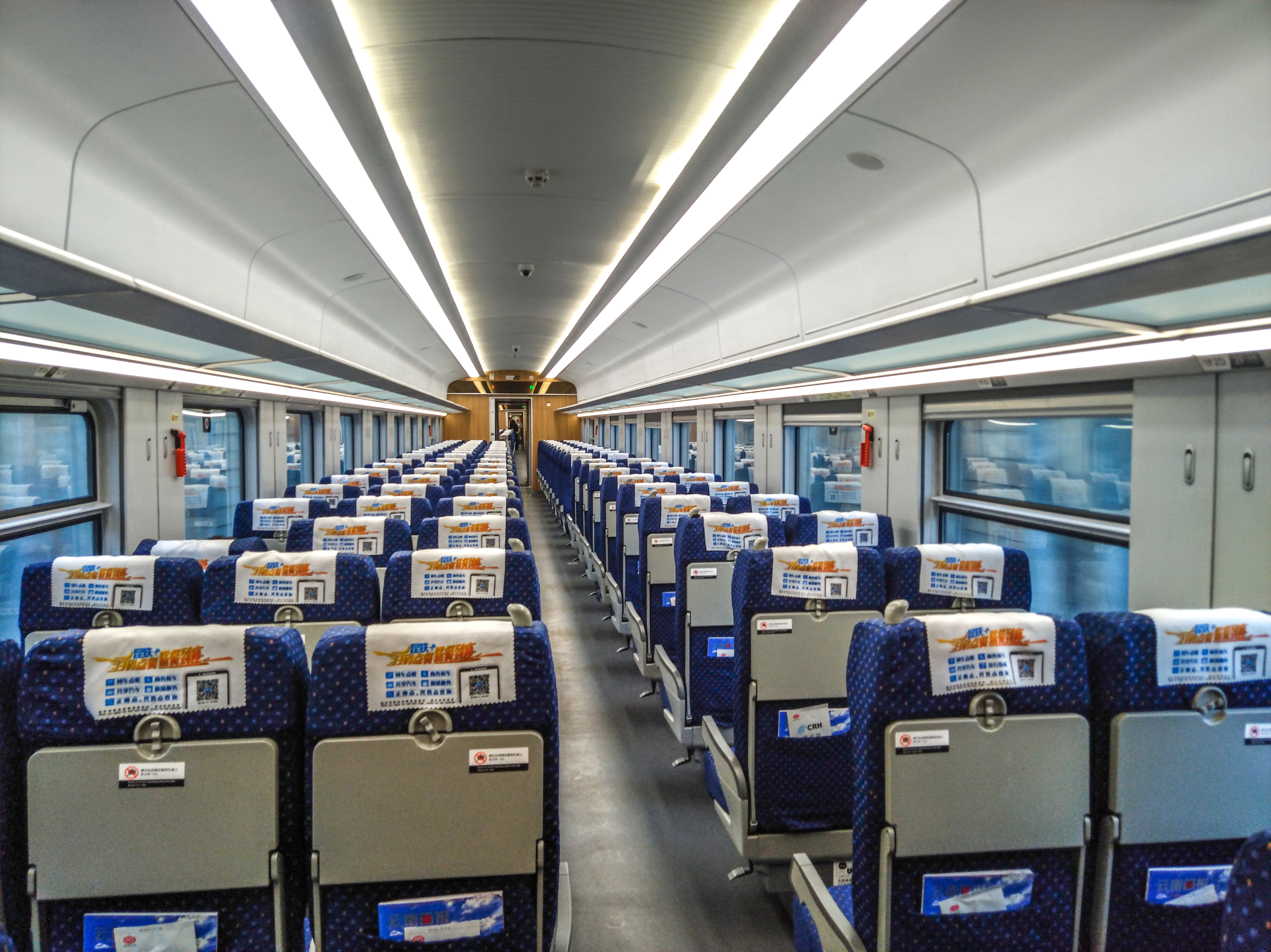
Second class interior on CR200J

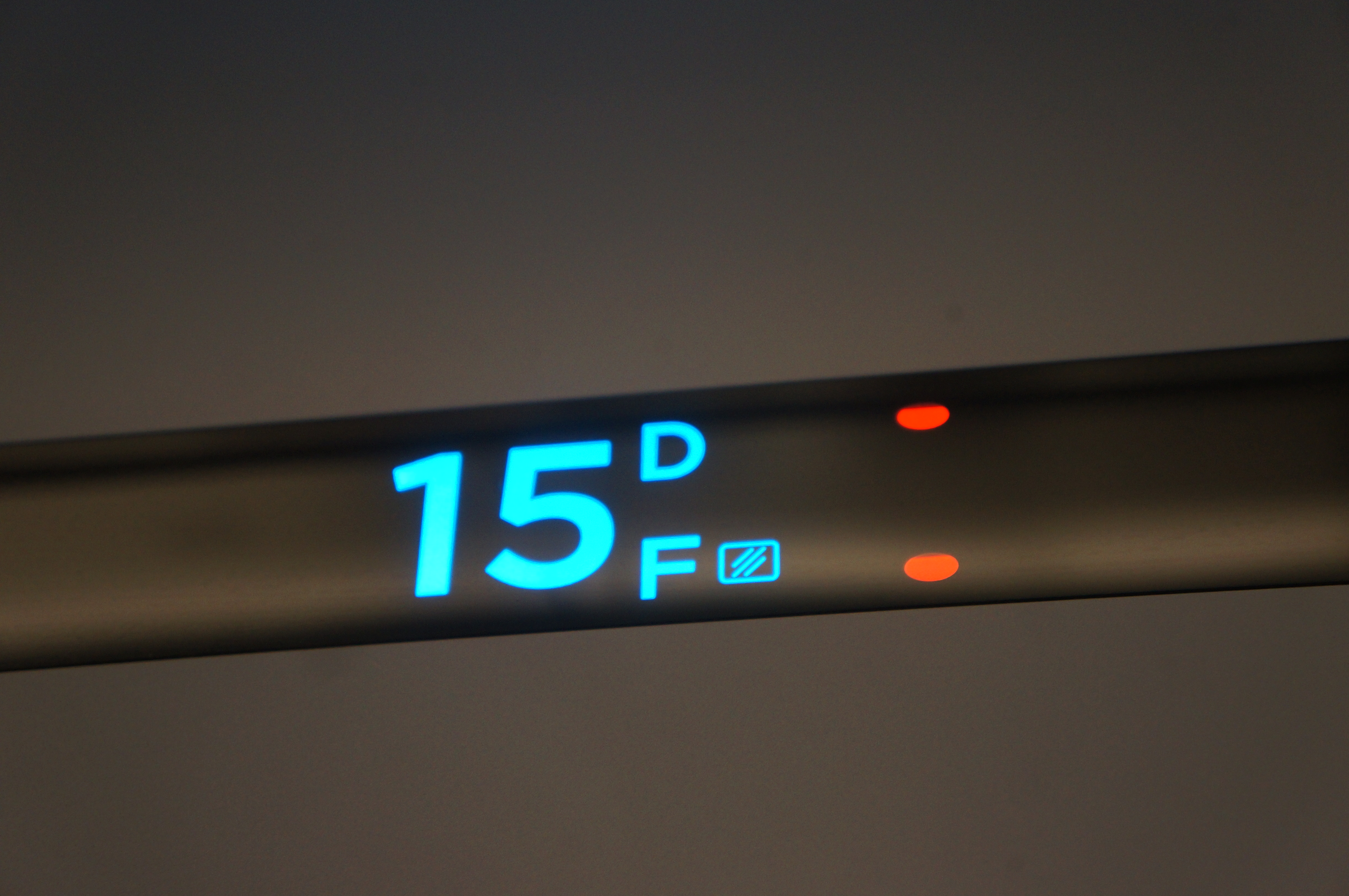
Seating sign on CR400BF with booking status indicators: red indicators refer to booked and green for empty.

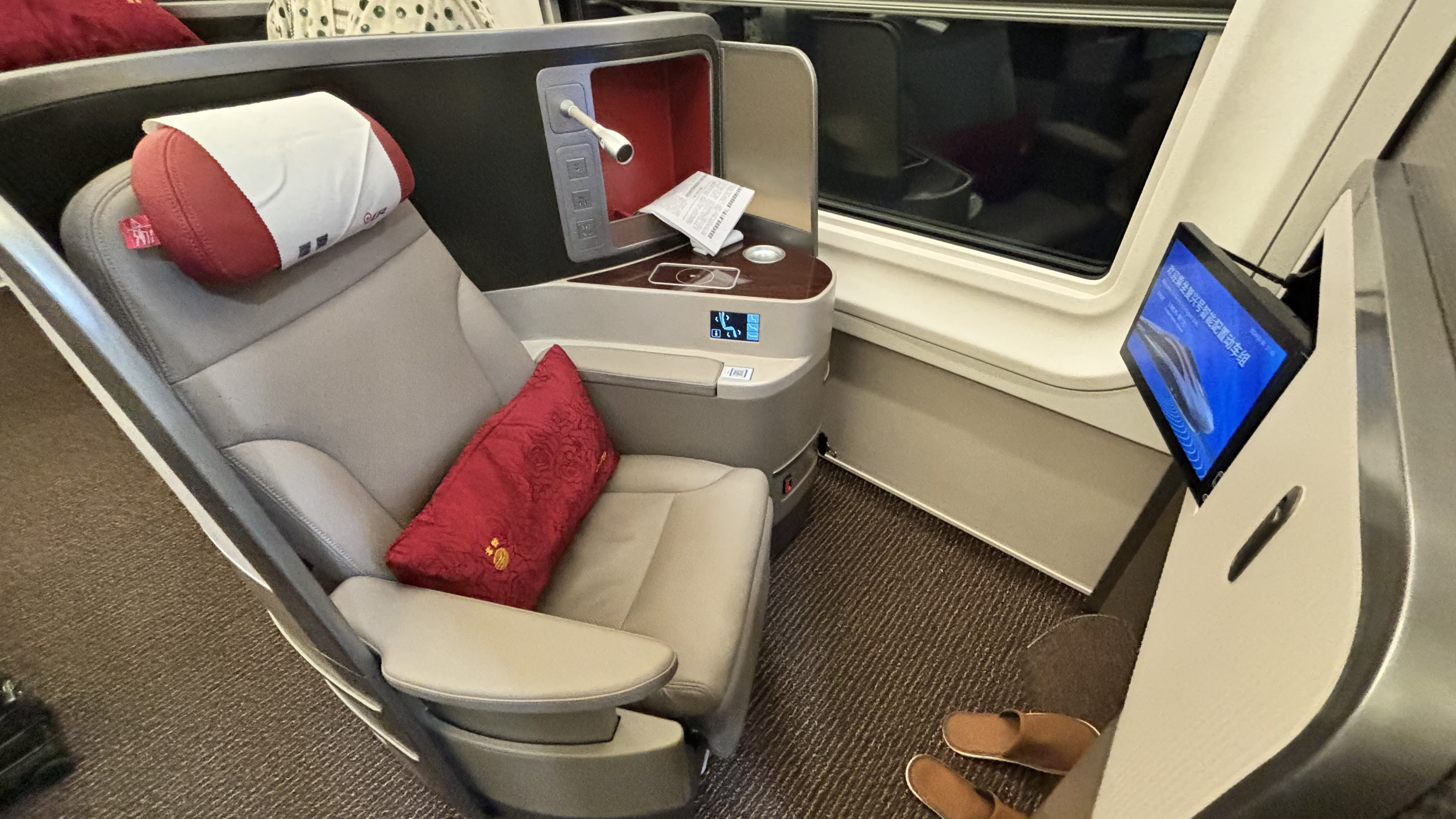
Business Class Seats Located on the CR400AF-Z Smart Trainset

== See also ==
- Hexie (train)
- China Railway CR450AF
- China Railway CR450BF
- China Railway CR400AF
- China Railway CR400BF
- China Railway CR300AF
- China Railway CR300BF
- China Railway CR220J
- China Railway CR200J
