= Hexie (train) =

Chinese high-speed electric multiple units

Hexie (Harmony)
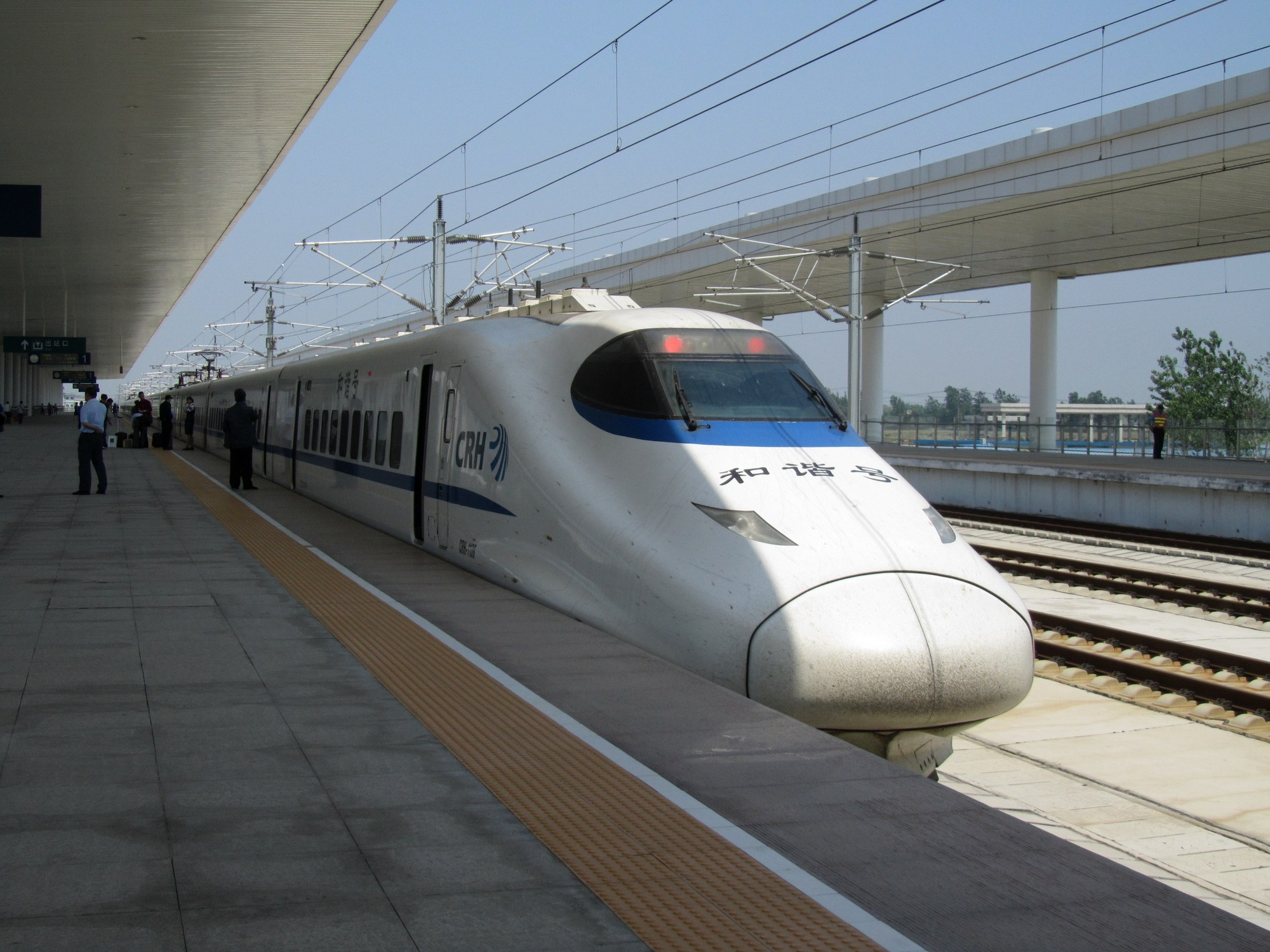
- CRH2B at Songjiang South railway station
- In service: 28 January 2007 – Present
- Manufacturer: Bombardier Transportation; Kawasaki Heavy Industries; Alstom; Siemens; CRRC
- Operators: China Railway Corporation

Specifications
- Train length: 200.84 m (658 ft 11 in) or more
- Maximum speed: 380 km/h (236 mph)
- Power supply: Overhead catenary
- Electric system(s): 25 kV 50 Hz AC
- Current collector(s): Pantograph
- Track gauge: 1,435 mm (4 ft 8 1/2 in) standard gauge

Hexie
- Simplified Chinese: 和谐号
- Traditional Chinese: 和諧號
- Literal meaning: Harmony
Transcriptions
Standard Mandarin
- Hanyu Pinyin: Héxié hào

Hexie (Chinese: 和谐号; pinyin: Héxié hào; lit. 'Harmony'), also known as the CRH series EMU, is an umbrella term for the multiple unit high-speed and higher-speed trains operated by China Railway under the China Railway High-speed brand. All series of Hexie are based on foreign-developed technology and later manufactured locally in China through technology transfer licenses, with the ultimate goal of China acquiring the know-how and capability to produce high-speed rail trains.

The Harmony series does not belong to any single platform, instead encompassing all high-speed trains in China with roots in foreign technology, specifically CRH1, CRH2, CRH3 and CRH5. Although later variants of Hexie such as CRH380A were designed by Chinese companies, they are still classified as CRH due to incorporation of foreign technology.

== History ==
In 2007, China's Ministry of Railways drafted a plan for China's future high-speed network. Bombardier Transportation, Kawasaki Heavy Industries, Alstom and later Siemens joined the high-speed train manufacturing project that later became known as Harmony. Forming joint-ventures with Chinese company CNR and CSR, these four foreign companies signed agreements with China to manufacture high-speed trains for China as well as provide assistance for Chinese companies to manufacture train cars locally in the future.

While the initial train sets from each Hexie series were manufactured overseas, subsequent sets are manufactured locally through technology transfer, a key requirement for China. The signalling, track and support structures, control software, and station design are developed domestically with foreign elements as well. Although the first domestically produced trains were initially delivered in complete knock-down form, eventually manufacturing as a whole became predominantly Chinese.

China currently holds many patents related to the internal components of these trains, re-designed in China to allow the trains to run at higher speeds than the foreign designs allowed. However, these patents are only valid within China, and as such hold no international power. This weakness on the intellectual property of Hexie trains became an obstruction for China to export its high-speed rail related products, leading to the development of a completely redesigned train brand, Fuxing, which is based on indigenous technologies.

While most Hexie series trains are designed for China Railway, a variant of the CRH380A has been modified for operation by MTR Corporation of Hong Kong, who will operate these trains under the brand Vibrant Express specifically for the Guangzhou–Shenzhen–Hong Kong Express Rail Link.

== Variants ==
China Railway High-speed train passing through Shenzhou railway station in Hainan

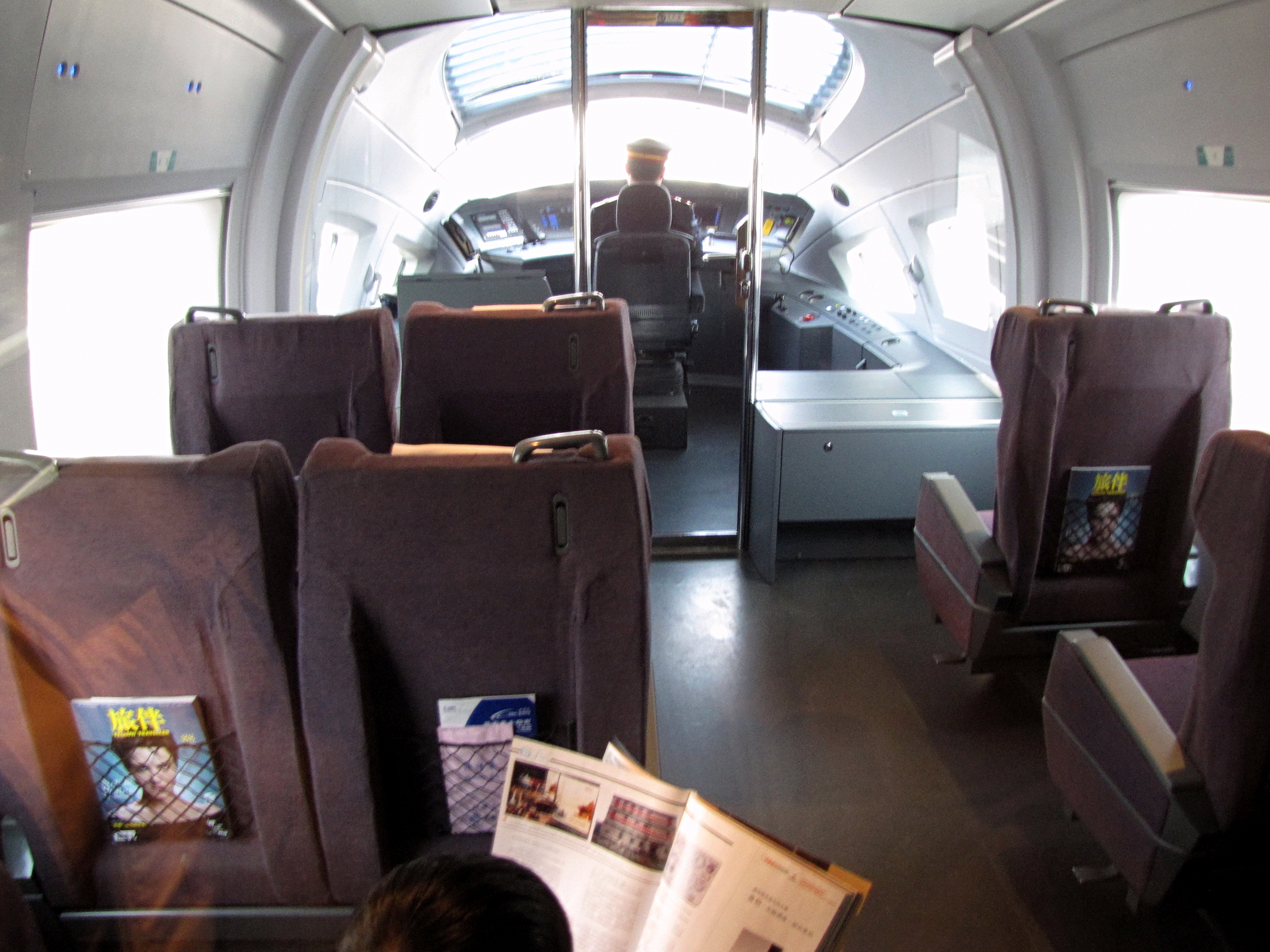
Engineer's compartment on the CRH3

The Harmony brand has different electric multiple unit trainsets, the designs for which are imported from other nations and designated CRH-1 through CRH-5 and CRH380A(L), CRH380B(L), and CRH380C(L). CRH trainsets are intended to provide fast and convenient travel between cities. Some of the trainsets are manufactured locally through technology transfer, a key requirement for China. The signalling, track and support structures, control software, and station design are developed domestically with foreign elements as well, so the system as a whole is predominantly Chinese. China currently holds many new patents related to the internal components of these trains, re-designed in China to allow the trains to run at higher speeds than the foreign designs allowed. However, these patents are only valid within China, and as such hold no international power.

The trainsets are as follows:

- CRH1 produced by Bombardier Transportation's joint venture Sifang Power (Qingdao) Transportation (BST), CRH1A, and CRH1B, nicknamed "Metro" or "Bread", derived from Bombardier's Regina; CRH1E, nicknamed "Lizard", is Bombardier's ZEFIRO 250 design.
  - CRH1A: sets consists of 8 cars; maximum operating speed of 250 km/h (155 mph)
  - CRH1B: a modified 16-car version; maximum operating speed of 250 km/h (155 mph)
  - CRH1E: a 16-car high-speed sleeper version; maximum operating speed of 250 km/h (155 mph)
- CRH2: nicknamed "Hairtail", derived from E2 Series 1000 Shinkansen.
  - CRH2A: In 2006, China unveiled CRH2, a modified version of the Japanese Shinkansen E2-1000 series. An order for 60 8-car sets had been placed in 2004, with the first few built in Japan, the rest produced by Sifang Locomotive and Rolling Stock in China.
  - CRH2B: a modified 16-car version of CRH2; maximum operating speed of 250 km/h (155 mph)
  - CRH2C (Stage one): a modified version of CRH2 with a maximum operating speed up to 300 km/h (186 mph) as a result of replacing two intermediate trailer cars with motored cars
  - CRH2C (Stage two): a modified version of CRH2C (stage one) has a maximum operating speed up to 350 km/h (217 mph) by using more powerful motors
  - CRH2E: a modified 16-car version of CRH2 with sleeping cars
- CRH3: nickname "Rabbit", derived from Siemens ICE3 (class 403); 8-car sets; maximum operating speed of 350 km/h (217 mph).
- CRH5A: derived from Alstom Pendolino ETR600; 8-car sets; maximum operating speed of 250 km/h (155 mph).
- CRH6: designed by CSR Puzhen and CSR Sifang, will be manufactured by CSR Jiangmen. It is designed to have two versions: one with a top operating speed of 220 km/h (137 mph); the other with a top operating speed of 160 km/h (99 mph). They will be used on 200 km/h (124 mph) or 250 km/h (155 mph) Inter-city High Speed Rail lines; planned to enter service by 2011.
- CRH380A; Maximum operating speed of 380 km/h (236 mph). Developed by CSR and manufactured by Sifang Locomotive and Rolling Stock; entered service in 2010.
  - CRH380A: 8-car version
  - CRH380AL: 16-car version
- CRH380B: upgraded version of CRH3; maximum operating speed of 380 km/h (236 mph), manufactured by Tangshan Railway Vehicle and CRRC Changchun Railway Vehicles; entered service in 2011.
  - CRH380B: 8-car version
  - CRH380BL: 16-car version
- CRH380CL: designed and manufactured by CRRC Changchun Railway Vehicles. Maximum operating speed of 380 km/h; planned to enter service in 2012.
- CRH380D: also named Zefiro 380; maximum operating speed of 380 km/h (236 mph), manufactured by Bombardier Sifang (Qingdao) Transportation Ltd.; planned to enter service in 2012.
  - CRH380D: 8-car version

CRH1A, B,E, CRH2A, B,E, and CRH5A are designed for a maximum operating speed (MOR) of 200 km/h (124 mph) and can reach up to 250 km/h (155 mph). CRH3C and CRH2C designs have an MOR of 310 km/h (193 mph), and can reach up to 350 km/h (217 mph), with a top testing speed more than 380 km/h (236 mph). However, in practical terms, issues such as maintenance costs, comfort, and safety make the maximum speed of more than 380 km/h (236 mph) impractical and remain limiting factors.

| Train type | Car dimensions | Total length | Top speed | Seating capacity | Formation | Power output (under 25 kV) | Entry into Service |
|---|---|---|---|---|---|---|---|
CRH1
| CRH1A–200 | End cars length:26.95 m (88 ft 5 in); Inter cars length:26.6 m (87 ft 3 in); Width:3.328 m (10 ft 11.0 in); Height:4,040 mm (13 ft 3 in) | Calculated:213.5 m (700 ft 6 in); Real:213.5 m (700 ft 6 in) | Test: 278 km/h (173 mph); Design: 255 km/h (158 mph); Continuous operation:200 km/h (124 mph); Current operation:210 km/h (130 mph) | 673: 144 first and 529 standard 612: 128 first and 484 standard | 5M3T | 5.3 MW (7,107 hp) | February 1, 2007 |
| CRH1A–250 | End cars length:26.95 m (88 ft 5 in); Inter cars length:26.6 m (87 ft 3 in); Width:3.328 m (10 ft 11.0 in); Height:4,040 mm (13 ft 3 in) | Calculated:213.5 m (700 ft 6 in); Real:213.5 m (700 ft 6 in) | Test: 278 km/h (173 mph); Design: 285 km/h (177 mph); Continuous operation:250 km/h (155 mph); Current operation:250 km/h (155 mph) | 597: 144 first and 453 standard 646: 128 first and 518 standard 635: 128 first and 507 standard 673: 144 first and 529 standard | 5M3T | 5.3 MW (7,107 hp) | September ?, 2010 |
| CRH1B | End cars length:26.95 m (88 ft 5 in); Inter cars length:26.6 m (87 ft 3 in); Width:3.328 m (10 ft 11.0 in); Height:4,040 mm (13 ft 3 in) | Calculated:426.3 m (1,398 ft 7 in); Real:426.3 m (1,398 ft 7 in) | Test: 292 km/h (181 mph); Design: 275 km/h (171 mph); Continuous operation:250 km/h (155 mph); Current operation:250 km/h (155 mph) | 1299: 208 first and 1091 standard | 10M6T | 11 MW (14,751 hp) | May 1, 2009 |
| CRH1B (1E head) | End cars length:28.28 m (92 ft 9 in); Inter cars length:26.6 m (87 ft 3 in); Width:3.328 m (10 ft 11.0 in); Height:4.04 m (13 ft 3 in) | Calculated:428.96 m (1,407 ft 4 in); Real:428.9 m (1,407 ft 2 in) | Test: 292 km/h (181 mph); Design: 275 km/h (171 mph); Continuous operation:250 km/h (155 mph); Current operation:250 km/h (155 mph) | 1299: 208 first and 1091 standard | 10M6T | 11 MW (14,751 hp) | May 1, 2009 |
| CRH1E | End cars length:28.28 m (92 ft 9 in); Inter cars length:26.6 m (87 ft 3 in); Width:3.328 m (10 ft 11.0 in); Height:4.04 m (13 ft 3 in) | Calculated:428.96 m (1,407 ft 4 in); Real:428.9 m (1,407 ft 2 in) | Test: N/A; Design: 275 km/h (171 mph); Continuous operation:250 km/h (160 mph); Current operation:250 km/h (160 mph) | 618: 122 standard, 16 luxury sleepers and 480 soft sleepers 642: 122 standard and 520 soft sleepers | 10M6T | 11 MW (14,751 hp) | November 4, 2009 |
| CRH1A–A | End cars length:26.995 m (88 ft 6.8 in); Inter cars length:25.325 m (83 ft 1.0 in); Width:3.358 m (11 ft 0.2 in); Height:4.16 m (13 ft 8 in) | Calculated:205.94 m (675 ft 8 in); Real:207.9 m (682 ft 1 in) | Test: N/A; Design: 275 km/h (171 mph); Continuous operation:250 km/h (160 mph); Current operation:250 km/h (160 mph) | 613: 48 first and 565 standard | 5M3T | 5.5 MW (7,400 hp) | February 1, 2016 |
| CRH1E–250 | End cars length:26.995 m (88 ft 6.8 in); Inter cars length:25.325 m (83 ft 1.0 in); Width:3.358 m (11 ft 0.2 in); Height:4.16 m (13 ft 8 in) | Calculated:408.54 m (1,340 ft 4 in); Real:413.1 m (1,355 ft 4 in) | Test: N/A; Design: 275 km/h (171 mph); Continuous operation:250 km/h (160 mph); Current operation:250 km/h (160 mph) | 642: 110 standard and 532 soft sleepers | 10M6T | 11 MW (15,000 hp) | January 29, 2016 |
| CRH380D | End cars length:27.85 m (91 ft 4 in); Inter cars length:26.6 m (87 ft 3 in); Width:3.368 m (11 ft 0.6 in); Height:4.16 m (13 ft 8 in) | Calculated:215.3 m (706 ft 4 in); Real:215.3 m (706 ft 4 in) | Test: 420 km/h (260 mph); Design: 422 km/h (262 mph); Continuous operation:380 km/h (240 mph); Current operation:350 km/h (220 mph) | 554: 10 sightseeing, 32 first and 512 standard 556: 10 business, 28 first and 518 standard | 4M4T | 10 MW (13,000 hp) | April 19, 2014 |
CRH2
| CRH2G | End cars length:25.7 m (84 ft 4 in); Inter cars length:25 m (82 ft 0 in); Width:3.33 m (10 ft 11 in); Height:3.86 m (12 ft 8 in) | Calculated:201.4 m (660 ft 9 in); Real:201.4 m (660 ft 9 in) | Test: N/A; Design: 275 km/h (171 mph); Continuous operation:250 km/h (160 mph); Current operation:250 km/h (160 mph) | 613: 48 first and 565 standard | 4M4T | 4.8 MW (6,400 hp) | January 8, 2016 |
| CRH2A (EC) | End cars length:25.7 m (84 ft 4 in); Inter cars length:25 m (82 ft 0 in); Width: 3.38 m (11 ft 1 in); Height:3.7 m (12 ft 2 in) | Calculated:201.4 m (660 ft 9 in); Real:201.4 m (660 ft 9 in) | Test: N/A; Design: 300 km/h (190 mph); Continuous operation:250 km/h (155 mph); Current operation:250 km/h (155 mph) | 613: 48 first and 565 standard | 4M4T | 4.8 MW (6,400 hp) | November 6, 2013 |
| CRH2A (Old) | End cars length:25.7 m (84 ft 4 in); Inter cars length:25 m (82 ft 0 in); Width: 3.38 m (11 ft 1 in); Height:3.7 m (12 ft 2 in) | Calculated:201.4 m (660 ft 9 in); Real:201.4 m (660 ft 9 in) | Test: 282 km/h (175 mph); Design: 300 km/h (190 mph); Continuous operation:250 km/h (160 mph); Current operation:250 km/h (160 mph) | 610: 51 first and 559 standard | 4M4T | 4.8 MW (6,400 hp) | January 28, 2007 |
| CRH2C Stage 1 | End cars length:25.7 m (84 ft 4 in); Inter cars length:25 m (82 ft 0 in); Width: 3.38 m (11 ft 1 in); Height:3.7 m (12 ft 2 in) | Calculated:201.4 m (660 ft 9 in); Real:201.4 m (660 ft 9 in) | Test: 394.2 km/h (244.9 mph); Design: 370 km/h (230 mph); Continuous operation:320 km/h (200 mph); Current operation:300 km/h (190 mph) | 610: 51 first and 559 standard | 6M2T | 7.2 MW (9,700 hp) | August 1, 2008 |
| CRH2C Stage 2 | End cars length:25.7 m (84 ft 4 in); Inter cars length:25 m (82 ft 0 in); Width: 3.38 m (11 ft 1 in); Height:3.7 m (12 ft 2 in) | Calculated:201.4 m (660 ft 9 in); Real:201.4 m (660 ft 9 in) | Test: N/A; Design:394 km/h (245 mph); Continuous operation:350 km/h (217 mph); Current operation:310 km/h (193 mph) | 610: 51 first and 559 standard | 6M2T | 8.76 MW (11,750 hp) | February 6, 2010 |
| CRH2B | End cars length:25.7 m (84 ft 4 in); Inter cars length:25 m (82 ft 0 in); Width: 3.38 m (11 ft 1 in); Height:3.7 m (12 ft 2 in) | Calculated:401.4 m (1,316 ft 11 in); Real:401.4 m (1,316 ft 11 in) | Test: 275 km/h (171 mph); Design:300 km/h (190 mph); Continuous operation:250 km/h (155 mph); Current operation:250 km/h (160 mph) | 1240: 155 first and 1075 standard | 8M8T | 9.6 MW (12,900 hp) | August 1, 2008 |
| CRH2E | End cars length:25.7 m (84 ft 4 in); Inter cars length:25 m (82 ft 0 in); Width: 3.38 m (11 ft 1 in); Height:3.7 m (12 ft 2 in) | Calculated:401.4 m (1,316 ft 11 in); Real:401.4 m (1,316 ft 11 in) | Test: N/A; Design:275 km/h (171 mph); Continuous operation:250 km/h (155 mph); Current operation:250 km/h (155 mph) | 630: 110 standard and 520 soft sleepers | 8M8T | 9.6 MW (12,900 hp) | December 1, 2008 |
| CRH2E–NG | End cars length:25.7 m (84 ft 4 in); Inter cars length:25 m (82 ft 0 in); Width:3.33 m (10 ft 11 in); Height:3.75 m (12 ft 4 in) | Calculated:401.4 m (1,316 ft 11 in); Real:401.4 m (1,316 ft 11 in) | Test: N/A; Design:275 km/h (171 mph); Continuous operation:250 km/h (155 mph); Current operation:250 km/h (155 mph) | 642: 110 standard and 532 soft sleepers | 8M8T | 9.6 MW (12,900 hp) | December 14, 2015 |
| CRH2E–NG | End cars length:26.825 m (88 ft 0.1 in); Inter cars length:25.65 m (84 ft 2 in); Width:3.33 m (10 ft 11 in); Height:4,050 mm (13 ft 3 in) | Calculated:412.75 m (1,354 ft 2 in); Real:412.8 m (1,354 ft 4 in) | Test: N/A; Design:280 km/h (174 mph); Continuous operation:250 km/h (160 mph); Current operation:250 km/h (160 mph) | 880: 880 soft sleepers | 8M8T | 9.6 MW (12,900 hp) | July 1, 2017 |
| CRH380A | End cars length:26.5 m (86 ft 11 in); Inter cars length:25 m (82 ft 0 in); Width:3.38 m (11 ft 1 in); Height:3.7 m (12 ft 2 in) | Calculated:203 m (666 ft 0 in); Real:203 m (666 ft 0 in) | Test:416.6 km/h (258.9 mph); Design:416.6 km/h (258.9 mph); Continuous operation:380 km/h (240 mph); Current operation:350 km/h (220 mph) | 480: 18 sightseeing, 89 first and 373 standard | 6M2T | 9.6 MW (12,900 hp) | September 30, 2010 |
| CRH380A (New) | End cars length:26.5 m (86 ft 11 in); Inter cars length:25 m (82 ft 0 in); Width:3.38 m (11 ft 1 in); Height:3.7 m (12 ft 2 in) | Calculated:203 m (666 ft 0 in); Real:203 m (666 ft 0 in) | Test: N/A; Design: 420 km/h (260 mph); Continuous operation:380 km/h (240 mph); Current operation:350 km/h (220 mph) | 556: 10 business, 28 first and 518 standard | 6M2T | 9.6 MW (12,900 hp) | January 16, 2014 |
| CRH380AL | End cars length:26.5 m (86 ft 11 in); Inter cars length:25 m (82 ft 0 in); Width:3.38 m (11 ft 1 in); Height:3.7 m (12 ft 2 in) | Calculated:403 m (1,322 ft 2 in); Real:403 m (1,322 ft 2 in) | Test: 486.1 km/h (302.0 mph); Design: 420 km/h (260 mph); Continuous operation:380 km/h (240 mph); Current operation:350 km/h (220 mph) | 1028: 28 business, 162 first and 838 standard 1061: 20 business, 118 first and 923 standard | 14M2T | 20.44 MW (27,410 hp) | June 30, 2011 |
CRH3
| CRH3A | End cars length:27.05 m (88 ft 9 in); Inter cars length:25 m (82 ft 0 in); Width:3.3 m (10 ft 10 in); Height: 3.9 m (12 ft 10 in) | Calculated:204.1 m (669 ft 7 in); Real:209.75 m (688 ft 2 in) | Test: N/A; Design: 420 km/h (260 mph); Continuous operation:380 km/h (240 mph); Current operation:310 km/h (190 mph) | 613: 48 first and 565 standard | 4M4T | Other sets: 5.12 MW (6,870 hp); Set Nº. 5257: 7.2 MW (9,700 hp) | October 4, 2017 |
| CRH3C | End cars length:25.86 m (84 ft 10 in); Inter cars length:24.825 m (81 ft 5.4 in); Width:3.265 m (10 ft 8.5 in); Height:3,890 mm (12 ft 9 in) | Calculated:200.67 m (658 ft 4 in); Real:200.67 m (658 ft 4 in) | Test: 394.3 km/h (245.0 mph); Design:404 km/h (251 mph); Continuous operation:350 km/h (217 mph); Current operation:310 km/h (193 mph) | 546: 16 special, 40 first and 490 standard | 4M4T | 8.8 MW (11,800 hp) | August 1, 2008 |
| CRH380BG | End cars length:25.86 m (84 ft 10 in); Inter cars length:24.825 m (81 ft 5.4 in); Width:3.257 m (10 ft 8.2 in); Height:3,890 mm (12 ft 9 in) | Calculated:200.67 m (658 ft 4 in); Real:200.67 m (658 ft 4 in) | Test: N/A; Design: 420 km/h (260 mph); Continuous operation:380 km/h (236 mph); Current operation:350 km/h (217 mph) | 551: 16 sightseeing, 44 first and 491 standard 556: 10 sightseeing, 28 first and 518 standard | 4M4T | 9.376 MW (12,573 hp) | October 9, 2012 |
| CRH380BL | End cars length:25.86 m (84 ft 10 in); Inter cars length:24.825 m (81 ft 5.4 in); Width:3.257 m (10 ft 8.2 in); Height:3,890 mm (12 ft 9 in) | Calculated:399.27 m (1,309 ft 11 in); Real:399.27 m (1,309 ft 11 in) | Test: 487.3 km/h (302.8 mph); Design: 487 km/h (303 mph); Continuous operation:380 km/h (240 mph); Current operation:350 km/h (217 mph) | 1005: 28 business, 186 first and 791 standard 1015: 26 business, 118 first and 871 standard | 8M8T | 18.752 MW (25,147 hp) | January 13, 2011 |
| CRH380B | End cars length:26.475 m (86 ft 10.3 in); Inter cars length:25 m (82 ft 0 in); Width:3.257 m (10 ft 8.2 in); Height:3,890 mm (12 ft 9 in) | Calculated:202.95 m (665 ft 10 in); Real:202.95 m (665 ft 10 in) | Test: N/A; Design: 446 km/h (277 mph); Continuous operation:380 km/h (240 mph); Current operation:350 km/h (220 mph) | 556: 10 business, 28 first and 518 standard | 4M4T | 9.376 MW (12,573 hp) | January 16, 2014 |
| CRH380CL | End cars length:26.525 m (87 ft 0.3 in); Inter cars length:24.825 m (81 ft 5.4 in); Width:3.257 m (10 ft 8.2 in); Height:3,890 mm (12 ft 9 in) | Calculated:400.6 m (1,314 ft 4 in); Real:400.27 m (1,313 ft 3 in) | Test: N/A; Design:420 km/h (261 mph); Continuous operation:380 km/h (236 mph); Current operation:350 km/h (217 mph) | 1029: 28 business, 130 first and 871 standard 1015: 26 business, 118 first and 871 standard | 8M8T | 19.2 MW (25,700 hp) | April 3, 2013 |
CRH5
| CRH5A | End cars length:27.6 m (90 ft 7 in); Inter cars length:25 m (82 ft 0 in); Width:3.2 m (10 ft 6 in); Height:4.27 m (14 ft 0 in) | Calculated:205.2 m (673 ft 3 in); Real:211.5 m (693 ft 11 in) | Test: N/A; Design: 275 km/h (171 mph); Continuous operation:250 km/h (160 mph); Current operation:250 km/h (160 mph) | 622: 60 first and 562 standard 586: 112 first and 474 standard | 5M3T | Other sets: 5.5 MW (7,400 hp); Set Nº. 5191: 7.2 MW (9,700 hp) | April 18, 2007 |
| CRH5G (Old) | End cars length:27.6 m (90 ft 7 in); Inter cars length:25 m (82 ft 0 in); Width:3.2 m (10 ft 6 in); Height:4.27 m (14 ft 0 in) | Calculated:205.2 m (673 ft 3 in); Real:211.5 m (693 ft 11 in) | Test: N/A; Design:275 km/h (171 mph) / 300 km/h (186 mph); Continuous operation:250 km/h (160 mph); Current operation:250 km/h (160 mph) | 613: 48 first and 565 second class | 5M3T | Other sets: 5.5 MW (7,400 hp); Set Nº. 5191: 7.2 MW (9,700 hp) | December 26, 2014 |
| CRH5G (New) | End cars length:26.85 m (88 ft 1 in); Inter cars length:26 m (85 ft 4 in); Width:3.3 m (10 ft 10 in); Height:4.1 m (13 ft 5 in) | Calculated:209.7 m (688 ft 0 in); Real:211.5 m (693 ft 11 in) | Test: N/A; Design:275 km/h (171 mph) / 300 km/h (186 mph); Continuous operation:250 km/h (160 mph); Current operation:250 km/h (160 mph) | 613: 48 first and 565 second class | 5M3T | Other sets: 5.5 MW (7,400 hp); Set Nº. 5191: 7.2 MW (9,700 hp) | December 26, 2014 |
| CRH5E | End cars length:26.85 m (88 ft 1 in); Inter cars length:26 m (85 ft 4 in); Width:3.3 m (10 ft 10 in); Height:4.1 m (13 ft 5 in) | Calculated:417.7 m (1,370 ft 5 in); Real:418.7 m (1,373 ft 8 in) | Test: N/A; Design: 275 km/h (171 mph); Continuous operation:250 km/h (160 mph); Current operation:250 km/h (160 mph) | 642: 110 standard and 532 soft sleepers 880: 880 soft sleepers | 10M6T | 11 MW (15,000 hp) | Under testing |
CRH6
| CRH6A | End cars length:25.7 m (84 ft 4 in); Inter cars length:25 m (82 ft 0 in); Width:3.3 m (10 ft 10 in); Height:3,860 mm (12 ft 8 in) | Calculated:201.4 m (660 ft 9 in); Real:201.4 m (660 ft 9 in) | Test: 220 km/h (140 mph); Design: 250 km/h (160 mph); Continuous operation:200 km/h (120 mph); Current operation:200 km/h (120 mph) | 1488: 557 standard and 931 standings 1488: 477 standard and 1011 standings 613: 48 first and 565 standard | 4M4T | 5.52 MW (7,400 hp) | February 12, 2014 |
| CRH6A–A | End cars length:25.7 m (84 ft 4 in); Inter cars length:25 m (82 ft 0 in); Width:3.3 m (10 ft 10 in); Height:3,860 mm (12 ft 8 in) | Calculated:101.4 m (332 ft 8 in); Real:101.4 m (332 ft 8 in) | Test: 220 km/h (140 mph); Design: 250 km/h (160 mph); Continuous operation:200 km/h (120 mph); Current operation:200 km/h (120 mph) | 688: 252 standard and 436 standings | 2M2T | 2.76 MW (3,701 hp) | Under testing |
| CRH6F | End cars length:25.7 m (84 ft 4 in); Inter cars length:25 m (82 ft 0 in); Width:3.3 m (10 ft 10 in); Height:3,860 mm (12 ft 8 in) | Calculated:201.4 m (660 ft 9 in); Real:201.4 m (660 ft 9 in) | Test: 176 km/h (109 mph); Design: 200 km/h (124 mph); Continuous operation:160 km/h (99 mph); Current operation:160 km/h (99 mph) | 1988: ... standard and ... standings | 4M4T | 5.152 MW (6,909 hp) | July 11, 2015 |
| CRH6F–A | End cars length:25.7 m (84 ft 4 in); Inter cars length:25 m (82 ft 0 in); Width:3.3 m (10 ft 10 in); Height:3,860 mm (12 ft 8 in) | Calculated:101.4 m (332 ft 8 in); Real:101.4 m (332 ft 8 in) | Test: 176 km/h (109 mph); Design: 200 km/h (124 mph); Continuous operation:160 km/h (99 mph); Current operation:160 km/h (99 mph) | 875: ... standard and ... standings | 2M2T | 2.576 MW (3,454 hp) | March 26, 2018 |

=== Chinese CRH trainsets order timetable ===
| Date | Factory | Speed Level | Type | Quantity (set) | Quantity (car) | Amount |
|---|---|---|---|---|---|---|
| 2004-10-10 | Alstom | 250 km/h | CRH5A | 3 | 24 | 620 million EUR |
| 2004-10-10 | CNR Changchun | 250 km/h | CRH5A | 57 | 456 | 620 million EUR |
| 2004-10-12 | BST (Bombardier & CSR) | 250 km/h | CRH1A | 20 | 160 | US$350 million |
| 2004-10-20 | Kawasaki | 250 km/h | CRH2A | 3 | 24 | 9,300 million RMB |
| 2004-10-20 | CSR Sifang | 250 km/h | CRH2A | 57 | 456 | 9,300 million RMB |
| 2005-05-30 | BST | 250 km/h | CRH1A | 20 | 160 | US$350 million |
| 2005-06 | CSR Sifang | 300 km/h | CRH2C Stage one | 30 | 240 | 8,200 million RMB |
| 2005-06 | CSR Sifang | 350 km/h | CRH2C Stage two | 30 | 240 | 8,200 million RMB |
| 2005-11-20 | Siemens | 350 km/h | CRH3C | 3 | 24 | 13,000 million RMB |
| 2005-11-20 | CNR Tangshan | 350 km/h | CRH3C | 57 | 456 | 13,000 million RMB |
| 2007-10-31 | BST | 250 km/h | CRH1B | 20 | 320 | 1,000 million EUR |
| 2007-10-31 | BST | 250 km/h | CRH1E | 20 | 320 | 1,000 million EUR |
| 2007-11 | CSR Sifang | 250 km/h | CRH2B | 10 | 160 | 1,200 million RMB |
| 2007-11 | CSR Sifang | 250 km/h | CRH2E | 6 | 96 | 900 million RMB |
| 2008-12-06 | CSR Sifang | 250 km/h | CRH2E | 14 | 224 | 2,100 million RMB |
| 2009-09-23 | CNR Changchun | 250 km/h | CRH5A | 30 | 240 | 4,800 million RMB |
| 2009-03-16 | CNR Tangshan | 380 km/h | CRH380BL | 70 | 1,120 | 39,200 million RMB |
| 2009-03-16 | CNR Changchun | 380 km/h | CRH380BL | 30 | 480 | 39,200 million RMB |
| 2009-09-28 | CSR Sifang | 380 km/h | CRH380A | 40 | 320 | 45,000 million RMB |
| 2009-09-28 | CSR Sifang | 380 km/h | CRH380AL | 100 | 1,600 | 45,000 million RMB |
| 2009-09-28; Modified 2012-09-05 | BST | 380 km/h | CRH380D | 70 | 560 | 27,400 million RMB |
| 2009-09-28; Modified 2012-09-05 | BST | 250 km/h | CRH1A | 46 | 368 | 27,400 million RMB |
| 2009-09-28; Modified 2012-09-05 | BST | 250 km/h | Zefiro 250NG | 60 | 480 | 27,400 million RMB |
| 2009-09-28 | CNR Changchun | 380 km/h | CRH380B | 40 | 320 | 23,520 million RMB |
| 2009-09-28 | CNR Changchun | 380 km/h | CRH380BL | 15 | 240 | 23,520 million RMB |
| 2009-09-28 | CNR Changchun | 380 km/h | CRH380CL | 25 | 400 | 23,520 million RMB |
| 2009-09-28 | CNR Tangshan | 350 km/h | CRH3C | 20 | 160 | 3,920 million RMB |
| 2009-12-30 | CSR Puzhen | 220 km/h | CRH6 | 24 | 192 | 2,346 million RMB |
| 2010-07-16 | BST | 250 km/h | CRH1A | 40 | 320 | 5,200 million RMB |
| 2010-09-14 | CSR Sifang | 250 km/h | CRH2A | 40 | 320 | 3,400 million RMB |
| 2010-10-13 | CNR Changchun | 250 km/h | CRH5A | 20 | 160 | 2,700 million RMB |
| 2011-04-26 | CNR Changchun | 250 km/h | CRH5A | 30 | 240 | 3,870 million RMB |
| Total | | | | 1050 | 10,240 | |

=== Chinese CRH trainsets delivery timetable ===
Based on data published by Sinolink Securities; some small changes were made according to the most recent news.

| Type | 2006 | 2007 | 2008 | 2009 | 2010 | 2011 | Future (plan) | Total |
| CRH1A | 8 | 18 | 12 | 2 | 20 | 20 | 106 | 80 |
| CRH2A | 19 | 41 | | | 15 | 25 | | 100 |
| CRH5A | | 27 | 29 | 4 | 30 | 20 | 30 | 140 |
| CRH1B | | | 4 | 9 | 7 | | | 20 |
| CRH1E | | | | 3 | 8 | 9 | | 20 |
| CRH2B | | | 10 | | | | | 10 |
| CRH2E | | | 6 | 14 | | | | 20 |
| CRH2C | | | 10 | 20 | 30 | | | 60 |
| CRH3C | | | 7 | 36 | 37 | | | 80 |
| CRH380A | | | | | 40 | | | 40 |
| CRH380AL | | | | | 6 | 94 | | 100 |
| CRH380B | | | | | | 20 | 20^{1} | 40 |
| CRH380BL | | | | | 11 | 49 | 55^{1} | 115 |
| CRH380CL | | | | | | | 25^{1} | 25 |
| CRH380D | | | | | | | 70^{2} | 70 |
| CRH380DL | | | | | | | 0^{2} | 0 |
| CRH6 | | | | | | | 24 | 24 |
| Total | 27 | 86 | 78 | 88 | 204 | 237 | 330 | 1050 |
| Cumulative | 27 | 113 | 191 | 279 | 483 | 744 | 1050 | 1050 |

- ^1 All CRH380B and CRH380C units to be delivered before 2012.
- ^2 All CRH380D units to be delivered before 2014.

== Gallery ==
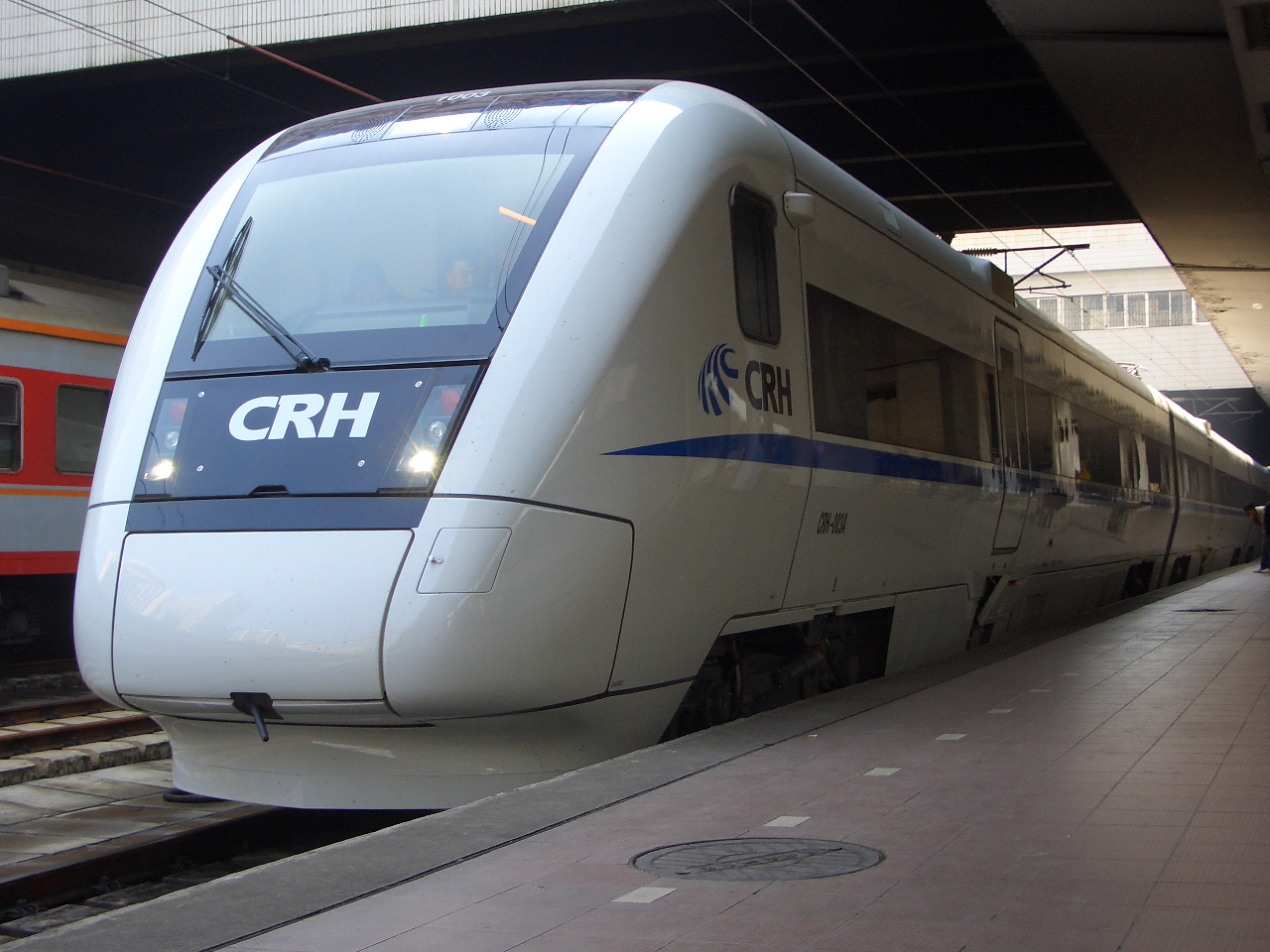
CRH1

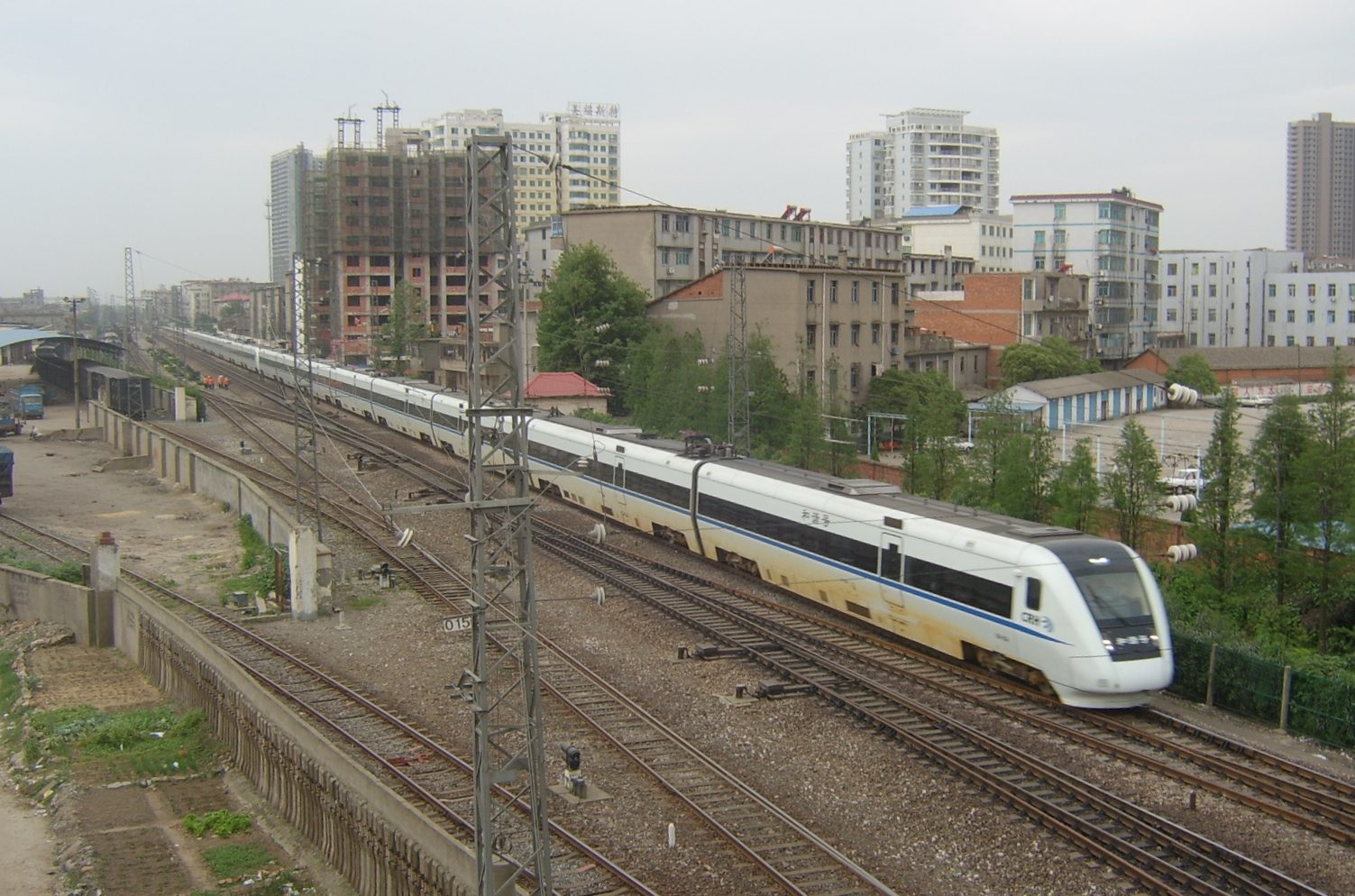
Two coupled 8-car CRH1A electric multiple unit train sets in Nanchang

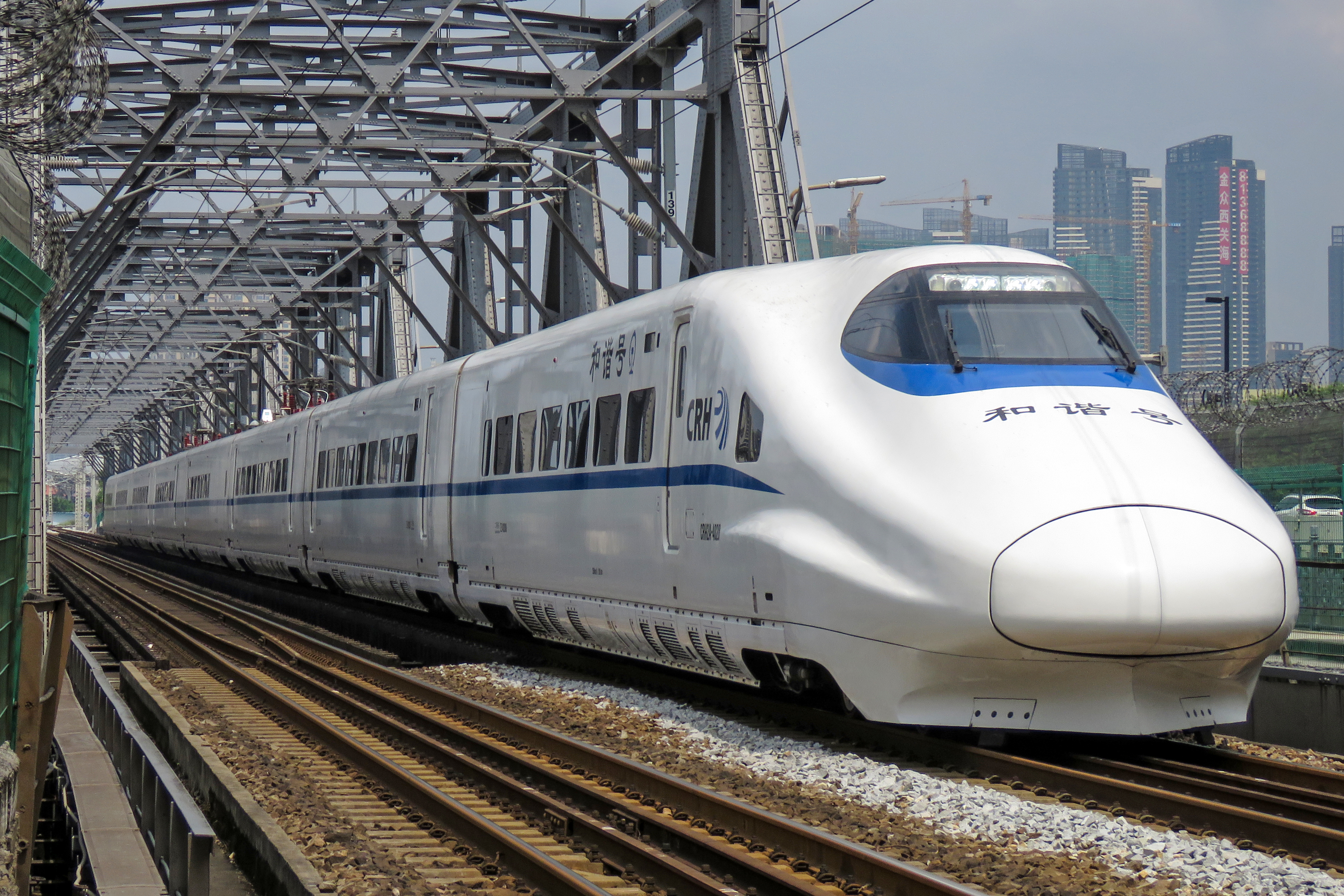
CRH2

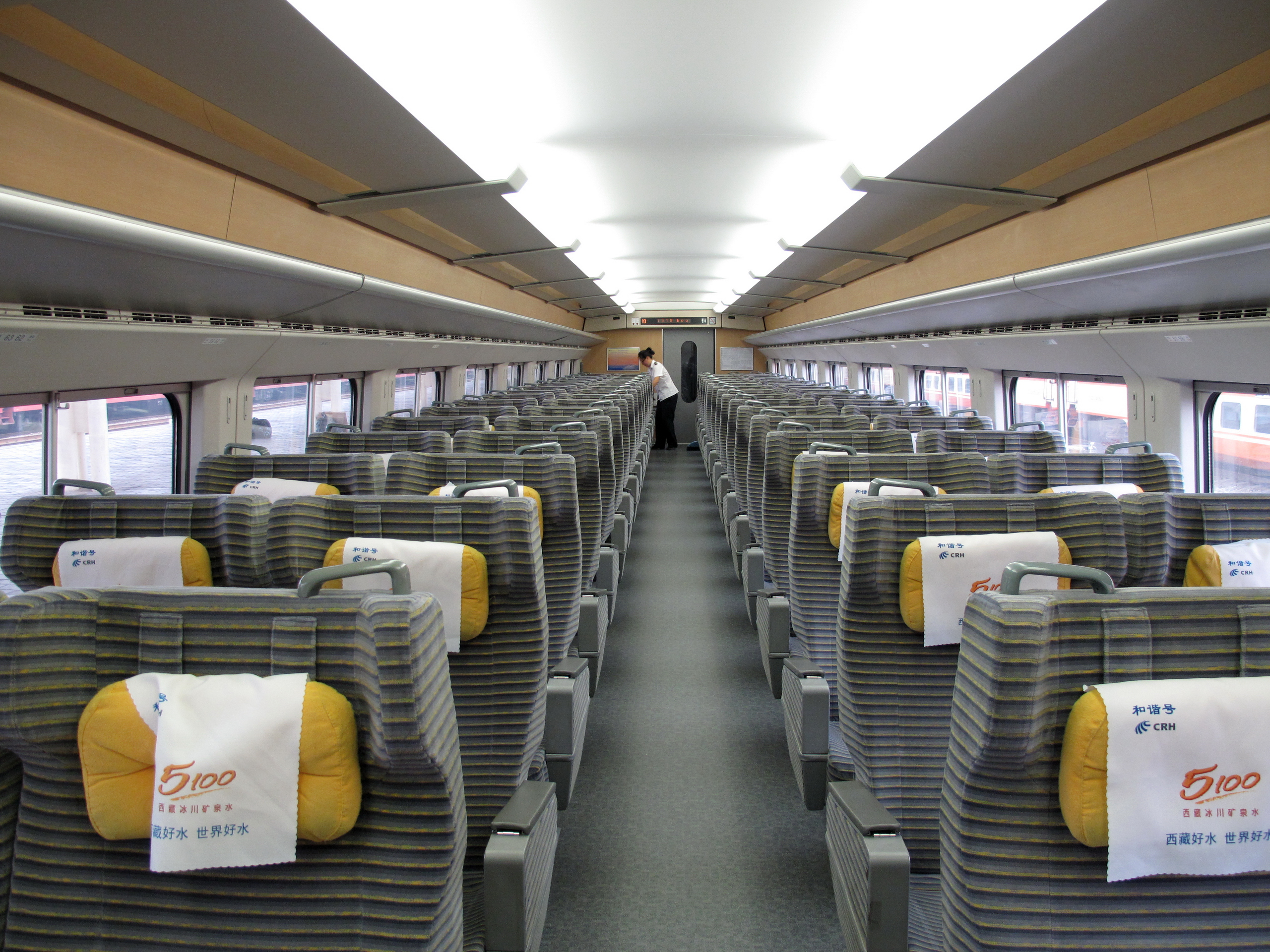
CRH2 First Class Coach

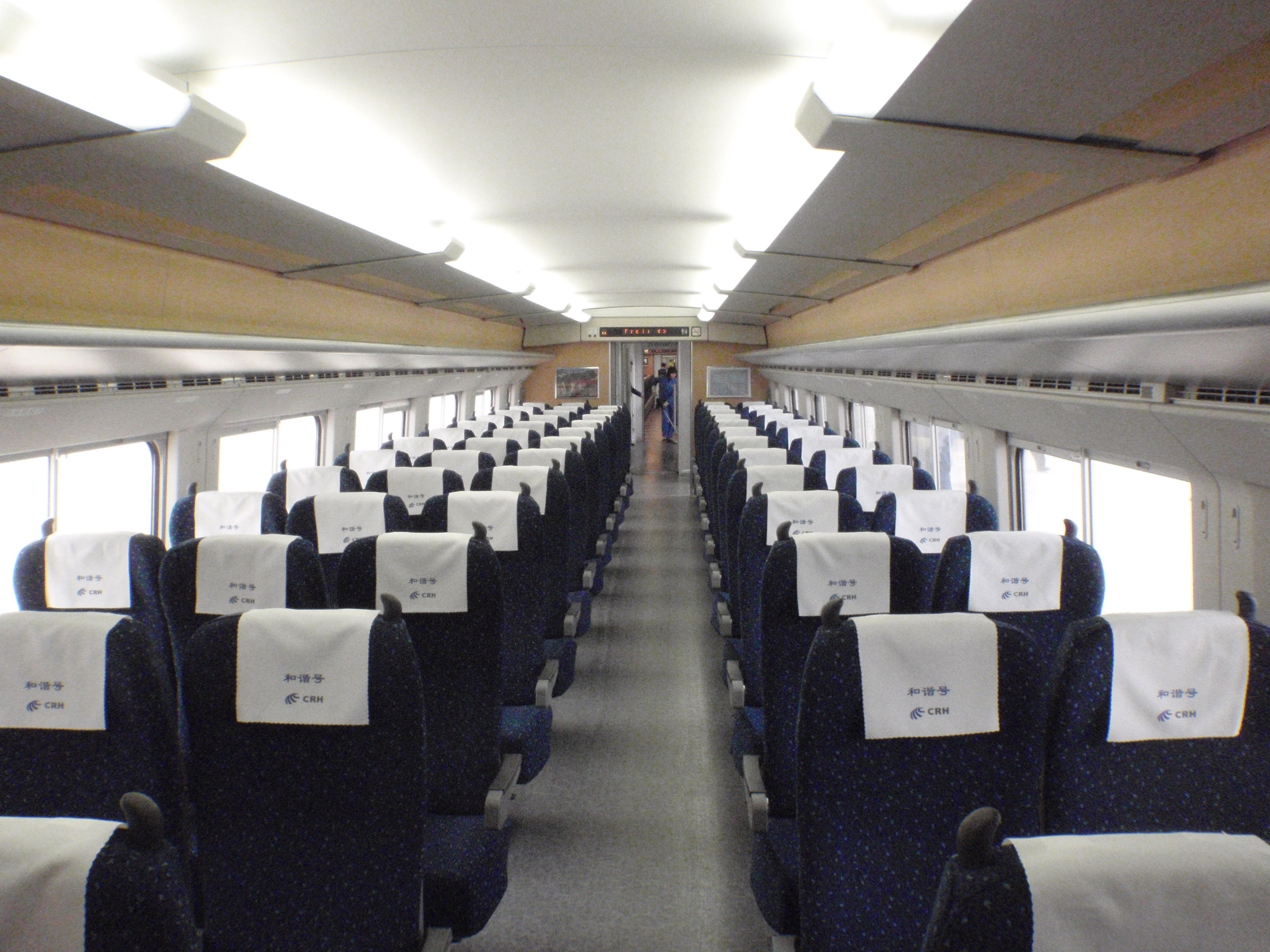
CRH2 Second Class Coach

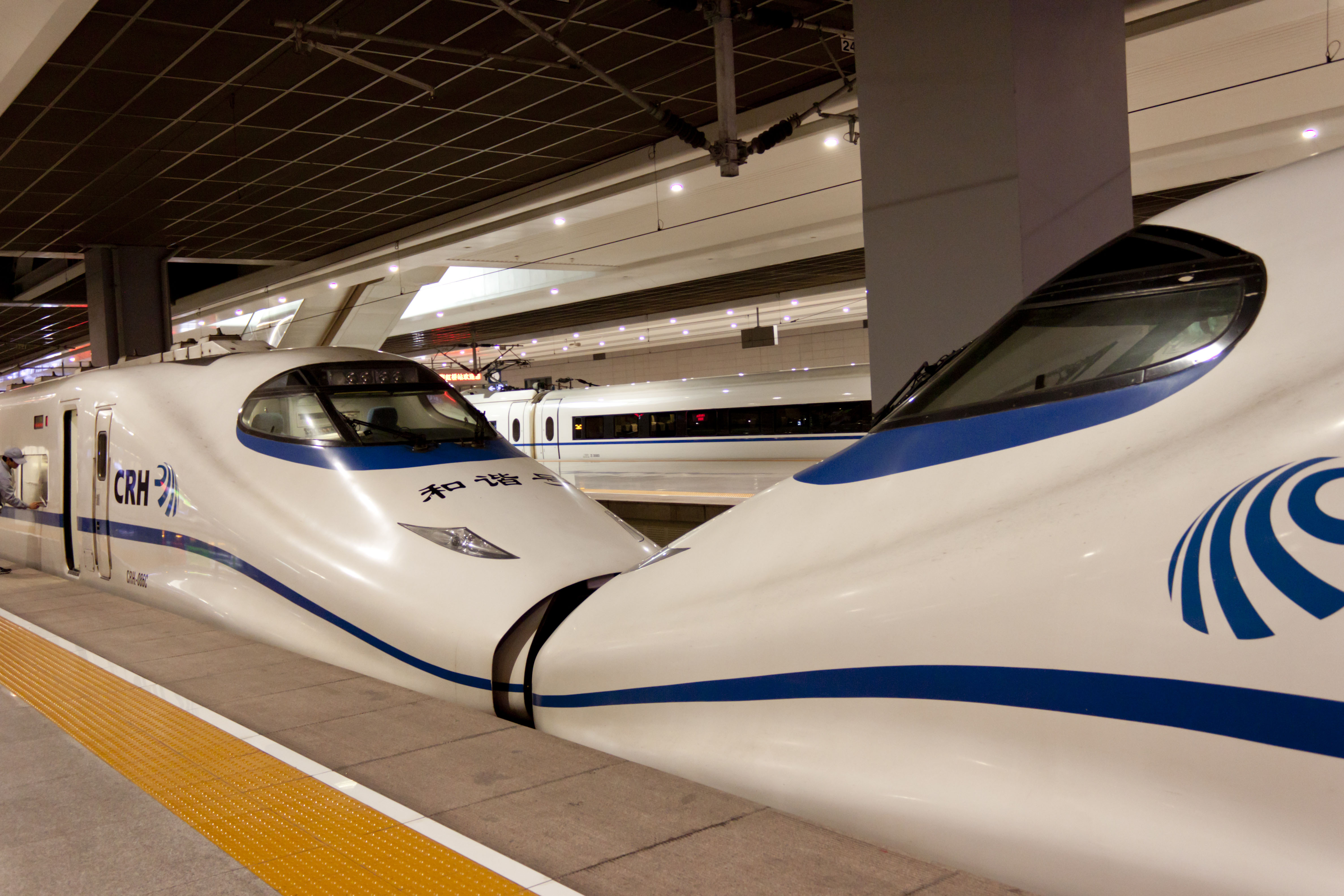
CRH2C at Shanghai Hongqiao railway station

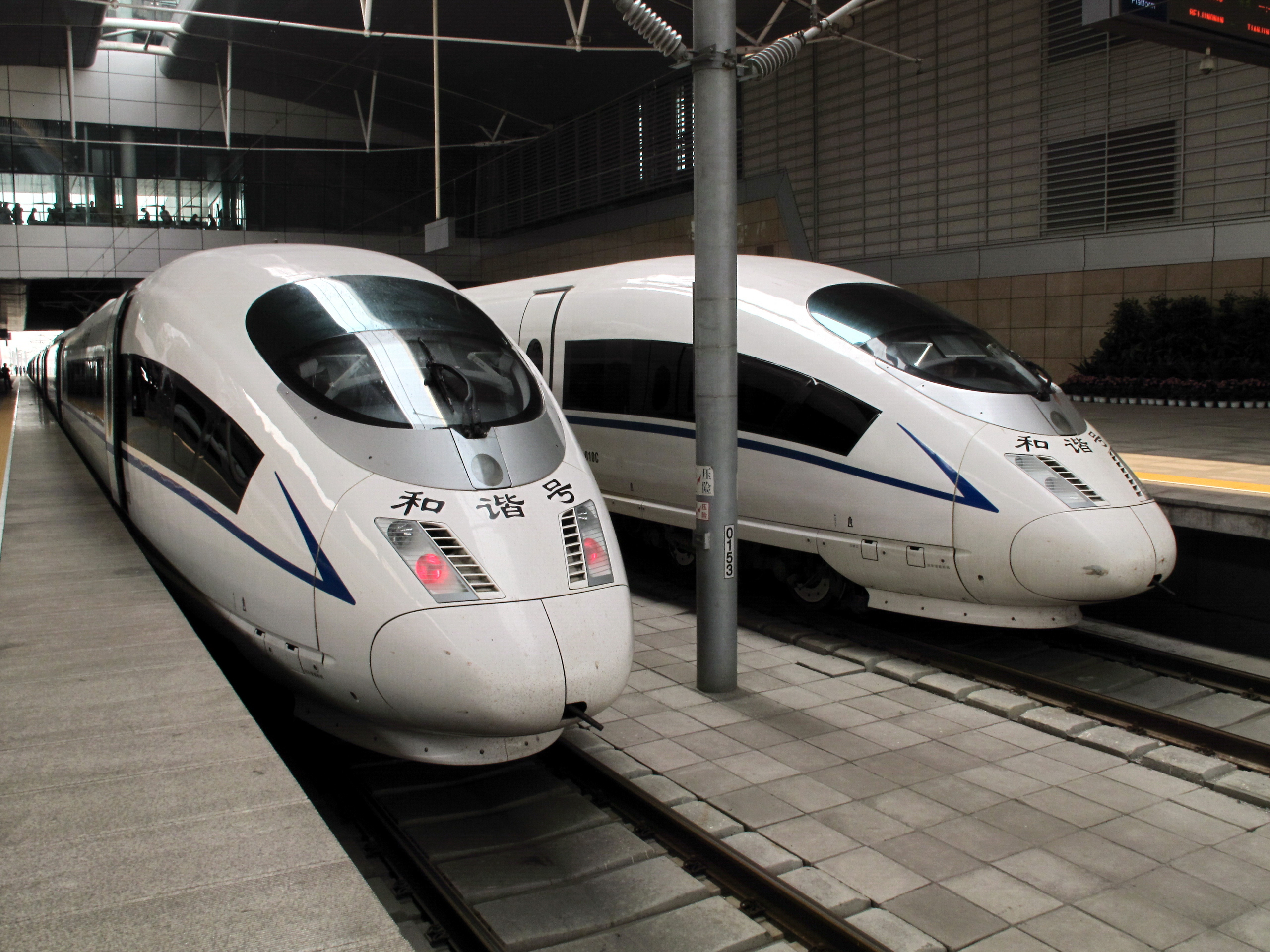
CRH3

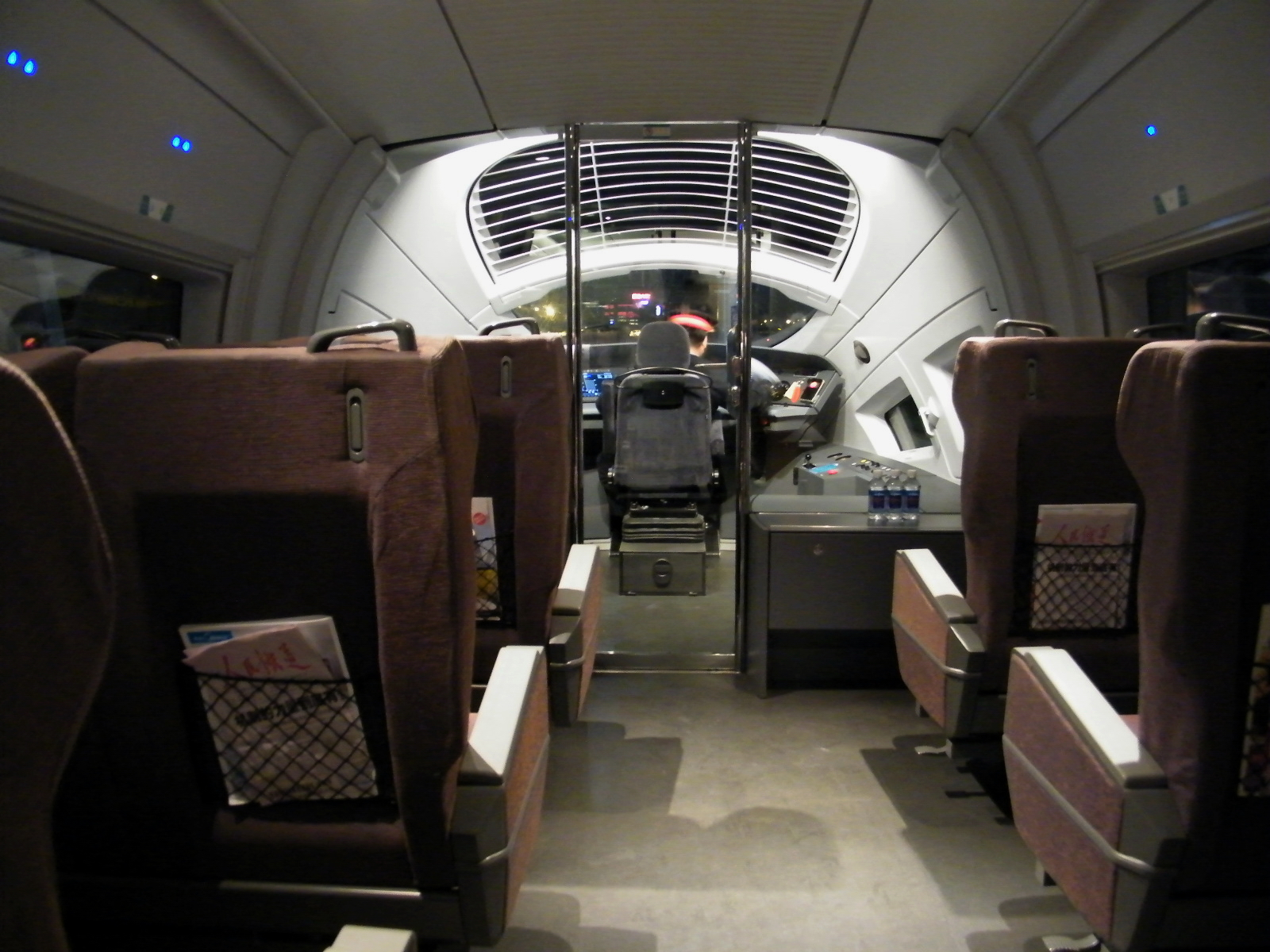
Premier-class cabin inside Beijing-Tianjin Intercity CRH3 train

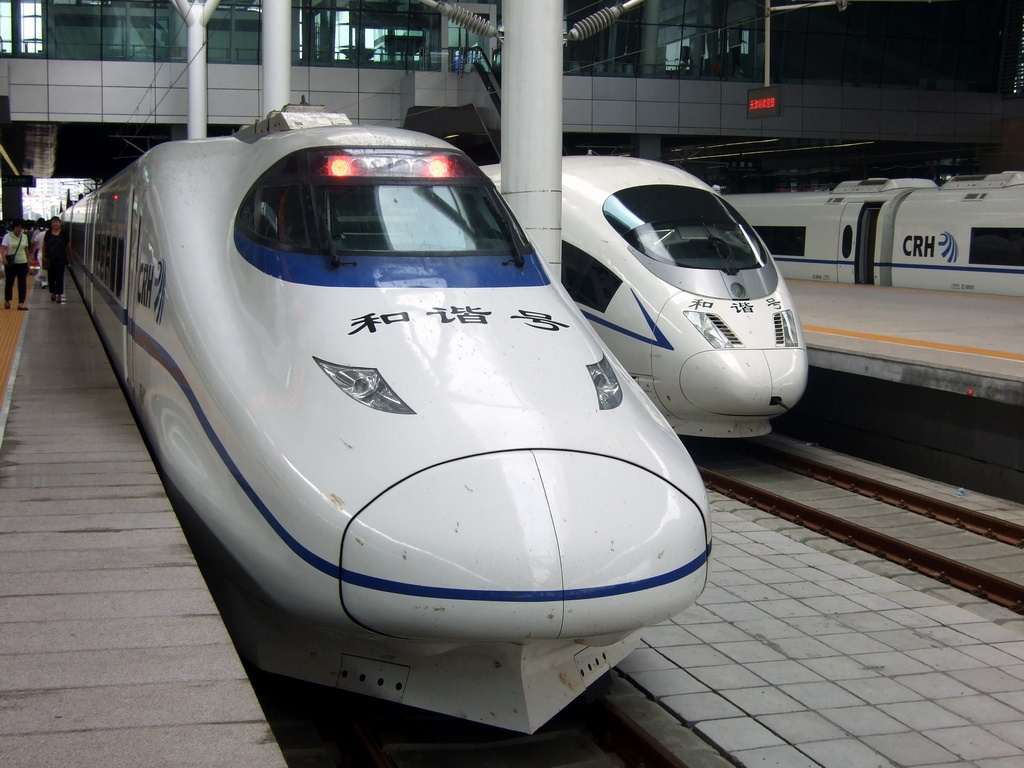
CRH2C and CRH3C at Tianjin railway station

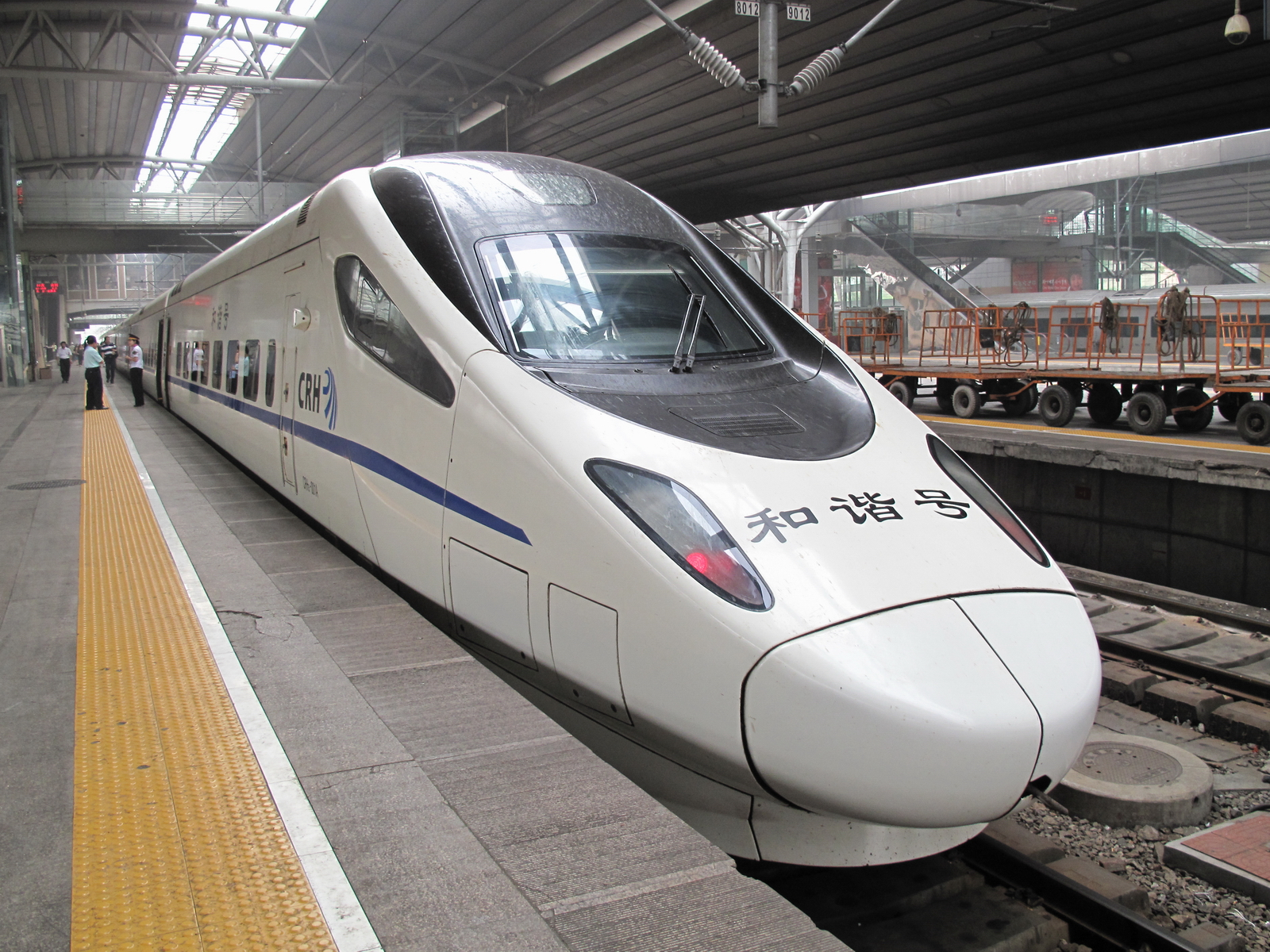
CRH5

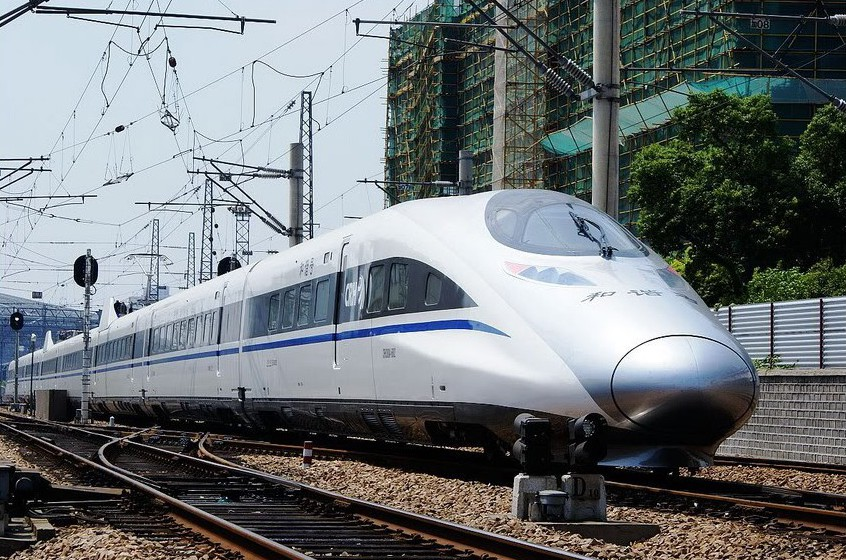
CRH380A

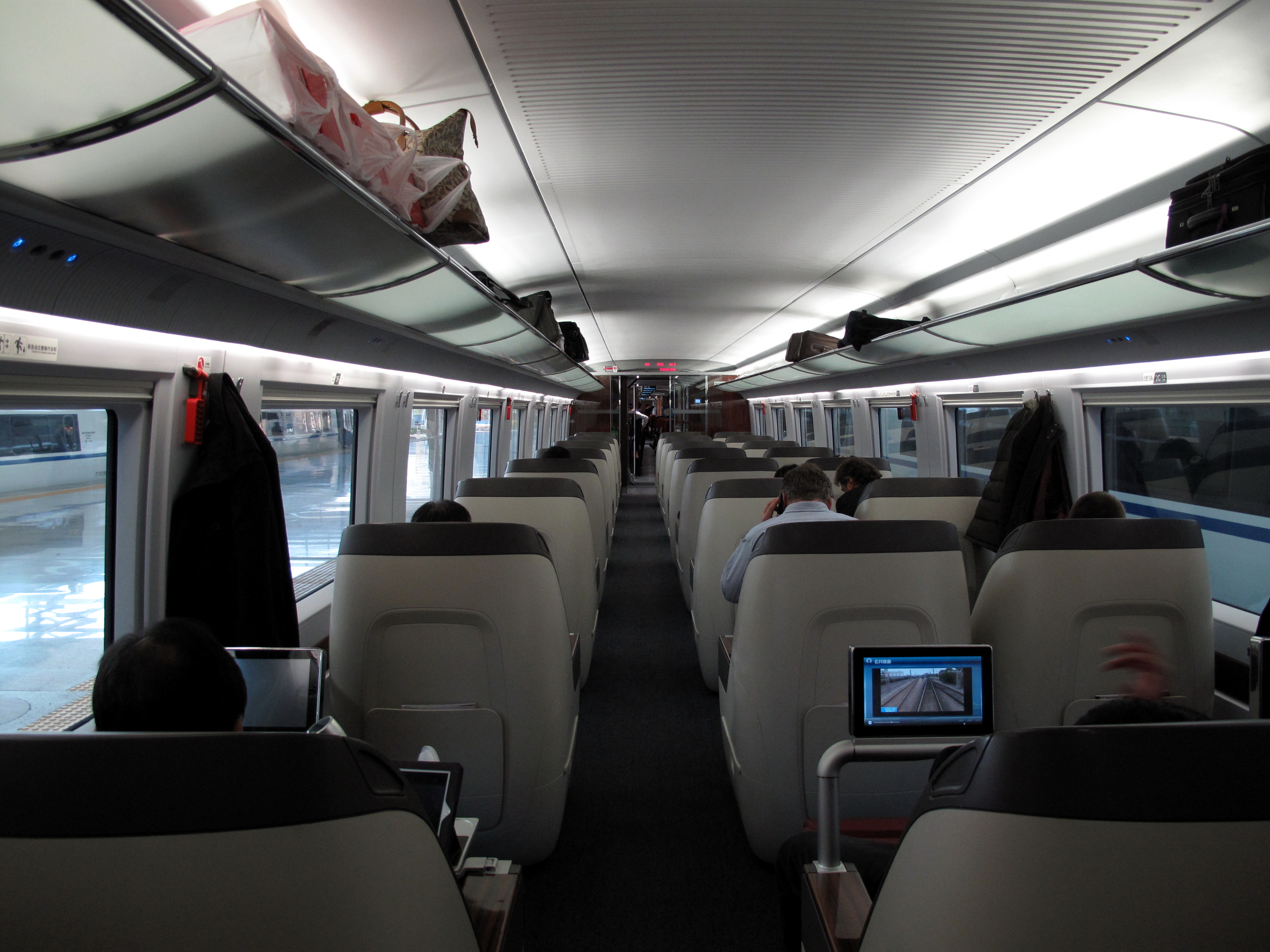
CRH380BL Business Coach

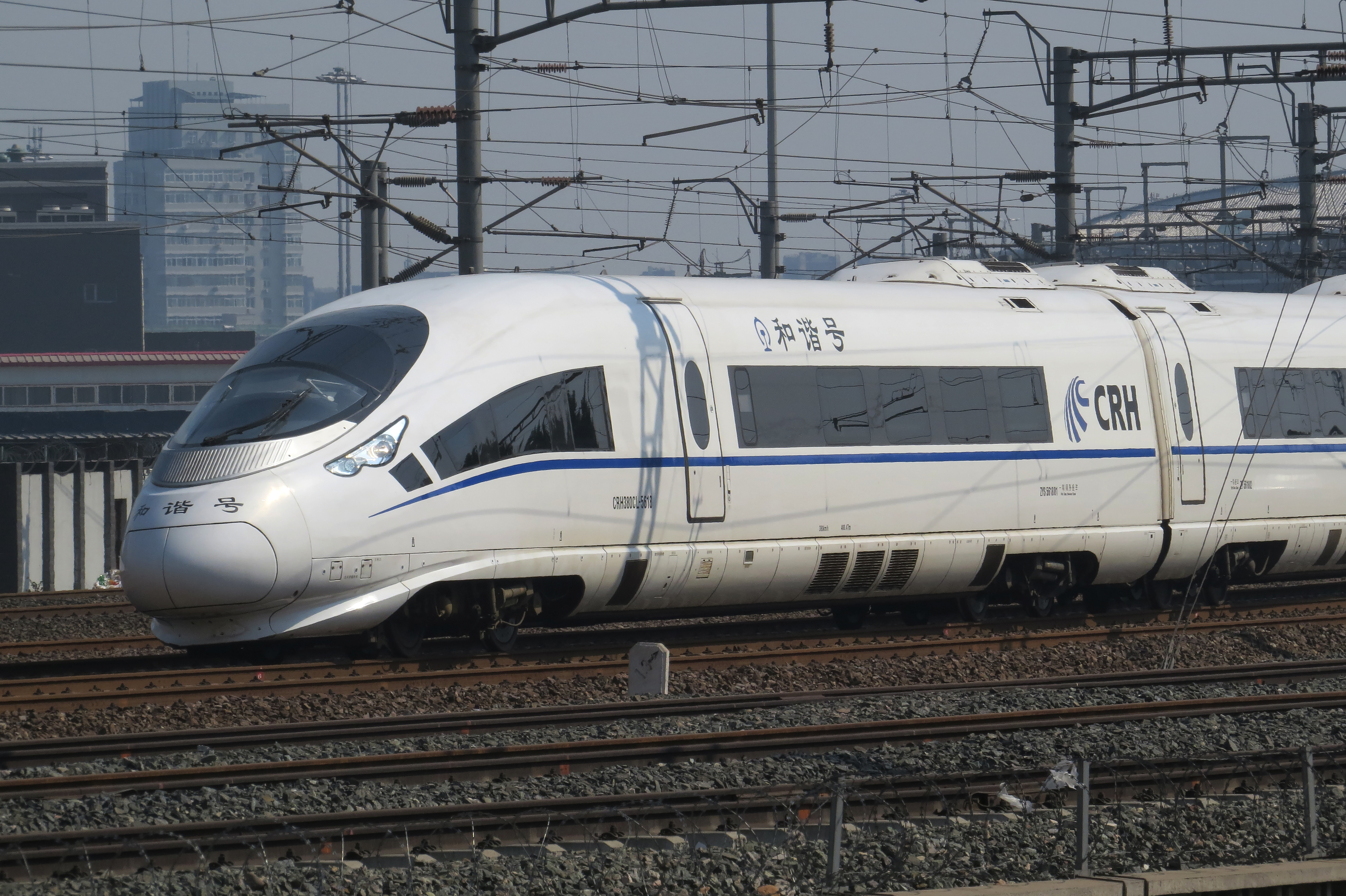
CRH380CL at Beijing South railway station

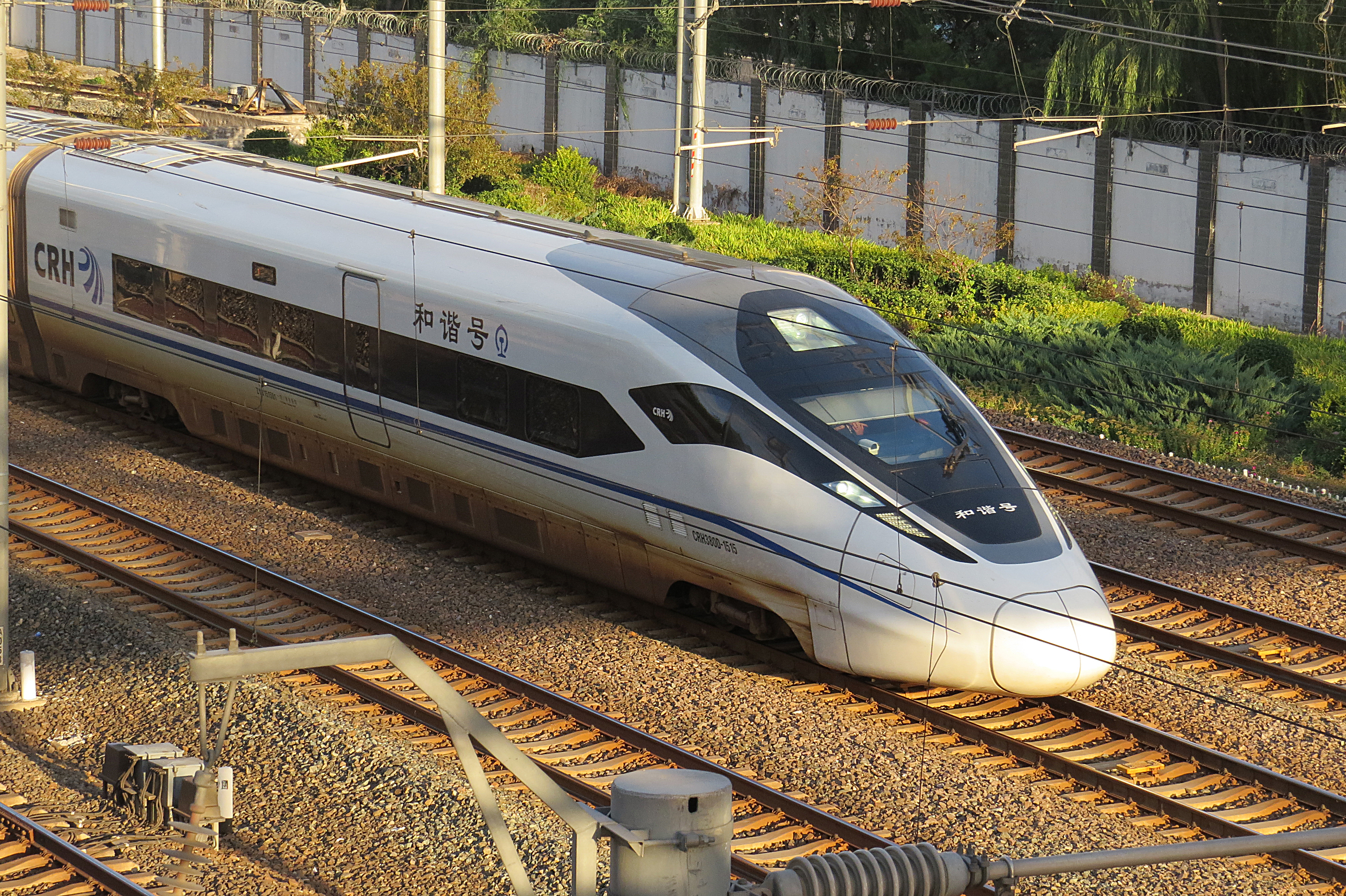
CRH380D at Beijing South railway station

== See also ==
- China Railway High-speed, Chinese high-speed railway service provided by China Railway.
- China Railway, Chinese state-owned corporation that operates nearly all Harmony trains.
- Fuxing (train), next-generation EMU developed by China with independent intellectual property rights.
