= China Railway CRH3 =

Chinese high-speed train

China Railways CRH3 EMU
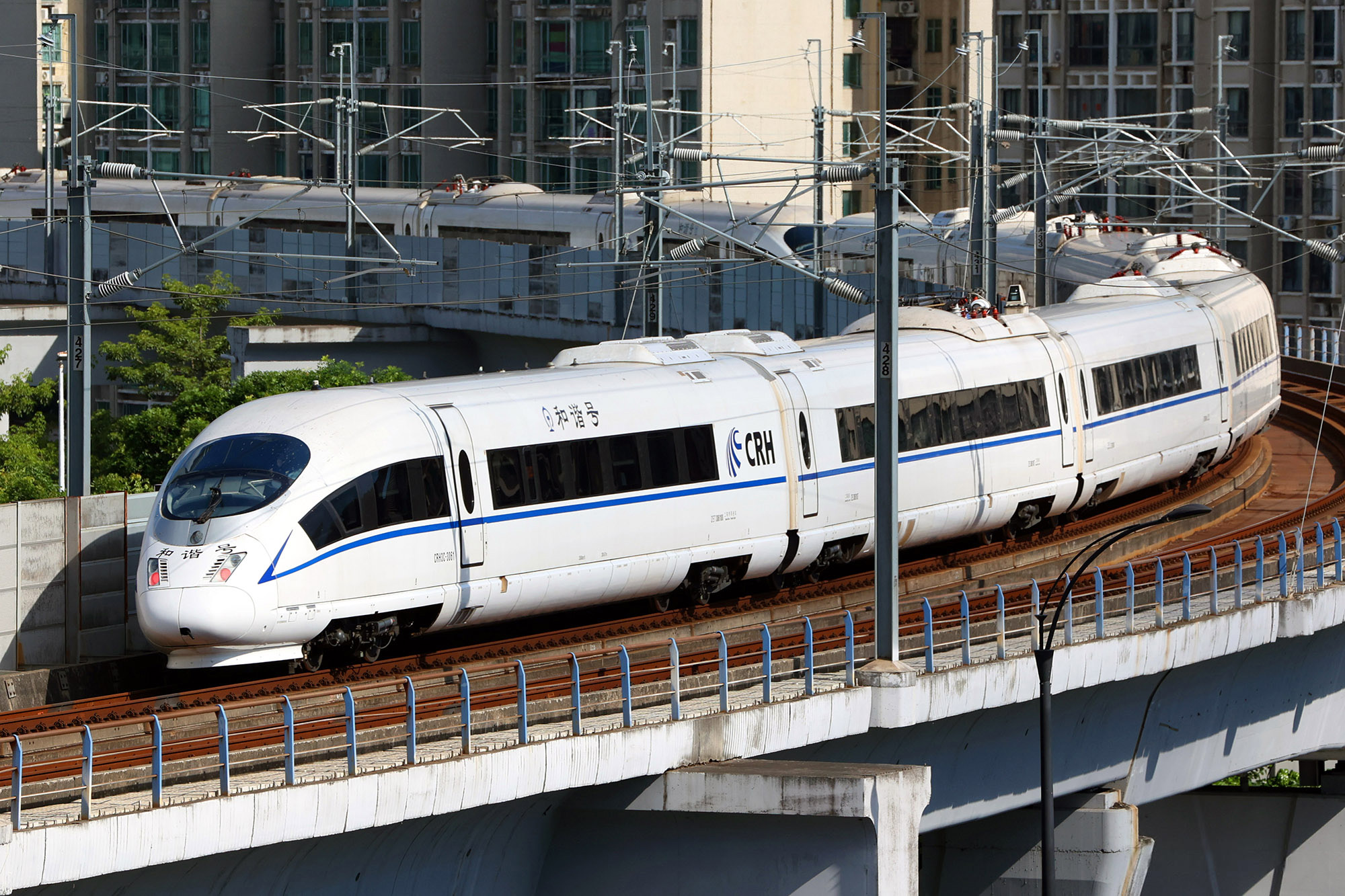
- CRH3C-3061
- In service: CRH3A: 4 October 2017; CRH3C: 1 August 2008; CRH380BG: 9 October 2012; CRH380B: 16 January 2014; CRH380BL: 13 January 2011; CRH380CL: 3 April 2013
- Manufacturers: Changchun Railway Vehicles; Hitachi; Siemens; Tangshan Railway Vehicle
- Family name: Hexie (CRH3A); Siemens Velaro (CRH3C/CRH380B/BL/BG/CRH380CL)
- Successor: CR400AF, CR400BF
- Formation: CRH3A (CNR), CRH3C (Siemens/CNR), CRH380B: 8 cars/trainset (4M4T); CRH3A–A, CRH3F: 4 cars/trainset (2M2T); CRH380BL, CRH380CL: 16 cars/trainset (8M8T)
- Capacity: CRH3A: 616; CRH3C (Siemens): 728; CRH3C (CNR): 556-601; CRH380B: 551; CRH380BL: 1043; CRH380CL: 1053
- Operator: China Railway Corporation

Specifications
- Train length: CRH3C (Siemens/CNR), CRH380B: 200 m (656 ft 2 in); CRH380BL: 399.27 m (1,309 ft 11 1/4 in)
- Width: 3,265 mm (10 ft 8 1/2 in)
- Height: 3,890 mm (12 ft 9 1/8 in)
- Platform height: 1,250 mm (4 ft 1 in)
- Maximum speed: CRH3C: 350 km/h (217 mph); 310 km/h (193 mph) (ATP); CRH380B, CRH380BL, CRH380CL: 380 km/h (236 mph); 310 km/h (193 mph) (ATP)
- Weight: CRH3C: 447 t (440 long tons; 493 short tons); CRH380BL: 980 t (960 long tons; 1,080 short tons)
- Traction system: Water cooling IGBT-VVVF inverter CRH3C: Siemens E1550 D2800/880 M5 rfaq or Beijing CARS Zongheng TKD500-2000; CRH380B, CRH380BL: Siemens E1550 D2800/880 M5 rfaq or Beijing CARS Zongheng TKD501/501A/501B/501C-2000; CRH380CL: Hitachi CII-HHR1460A
- Traction motors: 3-phase AC induction motor CRH3C: Siemens 1TB2019-0GC02 or CRRC Yongji Electric YJ-105A; CRH380B, CRH380BL: CRRC Yongji Electric YJ-105A1; CRH380BG: CRRC Yongji Electric YJ-105C; CRH380CL: CRRC Yongji Electric YJ-105B
- Power output: CRH3C (Siemens): 5.12 MW (6,866 hp); CRH3C (CNR): 8.8 MW (11,801 hp); CRH380B: 9.2 MW (12,337 hp); CRH380BL: 18.4 MW (24,675 hp); CRH380CL: 19.2 MW (25,748 hp)
- Transmission: AC-DC-AC
- Electric system: 25 kV 50 Hz ACOverhead line
- Current collection: Pantograph
- Braking systems: Regenerative, electronically controlled pneumatic brakes
- Track gauge: 1,435 mm (4 ft 8 1/2 in) standard gauge

The CRH3 Hexie (simplified Chinese: 和谐号; traditional Chinese: 和諧號; pinyin: Héxié Hào; lit. 'Harmony') is a version of the Siemens Velaro high-speed train used in China on the Beijing–Tianjin intercity railway line, Wuhan-Guangzhou Passenger Dedicated Line, Zhengzhou-Xi'an Passenger Dedicated Line and the Shanghai–Nanjing intercity railway. It is capable of service speed of 380 km/h (236 mph) as the very similar Velaro E used in Spain, but, similarly to the Sapsan, it is 300 mm (11.8 in) wider to take advantage of a more generous structure gauge and thus be able to fit in more seats in a 2+3 layout.

== Variants ==
In November 2005, the Ministry of Railways ordered 60 Velaro trains for use on the Beijing–Tianjin intercity railway line. On 27 July 2006, the joint project office was opened at Tangshan.

=== CRH3C Prototypes ===
The first three trains were built in Germany by Siemens, and these imported trains were labelled CRH3A (CRH3-002A, CRH3-003A and CRH3-004A), different than the CRH3A-5218 developed independently and manufactured by CRRC Changchun Railway Vehicles in 2017, designed to operate at a cruise speed of 250 km/h (155 mph). These trains are based on the German Deutsche Bahn's ICE 3 high-speed trains and were given initial designations of CRH3A. Of these German trains, the first one was shipped from Bremerhaven on 19 December 2007.

On 30 November 2012, the CNR announced new design of CRH3A, with three styles that can operate at top speed of 160 km/h (99 mph), 200 km/h (124 mph) and 250 km/h (155 mph). The first train was rolled out on 3 June 2013.

=== CRH3C ===
After December 2008, the three imported CRH3A were repainted and renamed to CRH3C (CRH3-002C, CRH3-003C and CRH3-004C). The last letter C means that each rolling stock of this model consists of 8 cars and runs with a maximum speed of 350 km/h (217 mph). The rest of the trains are now being built by Tangshan Railway Vehicle with some components from Germany.

The first Chinese-built CRH3 (CRH_{3}-001C) was unveiled on 11 April 2008.

The 8-car CRH3C trains are similar to the Velaro E design in Spain, but 300 mm (11.8 in) wider to fit more seats in a 2+3 layout; a 200 m (656 ft 2 in) CRH3 train will seat 572 passengers: 16 deluxe-class (8 sold publicly), 56 in first-class, 528 in second-class.

Each train sets consists of four motor cars and four trailer cars, equipped with two driving units, and each of them is in charge of the driving of two motor cars and two trailer cars.

The bogies are improved versions of the SF500 bogie. Innovations include the body bolster, vibration damper, spring parameters, transmission ratio, widening the carbody and increasing the speed of the trainsets.

The trains are designed for running at 350 km/h (217 mph). On 24 June 2008, CRH_{3}-001C reached a top speed of 394.3 km/h (245.0 mph) during a test on the Beijing to Tianjin high speed line.

On 9 December 2009, a pair of CRH3 EMUs (CRH_{3}-013C + CRH_{3}-017C) reached a top speed of 394.2 km/h (245 mph) during a test on the Zhengzhou to Xi'an high speed line, setting a world record for double-link EMUs.

On 28 September 2009, an additional 20 CRH3C sets was ordered by the Chinese MOR.

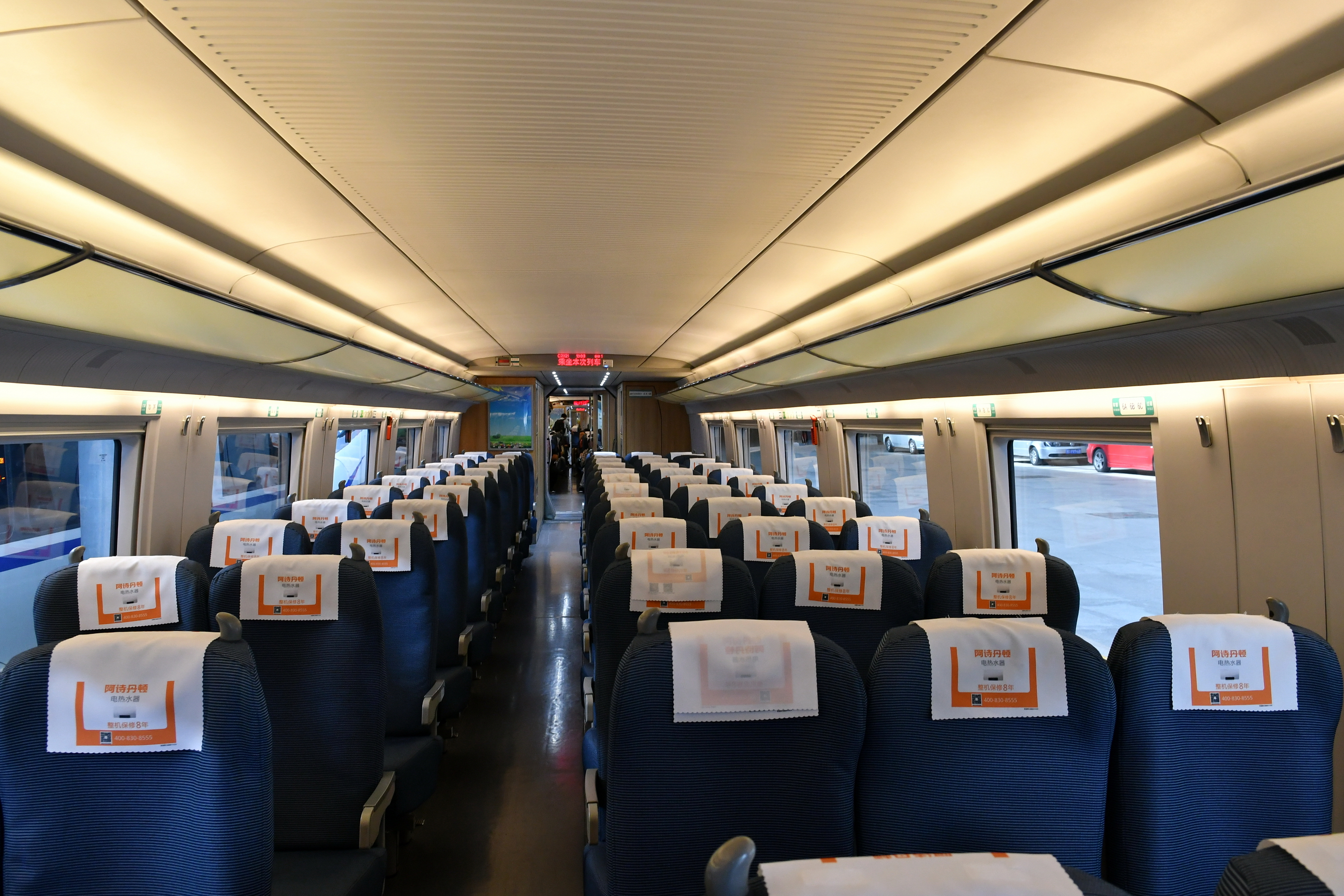
Inside a second class coach

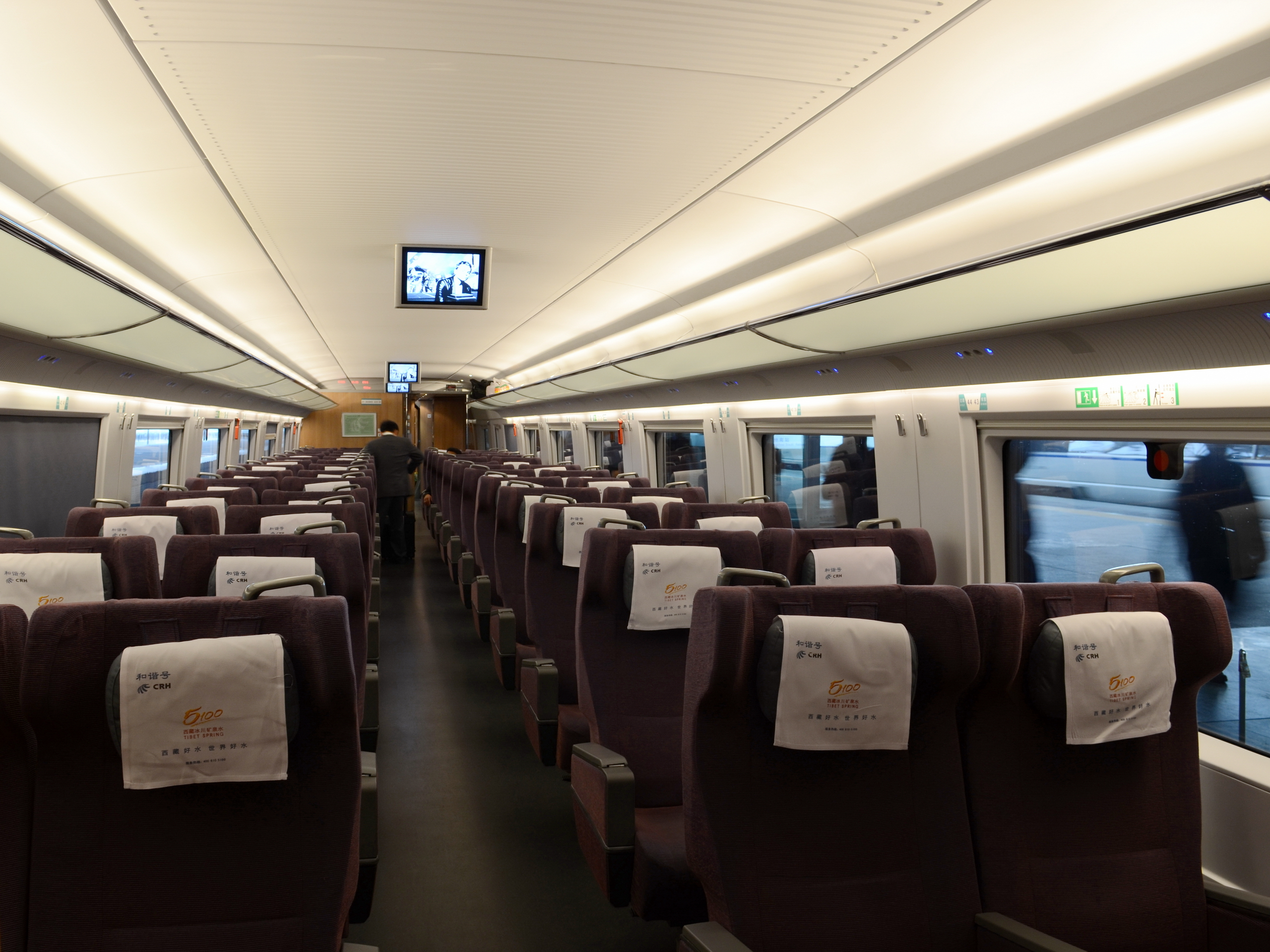
Inside a first class coach

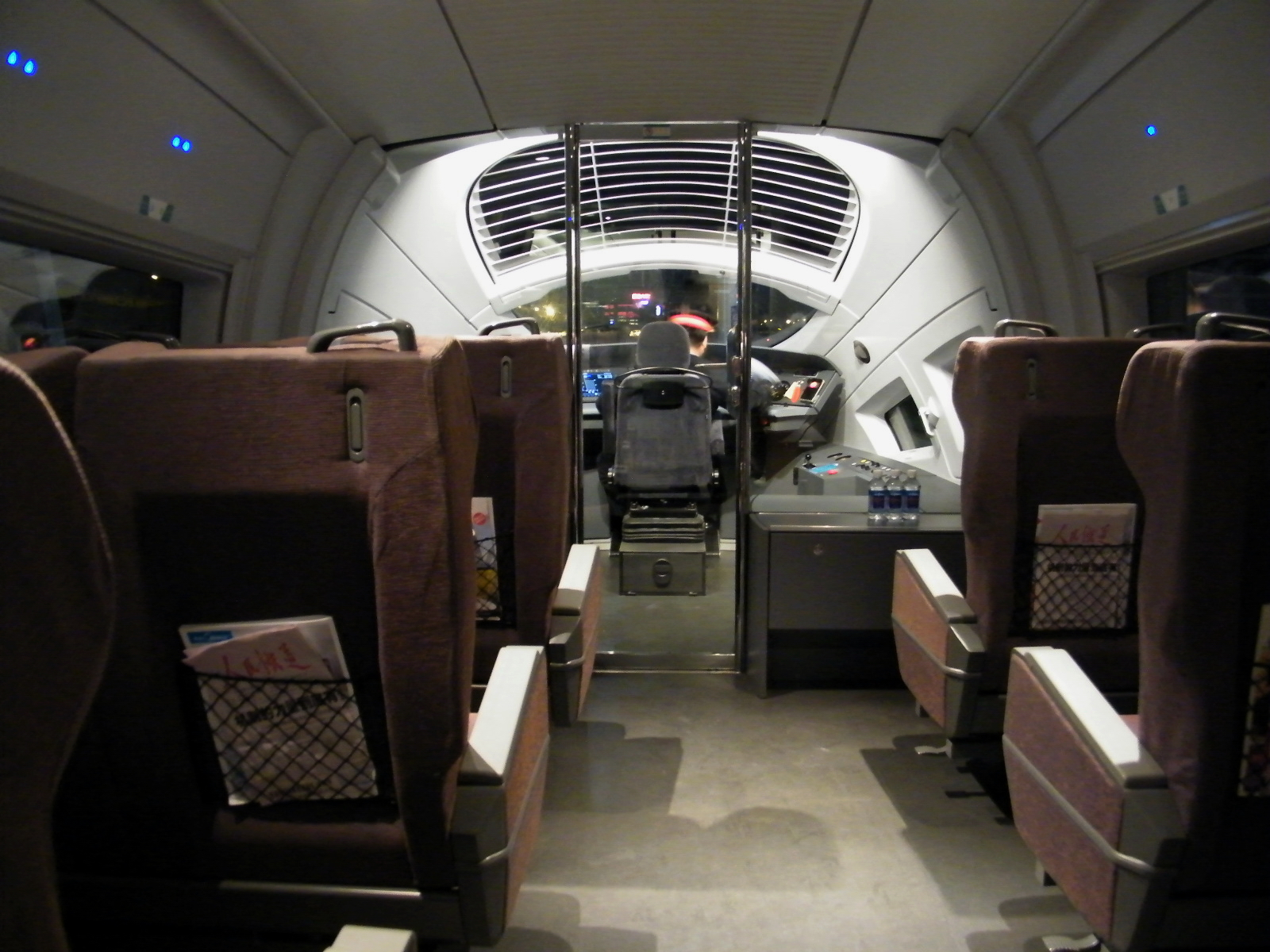
Premier class seats

=== CRH380B/BL ===
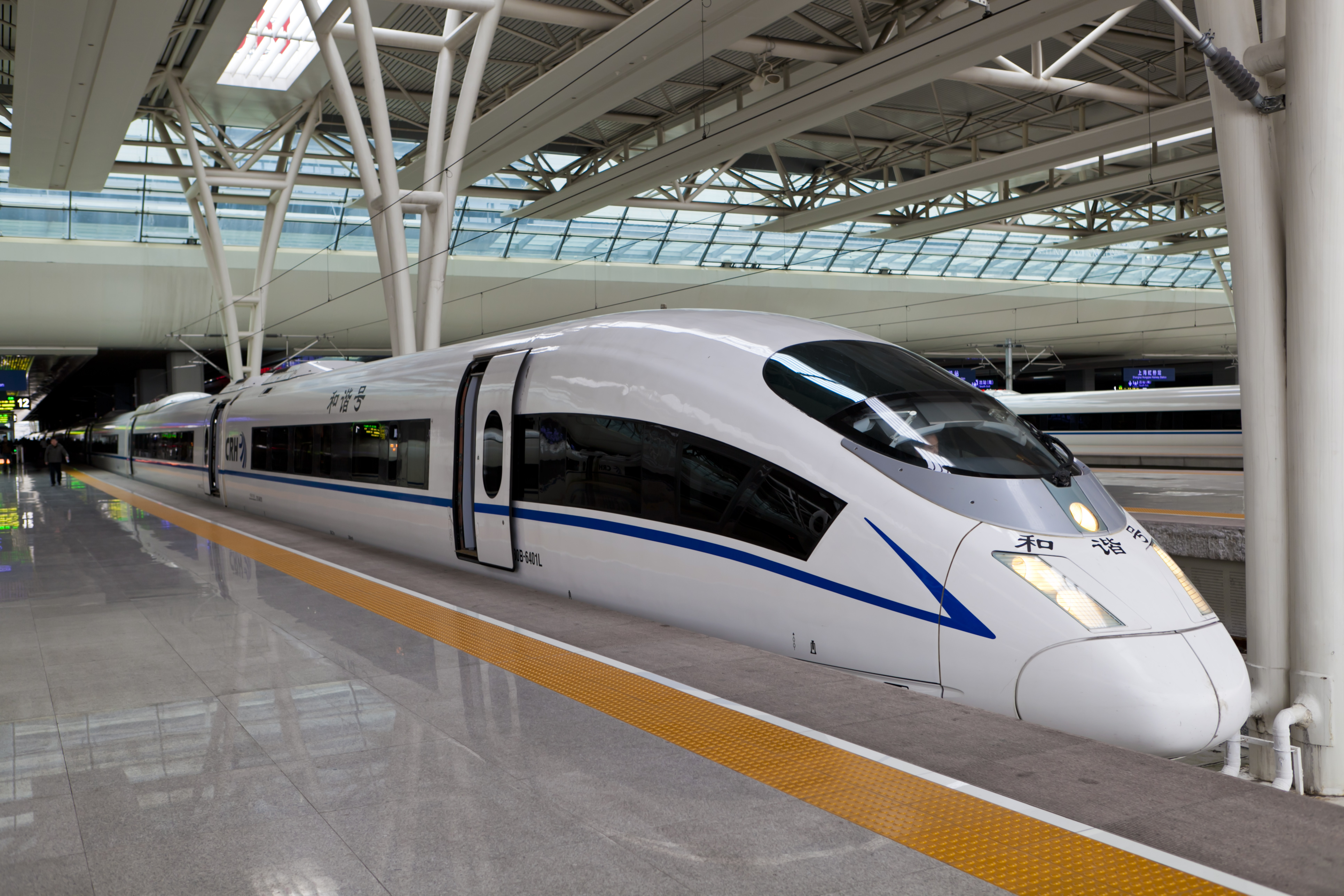
CRH380BL at Shanghai Hongqiao railway station

In March 2009, a new contract was signed with China Northern Railways (CNR) to supply 100 16-car trainsets for 39.2B RMB with delivery from October 2010 onwards. This order for a total of 1600 railway cars is greater than the total production of all Velaro and ICE trains that have ever been manufactured in the past. It is planned that the trains will be produced by CNR subsidiaries, Tangshan Railway Vehicle and Changchun Railway Vehicles, using technology from the previous technology transfer agreement. In this contract, Siemens acts as a component supplier, with over 80% of the contract supplied by CNR. An additional order for 40 16-car sets and 40 8-car sets was made on 28 September 2009 for 25.32B RMB.

Top travel speed for this variant is 380 km/h (236 mph), though it is capable of attaining even higher speeds. These trains have been designated as CRH380B (8-car set) and CRH380BL (16-car set) in September 2010. The first CRH380BL set with series number CRH380B-6401L rolled off the production line and was unveiled to the public in September 2010. it was manufactured by Tangshan Railway Vehicle. In October 2010, the 16-car train was sent to Beijing loop line for test. In November 2010, the train was sent to Beijing-Shanghai High-Speed Railway for trial run. The trainset reached the maximum speed of 457 km/h (284 mph) on 5 December 2010. More recently, during a subsequent test on 10 January 2011, a CRH380BL set reached a new record speed of 487.3 km/h (302.8 mph), breaking the previous record held by the CRH380A.

Since 13 January 2011, the CRH380BL enter regular service at the Shanghai–Hangzhou High-Speed Railway and Shanghai–Nanjing High-Speed Railway.

All 54 CRH380BL trainsets were recalled in mid-August 2011 due to operational problems on the new Beijing–Shanghai High-Speed Railway. The new trains were reported as being "too sensitive" and the subject of frequent breakdowns in stormy weather. They were temporarily replaced by the CRH380A and CRH380AL. The recalled trainsets returned to service in December 2011.

=== CRH380CL ===
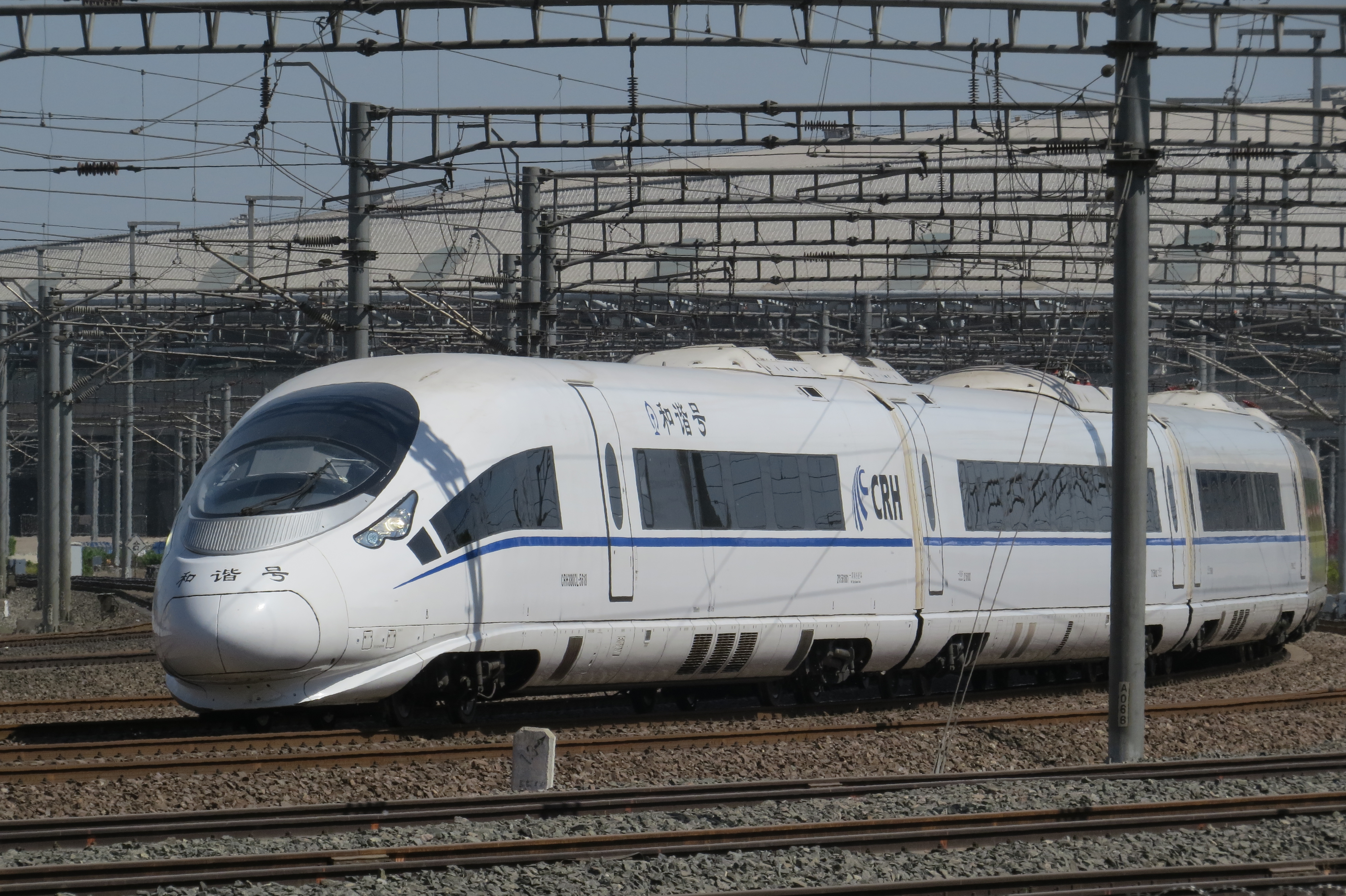
CRH380CL

CRH380CL is a modified CRH380BL with a redesigned nose and electrical equipment from Hitachi. 25 16-car trainsets have been ordered by the MOR, replacing 25 previously ordered CRH380BL units. The first trainset was delivered and underwent testing in 2011. The trains entered regular service in the Spring of 2013.

=== CRH3A ===
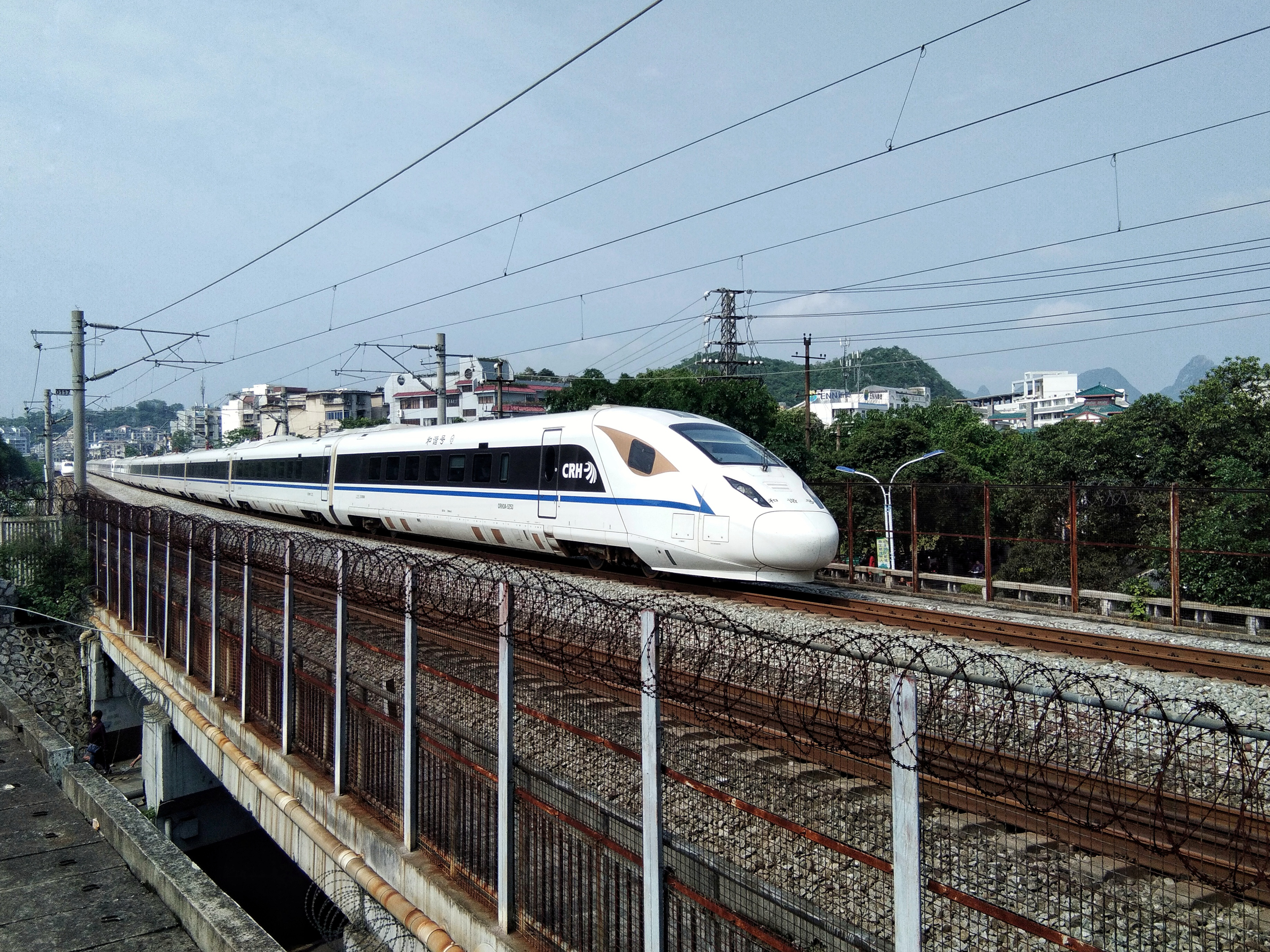
CRH3A

The CRH3A is based on CJ1 (which in itself is derived from the CRH380B/BL/CL) and CRH5. It was designed for operation on passenger dedicated lines and intercity railways at speeds between 160 km/h (99 mph) and 250 km/h (155 mph). The first sets where unveiled for public service on 6 December 2017 on the Xi'an–Chengdu HSR which opened a few days later.

=== CRH3X ===
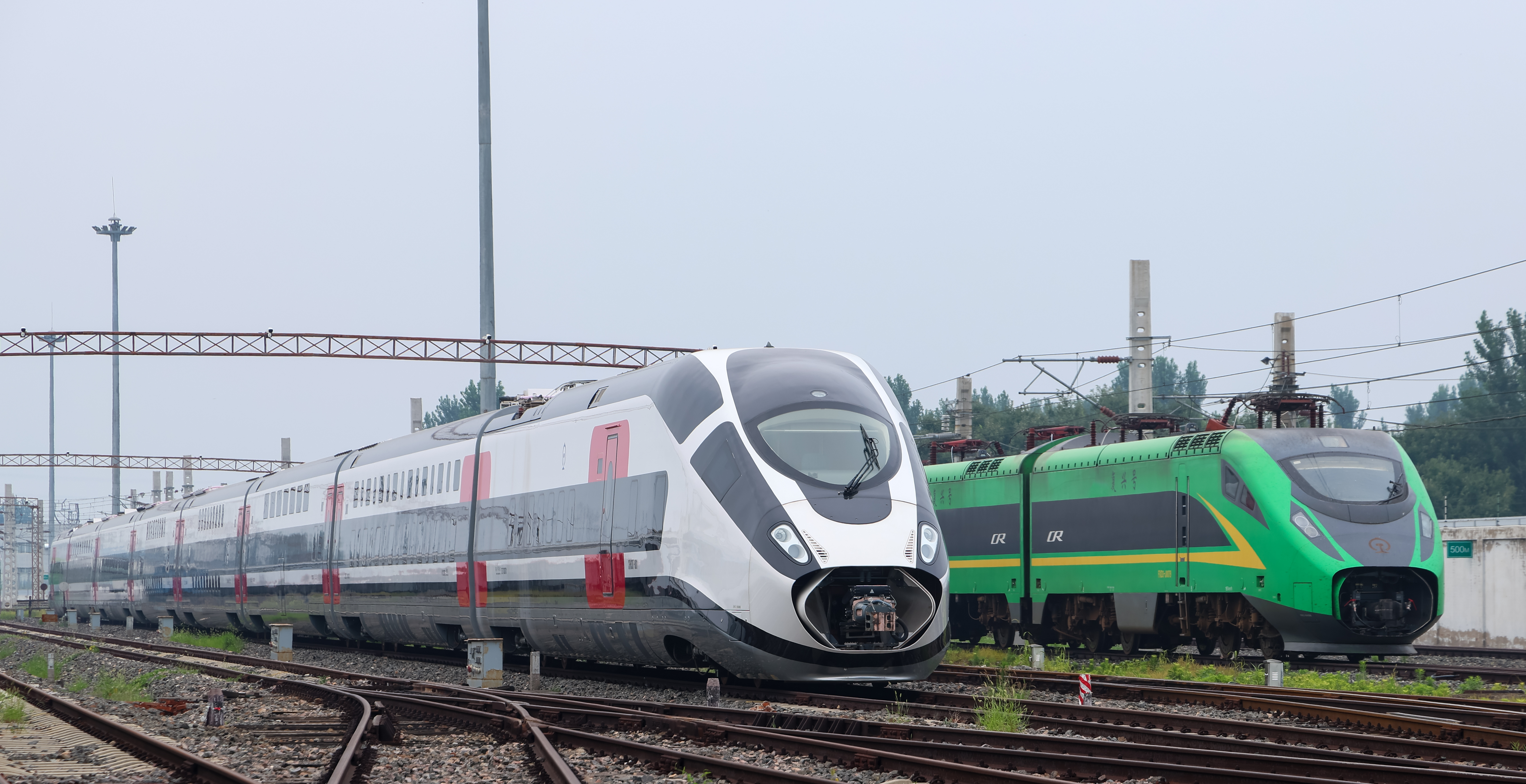
A CRH3X (left) and CR200J power car (right) at CRRC Tangshan

A prototype highspeed train being developed at CRRC Tangshan capable of cars in a trainset to be swapped out according to demand. Two platforms are being developed for 250 km/h (155 mph) and 350 km/h (217 mph) operation. Trains can be adjusted to be between 2 and 16 cars long with capability to swap in double deck passenger cars, restaurant and freight cars according to demand.

== Formation ==
Power Destination

- M – Motor car
- T – Trailer car
- C – Driver cabin
- P – Pantograph

Coach Type

- SW – Business Class Coach
- ZY – First Class Coach
- ZE – Second Class Coach
- CA – Dining Car
- ZEC – Second Class Coach/Buffet Car
- ZES – Second Class/Business Coach
- ZYS – First Class/Business Coach
- ZYG – First Class Coach/Sightseeing Car
- ZET – Second Class Coach/Premier Coach
- ZYT – First Class Coach/Premier Coach

=== CRH3C ===
Coach No.	1	2	3	4	5	6	7	8
Type	ZET	ZE		ZEC	ZY	ZE		ZET
Power Configuration	MC	TP	M	T		M	TP	MC
Power Units	Unit 1				Unit 2			
Capacity	60+8	80		50		80		60+8

- Train No. 3001–3080

=== CRH380B ===
Coach No.	1	2	3	4	5	6	7	8
Type	ZYS	ZE			ZEC	ZE		ZES
Power Configuration	MC	TP	M	T		M	TP	MC
Power Units	Unit 1				Unit 2			
Capacity	28+5	85		75	63	85		40+5

- Train No. 3571-3731, 3738–3754, 5637–5681, 5730–5761, 5787–5802, 5829–5888

=== CRH380BG ===
Coach No.	1	2	3	4	5	6	7	8
Type	ZYT	ZE			ZEC	ZE		ZET
Power Configuration	MC	TP	M	T		M	TP	MC
Power Units	Unit 1				Unit 2			
Capacity ^{1}	44+8	80		71	40	80		60+8
Capacity ^{2}	28+5	85		75	63	85		40+5

- ^1Train No. 5546–5585
- ^2Train No. 5586-5600, 5626–5636, 5684–5729, 5762–5786, 5803–5822

=== CRH380BL ===
Coach No.	1	2	3	4	5	6	7	8	9	10	11	12	13	14	15	16
Type ^{1}	ZYS	ZY	SW	ZY	ZE				ZEC	ZE						ZYS
Type ^{2}	ZYS	ZY		ZE					CA	ZE						ZYS
Power Configuration	MC	TP	M	T		M	TP	M		TP	M	T		M	TP	MC
Power Units	Unit 1				Unit 2				Unit 3				Unit 4			
Capacity^{1}	2+37	56	24	56	71	80			/	80						2+37
Capacity^{2}	3+13	56		80	71	80			/	80						3+13

- ^1Train No. 3501-3543, 5501–5545
- ^2Train No. 3544-3570, 3732–3737, 5823–5828

=== CRH380CL ===
Coach No.	1	2	3	4	5	6	7	8	9	10	11	12	13	14	15	16
Type ^{1}	ZYG	ZY	SW	ZY	ZE				CA	ZE						ZYG
Type ^{2}	ZYS	ZY		ZE					CA	ZE						ZYS
Power Configuration	MC	TP	M	T		M	TP	M		TP	M	T		M	TP	MC
Power Units	Unit 1				Unit 2				Unit 3				Unit 4			
Capacity^{1}	2+37	56	24	56	71	80			/	80						2+37
Capacity^{2}	3+13	56		80	71	80			/	80						3+13

- ^1Train No. 5601
- ^2Train No. 5602–5625

== Distribution ==
As of August 2017, there are 80 CRH3C series EMU, 661 CRH380B series EMU and 25 CRH380C series EMU in service.

Operator	Quantity	Serial number	Depot	Notes
CRH3A
CR Chengdu	59	3081-3111, 5230-5257	Chengdu East	
CRH3A-A
—N/a	1	0510	—N/a	
CRH3A-A
CR Chengdu	11	0512-0522	Guiyang North	
CRH3C
CR Guangzhou	21	3024, 3029, 3030, 3034, 3036, 3039, 3040, 3042, 3043, 3047, 3059–3061, 3063, 3065, 3066, 3068, 3069, 3072, 3076, 3080	Changsha	
CR Guangzhou	12	3023, 3025, 3027, 3028, 3045, 3052, 3064, 3067, 3070, 3071, 3073, 3074	Changsha West	
CR Chengdu	15	3005, 3006, 3022, 3026, 3031–3033, 3035, 3038, 3041, 3046, 3050, 3051, 3062, 3075	Chongqing North	
CR Chengdu	32	3001-3004, 3007–3021, 3037, 3044, 3048, 3049, 3053–3058, 3077-3079	Chongqing West	
CRH380BG
CR Shenyang	36	5548-5555, 5558, 5559, 5562–5564, 5567–5569, 5572–5577, 5580, 5583–5587, 5595, 5596, 5684, 5685, 5689, 5713, 5774, 5815	Changchun	
CR Shenyang	28	5686-5688, 5699, 5700, 5703, 5704, 5706–5709, 5724, 5725, 5728, 5729, 5763–5766, 5803, 5808–5812, 5817-5819	Dalian	
CR Shenyang	24	5697, 5698, 5701, 5702, 5705, 5710, 5712, 5715, 5716, 5719, 5720, 5723, 5762, 5767–5771, 5775, 5777, 5806, 5813, 5814, 5816	Shenyang North	
CR Shenyang	9	5690, 5772, 5773, 5776, 5783, 5784, 5804, 5805, 5807	Shenyang South	
CR Harbin	60	5546, 5547, 5556, 5557, 5560, 5561, 5565, 5566, 5570, 5571, 5578, 5579, 5581, 5582, 5588–5594, 5597–5600, 5626–5636, 5691–5696, 5711, 5714, 5717, 5718, 5721, 5722, 5726, 5727, 5778–5782, 5785, 5786, 5820-5822	Harbin West	
CRH380B
CR Shanghai	44	3573, 3581, 3585, 3589, 3593, 3594, 3603, 3604, 3606, 3609, 3611, 3618, 3619, 3623, 3626, 3629, 3634, 3640–3645, 3652, 3653, 3655, 3663, 3673, 3674, 3678, 3682, 3704, 3713–3719, 3721, 3728, 3739, 3741, 3743, 3752	Hefei South	
CR Shanghai	31	3572, 3575, 3580, 3583, 3586, 3590, 3591, 3595, 3598, 3600–3602, 3605, 3607, 3612–3615, 3620, 3633, 3639, 3676, 3677, 3705, 3720, 3724, 3729, 3738, 3745, 3753	Xuzhou East	
CR Guangzhou	57	3577-3579, 3596, 3597, 3599, 3608, 3616, 3621, 3622, 3625, 3628, 3630, 3631, 3635, 3636, 3638, 3646–3648, 3650, 3651, 3654, 3656, 3658–3661, 3670, 3671, 3675, 3681, 3683–3690, 3698–3701, 3706–3708, 3710, 3722, 3725, 3727, 3744, 3746–3749, 3760	Changsha	
CR Beijing	19	5657-5669, 5671, 5738-5742	Beijing South	
CR Jinan	29	5643, 5644, 5646, 5650, 5672, 5673, 5679, 5681–5683, 5744, 5747, 5751, 5761, 5794, 5797, 5847, 5852, 5855, 5859, 5860, 5867–5870, 5881-5884	Qingdao North	
CR Jinan	28	5638, 5651, 5655, 5674, 5677, 5678, 5745, 5746, 5748, 5749, 5752, 5753, 5758–5760, 5789, 5796, 5799, 5800, 5830–5833, 5843, 5853, 5854, 5857, 5858	Jinan	
CR Zhengzhou	47	5649, 5653, 5654, 5670, 5676, 5680, 5733, 5735, 5736, 5756, 5757, 5787, 5788, 5790, 5791, 5795, 5801, 5802, 5835, 5837–5842, 5850, 5851, 5856, 5861–5866, 5872–5880, 5885-5888	Zhengzhou East	
CR Xi'an	55	3571, 3574, 3576, 3582, 3584, 3588, 3592, 3610, 3617, 3627, 3632, 3637, 3649, 3657, 3662, 3664, 3665, 3667–3669, 3672, 3680, 3691, 3692, 3694, 3697, 3709, 3712, 3723, 3726, 3730, 3731, 3740, 3742, 3750, 3751, 3754–3759, 3761–3771, 3773, 3774	Xi'an North	
CR Lanzhou	30	5637, 5639–5642, 5645, 5647, 5648, 5652, 5656, 5675, 5730–5732, 5734, 5737, 5743, 5750, 5754, 5792, 5793, 5798, 5834, 5836, 5844–5846, 5848, 5849, 5871	Lanzhou West	
CR Lanzhou	12	3624, 3666, 3679, 3693, 3695, 3696, 3702, 3703, 3711, 3772, 5755, 5829	Yinchuan	
CRH380BL
CR Shanghai	20	3504, 3505, 3510, 3516, 3517, 3519–3522, 3525, 3527, 3529, 3531, 3533, 3535, 3536, 3538–3540, 3542	Shanghai Hongqiao	
CR Shanghai	9	3547, 3550, 3555, 3560, 3564, 3567, 3570, 3736, 3776	Shanghai Nanxiang	
CR Shanghai	22	3501-3503, 3506–3509, 3511–3515, 3518, 3523, 3524, 3526, 3528, 3530, 3532, 3534, 3537, 3541	Hangzhou	
CR Shanghai	18	3546, 3551, 3554, 3556, 3561, 3562, 3568, 3569, 3732–3734, 3775, 3777, 3778, 3781–3783, 3785	Hefei South	
CR Shanghai	9	3545, 3553, 3565, 3735, 3737, 3779, 3780, 3784, 3786	Xuzhou East	
CR Beijing	11	5506, 5515, 5516, 5518, 5523, 5529, 5530, 5532, 5533, 5536, 5537	Caozhuang	
CR Jinan	14	5501, 5503, 5504, 5508, 5509, 5511, 5512, 5525–5528, 5534, 5539, 5540	Jinan	
CR Jinan	15	5502, 5505, 5507, 5510, 5513, 5514, 5517, 5519–5522, 5524, 5531, 5535, 5538	Qingdao North	
CR Zhengzhou	21	5541-5545, 5823–5828, 5889-5898	Zhengzhou East	
CR Xi'an	10	3543, 3544, 3548, 3549, 3552, 3557–3559, 3563, 3566	Xi'an North	
CRH380BJ (formerly CIT400B)
China Railway	2	0301, A-0504	—N/a	Comprehensive inspection trains in orange livery
CRH380CL
CR Beijing	11	5601, 5603–5605, 5607–5609, 5617, 5618, 5620, 5621	Beijing South	
CR Shanghai	14	5602, 5606, 5610–5616, 5619, 5622-5625	Xuzhou East	

== Accidents and incidents ==
On 25 January 2018 the train number G284/281 from Qingdao railway station to Hangzhou East railway station, served by CRH380BL-5522 (staffed by Jinan Railway Bureau) was forced to make an emergency stop at Dingyuan railway station due to a fire on one of the main transformers installed in Coach 2 (ZY 552202). Some 1400 passengers were evacuated, while the car affected by the fire has been completely burnt out. No injuries or casualties were reported.

== CRH3 on display in museums ==
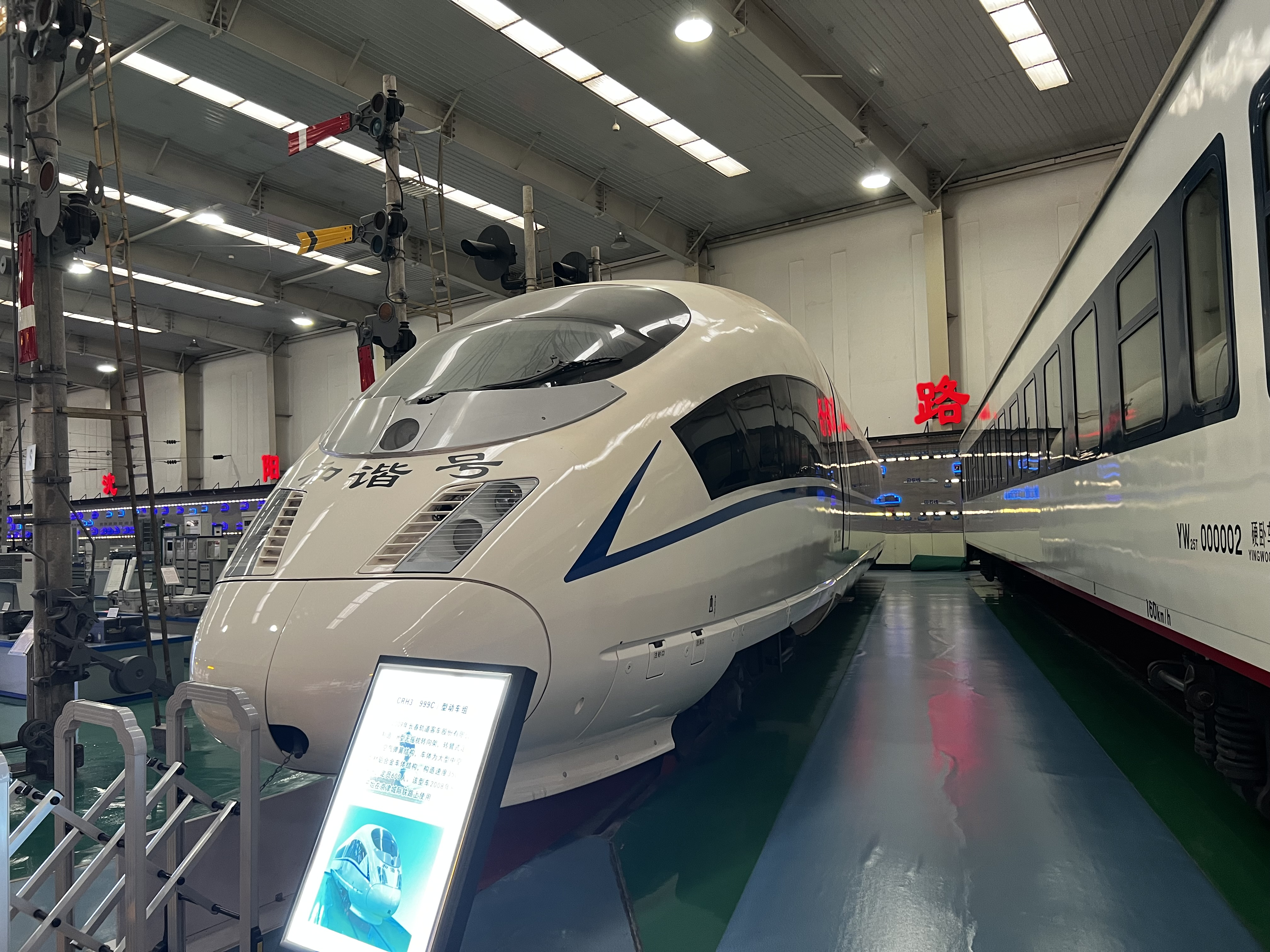
CRH3 999C at the Steam Locomotive Gallery

There is a CRH3 on display at the Steam Locomotive Gallery of Shenyang. It is CRH3 999C according to the sign in front of the train.

== See also ==
- China Railway DJF3
- China Railway CRH5
- China Railway CRH6
- China Railway CIT trains
- ICE 3
- Siemens Velaro
- List of high-speed trains
