= China Railway High-speed =

Overview
- Parent company: China Railway
- Headquarters: Beijing, China
- Locale: People's Republic of China
- Dates of operation: 2007–present

Technical
- Track gauge: 1,435 mm (4 ft 8 1/2 in) Standard gauge
- Electrification: 25 kV 50 Hz AC overhead catenary

Other
- Website: https://www.12306.cn/index/ (Chinese) https://www.12306.cn/en/index.html (English)

China Railway High-speed
- Simplified Chinese: 中国高速铁路
- Traditional Chinese: 中國高速鐵路
Transcriptions
Standard Mandarin
- Hanyu Pinyin: Zhōngguó gāosù tiělù

China Railway High-speed (CRH) is a high-speed rail service operated by China Railway in addition to China Railway's older Classic Rail services.

The introduction of CRH series was a major part of the sixth national railway speedup, implemented on April 18, 2007. By the end of 2020, China Railway High-speed provided service to all provinces in China, and operated just under 38,000 km (24,000 mi) passenger tracks in length, accounting for about two-thirds of the world's high-speed rail tracks in commercial service. China has revealed plans to extend the HSR to 70,000 km by year 2035. It is the world's most extensively used railway service, with 2.29 billion bullet train trips delivered in 2019 and 2.16 billion trips in 2020, bringing the total cumulative number of trips to 13 billion as of 2020.

Over 1000 sets of rolling stock are operated under the CRH brand including Hexie CRH1/2A/5 that are designed to have a maximum speed of 250 km/h (160 mph), and CRH2C/3 have a maximum speed of 350 km/h (220 mph). The indigenous designed CRH380A have a maximum test speed of 416.6 km/h (258.9 mph) with commercial operation speed of 350 km/h. The fastest train set, CRH380BL, attained a maximum test speed of 487.3 km/h (302.8 mph). In 2017, the China Standardized EMU brand including CR400AF/BF and CR200J joined China Railway High-speed and are designated as Fuxing together with letters CR (China Railway). With a gradual plan, the CR brand is going to replace the current CRH brand in service.

Depending on their speed, there are 3 categories of high speed trains, G, D and C (G and some C being the fastest at 350 km/h, D having a speed of 250 km/h and C having a speed of 200 km/h).

== High-speed rail network ==
High-speed rail services were first introduced in 2007 operating with CRH rolling stock. Those run on existing lines that have been upgraded to speeds of up to 250 km/h (160 mph) and on newer dedicated high-speed track rated up to 350 km/h (220 mph).

China will continue to operate the largest high-speed rail (HSR) network in the world by the end of 2021, with a length of over 40,000 km (24,855 mi). Beijing to Hong Kong High Speed Railway, the longest HSR route in the world, stretches 2,440 km (1,516 mi).

=== CRH service on dedicated high-speed lines ===
Table:CRH service on high-speed rail lines
The following table lists the frequency of CRH service on 14 HSR lines (as of August, 2012). In some cases, CRH trains must still share the HSR lines with slower, non-high-speed trains, which are listed in the table. Note China's first HSR, the Qinshen PDL service as part of the Jingha Railway.

Line (route)	Length (main line)	Travel time (By fastest train)	Trains per day (aggregation of both direction)	Designed speed	Trains in service
Jinghu HSR (Beijing–Shanghai)	1318 km	4h 48m	180	380 km/h Opening speed 350 km/h	CRH380A/AL CRH380BL CRH2A/E
Wuguang HSR (Wuhan-Guangzhou)	968 km	3h 33m	216	350 km/h	CRH2C CRH3C CRH380A/AL
Huhang HSR (Shanghai-Hangzhou)	169 km (Shanghai Hongqiao – Hangzhou)	45min	168	350 km/h	CRH1A/B/E CRH2A/B/C/E; CRH380A/AL CRH380BL
Huning ICL (Shanghai-Nanjing)	296 km (Shanghai Hongqiao – Nanjing)	1h 13min	238	350 km/h	CRH1B/E CRH2A/B/C/E; CRH380A/AL CRH380BL
Jingjin ICL (Beijing-Tianjin)	117 km	30min	200	350 km/h	CRH3C
Zhengxi HSR (Zhengzhou-Xi'an)	456 km	1h 50min	28	350 km/h	CRH2C
Yongtaiwen PFL (Ningbo-Taizhou-Wenzhou)	268 km	1h 13min	64	250 km/h	CRH1A/B/E CRH2A/B/E
Wenfu PFL (Wenzhou-Fuzhou)	298 km	1h 23min	42	250 km/h	CRH1A/B/E CRH2A/B/E
Shitai PDL (Shijiazhuang-Taiyuan)	190 km (Shijiazhuang North–Taiyuan)	1h 6min	26	250 km/h	CRH5A
Fuxia PFL (Fuzhou-Xiamen)	275 km	1h 21min	118	250 km/h	CRH1A/B/E CRH2A/B/E
Changjiu ICL (Nanchang-Jiujiang)	135 km	45min	42	250 km/h	CRH1A CRH2A
Hewu PFL (Hefei-Wuhan)	351 km	1h 58min	38	250 km/h	CRH1E CRH2A/B
Jiaoji PDL (Qingdao-Jinan)	362 km	2h 13min	42	250 km/h	CRH5A CRH380A/AL CRH380BL
Hening PFL (Hefei-Nanjing)	156 km	54min	12	250 km/h	CRH1B/E CRH2A/B/E
Chengguan PDL (Chengdu-Guanxian)	67 km	30min	36	250 km/h	CRH1A
Changji ICL (Changchun-Jilin)	111 km	34min	50	250 km/h	CRH5A
Hainan ER ICL (Haikou-Sanya)	308 km	1h 22min	44	250 km/h	CRH1A CRH380A
Guangzhu ICL (Guangzhou-Zhuhai main line)	93 km	45min	76	200 km/h	CRH1A
Guangzhu ICL (Guangzhou-Jiangmen branch line)	72 km	45min	46	200 km/h	CRH1A

=== CRH service on upgraded conventional lines ===
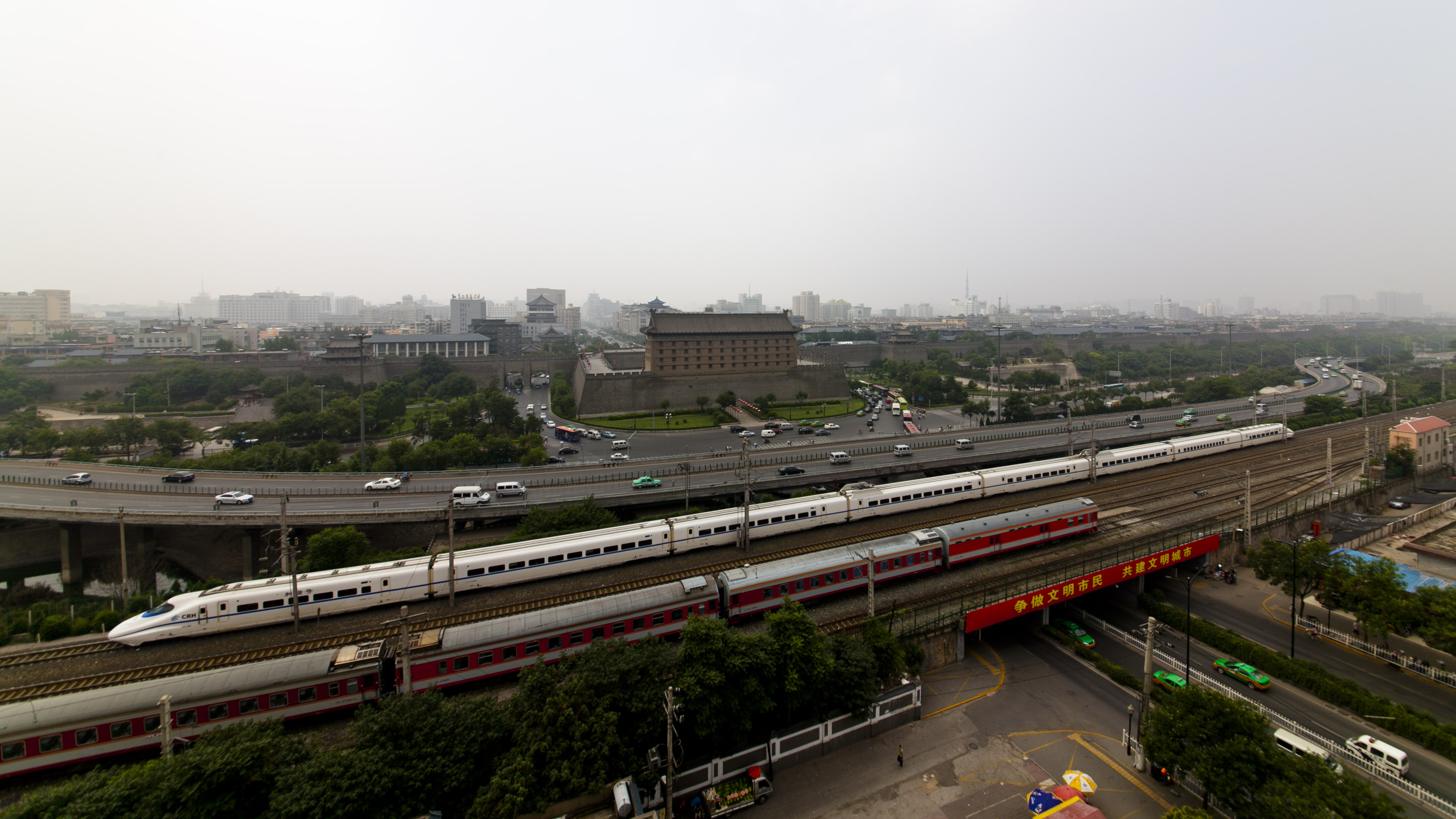
A CRH2C and possibly a regular-speed sleeper train, on the Longhai Railway outside of city walls of Xi'an.

As of September 2010, there were 2,876 kilometres (1,787 mi) of upgraded conventional railways in China that can accommodate trains running speeds of 200 to 250 km/h. Over time with the completion of the national high-speed passenger-dedicated rail network, more CRH service will shift from these lines to the high-speed dedicated lines.

A. Intercity service (typically, listed in schedules as C-series or D-series trains):

- Beijing – Beidaihe, Qinhuangdao
- Beijing – Tianjin, Tanggu
- Beijing – Shijiazhuang, Taiyuan
- Shanghai – Kunshan, Suzhou, Wuxi, Changzhou, Nanjing, Hefei, Xuzhou, Nantong
- Shanghai – Hangzhou, Yiwu, Jinhua, Quzhou
- Nanjing – Hangzhou
- Guangzhou – Shenzhen
- Shenzhen – Jiangmen – Zhanjiang
- Wuhan – Zhengzhou, Changsha
- Changsha – Nanchang
- Xi'an – Baoji

B. Long-haul service (typically, listed in schedules as G-series or D-series trains):

- Beijing – Shenyang, Changchun, Harbin
- Beijing – Jinan, Qingdao, Shanghai
- Beijing – Zhengzhou, Wuhan
- Shanghai – Zhengzhou, Qingdao, Shenyang
- Shanghai – Nanchang
- Wuhan – Changsha – Guangzhou

Table:CRH service on conventional rail lines
The table below lists the upgraded conventional railways that run CRH high-speed trains every day.

Route	Railway	distance	Trains per day (aggregation of both direction)	Trains in service
Guangzhou–Shenzhen	Guangshen line	147 km	220	CRH1A
Wuhan–Shiyan	Handan line	500 km	4	CRH2A CRH5A
Beijing–Shijiazhuang	Jingguang line	277 km	5	CRH5A
Shijiazhuang–Qinhuangdao	Jingguang line & Jingha line	586 km	1	CRH5A
Beijing–Qinhuangdao	Jingha line	299 km	3	CRH5A
Beijing–Shenyang	Jingha line	703 km	24	CRH5A
Beijing–Nanjing	Jinghu line	1150 km	1	CRH2E
Chongqing–Chengdu	Chengyu line & Dacheng line	315 km	22	CRH1A
Beijing–Shanghai	Jinghu line	1454 km	3	CRH1E CRH2E
Hangzhou–Ningbo	Xiaoyong line	149 km	50	CRH1A/B/E CRH2A/B/E
Hangzhou–Nanchang	Hukun line	644 km	1	CRH2A
Nanchang–Changsha	Hukun line	419 km	2	CRH1A CRH2A
Wuhan–Nanchang	Wujiu line & Changjiu PDL	337 km	16	CRH1A CRH2A
Xi'an–Baoji	Longhai line	173 km	2	CRH2A
Beijing–Zhengzhou	Jingguang line	605 km	3	CRH5A
Beijing–Wuhan	Jingguang line	1205 km	3	CRH5A

=== Overnight high-speed trains ===
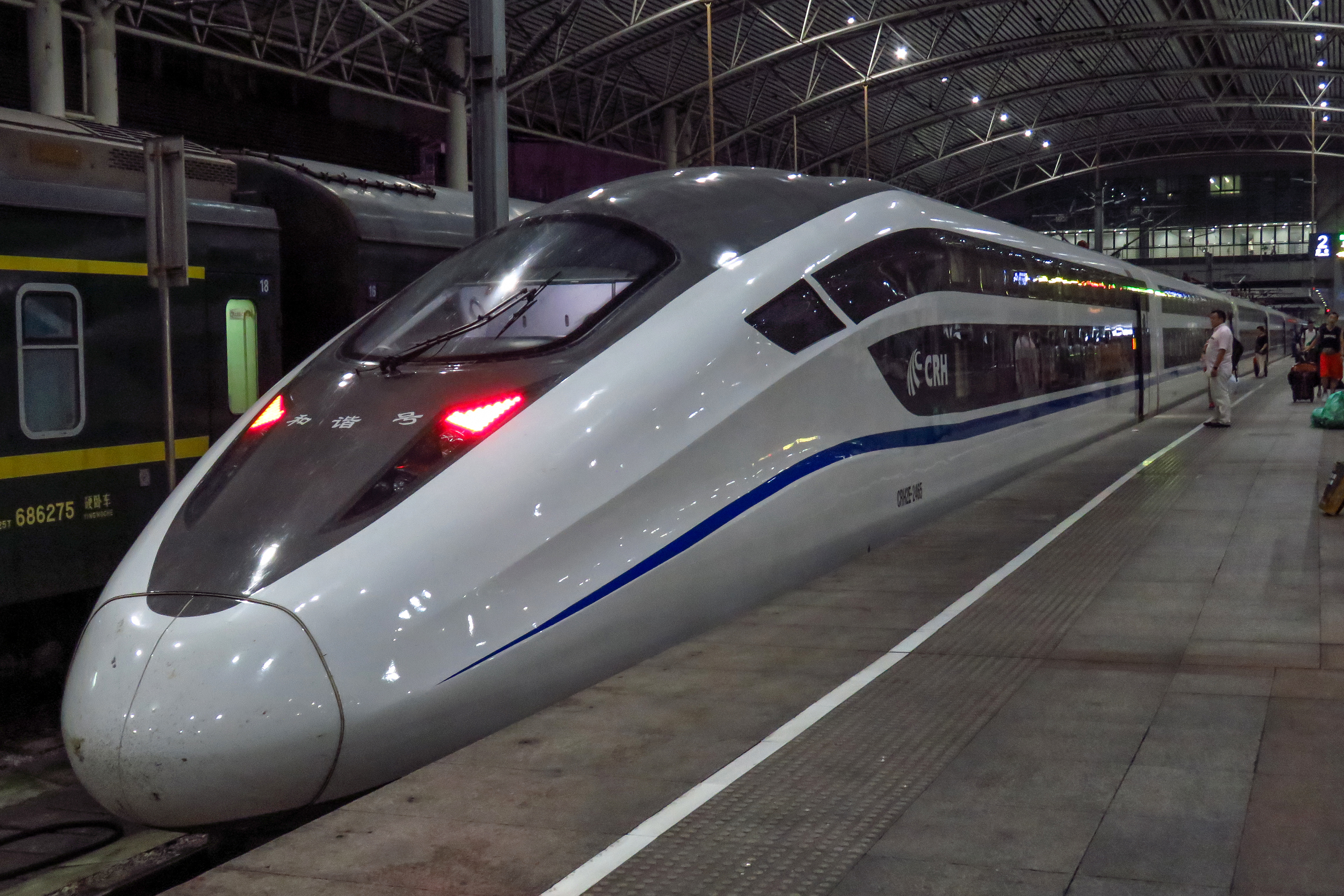
A CRH2E Duplex high-speed overnight sleeper at Shanghai railway station in 2017.

Unlike the "conventional" (non-CRH trains), which run round the clock, most high-speed rail lines operations shut down each night. There are several sleeper EMU services (abbreviated 动卧, dòngwò) running on the upgraded rail or high-speed lines operated with CRH1E and CRH2E trains.

Conventional higher-speed Z-series overnight rail services may also use certain sections of the high-speed rail network; e.g., the planned Shanghai-Chengdu train Z121/2/3/4 will use the Huhanrong PDL from Nanjing to Wuhan.

With the schedule change planned for December 21, 2012, some of these trainsets will be re-purposed to also provide overnight high-speed service between Shanghai and Xi'an North. In the 2014, Chunyun season, overnight HSR trains first ran on Beijing-Guangzhou (Jingguang) and other lines.

In November 2016, CRRC Changchun unveiled CRH5E bullet train carriages with sleeper berths. Made in the CRRC factory in Changchun and nicknamed Panda, they are capable of running at 250 km/h, operate at -40 degrees Celsius, have Wi-Fi hubs and contain sleeper berths that fold into seats during the day. In 2017, CRRC unveiled a high speed train with double decked sleeper "capsules" classed as the CRH2E series high speed rail train. On January 5, 2019, the CR200J entered service replacing many locomotive-hauled trains.

== Rolling stock ==
China Railway High-speed train passing through Shenzhou railway station in Hainan

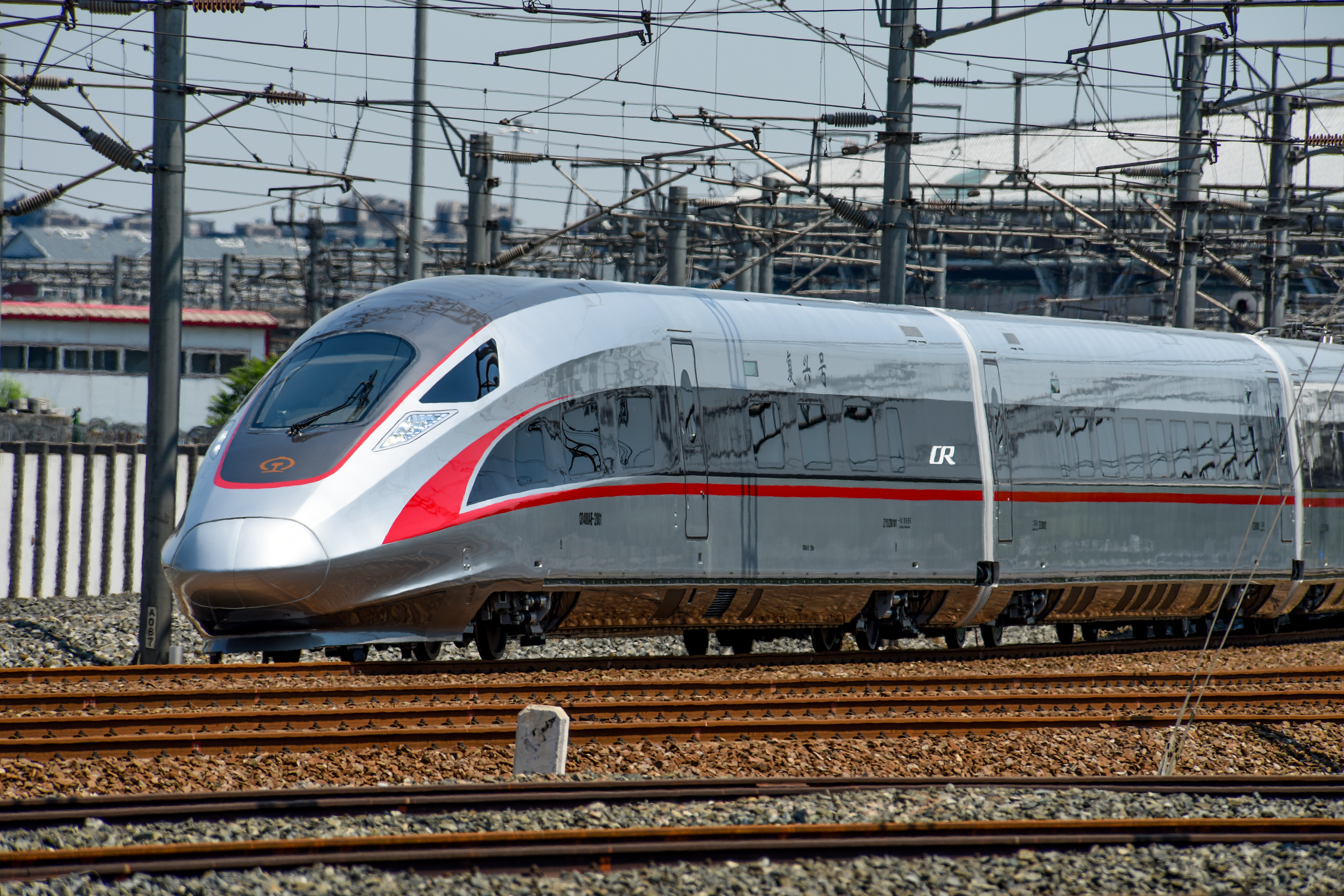
Chinese-designed CR400AF departing from Beijing South railway station.

China Railway High-speed runs different electric multiple unit trainsets, the name Hexie Hao (simplified Chinese: 和谐号; traditional Chinese: 和諧號; pinyin: Héxié Hào; lit. 'Harmony') is for designs which are imported from other nations and designated CRH-1 through CRH-5 and CRH380A(L), CRH380B(L), and CRH380C(L). CRH trainsets are intended to provide fast and convenient travel between cities. Some of the Hexie Hao train sets are manufactured locally through technology transfer, a key requirement for China. The signalling, track and support structures, control software, and station design are developed domestically with foreign elements as well. By 2010, the track system as a whole is predominantly Chinese. China currently holds many new patents related to the internal components of these trains, re-designed to allow the trains to run at higher speeds than the foreign designs allowed. However, these patents are only valid within China, and as such hold no international power. The weakness on intellectual property of Hexie Hao causes obstructions for China to export its high-speed rail related products, which lead to the development of the completely redesigned train brand called Fuxing Hao (simplified Chinese: 复兴号; traditional Chinese: 復興號; pinyin: Fùxīng Hào; lit. 'Rejuvenation'), based on indigenous technologies.

The trainsets are as follows:

Hexie (Harmony)

- CRH1 produced by Bombardier Transportation's joint venture Sifang Power (Qingdao) Transportation (BST), CRH1A, and CRH1B, nicknamed "Metro" or "Bread", derived from Bombardier's Regina; CRH1E, nicknamed "Lizard", is Bombardier's ZEFIRO 250 design
  - CRH1A: sets consists of 8 cars; maximum operating speed of 250 km/h
  - CRH1B: a modified 16-car version; maximum operating speed of 250 km/h
  - CRH1E: a 16-car high-speed sleeper version; maximum operating speed of 250 km/h
- CRH2: nicknamed "Hairtail", derived from E2 Series 1000 Shinkansen
  - CRH2A: In 2006, China unveiled CRH2, a modified version of the Japanese Shinkansen E2-1000 series. An order for 60 8-car sets had been placed in 2004, with the first few built in Japan, the rest produced by Sifang Locomotive and Rolling Stock in China.
  - CRH2B: a modified 16-car version of CRH2; maximum operating speed of 250 km/h
  - CRH2C (Stage one): a modified version of CRH2 with a maximum operating speed up to 300 km/h as a result of replacing two intermediate trailer cars with motored cars
  - CRH2C (Stage two): a modified version of CRH2C (stage one) has a maximum operating speed up to 350 km/h by using more powerful motors
  - CRH2E: a modified 16-car version of CRH2 with sleeping cars
- CRH3: nickname "Rabbit", derived from Siemens ICE3 (class 403); 8-car sets; maximum operating speed of 350 km/h
- CRH5A: derived from Alstom Pendolino ETR600; 8-car sets; maximum operating speed of 250 km/h
- CRH6: designed by CSR Puzhen and CSR Sifang, will be manufactured by CSR Jiangmen. It is designed to have two versions: one with a top operating speed of 220 km/h; the other with a top operating speed of 160 km/h. They will be used on 200 km/h or 250 km/h Inter-city High Speed Rail lines; planned to enter service by 2011
- CRH380A; Maximum operating speed of 380 km/h. Developed by CSR based on CRH2 and manufactured by Sifang Locomotive and Rolling Stock; entered service in 2010
  - CRH380A: 8-car version
  - CRH380AL: 16-car version
- CRH380B: upgraded version of CRH3; maximum operating speed of 380 km/h, manufactured by Tangshan Railway Vehicle and CRRC Changchun Railway Vehicles; entered service in 2011
  - CRH380B: 8-car version
  - CRH380BL: 16-car version
- CRH380CL: designed and manufactured by CRRC Changchun Railway Vehicles. Maximum operating speed of 380 km/h; entered service in 2012
- CRH380D: also named Zefiro 380; maximum operating speed of 380 km/h, manufactured by Bombardier Sifang (Qingdao) Transportation Ltd.; entered service in 2012
  - CRH380D: 8-car version
  - CRH380DL: 16-car version (Cancelled in place of additional CRH1A and Zefiro 250NG sets)

CRH1A, B, E, CRH2A, B, E, and CRH5A are designed for a maximum operating speed (MOR) of 200 km/h and can reach up to 250 km/h. CRH3C and CRH2C designs have an MOR of 300 km/h, and can reach up to 350 km/h, with a top testing speed of more than 380 km/h. However, issues such as maintenance costs, comfort, and safety make the maximum speed of more than 380 km/h impractical and remain limiting factors.

Fuxing (Rejuvenation)

- CR450AF: Maximum operating speed of 400 km/h; Developed by CRRC Qingdao Sifang, guided by Chinese EMU standard.
- CR450BF: Maximum operating speed of 400 km/h; Developed by CRRC Changchun Railway Vehicles, guided by Chinese EMU standard.
- CR400AF: Maximum operating speed of 350 km/h; Developed by CRRC Qingdao Sifang, guided by Chinese EMU standard.
  - CR400AF: 8-car version
  - CR400AF-A: 16-car version
  - CR400AF-B: 17-car version
- CR400BF: Maximum operating speed of 350 km/h; Developed by CRRC Changchun Railway Vehicles, guided by Chinese EMU standard.
  - CR400BF: 8-car version
  - CR400BF-A: 16-car version
  - CR400BF-B: 17-car version
- CR300AF: Maximum operating speed of 250 km/h; Developed by CRRC Qingdao Sifang, guided by Chinese EMU standard.
- CR300BF: Maximum operating speed of 250 km/h; Developed by CRRC Changchun Railway Vehicles, guided by Chinese EMU standard.
- CR200J: Maximum operating speed of 160 km/h; Developed by CRRC Nanjing Puzhen, CRRC Qingdao Sifang, CRRC Tangshan, CRRC Zhuzhou Locomotive, CRRC Datong and CRRC Dalian.

Equipment type	Top speed in test	Designed speed	Seating capacity	Formation	Power (under 25 kV)	Entry into Service
CRH1A	278 km/h (173 mph)	250	668 or 649 or 645	5M3T	5,300 kW	2007
CRH1B	292 km/h (181 mph)	250	1299	10M6T	11,000 kW	2009
CRH1E		250	618 or 642	10M6T	11,000 kW	2009
CRH2A	282 km/h (175 mph)	250	610 or 588	4M4T	4,800 kW	2007
CRH2B	275 km/h (171 mph)	250	1230	8M8T	9,600 kW	2008
CRH2C Stage 1	394.2 km/h (244.9 mph)	300	610	6M2T	7,200 kW	2008
CRH2C Stage 2		350	610	6M2T	8,760 kW	2010
CRH2E		250	630	8M8T	9,600 kW	2008
CRH3C	394.3 km/h (245.0 mph)	350	600 or 556	4M4T	8,800 kW	2008
CRH5A		250	622 or 586 or 570	5M3T	5,500 kW	2007
CRH380A	416.6 km/h (258.9 mph)	380	494	6M2T	9,600 kW	2010
CRH380AL	486.1 km/h (302.0 mph)	380	1027	14M2T	20,440 kW	2010
CRH380B		380	556	4M4T	9,200 kW	2011
CRH380BL	487.3 km/h (302.8 mph)	380	1004	8M8T	18,400 kW	2010
CRH380CL		380		8M8T	19,200 kW	2012
CRH380D		380	495	4M4T	10,000 kW	2012
CRH380DL		380	1013	8M8T	20,000 kW	Canceled (2012 original plan)
CRH6		220	586	4M4T	unknown	2011
CR400AF		400	556	4M4T		2017
CR400BF		400	556	4M4T		2017
CR400AF-A		400	1193	8M8T		2018
CR400BF-A		400	1193	8M8T		2018
CR400AF-B		400	1283	8M9T		2019
CR400BF-B		400	1283	8M9T		2019
CR200J	215 km/h	200	720; 1102	Mc+7T+Tc; Mc+16T+Mc; Mc+9~16T+Mc		2019
CR300AF		300	613	4M4T		2020
CR300BF		300	613	4M4T		2020

=== Chinese MOR CRH trainsets order timetable ===
==== Chinese MOR CRH trainsets order timetable ====
Date	Factory	Speed Level	Type	Quantity (set)	Quantity (car)	Amount
2004-10-10	Alstom	250 km/h	CRH5A	3	24	620 million EUR
2004-10-10	CNR Changchun	250 km/h	CRH5A	57	456	620 million EUR
2004-10-12	BST (Bombardier & CSR)	250 km/h	CRH1A	20	160	US$350 million
2004-10-20	Kawasaki	250 km/h	CRH2A	3	24	9,300 million RMB
2004-10-20	CSR Sifang	250 km/h	CRH2A	57	456	9,300 million RMB
2005-05-30	BST	250 km/h	CRH1A	20	160	US$350 million
2005-06	CSR Sifang	300 km/h	CRH2C Stage one	30	240	8,200 million RMB
2005-06	CSR Sifang	350 km/h	CRH2C Stage two	30	240	8,200 million RMB
2005-11-20	Siemens	350 km/h	CRH3C	3	24	13,000 million RMB
2005-11-20	CNR Tangshan	350 km/h	CRH3C	57	456	13,000 million RMB
2007-10-31	BST	250 km/h	CRH1B	20	320	1,000 million EUR
2007-10-31	BST	250 km/h	CRH1E	20	320	1,000 million EUR
2007-11	CSR Sifang	250 km/h	CRH2B	10	160	1,200 million RMB
2007-11	CSR Sifang	250 km/h	CRH2E	6	96	900 million RMB
2008-12-06	CSR Sifang	250 km/h	CRH2E	14	224	2,100 million RMB
2009-09-23	CNR Changchun	250 km/h	CRH5A	30	240	4,800 million RMB
2009-03-16	CNR Tangshan	380 km/h	CRH380BL	70	1,120	39,200 million RMB
2009-03-16	CNR Changchun	380 km/h	CRH380BL	30	480	39,200 million RMB
2009-09-28	CSR Sifang	380 km/h	CRH380A	40	320	45,000 million RMB
2009-09-28	CSR Sifang	380 km/h	CRH380AL	100	1,600	45,000 million RMB
2009-09-28; Modified 2012-09-05	BST	380 km/h	CRH380D	70	560	27,400 million RMB
2009-09-28; Modified 2012-09-05	BST	250 km/h	CRH1A	46	368	27,400 million RMB
2009-09-28; Modified 2012-09-05	BST	250 km/h	Zefiro 250NG	60	480	27,400 million RMB
2009-09-28	CNR Changchun	380 km/h	CRH380B	40	320	23,520 million RMB
2009-09-28	CNR Changchun	380 km/h	CRH380BL	15	240	23,520 million RMB
2009-09-28	CNR Changchun	380 km/h	CRH380CL	25	400	23,520 million RMB
2009-09-28	CNR Tangshan	350 km/h	CRH3C	20	160	3,920 million RMB
2009-12-30	CSR Puzhen	220 km/h	CRH6	24	192	2,346 million RMB
2010-07-16	BST	250 km/h	CRH1A	40	320	5,200 million RMB
2010-09-14	CSR Sifang	250 km/h	CRH2A	40	320	3,400 million RMB
2010-10-13	CNR Changchun	250 km/h	CRH5A	20	160	2,700 million RMB
2011-04-26	CNR Changchun	250 km/h	CRH5A	30	240	3,870 million RMB
Total				1050	10,240	

=== Chinese CRH trainsets delivery timetable ===
Based on data published by Sinolink Securities; some small changes were made according to the most recent news.

Type	2006	2007	2008	2009	2010	2011	Future (plan)	Total
CRH1A	8	18	12	2	20	20	106	80
CRH2A	19	41			15	25		100
CRH5A		27	29	4	30	20	30	140
CRH1B			4	9	7			20
CRH1E				3	8	9		20
CRH2B			10					10
CRH2E			6	14				20
CRH2C			10	20	30			60
CRH3C			7	36	37			80
CRH380A					40			40
CRH380AL					6	94		100
CRH380B						20	20^{1}	40
CRH380BL					11	49	55^{1}	115
CRH380CL							25^{1}	25
CRH380D							70^{2}	70
CRH380DL							0^{2}	0
CRH6							24	24
Total	27	86	78	88	204	237	330	1050
Cumulative	27	113	191	279	483	744	1050	1050

- ^1 All CRH380B and CRH380C units to be delivered before 2012.
- ^2 All CRH380D units to be delivered before 2014.

=== Hexie trains ===
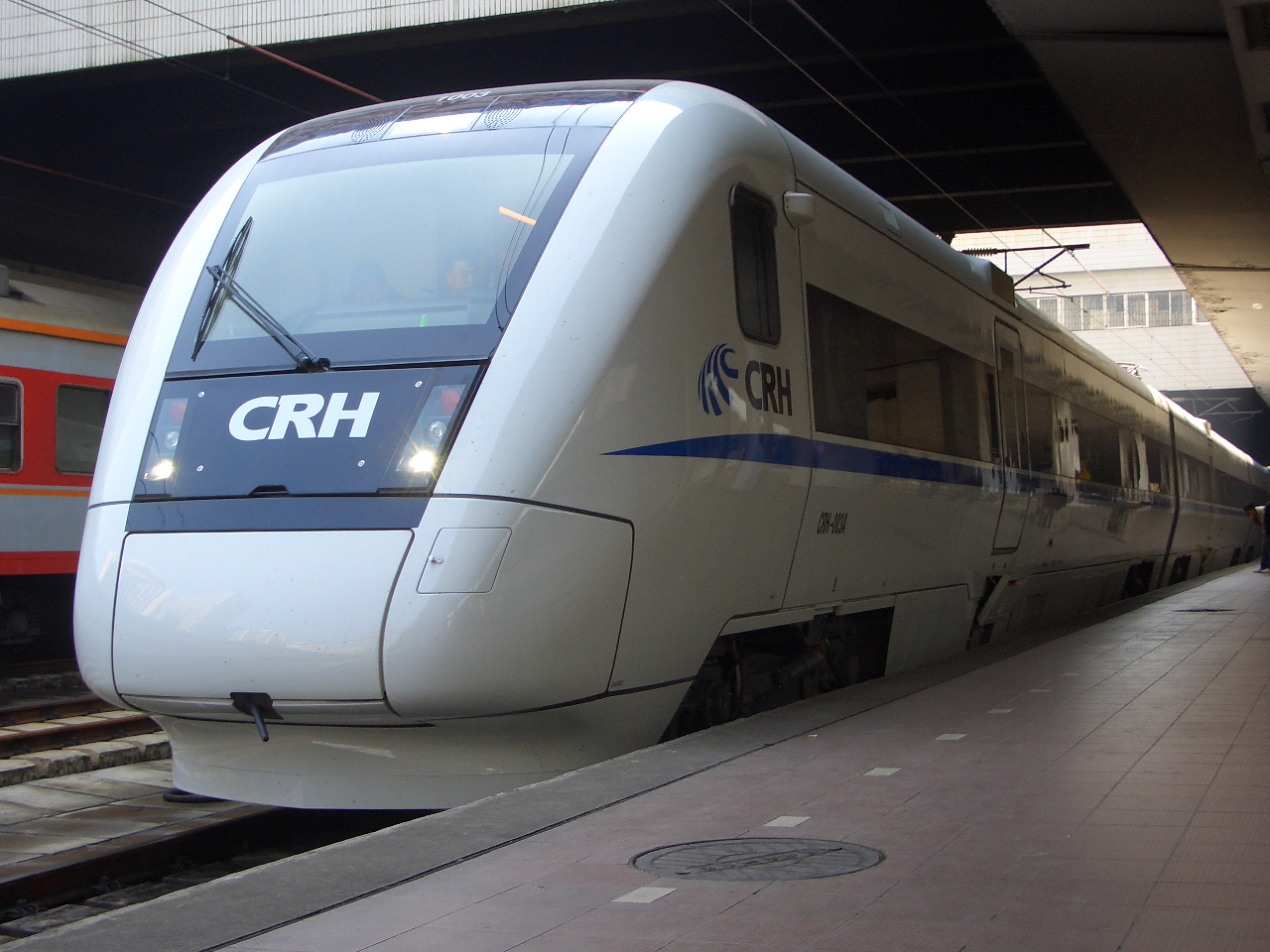
CRH1

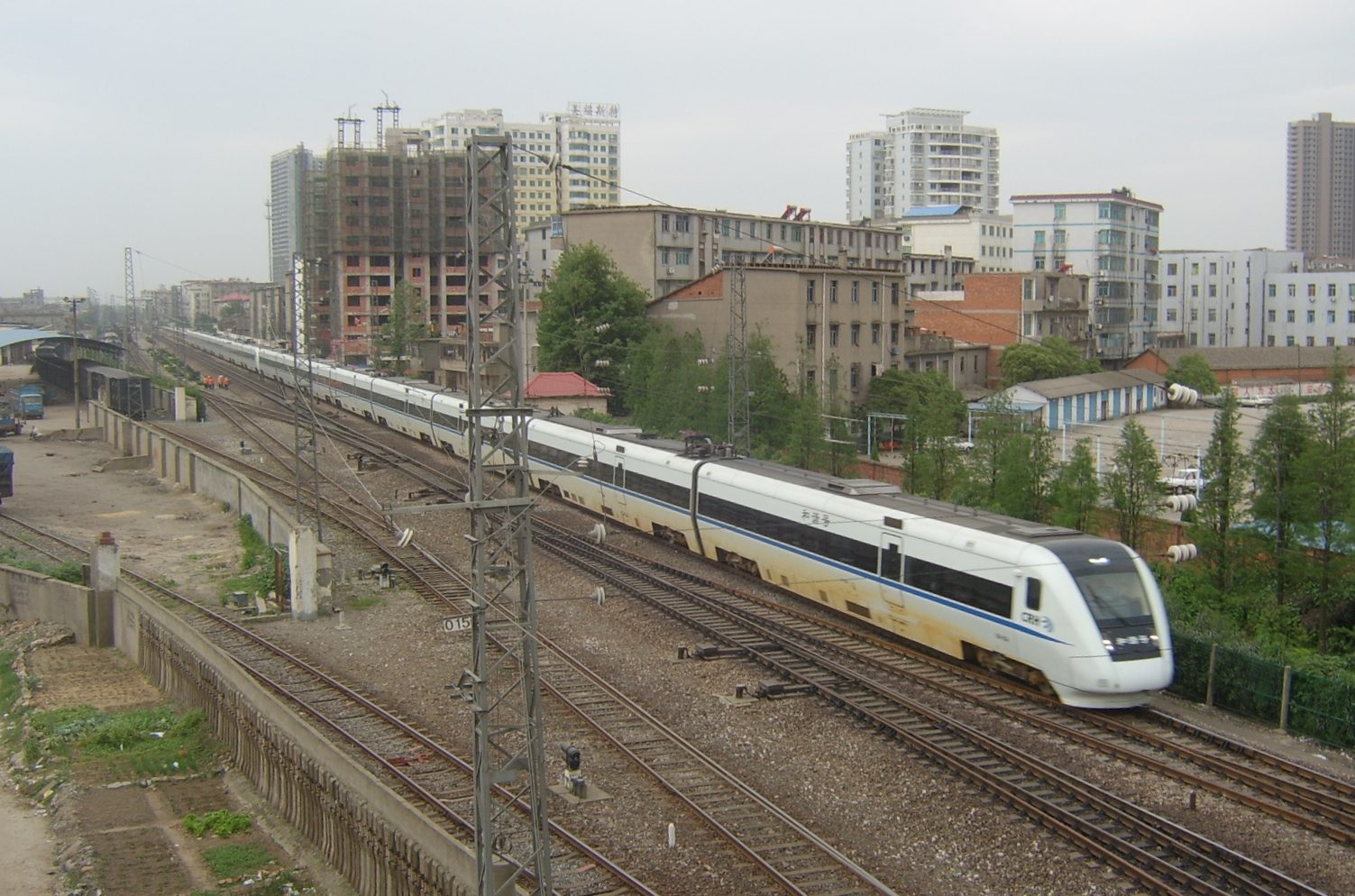
Two coupled 8-car CRH1A electric multiple unit train sets in Nanchang

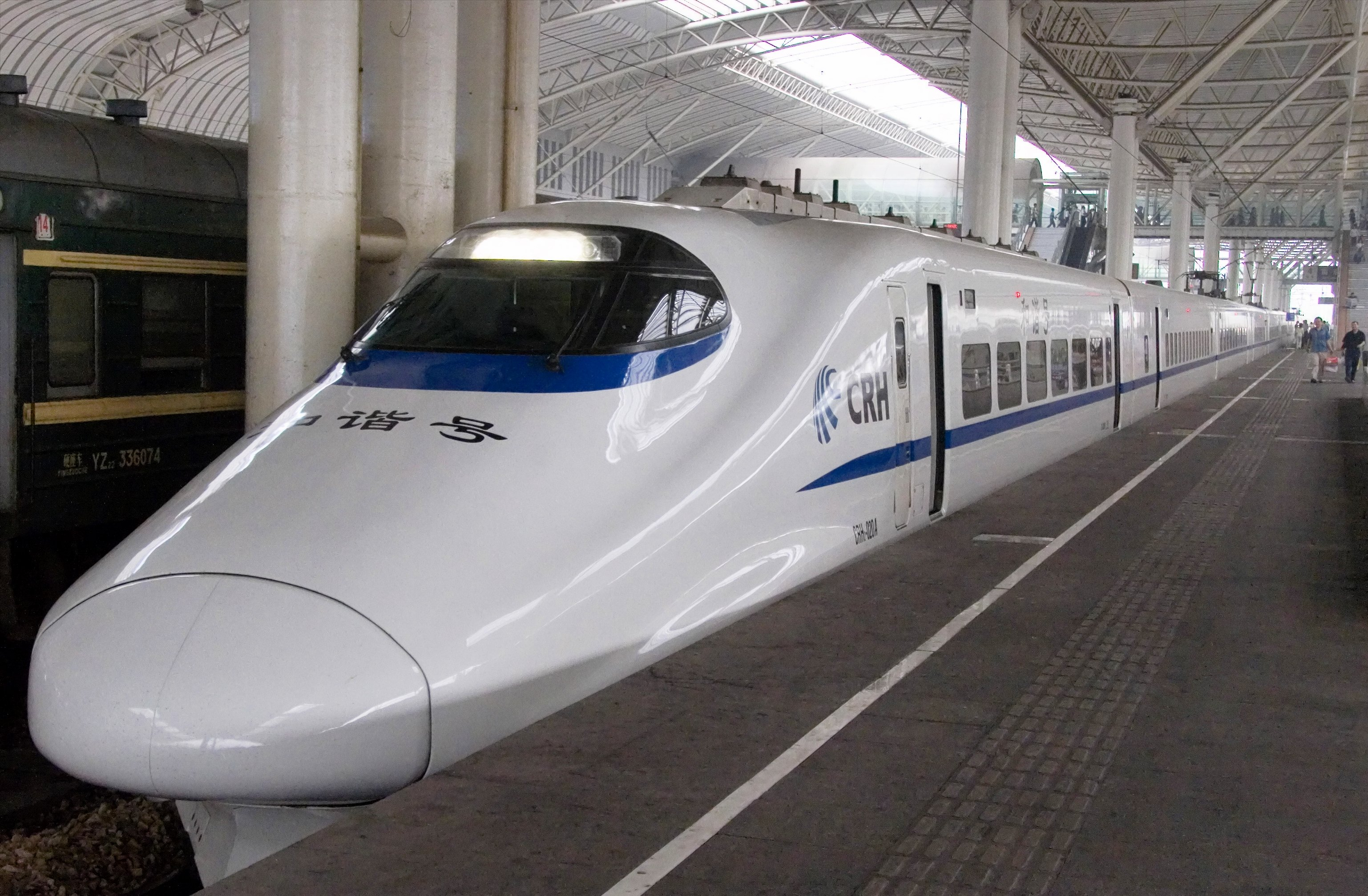
CRH2

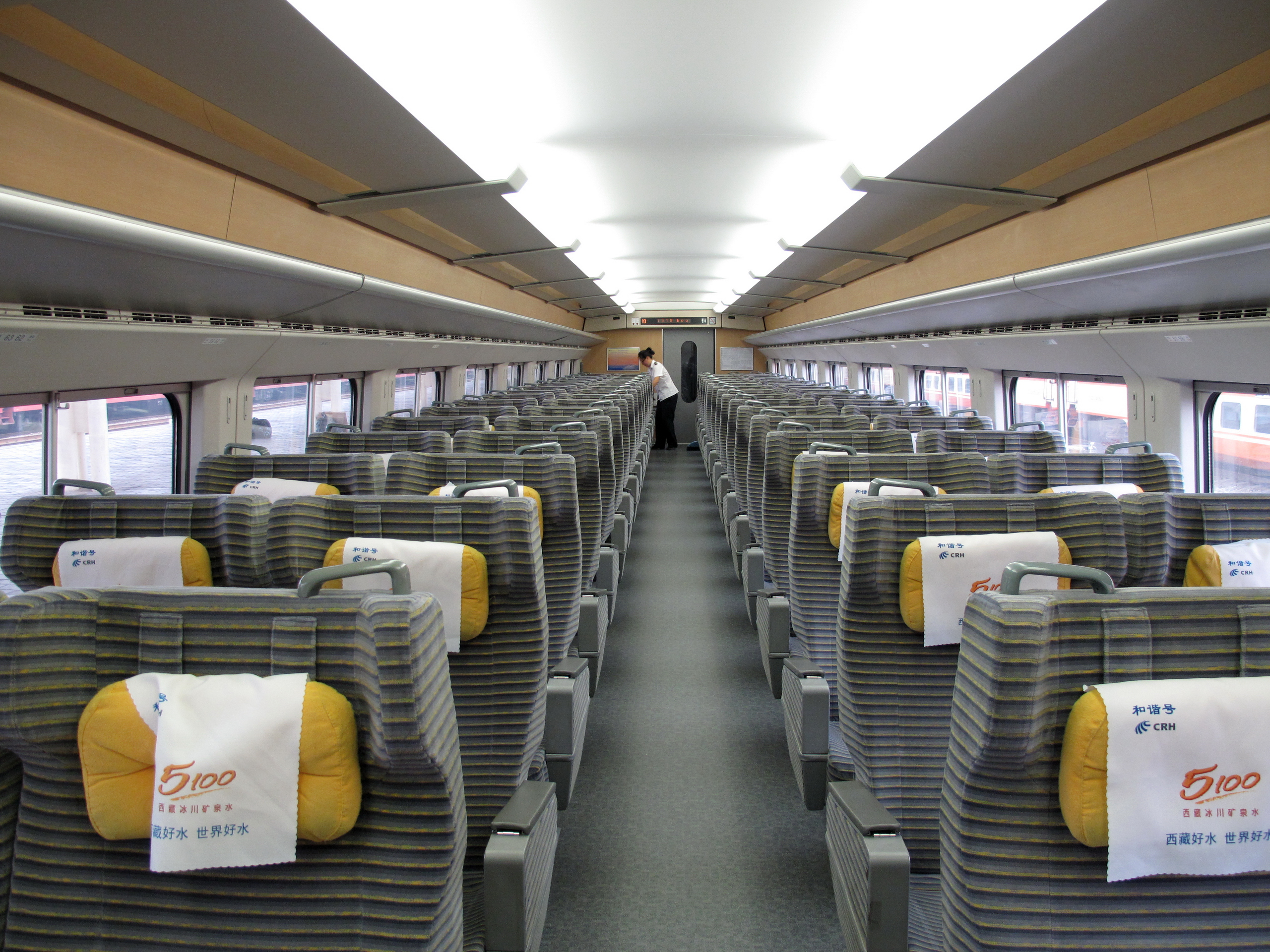
CRH2 First Class Coach

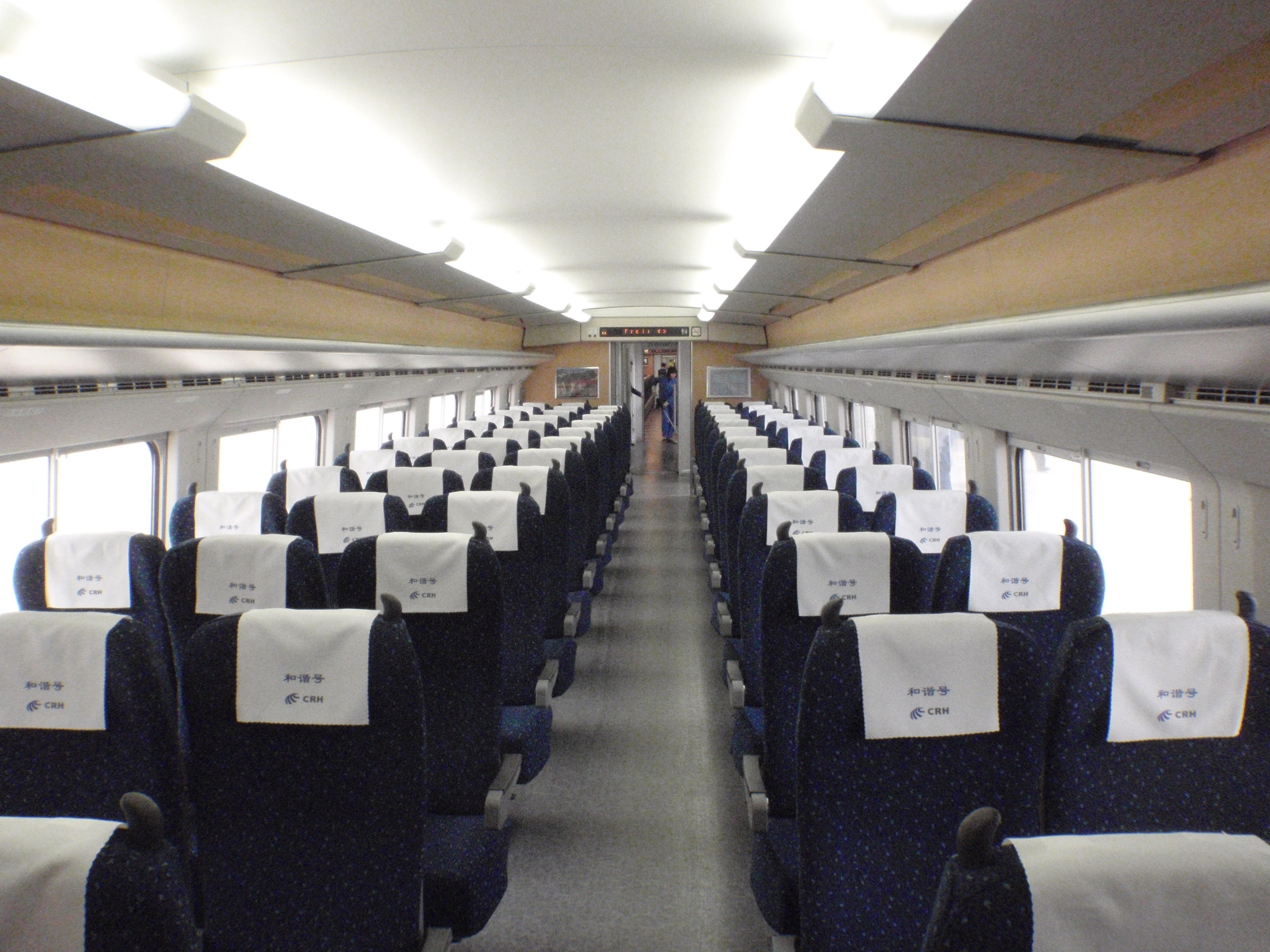
CRH2 Second Class Coach

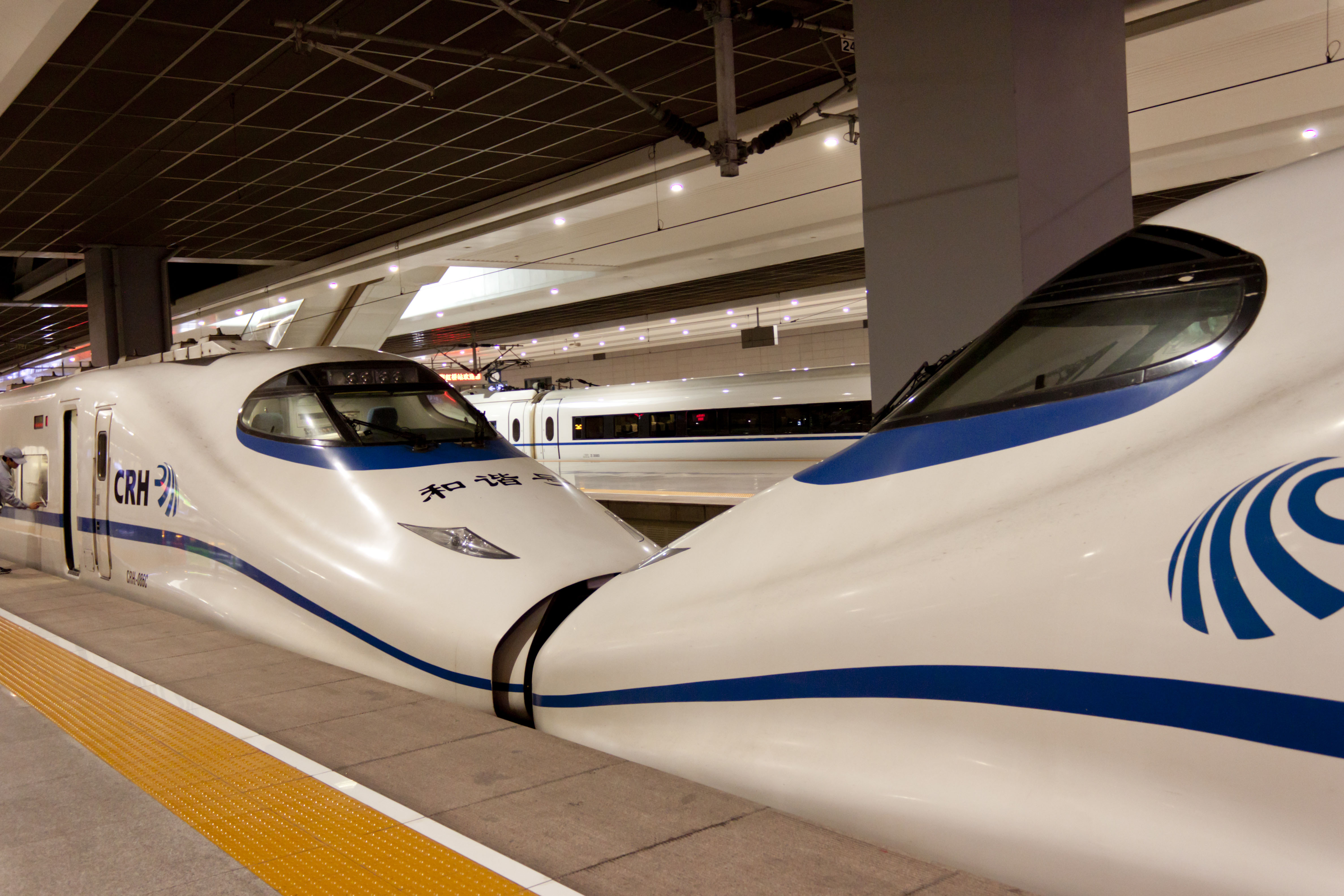
CRH2C at Shanghai Hongqiao railway station

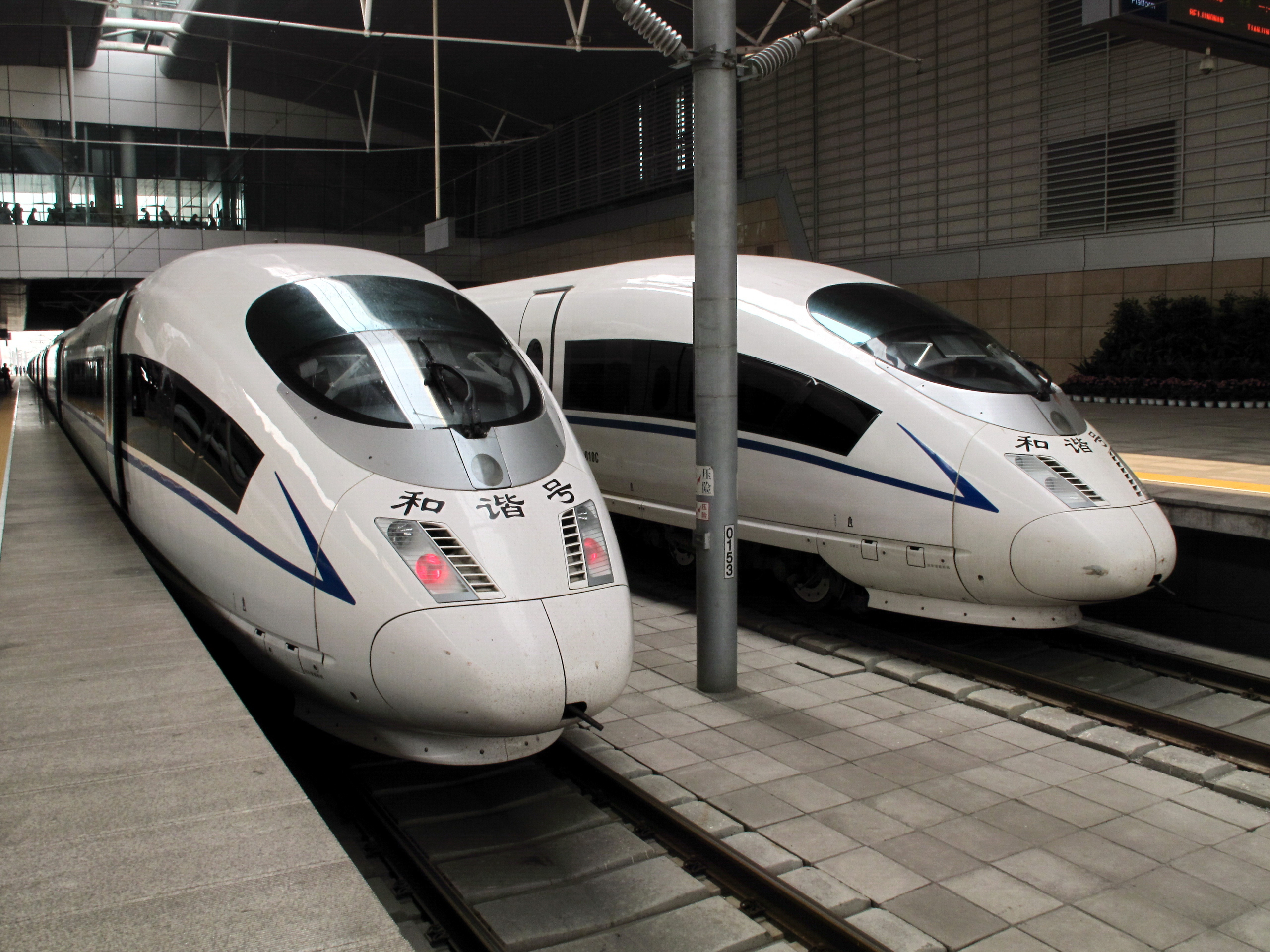
CRH3

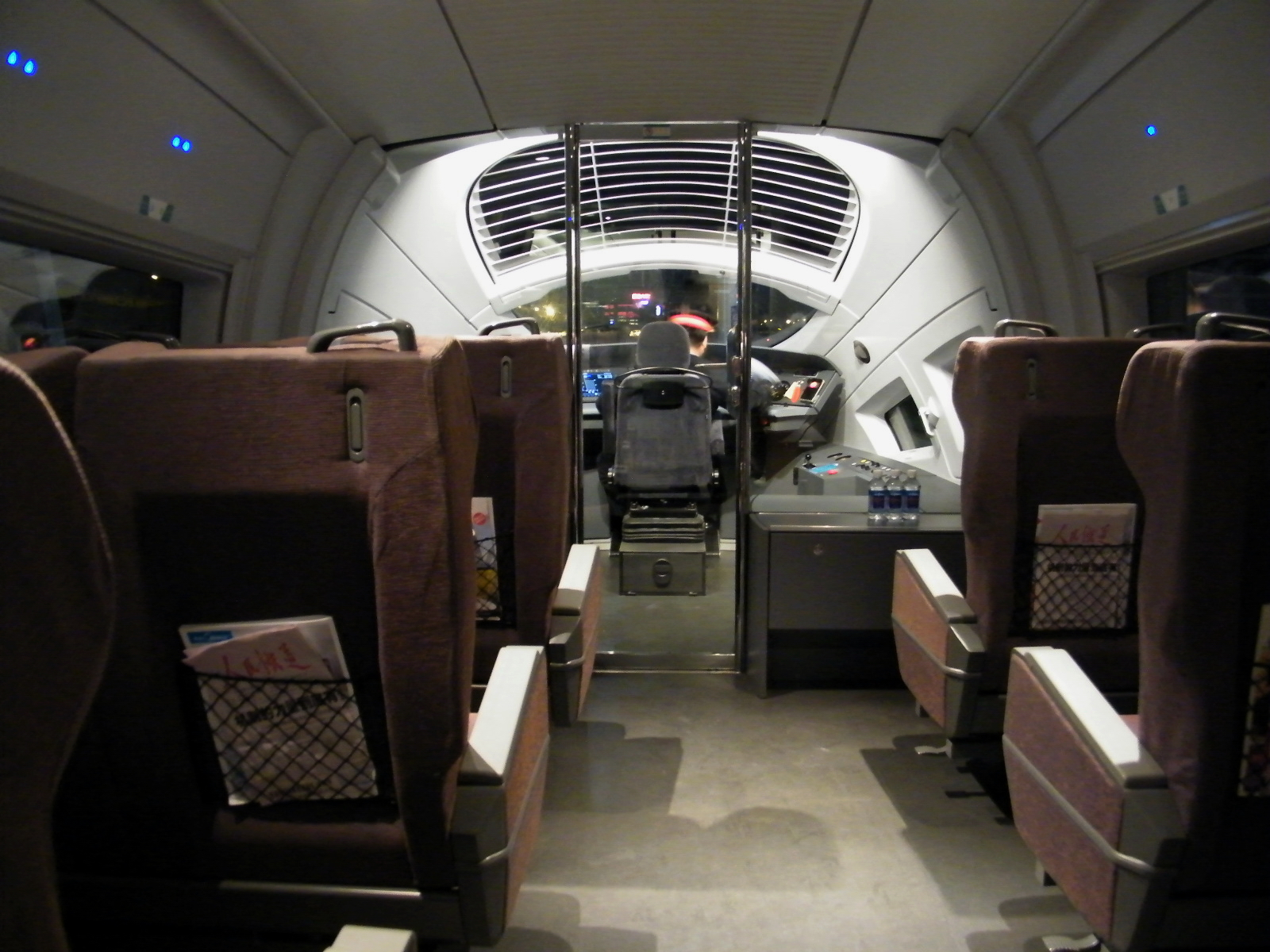
Premier-class cabin inside Beijing-Tianjin Intercity CRH3 train

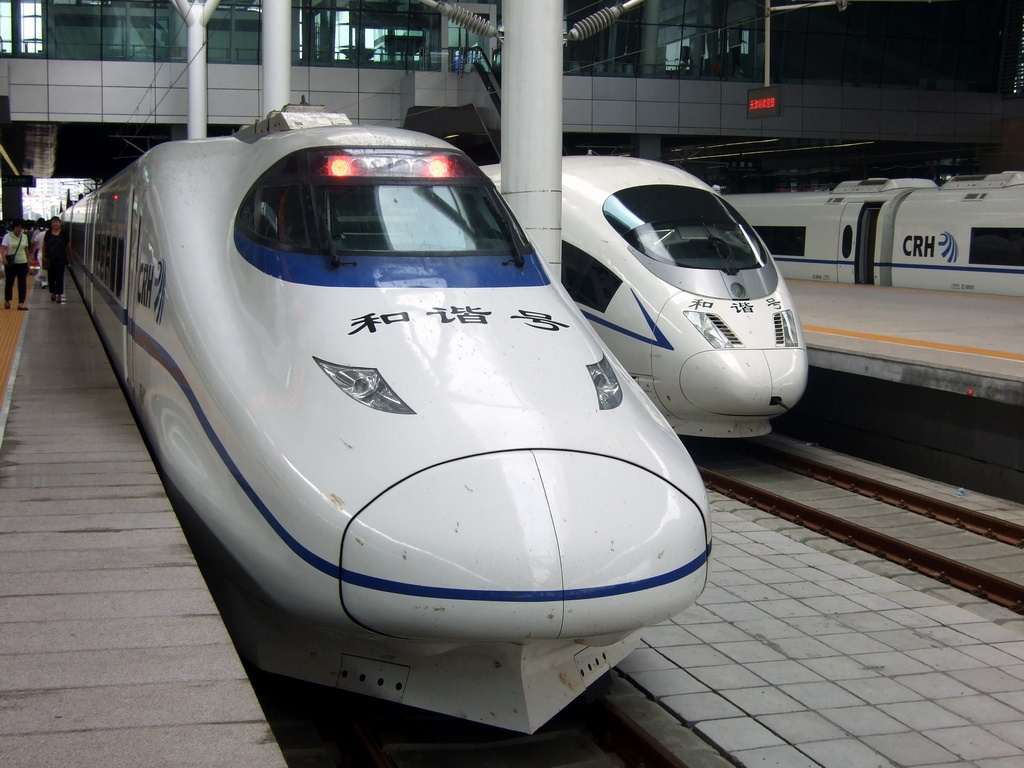
CRH2C and CRH3C at Tianjin railway station

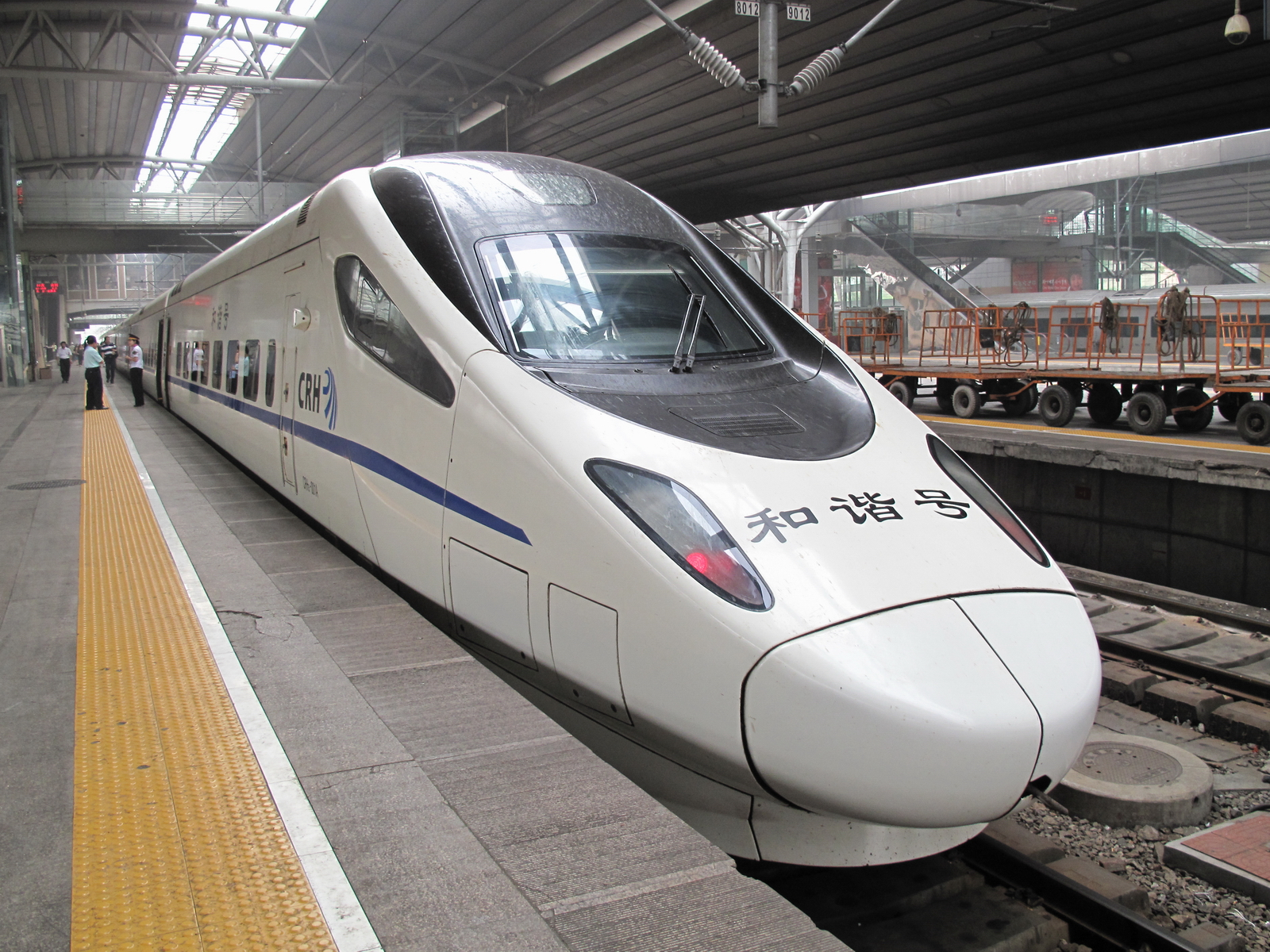
CRH5

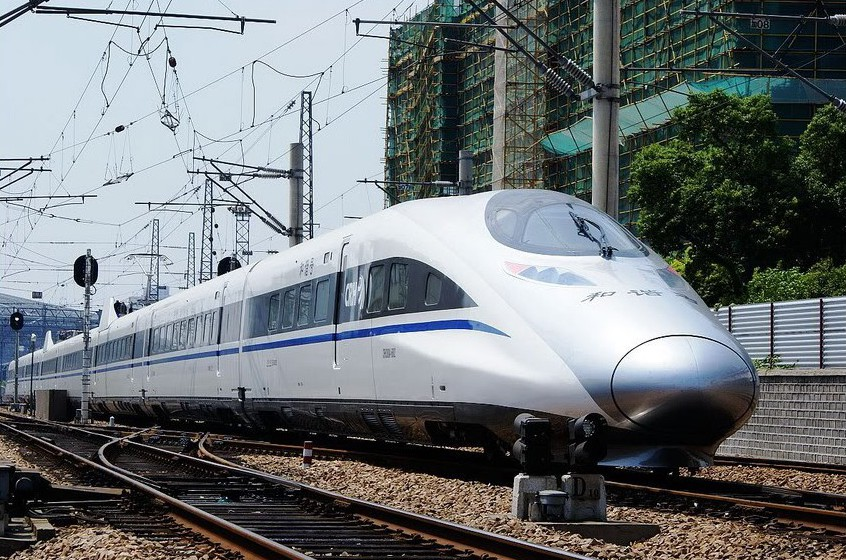
CRH380A

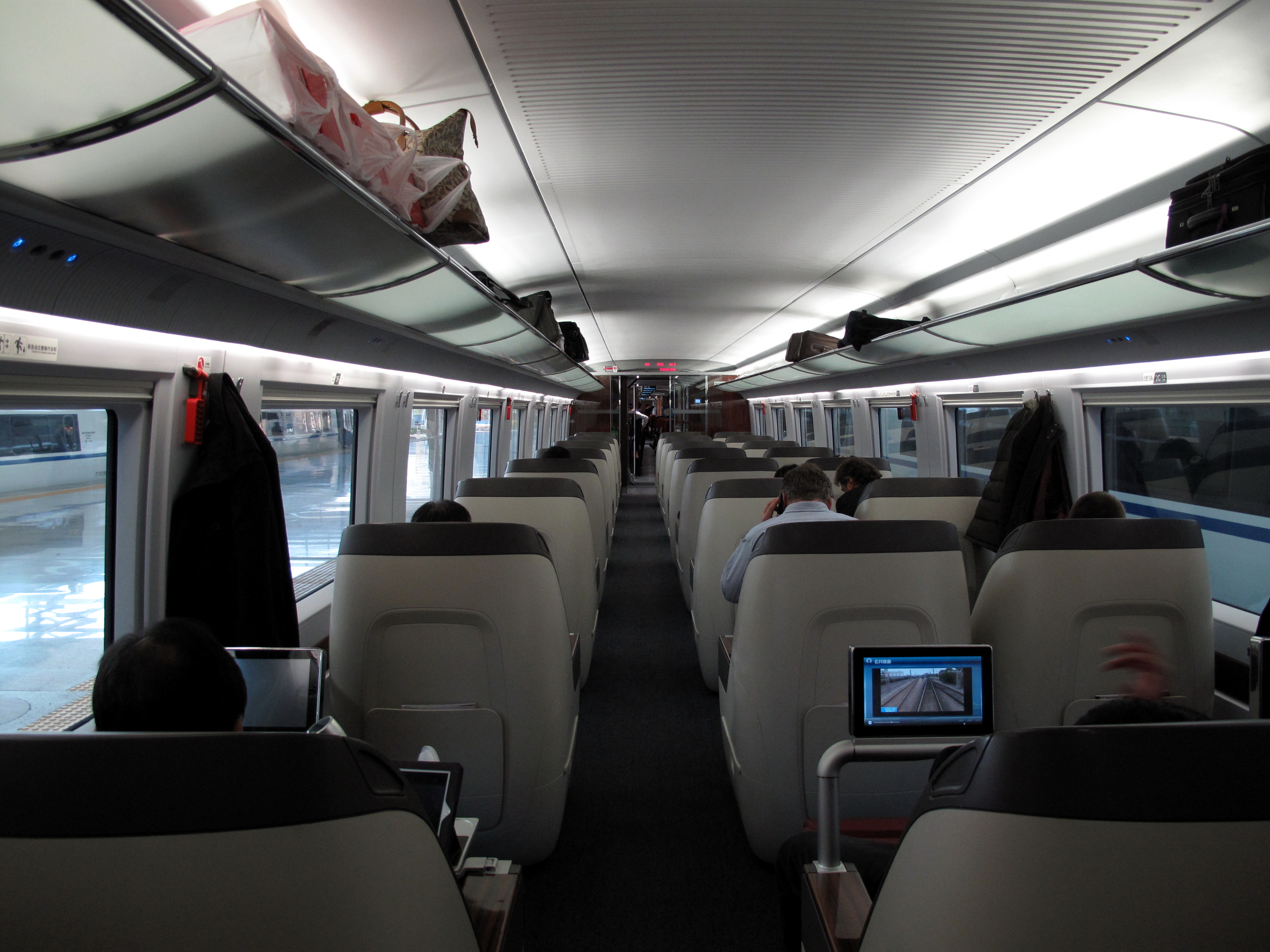
CRH380BL Business Coach

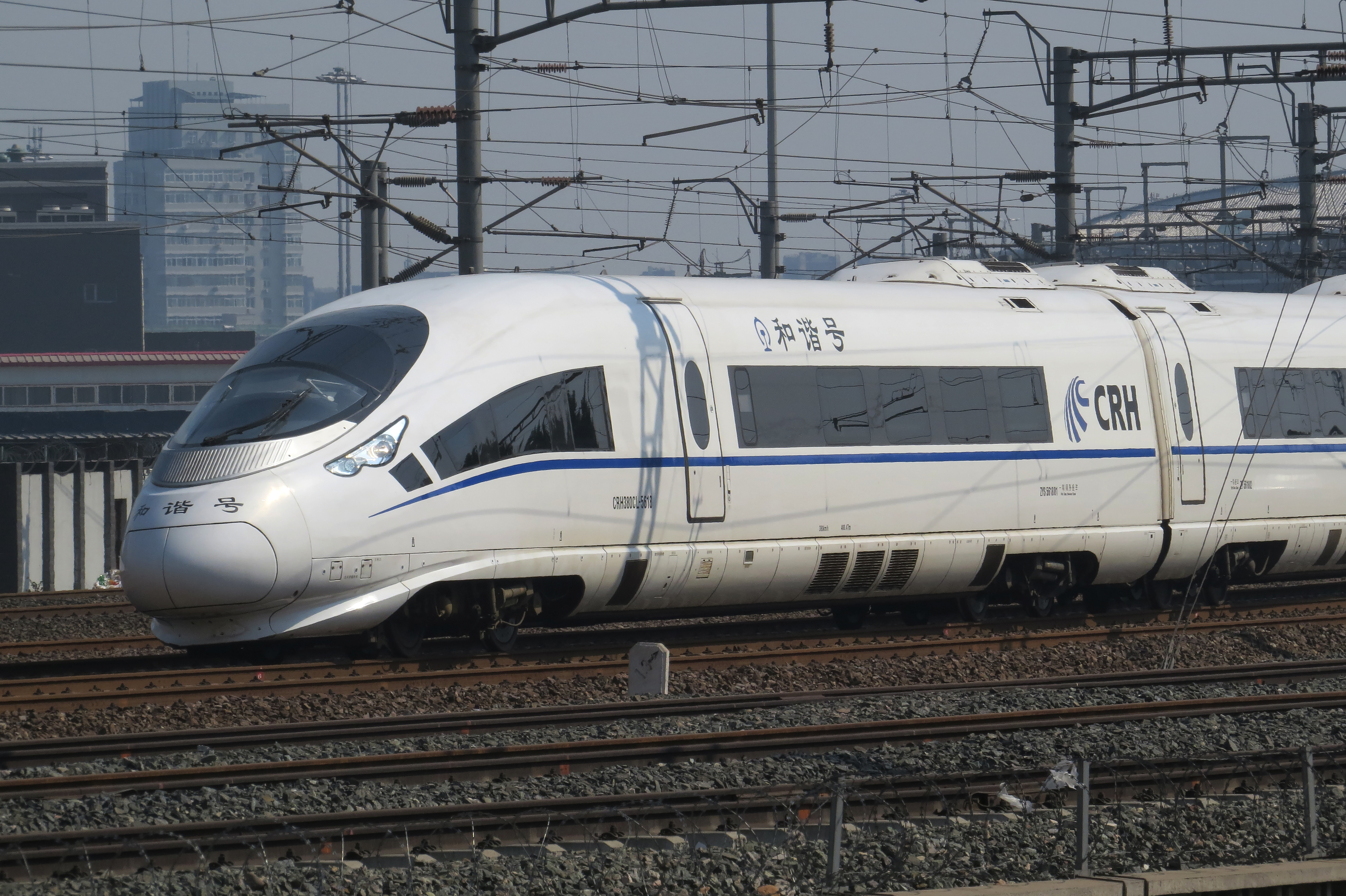
CRH380CL at Beijing South railway station

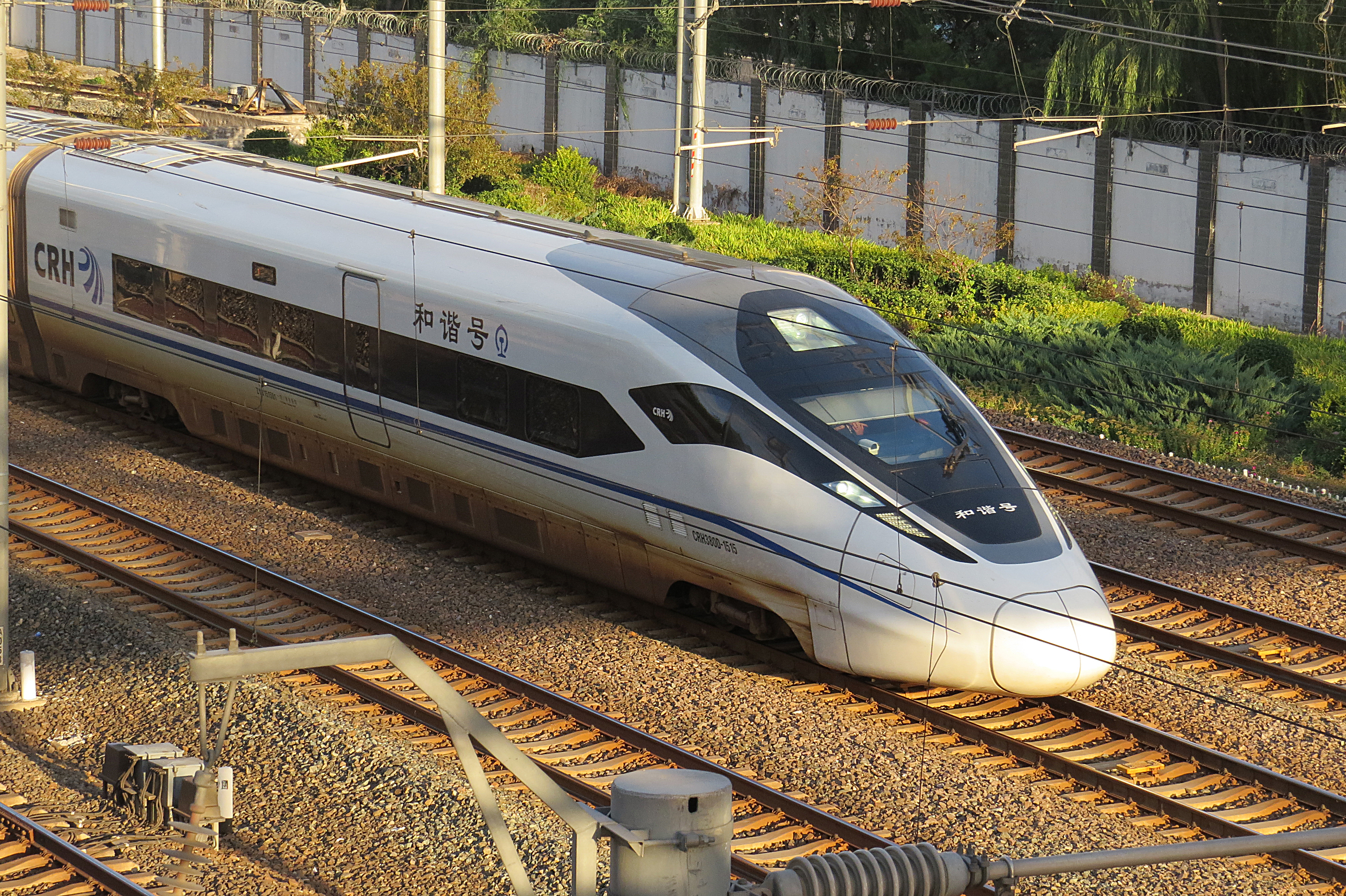
CRH380D at Beijing South railway station

=== Fuxing trains ===
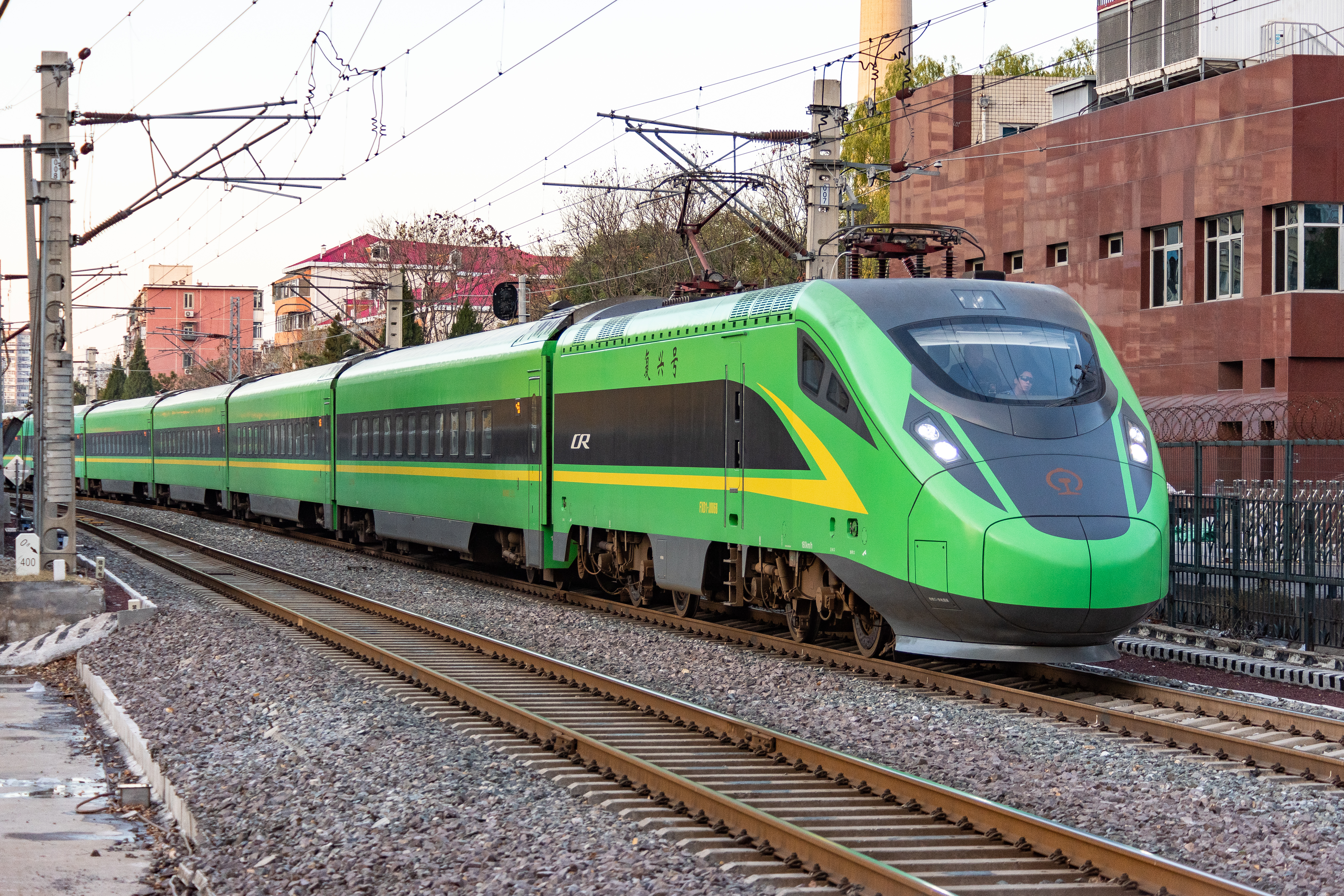
The CR200J, the slowest of the Fuxing Trains

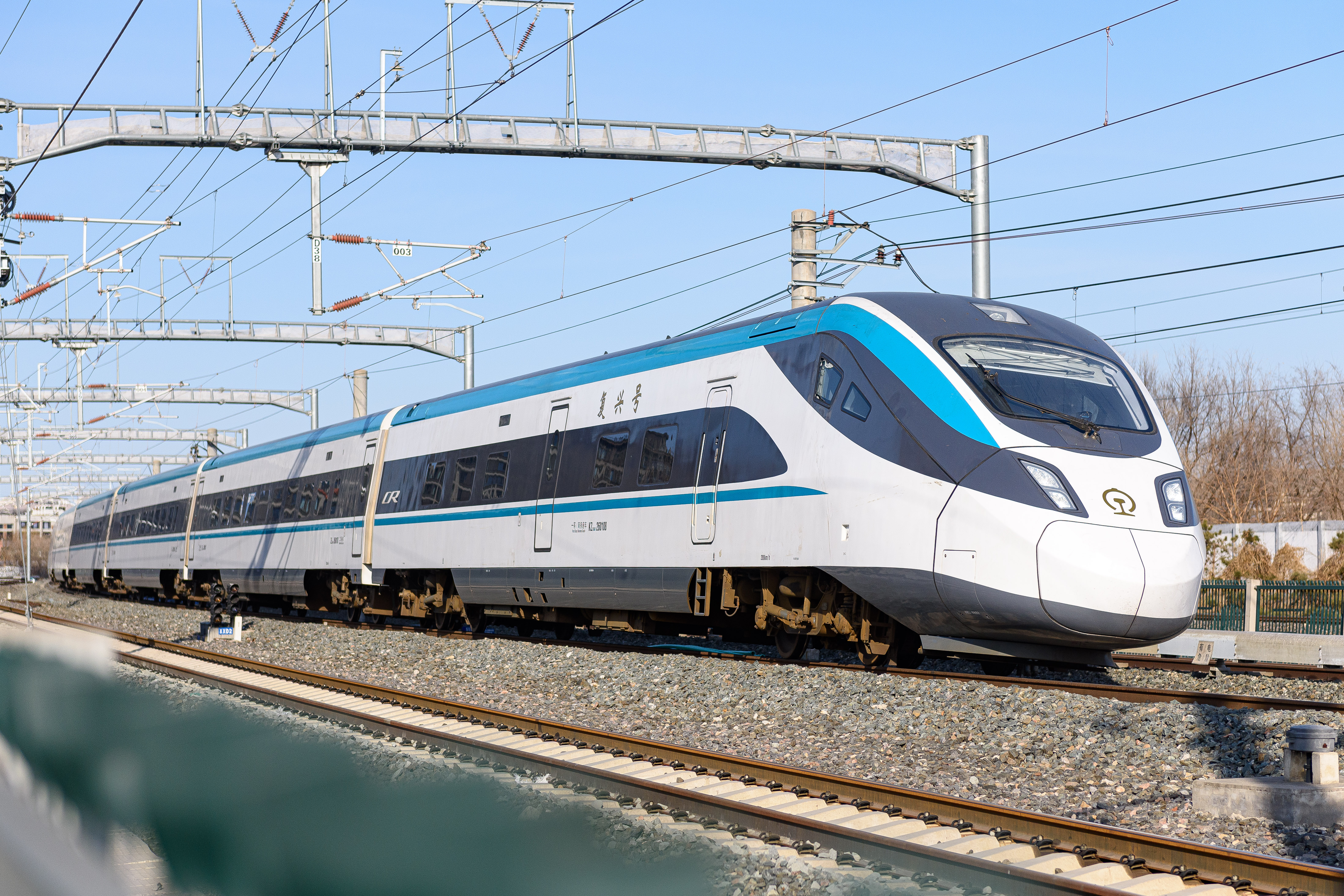
The CR220J, the slowest of the Fuxing Trains

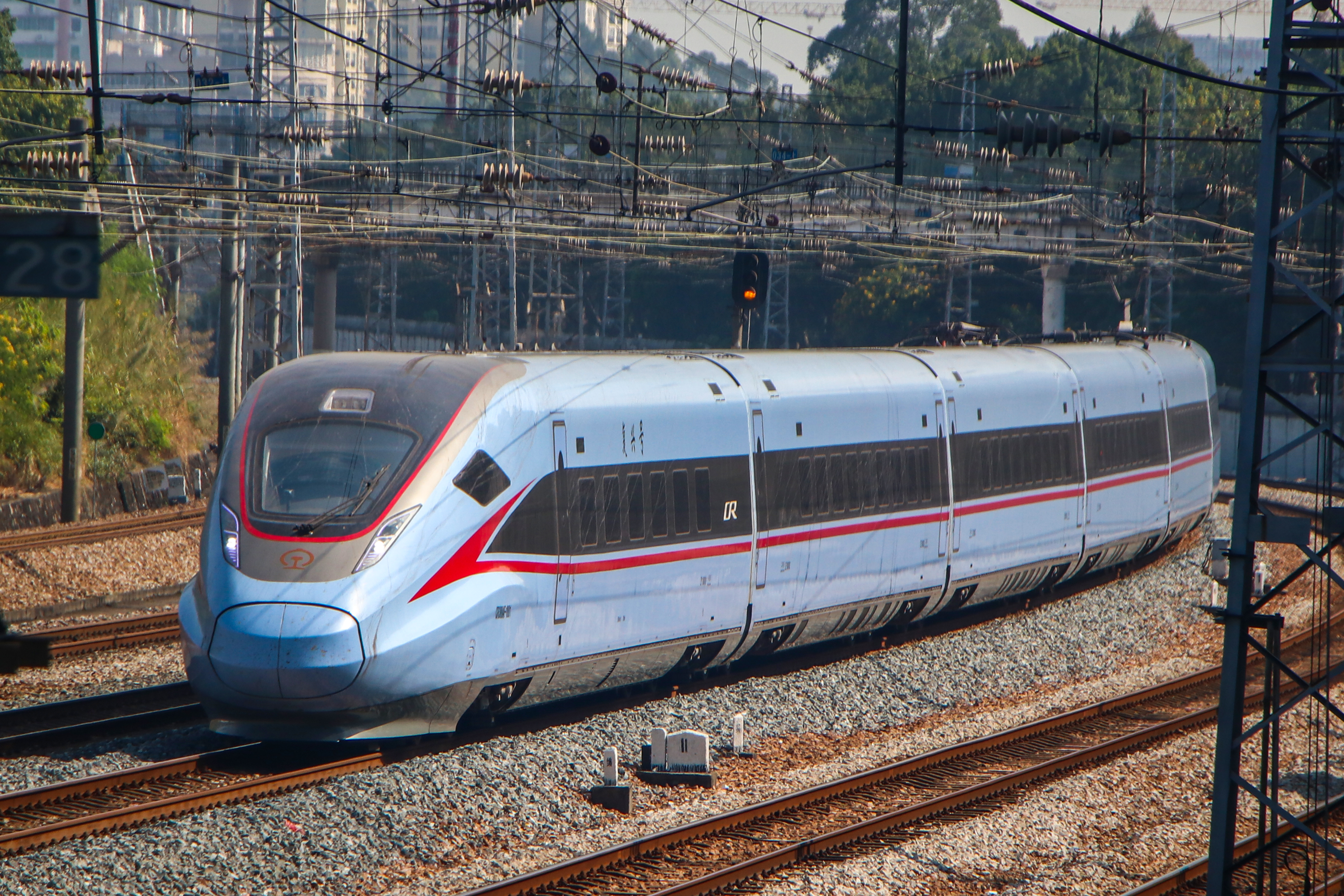
The CR300AF, Max Speed 300 km/h with an operating speed of 250 km/h

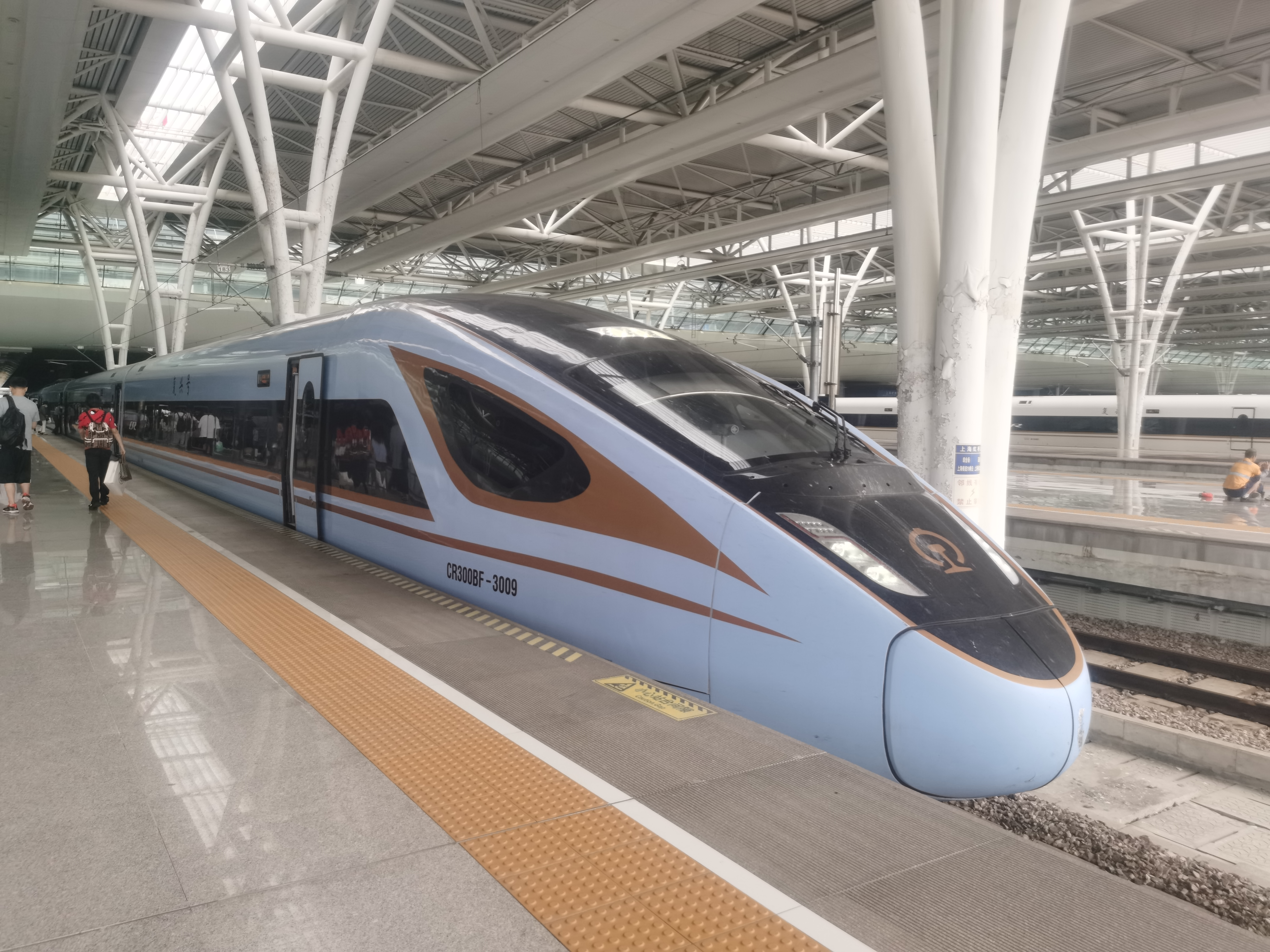
The CR300BF, same speed as the CR300AF, just from a different Manufacturer

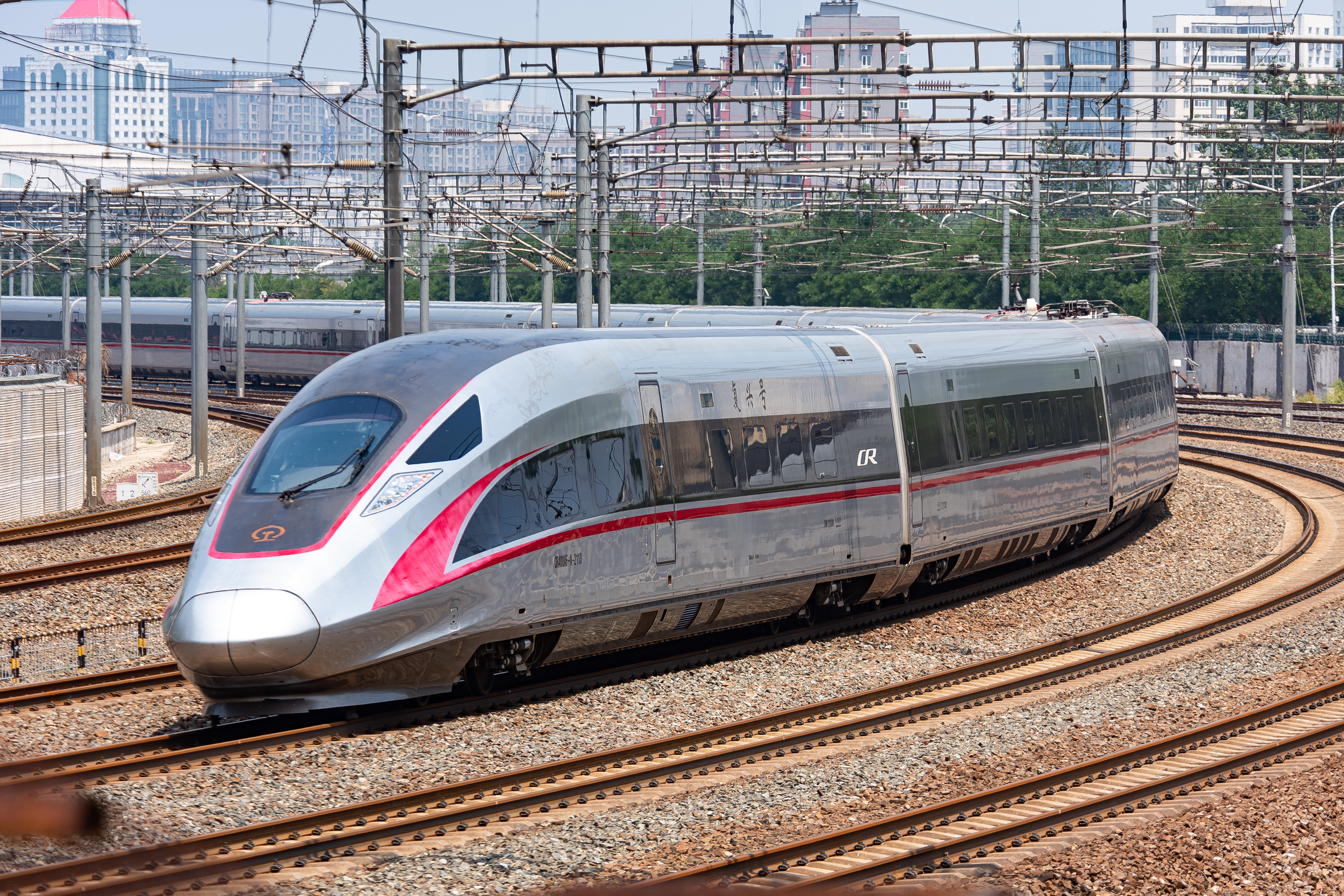
The CR400AF

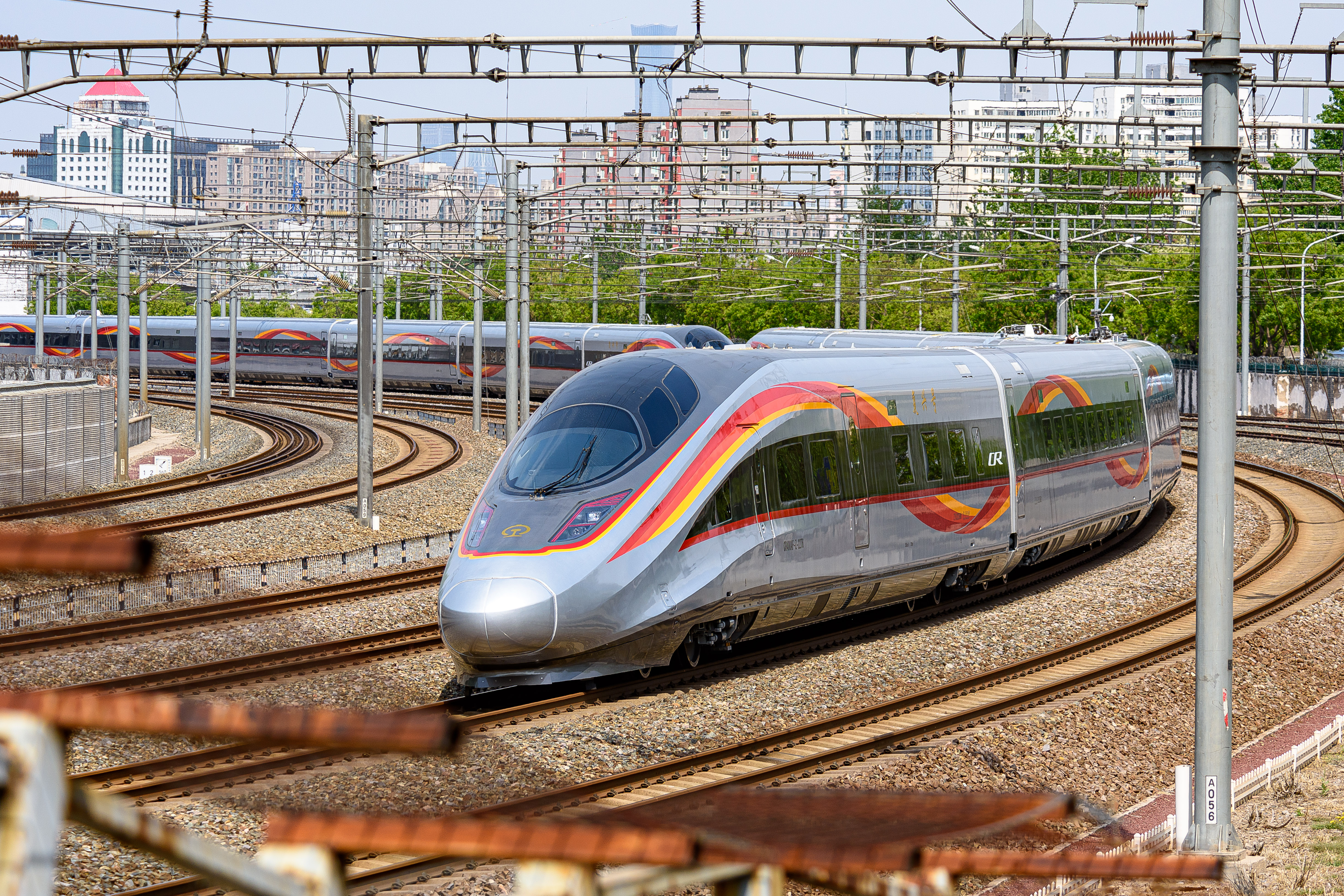
The CR400AF-Z, a newer version of the CR400AF, with a new exterior and interior.

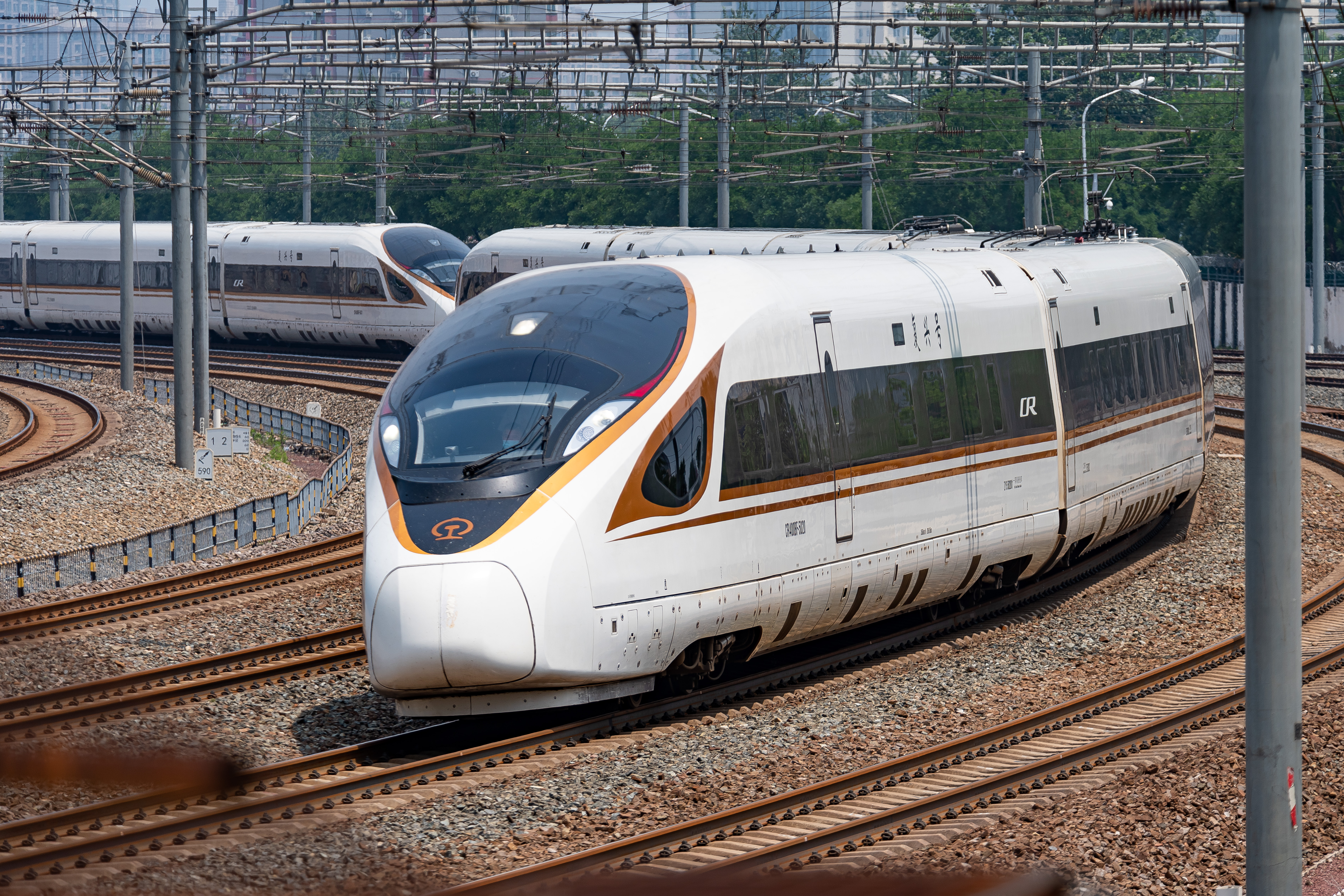
The CR400BF

The CR400BF-C is a variant of the CR400BF, which has Automatic Train Operation technology, thus not needing a driver.

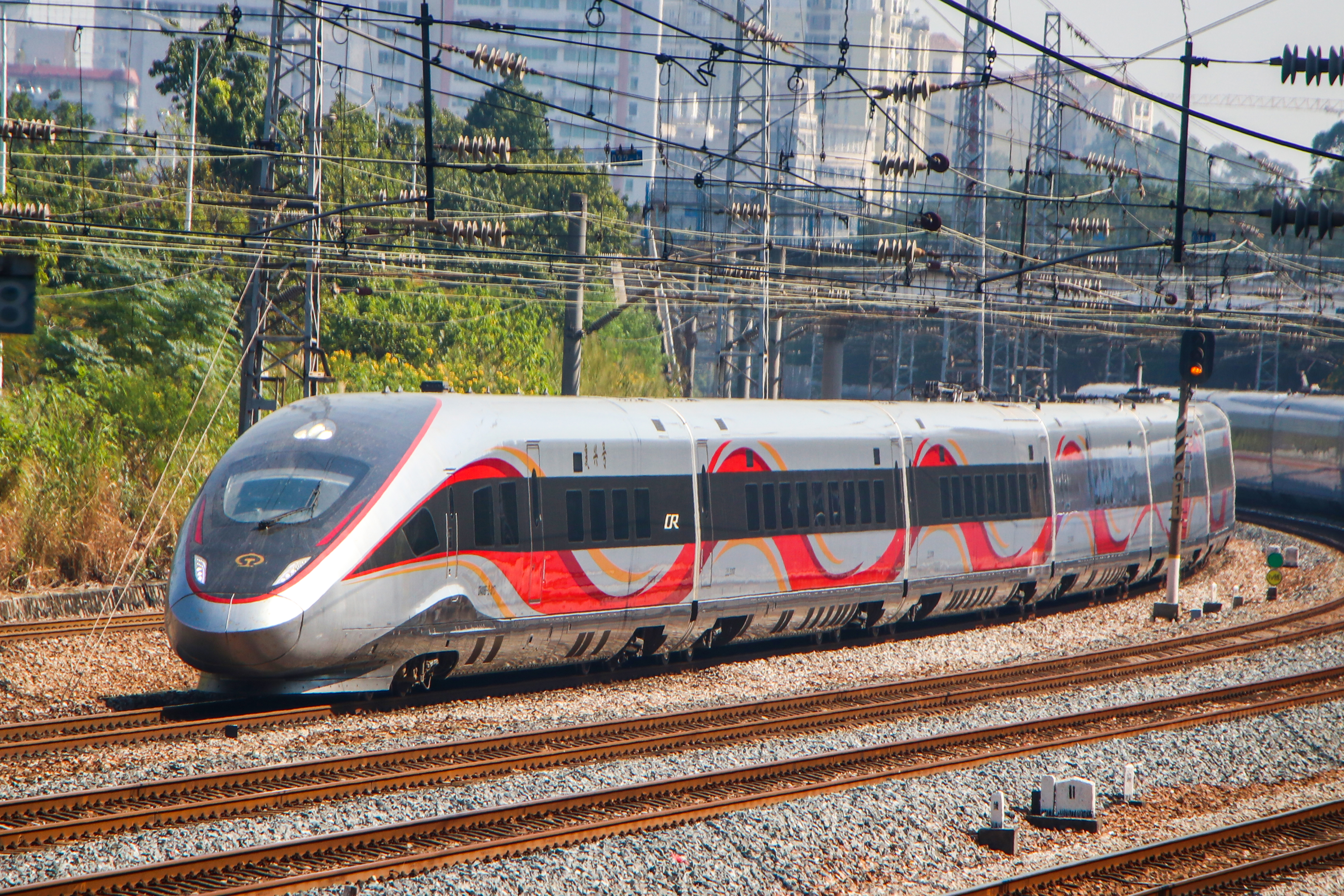
This is the CR400BF-Z, is a variant of the CR400BF, with a new exterior and interior.

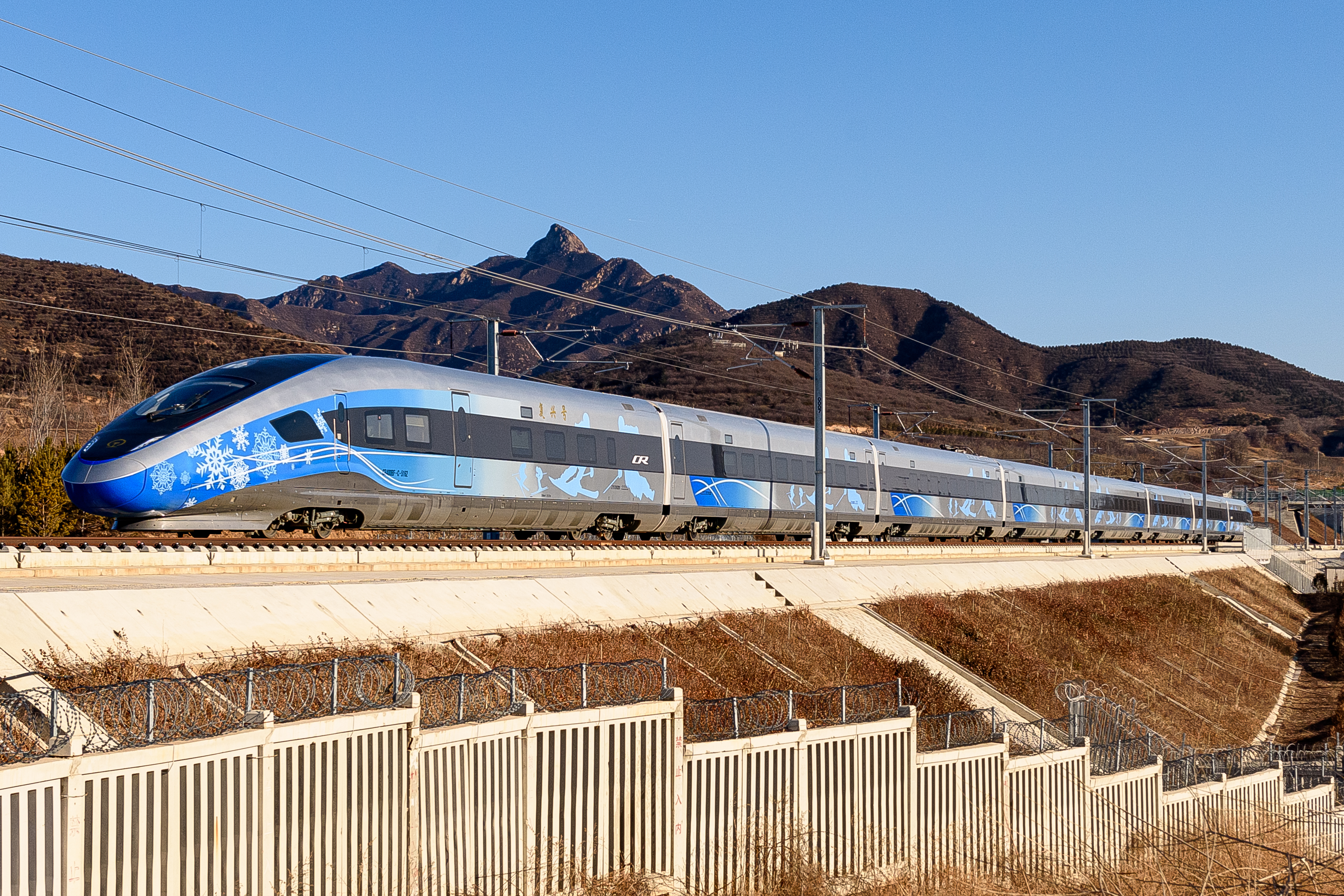
The CR400BF-C, with special Winter Olympics design. It can drive without a driver.

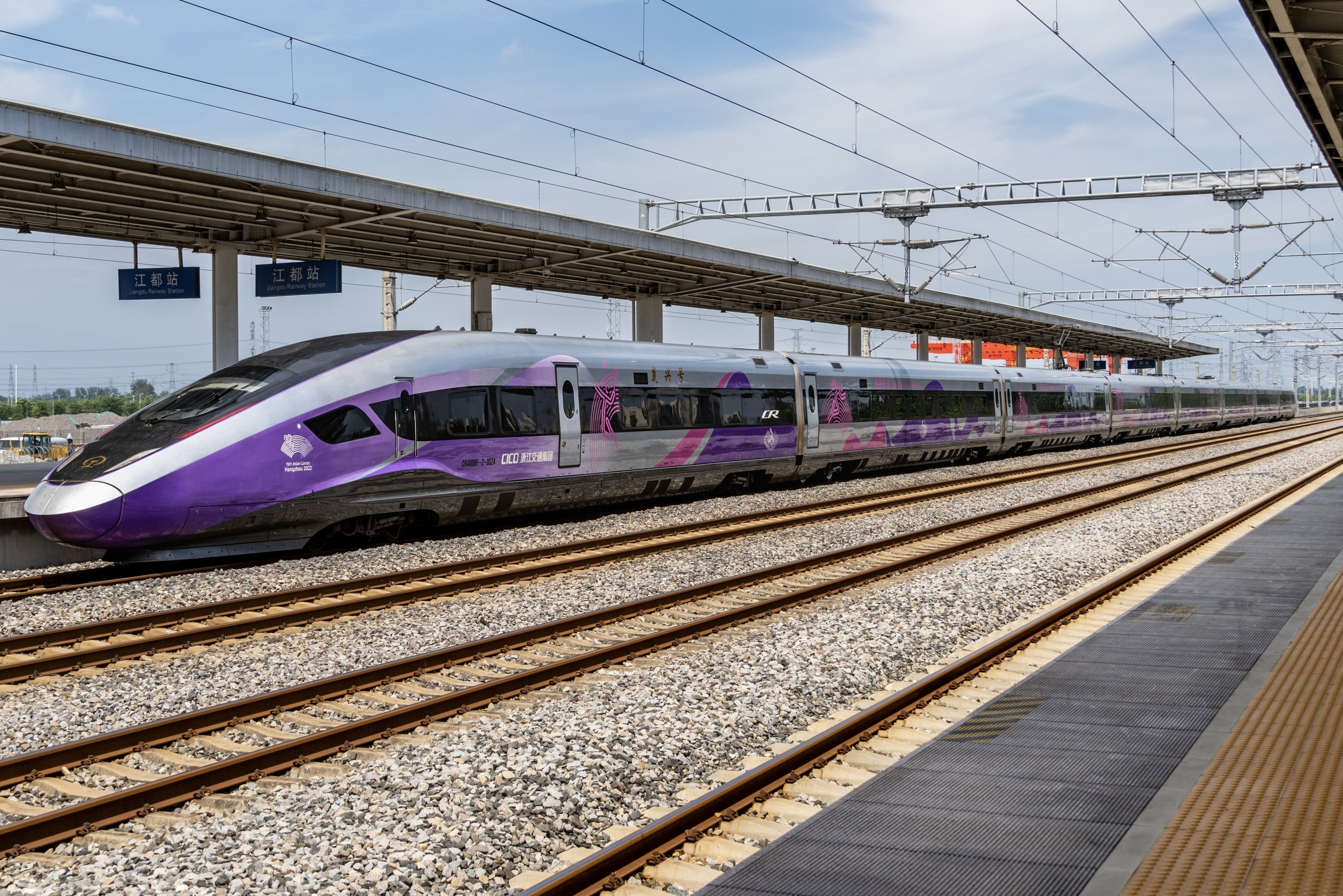
The CR400BF-Z, with special 2022 Asian Games design.

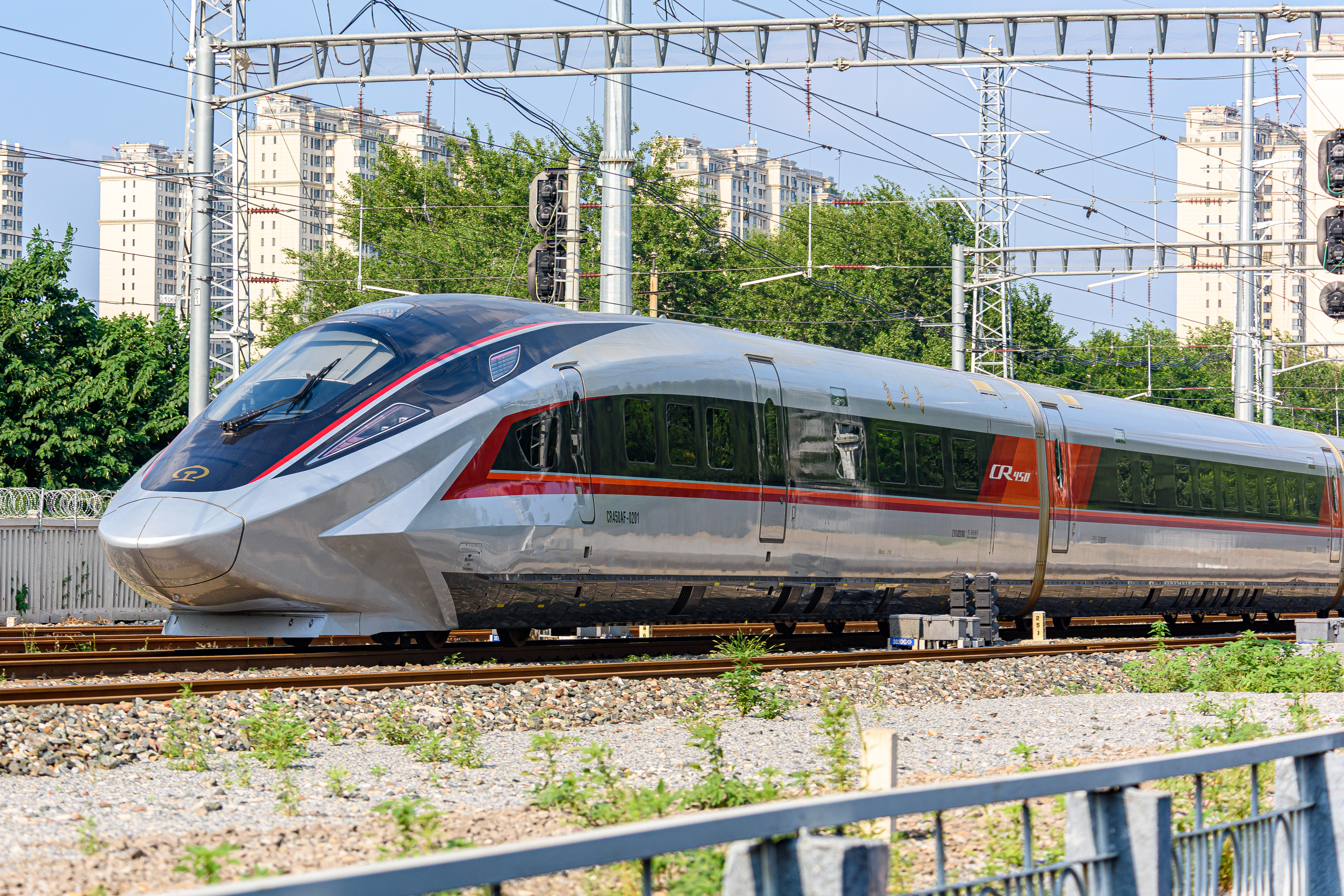
The CR450AF, the fastest of the Fuxing Trains

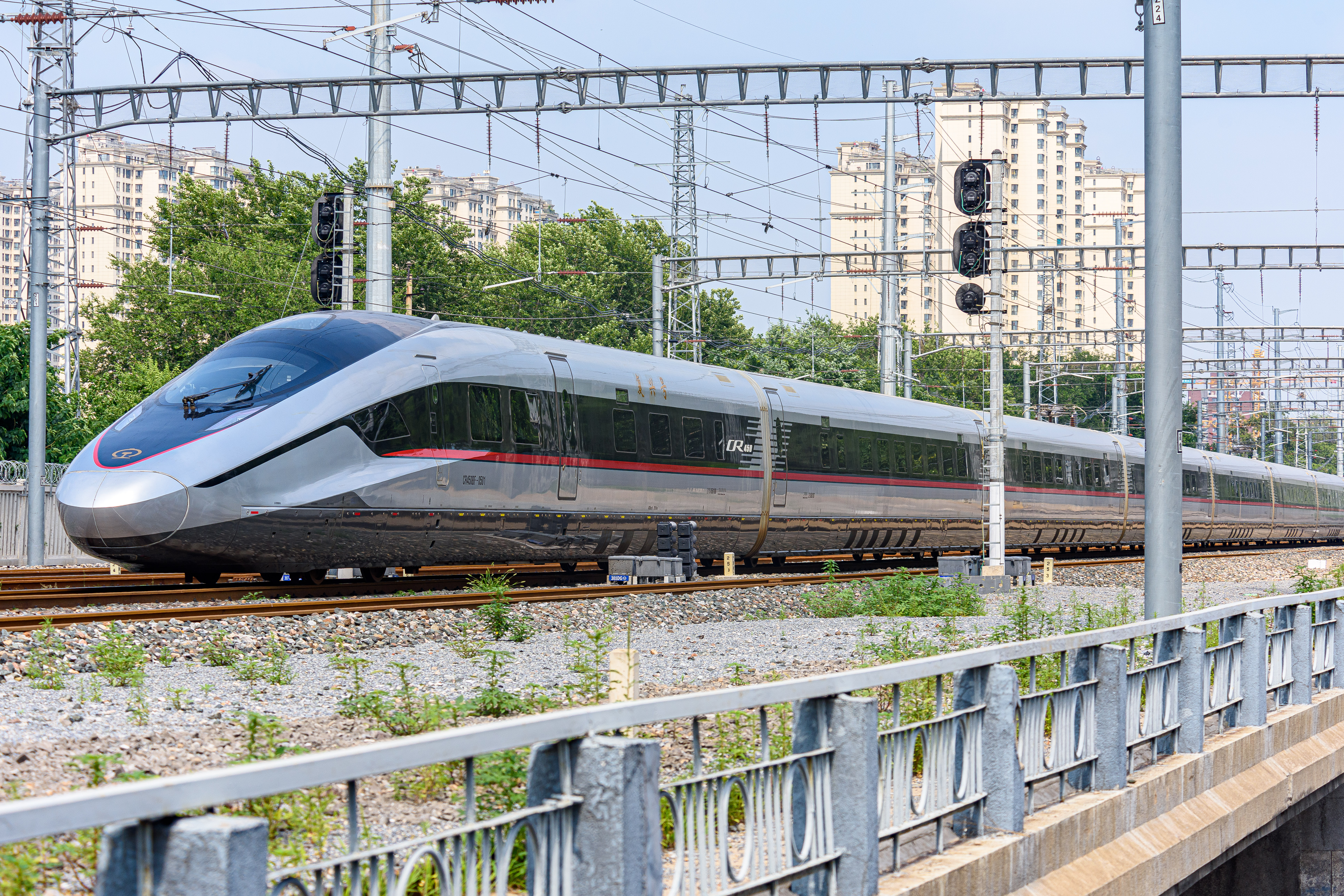
The CR450BF, the fastest of the Fuxing Trains

== Ridership ==
Ridership
Year	million riders	±% p.a.
2007	61	—
2008	128	+109.84%
2009	179	+39.84%
2010	290	+62.01%
2011	440	+51.72%
2012	486	+10.45%
2013	672	+38.27%
2014	893	+32.89%
2015	1,161	+30.01%
2016	1,443	+24.29%
2017	1,713	+18.71%
2018	2,005	+17.05%
2019	2,290	+14.21%
2020		—
2021		—
2022	1,275	—
2023	2,940	+130.59%
2024	3,272	+11.29%
Source: 2008 2010 2011 2014 2015 2016 2017 2018 2019-2021 2022 2023 2024

Annual HSR ridership is highest in the world and has ramped up very quickly, as self-reported by rail authorities. China is the third country, after Japan and France, to have reached one billion cumulative HSR passengers. Ridership in 2018 was above 2 billion per year; by 2024 it was above 3 billion per year.

== Technology development ==
Before the introduction of foreign technology, China conducted independent attempts to domestically develop high-speed rail technology. Some notable results included the China Star, but domestic companies lacked the technology and expertise of foreign companies, and the research process consumed a large amount of time. In 2004, the Chinese State Council and the Ministry of Railways defined a modern railway technology and equipment policy as "the introduction of advanced technology, the joint design and production, to build China brand". The realization of the railway "leapfrog development" is the key task required to develop and utilize the technology required for high-speed trains (higher than 200 km/h or 124 mph per hour). In 2007, Chinese state media quoted the People's Republic of China Ministry of Railways spokesman Zhang Shuguang to have stated that due to historical reasons, China's overall railway technology and equipment is similar to that of developed countries' rail systems in the 1970s; high-speed rolling stock development is still in its infancy stage. And that if using only their own resources and expertise, the country might need a decade or longer to catch up with developed nations.

=== Technology introduction ===
On April 9, 2004, the Chinese government held a conference on modern railway equipment and rolling stock, in which they drafted the current Chinese plan to modernize the country's railway infrastructure with advanced technologies.

On June 17, 2004, the Ministry of Railways launched the first round of bidding on the high-speed rail technology, but the company must be:

- legally registered in the PRC, with rail EMU manufacturing capacity
- able to manufacture trains with the ability to reach 200 km/h (124 mph)

High-speed EMU design and manufacturing technology companies, including Siemens, Alstom, Kawasaki Heavy Industries and Bombardier, initially had hoped to enter into a joint venture in China, but was rejected by the Ministry of Railways. The MOR set these guidelines for joint ventures to be acceptable:

- comprehensive transfer of key technologies
- lowest price in the world
- use of a Chinese brand

A comprehensive transfer of technology to Chinese enterprises (especially in systems integration, AC drive and other core technologies) was requested to allow domestic enterprises to access and utilise the core technology. While foreign partners might provide technical services and training, the Chinese companies must ultimately be able to function without the partnership. Railway equipment manufacturers in China were free to choose foreign partners, but foreign firms must pre-bid and sign the technology transfer agreement with China's domestic manufacturers, so the Chinese rolling stock manufacturers could comprehensively and systematically learn advanced foreign technology. However, this requirement to sign over all rights to the technology used in the trains was a significant barrier to international involvement in the project, as the companies would lose access to any technology that they used on the trains.

In the first round of bidding, 140 rolling stock orders were divided into seven packages of twenty orders each. After extensive review and negotiation, three consortiums won the bid:

- Changchun Railway Vehicles Co., Ltd. (owned by CNR) with France's Alstom
- Sifang Locomotive (owned by CSR) with Japan's Kawasaki Heavy Industries
- Sifang Locomotive (owned by CSR) with Canada's Bombardier

These three consortiums were each given three, three, and one twenty order packages respectively. Germany's Siemens, as a result of an expensive technology bid — the prototype vehicle cost was 350 million yuan each column, technology transfer fee 390 million euros — did not get any orders in the first round. EMU tendered 22.7 billion yuan for technology transfer payments in the first payment, accounting for 51 per cent of the amount of the tender.

In November 2005, the Chinese Ministry of Railways and Siemens reached an agreement, and Siemens in a joint venture with Changchun Railway Vehicles and Tangshan Railway Vehicle (both owned by CNR) was awarded sixty 300 km/h (186 mph) high-speed train orders.

=== Innovation ===
The introduction of high-speed trains, a foreign advanced technology, was required in order to implement China's "Long-term Scientific and Technological Development (2006–2020)". The core technology innovations necessary for a high-speed rail system to meet the needs of China's railway development resulted in the Ministry of Science and Ministry of Railways signing the "independent innovation of Chinese high-speed train cooperation agreement Joint Action Plan" on February 26, 2008. Academicians and researchers from CAS, Tsinghua University, Zhejiang University, Southwest Jiaotong University, and Beijing Jiaotong University have committed to working together on basic research into improving China's scientific and industrial resources into developing a high-speed train system.

Under the agreement, China's joint action plan for improvement of train service and infrastructure has four components:

1. Develop key technologies to create a network capable of supporting trains' speeds of 350 km/h (217 mph) and higher
2. Establish intellectual property rights and international competitiveness
3. Ministry of Science and the Ministry of Railways will work together to enhance industry research alliances, and innovation capability
4. Promote China-related material and equipment capacity

The Chinese Ministry of Science has invested nearly 10 billion yuan in this science and technology plan, which is by far the largest investment program. The project has brought together a total of 25 universities, 11 research institutes, and national laboratories, and 51 engineering research centers. The Ministry of Science hopes to develop basic research sufficient to produce key technologies necessary to develop trains capable of 500 km/h (310 mph) through the "863 Project" and "973 Project".

=== Technology export ===
On July 27, 2009, Chinese Ministry deputy chief engineer Zhang Shuguang stated that the United States, Saudi Arabia and Brazil are interested in Chinese high-speed railway technology. On July 28, the Federal Railroad Administration and the US government are negotiating on the introduction of Chinese railway technology. On October 14, 2009, Prime minister of Russia Vladimir Putin and the Russian Railroad Administration signed an Organizing and developing railway in Russia memo with Ministry of Railways of China, planning to build a high-speed railway from Vladivostok to Khabarovsk.

The first actual export of Chinese High-Speed Rail technology is the Jakarta - Bandung High-speed Rail of Indonesia with modified Fuxing (KCIC400AF) trainsets and operational speed of 350 km/h. Construction of its first phase, from Eastern Jakarta at Halim to the suburbs of Bandung at Padalarang & Tegalluar, commenced in 2016 and was completed by late 2023. By its first full year of operation the line had carried approximately 5.79 million passengers, with plans to extend the line to Surabaya in preliminary studies as of 2025.

== Accidents ==
- On July 23, 2011 at approximately 20:00 CST, two high-speed trains travelling on the Yongtaiwen railway line No. D301 and No. D3115 bound for Fuzhou collided on a viaduct near Wenzhou, Zhejiang, leading to 40 deaths and 191 injuries. Both trains were on the same rail track, headed in the same direction. D3115 ground to a halt in front of D301 due to a loss of electric power caused by lightning striking a viaduct near the Ou River. Signalling systems purportedly failed, and D301 rear-ended the first train, sending four carriages off the viaduct.
- On June 4, 2022 at 10:30 CST, train D2809 bound for Guangzhou East from Guiyang North ran into a landslide near the Rongjiang Station on the Guiyang-Guangzhou High-speed railway. The driver engaged emergency brake, and two carriages were derailed and hit the platform of Rongjiang Station, killing the driver and injuring 8 passengers. The remaining 136 passengers were safely evacuated. This is the second fatal incident in China's high speed rail history.

== See also ==
- High-speed rail in China
- China Star
- Z-series trains
- Hexie (train)
- Fuxing (train)
