= Zhang Shuguang =

Zhang Shuguang may refer to:

- Zhang Shuguang (engineer) (Chinese: 张曙光; born 1956), deputy chief engineer of the Ministry of Railways and the deputy chief designer of China's high-speed railway
- Zhang Shuguang (general) (Chinese: 张曙光), general officer in the People's Liberation Army Ground Force, current secretary of the Central Military Commission (CMC) Discipline Inspection Commission and director of the CMC Commission of Supervision
- Zhang Shuguang (governor) (Chinese: 张曙光; 1920–2002), party secretary of Inner Mongolia and governor of Hebei
