= Zhang Shuguang (engineer) =

Chinese bureaucrat and financial criminal (born 1956)

Zhang Shuguang (Chinese: 张曙光; born December 1956) was the deputy chief engineer of the Ministry of Railways of China and the deputy chief designer of China's high-speed railway. Zhang was born in Shanghai but is considered a native of his ancestral home of Liyang, Jiangsu by Chinese convention. He graduated from Lanzhou Railway University in 1982.

An associate of former Minister of Railways Liu Zhijun, Zhang was fired in February 2011 soon after Liu was arrested for corruption. In October 2014, Zhang was convicted by a Beijing court of taking bribes worth more than CN¥47 million (US$7.7 million) over a span of 11 years. He was given a suspended death sentence. Liu Zhijun had received the same sentence in 2013. Zhang's deputy Su Shunhu was also convicted of taking bribes and sentenced to life.
