= China Railway CR300BF =

Chinese high-speed train model

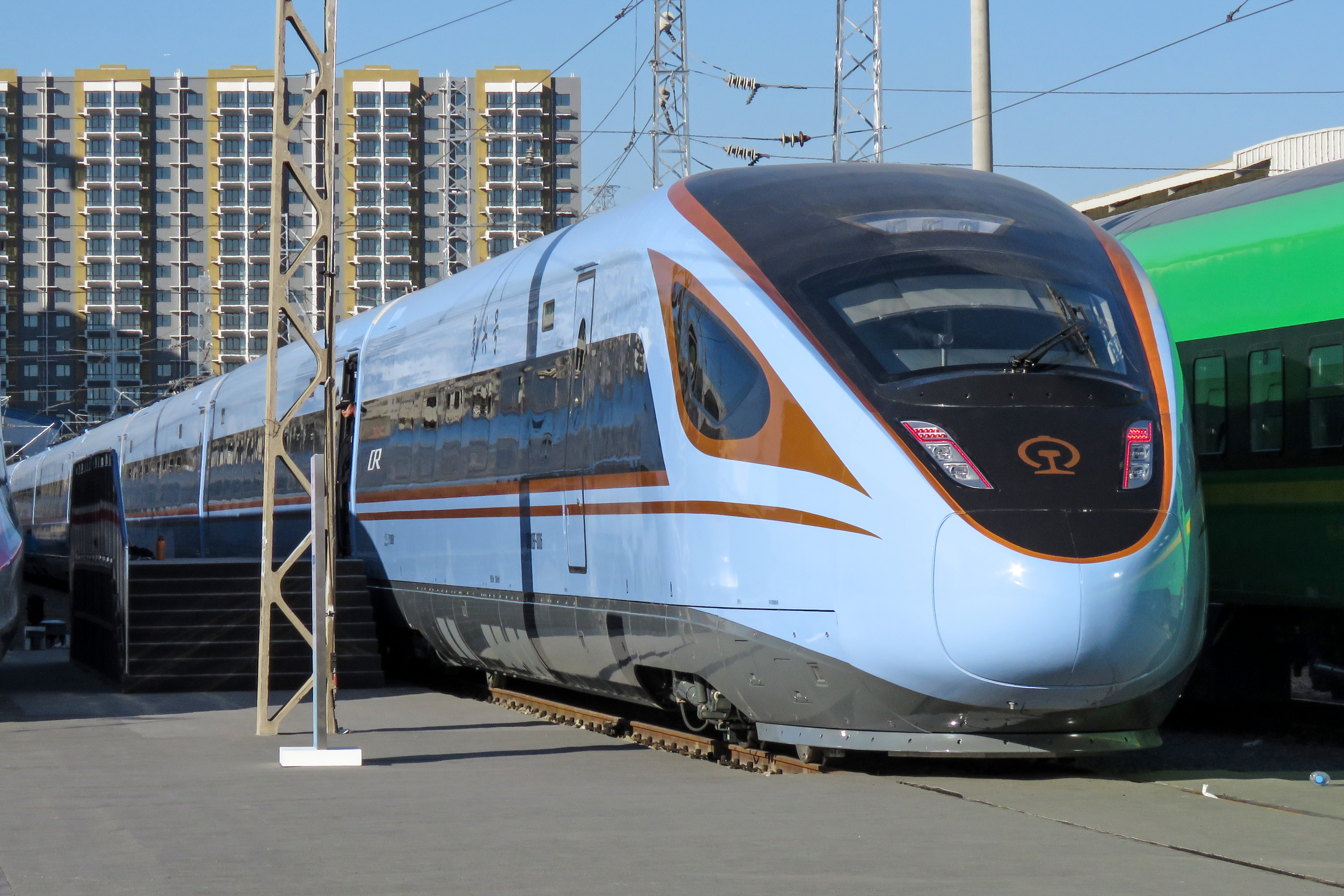
- CR300BF-0006 displayed at Beijing National Railway Test Centre
- In service: 24 December 2020
- Manufacturer: CRRC Tangshan; CRRC Changchun Railway Vehicles
- Replaced: CRH1, CRH2, CRH5
- Formation: 8 cars (4M4T)
- Capacity: 613 (48 first class / 565 second class); 598 (5 business / 28 first class / 565 second class) for AF-1005~1009
- Operators: China Railway

Specifications
- Train length: approx. 209 m (686 ft)
- Maximum speed: Service: 250 km/h (160 mph); Design: 300 km/h (190 mph)
- Traction system: Water cooling IGBT-VVVF inverter control (Zhuzhou CRRC Times Electric)
- Traction motors: YJ-305A CRRC Yongji Electric squirrel-cage three-phase AC motor|three-phase AC traction motors (4×4 units)
- Electric system(s): 25 kV 50 Hz AC Overhead catenary
- Current collection: Pantograph
- Bogies: Bolsterless air spring bogies
- Braking system(s): Regenerative braking, direct electro-pneumatic braking
- Track gauge: 1,435 mm (4 ft 8 1/2 in) standard gauge

The CR300BF Fuxing (Chinese: 复兴号; pinyin: Fùxīng Hào) is one of the electric multiple unit developed for China Railway High-speed network ordered by China Railway from CRRC Changchun Railway Vehicles. All Chinese standard EMUs operating on China's passenger dedicated lines and high-speed railways are named "Fuxing".

== Development ==
The CR300 series Fuxing Hao EMUs (250 km/h class) are the third class of Fuxing Hao EMUs, following the CR400 series (350 km/h class) and CR200J series (160 km/h class).

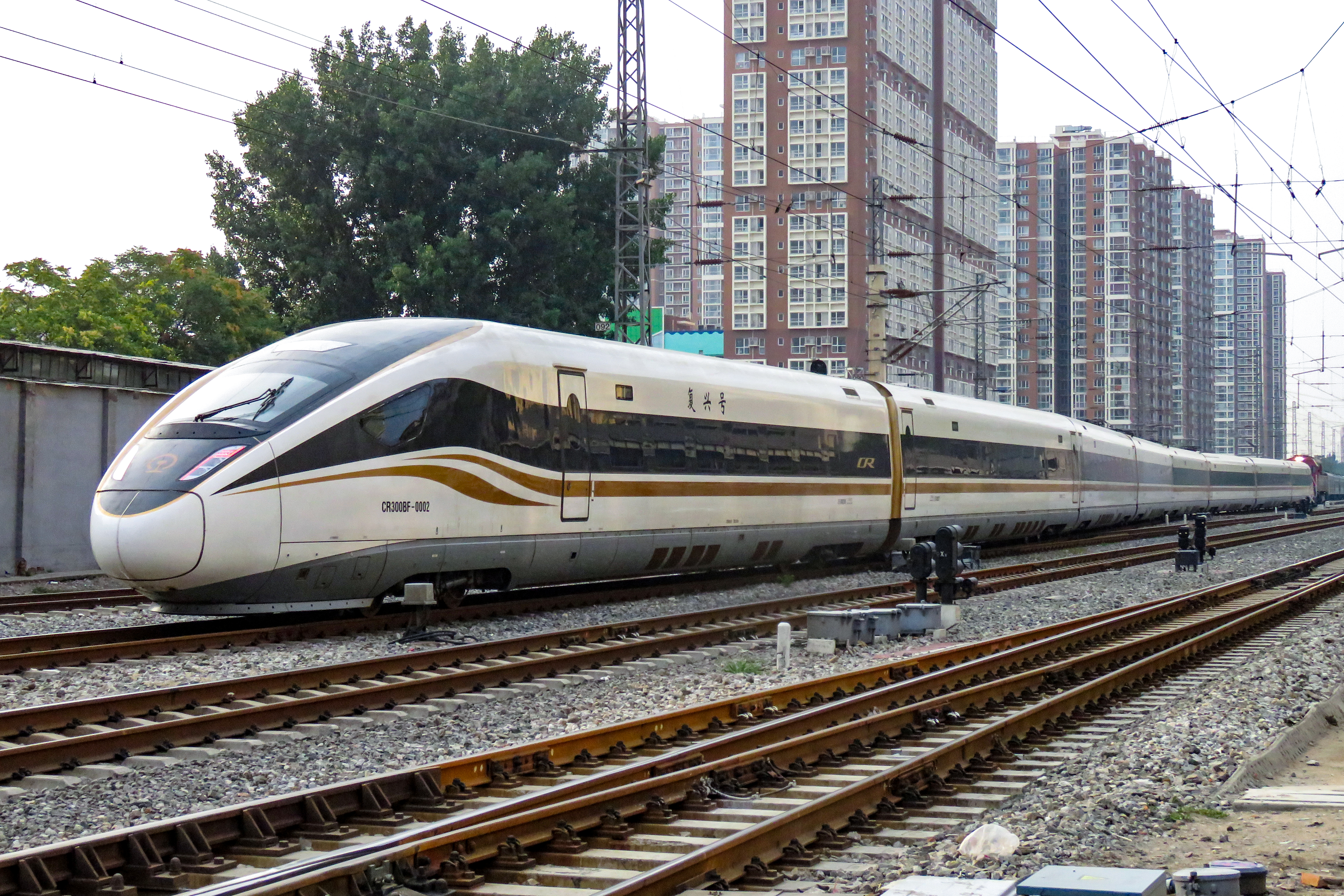
CR300BF-0002 with old livery

In early 2018, design reviews for the CR300 series Fuxing Hao EMUs began. By the end of September 2018, the CR300BF-0002 prototype was manufactured and rolled off the production line. On October 17, the 0002 prototype was transferred without power to the Beijing National Railway Test Centre for testing. On December 8, unit 0002 was transferred to Chengdu railway station. On December 12, unit 0002 began test runs on the Chengdu–Guiyang High-Speed Railway section between Leshan railway station and Xingwen railway station, which was undergoing joint commissioning and testing.

On December 17, 2019, the National Railway Administration approved CRRC Tangshan for mass production of the CR300BF type EMU.

In May 2020, China Railway officially ordered 60 CR300BF units from CRRC, with Changchun Railway Vehicles manufacturing 45 units and Tangshan manufacturing 15 units.

On December 24, 2020, the CR300BF entered service for the first time. Train C3887, operated by a CR300BF unit, departed from Nanjing South railway station via the Shanghai–Nanjing Intercity Railway and Lianyungang–Zhenjiang High-Speed Railway to its destination, Ganyu railway station.

== Design ==
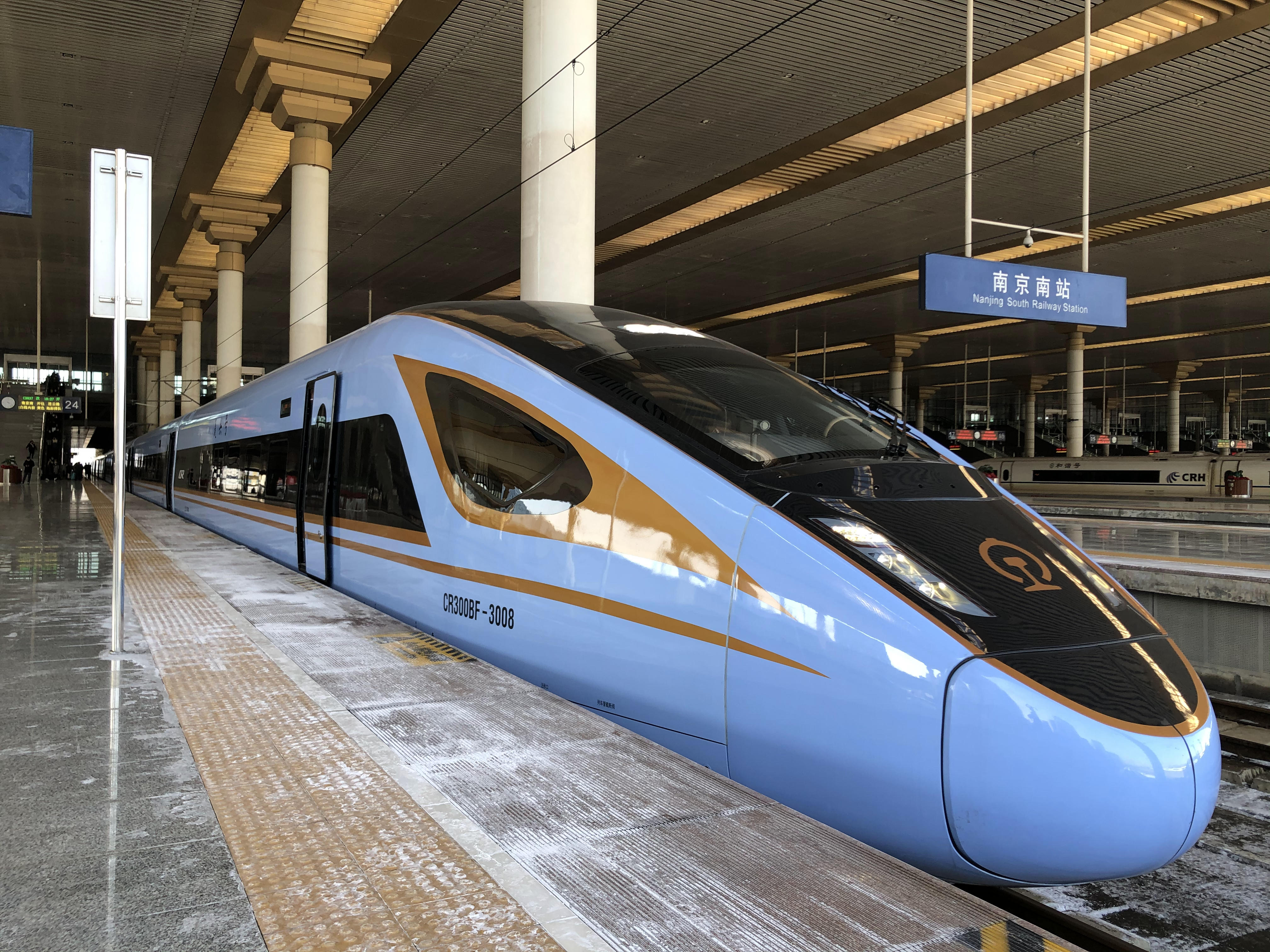
CR300BF-3008 stopped at Nanjing South railway station.

=== Exterior ===
The CR300BF Fuxing Hao EMU is manufactured by CRRC Changchun Railway Vehicles and adopts an 8-car formation with 4 motor cars and 4 trailer cars. The first prototype of the CR300BF featured an exterior livery with a white base color and gold stripes, similar to the CR400BF EMU, but with a different (slightly ribbon-like) design, giving it a more dynamic and streamlined visual appearance.

=== Power configuration ===
The CR300BF adopts an 8-car formation with a 4M4T (4 motor cars, 4 trailer cars) power configuration, consisting of two basic power units. Cars 02, 04, 05, and 07 are motor cars, while cars 01, 03, 06, and 08 are trailer cars.

=== Key equipment ===
==== Pantograph and power supply system ====
The CR300BF is equipped with pantographs on cars 3 and 6. One pantograph is used during normal operation, while two are used for multiple-unit operation.

=== Interior ===
The CR300BF EMU features first-class and second-class cars. The width of the two-person seats in second class is 991 mm, the three-person seats in second class is 1480 mm, and the first-class seats is 1190 mm. Between the two cushions of the three-person seats in second class, there are two power outlets, each integrating one three-pin, one two-pin, and one USB port. Additionally, the waste bins inside the train are divided into recyclable and non-recyclable waste according to waste sorting principles. The entire train is equipped with high-sensitivity temperature sensors to control smart air conditioning, and each car has Wi-Fi antennas, providing wireless internet service.

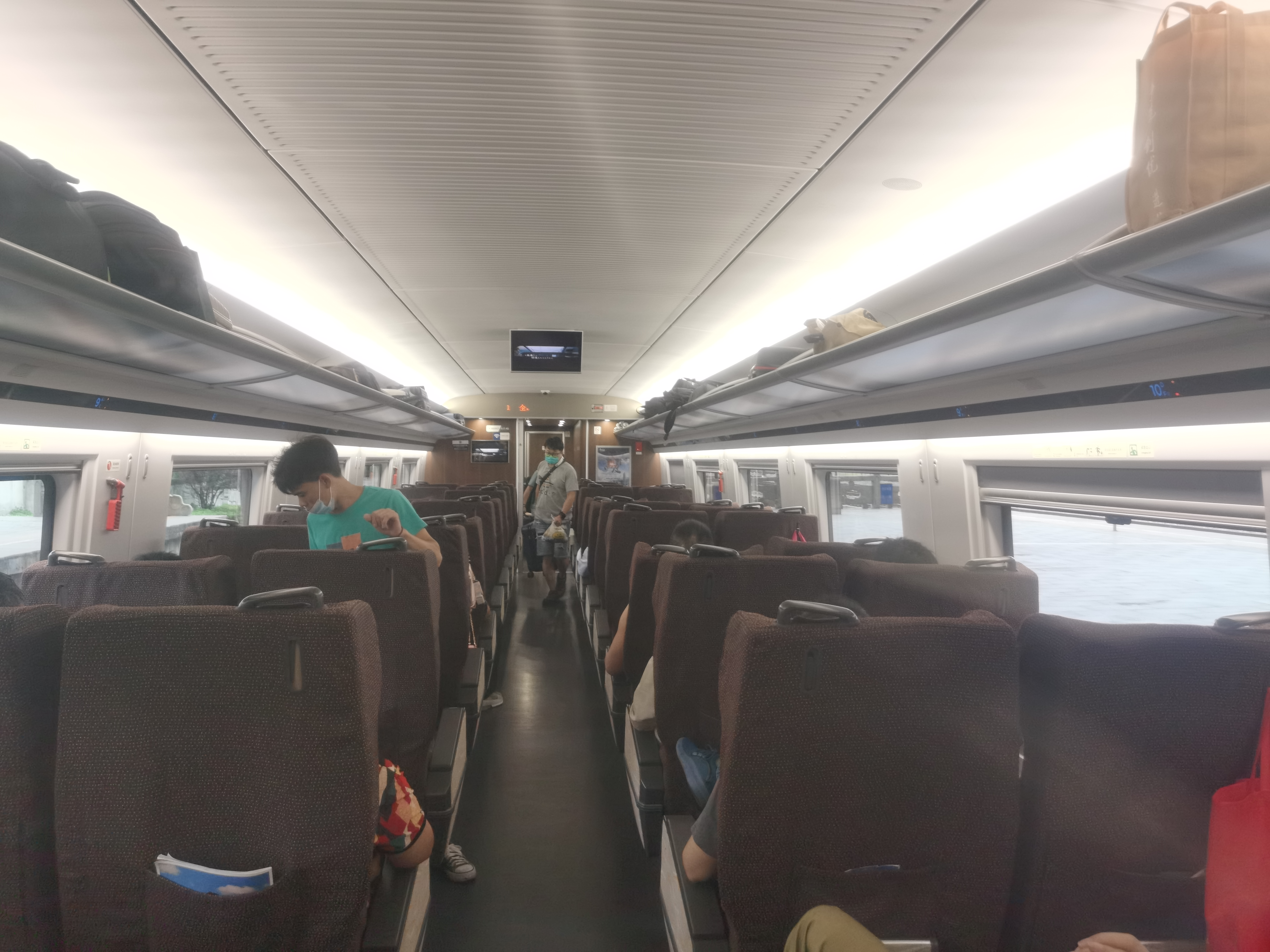
Interior of CR300BF first class

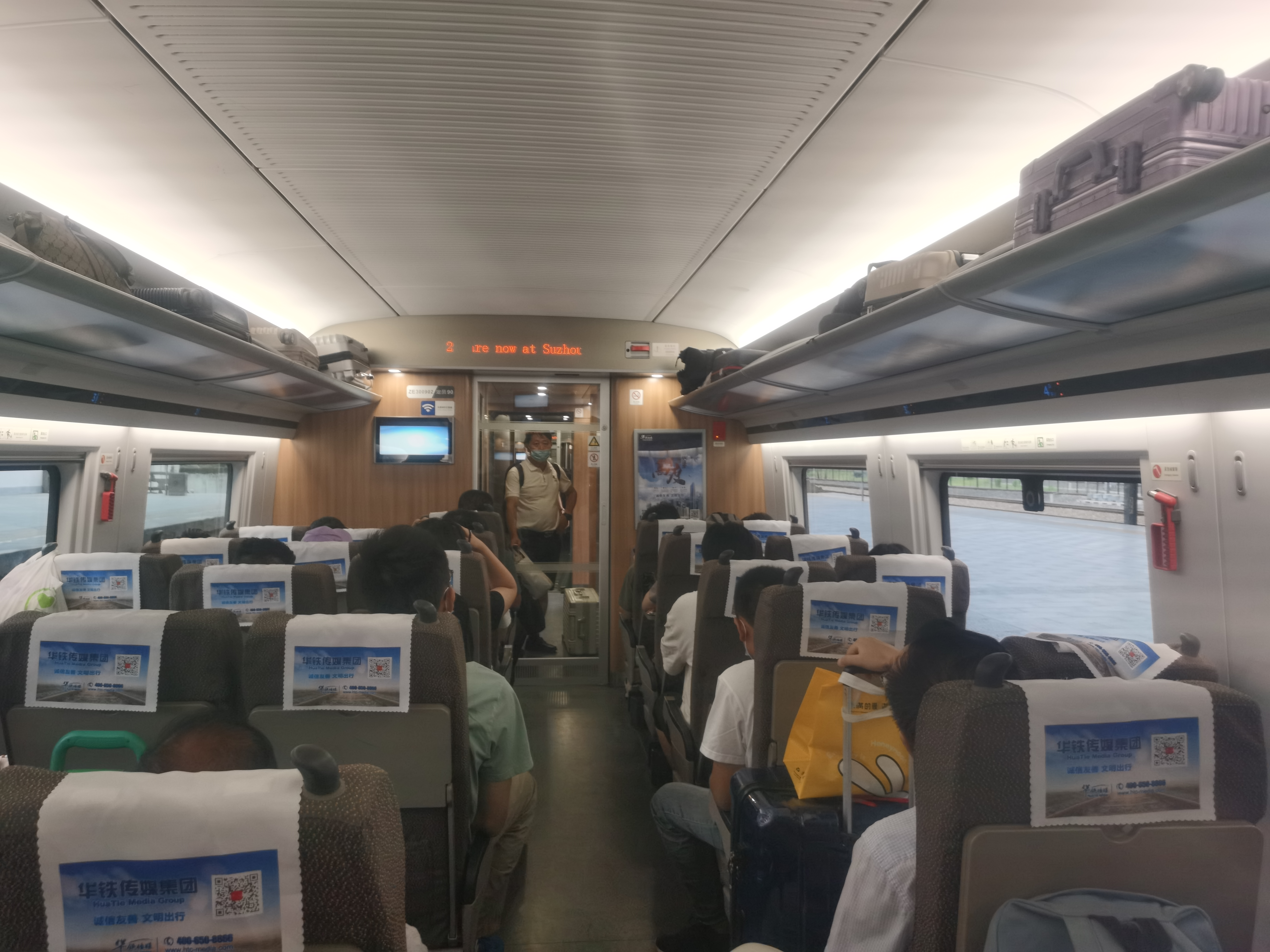
Interior of CR300BF second class

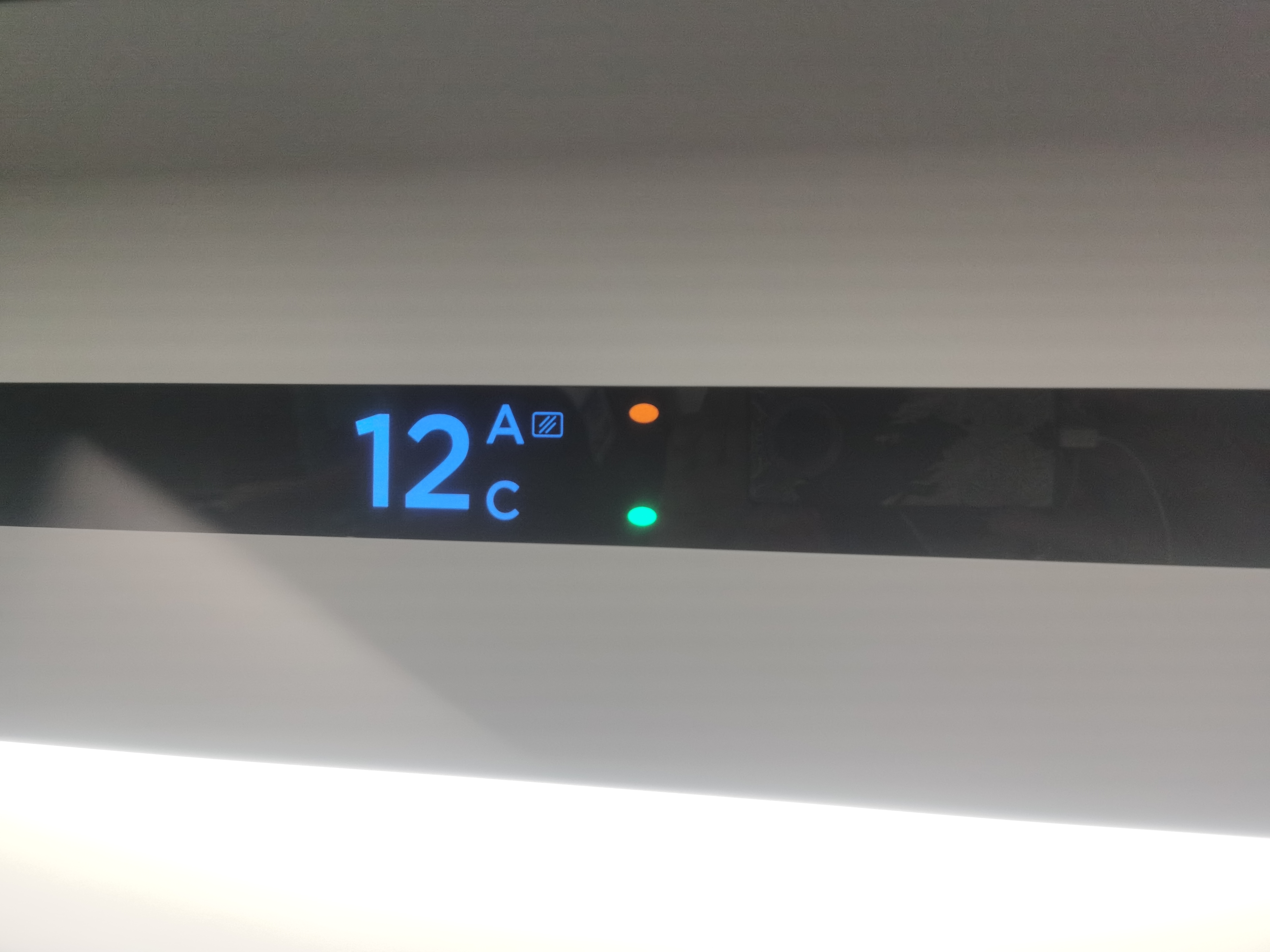
CR300BF seat indicator lights, showing reservation status

== Allocation ==
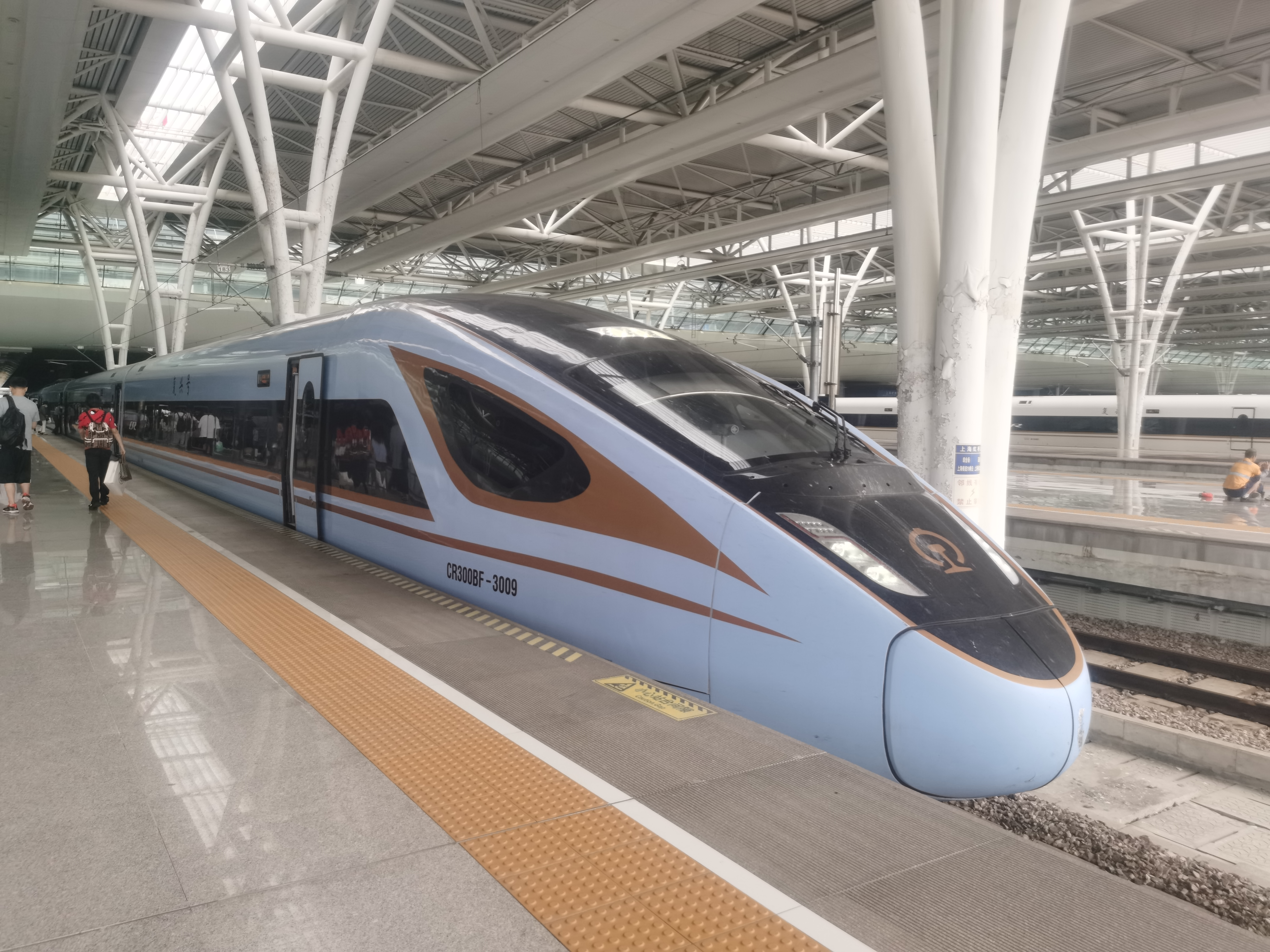
CR300BF-3009 stopped at Shanghai Hongqiao railway station.

As of January 2021, a total of 71 CR300BF Fuxing Hao EMUs have been delivered.

- Units 0002, 0005, 0006 are prototypes.
- Units 3xxx are production units manufactured by CRRC Tangshan.
- Units 5xxx are production units manufactured by CRRC Changchun Railway Vehicles.

Allocation	Quantity	Unit numbers	Depot	Notes
CR300BF
CR Xi'an	41	0002, 0005, 0006, 3001–3009, 3014–3023, 5014–5016, 5023–5034, 5037, 5040–5042	Xi'an North	0002, 0005, 0006 are prototypes.
CR Lanzhou	7	3010–3013, 3024–3026	Yinchuan	
CR Shanghai	15	5001–5013, 5035, 5036	Nanjing South	
CR Zhengzhou	8	5017–5022, 5038, 5039	Zhengzhou East	

== Formation ==
Carriage types

- ZY: First Class Coach
- ZE: Second Class Coach
- ZEC: Second Class Coach / Dining Car

Meaning of abbreviations

- Z: Zuo (Pinyin), 座, seat, coach
- Y: Yi (Pinyin), 一, one, first class
- E: Er (Pinyin), 二, two, second class
- C / CA: Can (Pinyin), 餐, dining, dining car

=== CR300BF ===
Car No.	1	2	3	4	5	6	7	8
Carriage type	First Class Car	Second Class Car			Second Class Car/Dining Car	Second Class Car		
Car number	CR300BF-xxxx; ZY xxxx01	ZE xxxx02	ZE xxxx03	ZE xxxx04	ZEC xxxx05	ZE xxxx06	ZE xxxx07	CR300BF-xxxx; ZE xxxx00
Capacity	48	90	90	77	63	90	90	65
Power configuration	Trailer car with cab (Tc)	Motor car (M)	Trailer car, with pantograph (Tp)	Motor car (M)	Motor car (M)	Trailer car, with pantograph (Tp)	Motor car (M)	Trailer car with cab (Tc)
Power unit	Unit 1				Unit 2			

- xxxx: Trainset number (0002, 0006).

== See also ==
- CRH1A-A Harmony EMU
- Fuxing (train)
  - CR400AF
  - CR400BF
  - CR300AF
  - CR200J
