= Beijing National Railway Test Centre =

China National Railway Test Centre
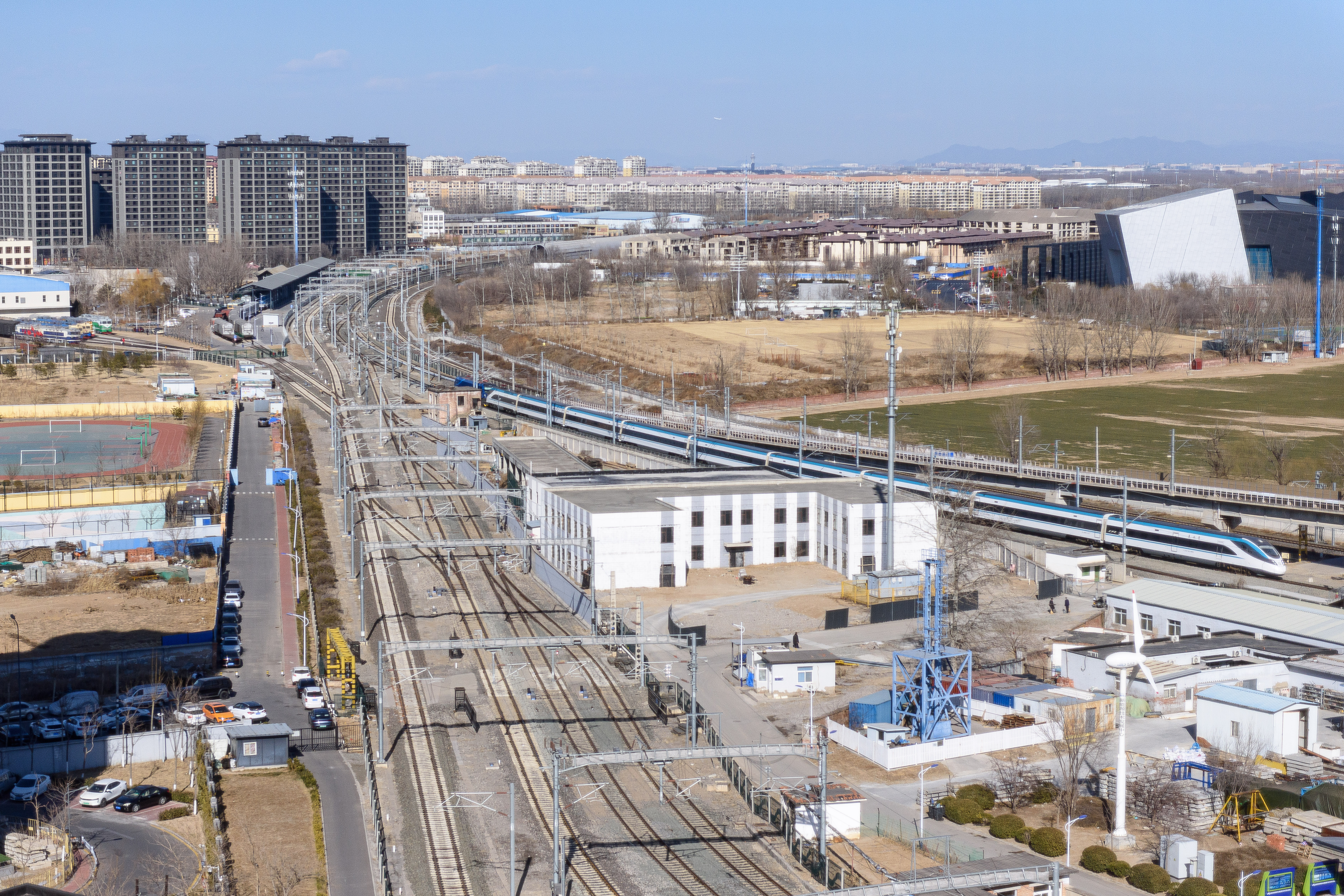
- A CR220J running on the circular test track, with the China Railway Museum (East Suburb Branch) and China National Film Museum visible.

Overview
- Owner: China Railway
- Locale: Chaoyang District, Beijing, China

Service
- Operator(s): China Academy of Railway Sciences Group Co., Ltd.

History
- Opened: 15 January 1958

Technical
- Track gauge: 1,435 mm (4 ft 8 1/2 in) standard gauge
- Electrification: 25 kV AC, 50 Hz, overhead catenary (Outer ring); 1,500 V DC, both overhead catenary and Third Rail (allow to switch to 600-750 V per special purposes) (Inner ring)

The China National Railway Test Centre (Dongjiao Branch), formerly known as the China Academy of Railway Sciences Circular Railway Test Base, commonly abbreviated as Beijing Circular Railway or Huantie, is a large comprehensive railway test base located near the Northeast Fifth Ring Road in Chaoyang District, Beijing, China. It is currently the only circular railway test track in China and Asia. Completed in 1958, it features 38 kilometres (24 mi) of railway lines and scientific research laboratories, covering a total area of 64 hectares (160 acres), and is managed by China Academy of Railway Sciences Group Co., Ltd.. Its main purpose is to conduct comprehensive testing on various aspects, including rolling stock, urban rail transit vehicles, infrastructure, communication signals, and railway electrification technology. All new railway vehicles, after leaving the factory, must enter the test base via the dedicated line from Beijing Chaoyang railway station (formerly Xinghuo Station) on the Shuangsha railway to the China Academy of Railway Sciences Dongjiao Branch for performance and safety evaluations.

The lines within the test centre include an outer loop, an inner loop, yard lines, wyes, connecting lines, and loop entry lines. The largest outer loop is 9 km (5.6 mi) long, with a radius of 1,852 m (6,076 ft), and a constant curve radius of 1,432 m (4,698 ft) throughout its length. The inner loop is approximately 8.5 km (5.3 mi) long, consisting of one straight section and three curved sections with radii of 350 m (1,150 ft), 600 m (2,000 ft), and 1,000 m (3,300 ft). All circular lines are electrified.

Near the test centre is the China Railway Museum (East Suburb Branch), and to the east of the inner side of the circular line is the Beijing Chaoyang EMU Depot. Additionally, due to the test base's proximity to the famous 798 Art Zone, and because some artists felt that 798 had become overly commercialized, they gradually established their living and creative bases in abandoned railway warehouses within the circular railway area, which encompasses over 140 ha (350 acres) of land. This slowly formed a distinctive "Huantie Art Zone". The land within this area may also be gradually developed.

== History ==
- 1956: After the establishment of the People's Republic of China, there was an urgent need to build and repair railways damaged by war. Additionally, the Baoji–Chengdu railway was planned for electrification, but there was a lack of a place to conduct railway technology tests, such as for electrified railways. Approved by then-Minister of Railways Teng Daiyuan, construction of the circular railway began in October 1956, with the first phase completed in November 1957.
- 15 January 1958: The circular railway officially opened.
- 16 May 1959: The electrification project of the circular railway was completed, and China's first electric locomotive, the 6Y1 type, was tested here.
- 1959: Guo Moruo, then-President of the Chinese Academy of Sciences, inspected the test base.
- 25 November 1983: The first 10,000-ton heavy-haul freight train test was conducted, hauled by SS1 electric locomotive and SS3 electric locomotive.
- 30 April 1990: Zou Jiahua, then-Minister of the Ministry of Machine-Building and Electronics Industry, and Li Senmao, Minister of Railways, inspected the 25A type air-conditioned passenger car at the test base.
- 20 December 1991: The circular line's upgrade to a 160 km/h quasi-high-speed standard was completed.
- 17 March 1993: The China Railways DF11 diesel locomotive underwent its first test on the circular line, reaching a top speed of 167 km/h (104 mph).
- 11 April 1994: The DF11 diesel locomotive reached a maximum test speed of 183 km/h (114 mph) on the circular railway, setting the record for the "fastest speed on Chinese railways" at the time.
- January 1997: The China Railways SS8 electric locomotive reached a top speed of 212.6 km/h (132.1 mph) at the test base, breaking the Chinese locomotive speed record.
- 3 December 2003: Tests for increasing freight train speeds to 120 km/h (75 mph) began.
- 12 May 2006: The CRH2 EMU began testing.
- 17 December 2007: The major renovation project of the railway test base's lines was completed. The line quality reached national first-class trunk line standards, allowing EMUs to conduct high-speed tests.

== Gallery ==
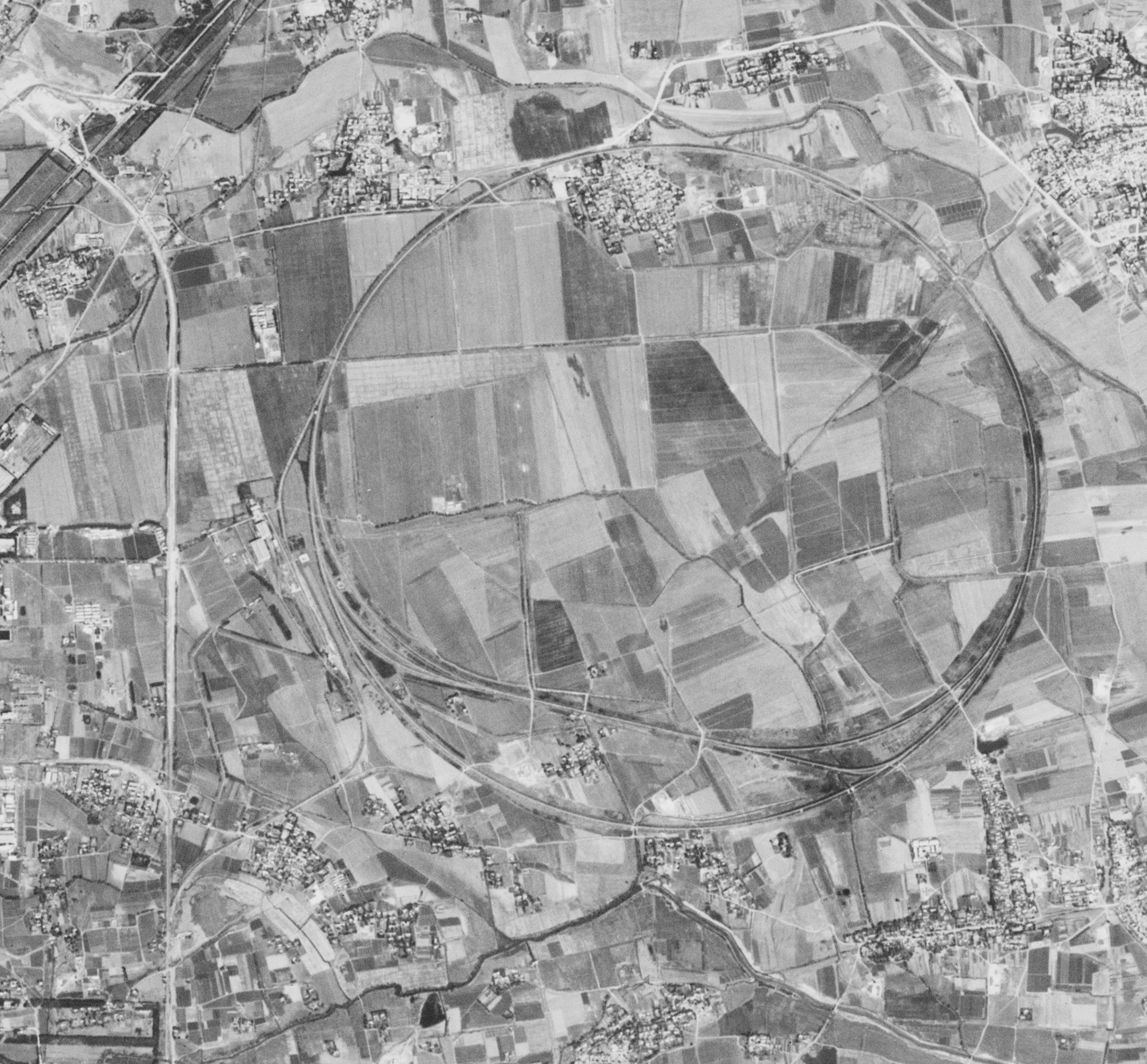
Satellite image of the circular railway (September 20, 1967)

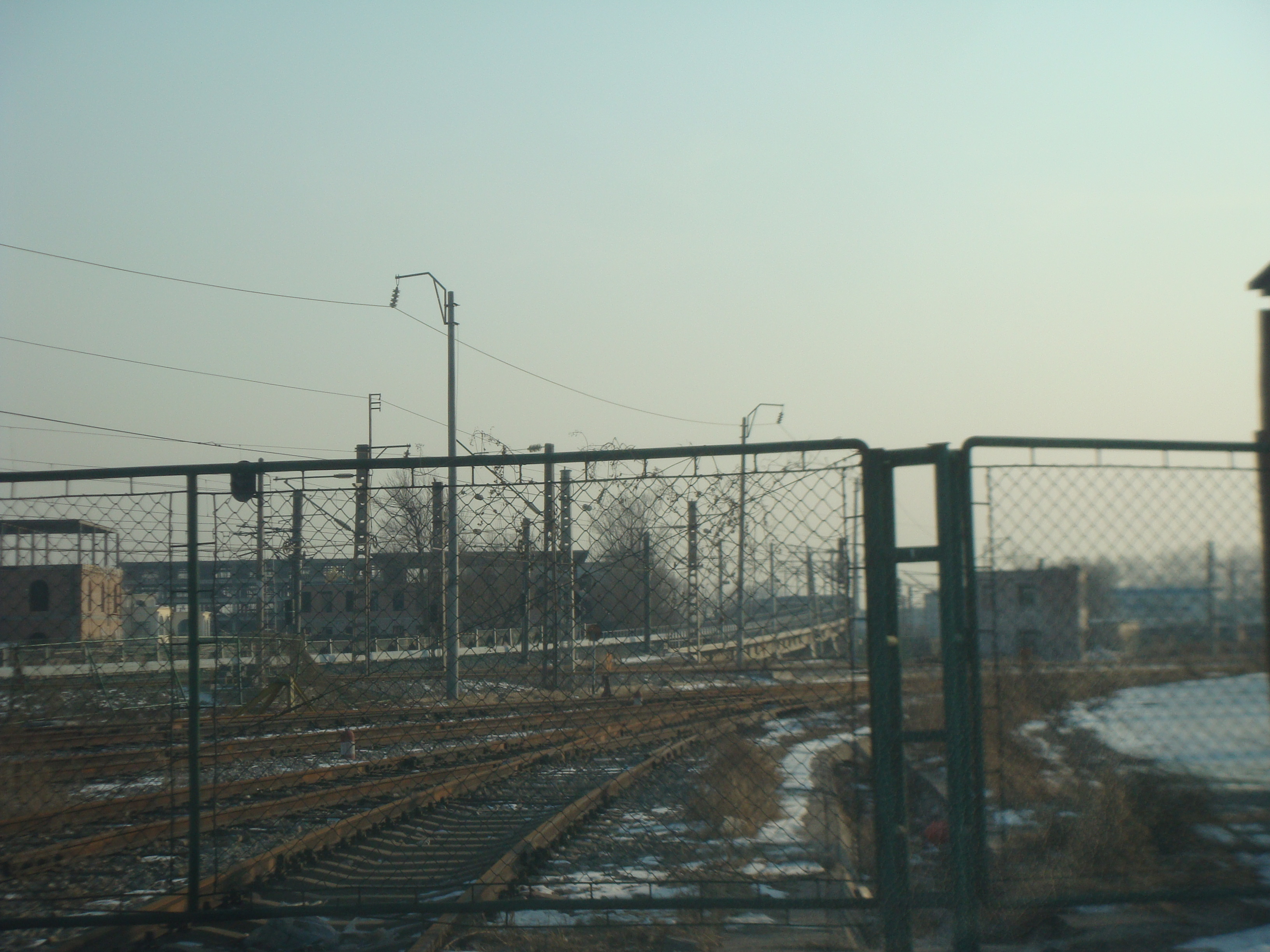
The elevated track in the distance is the circular railway test line.

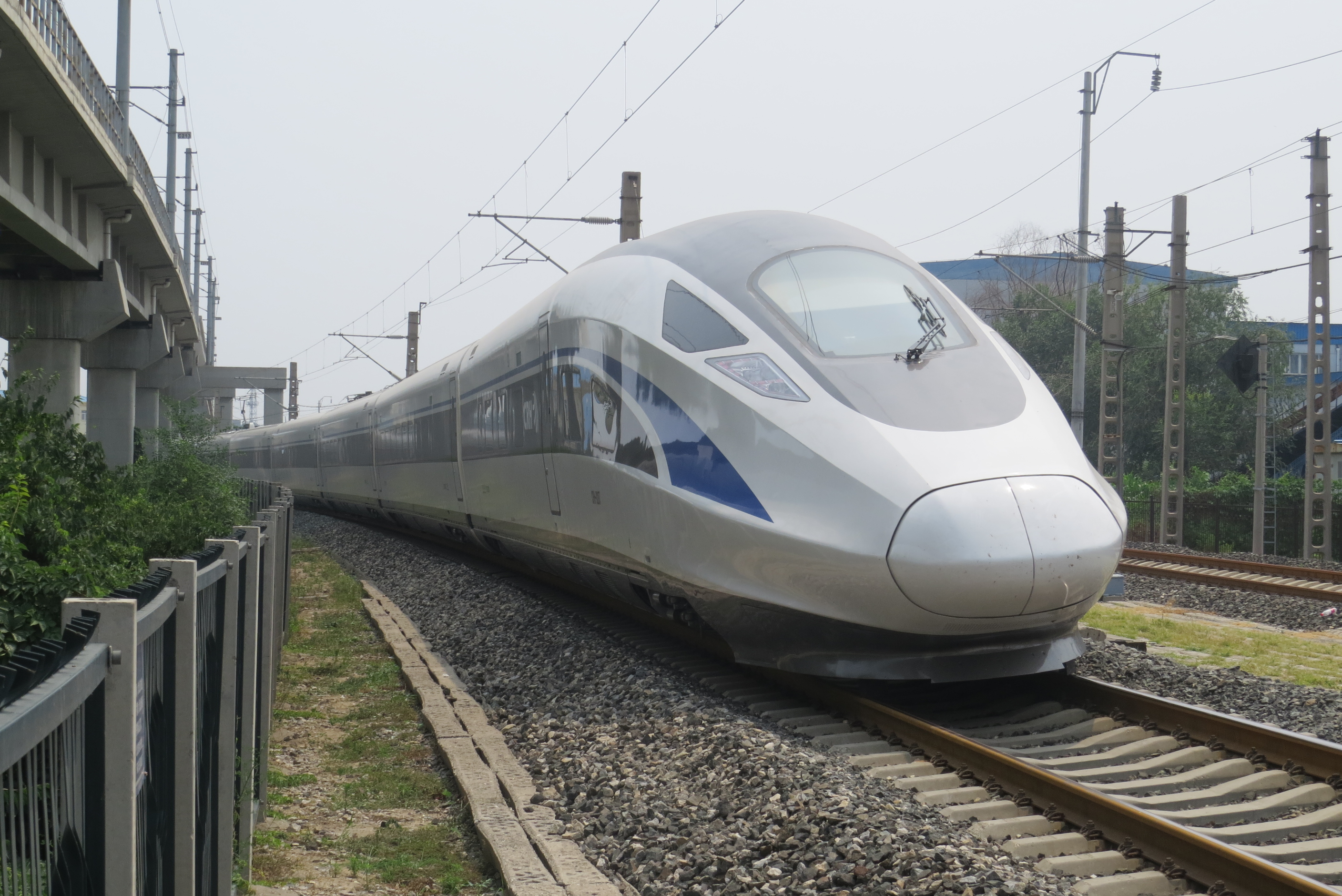
A China Standardized EMU (CRH-0207, manufactured by CSR Sifang) undergoing tests on the circular railway.

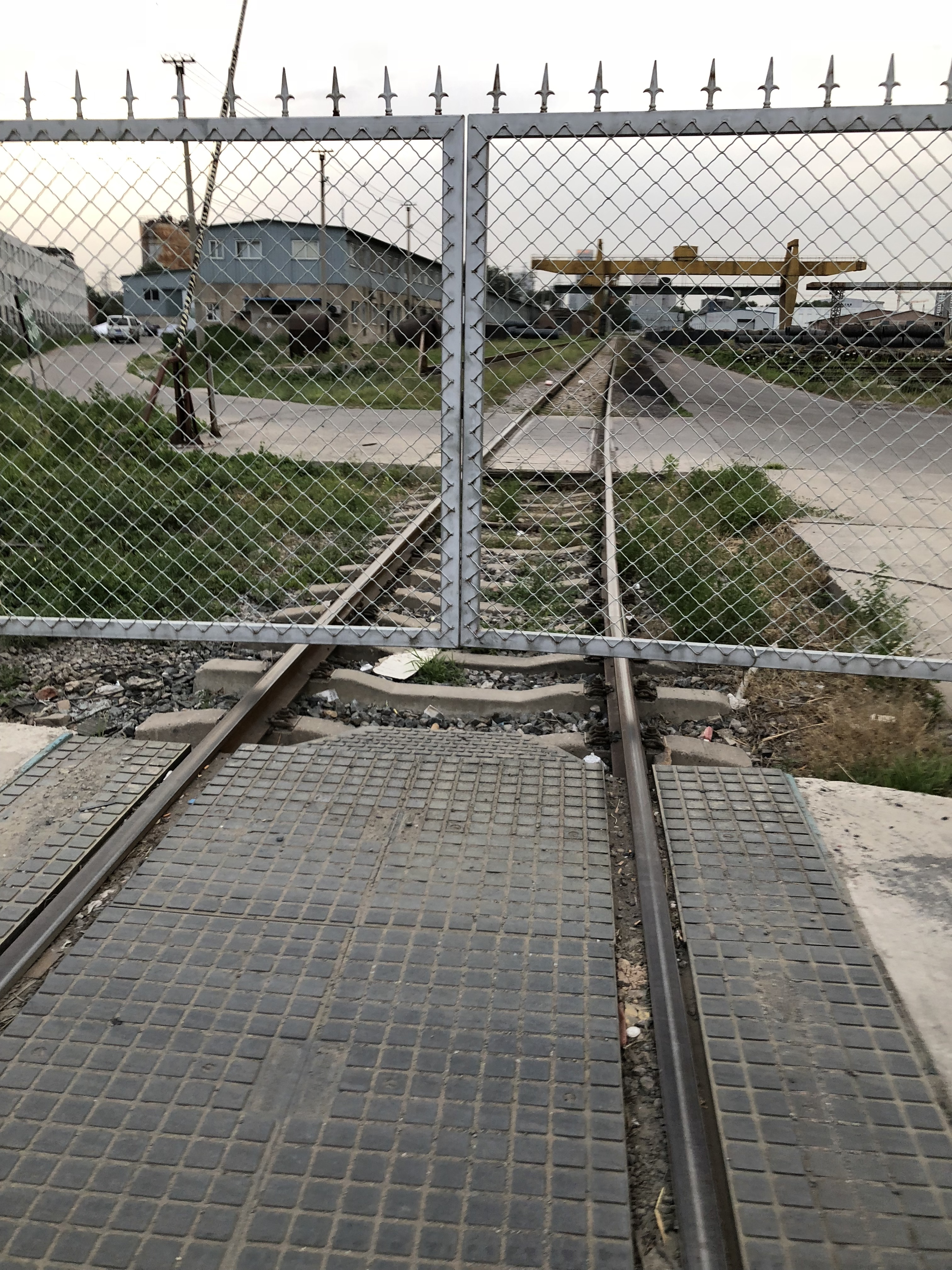
Iron gate outside the circular railway test site.

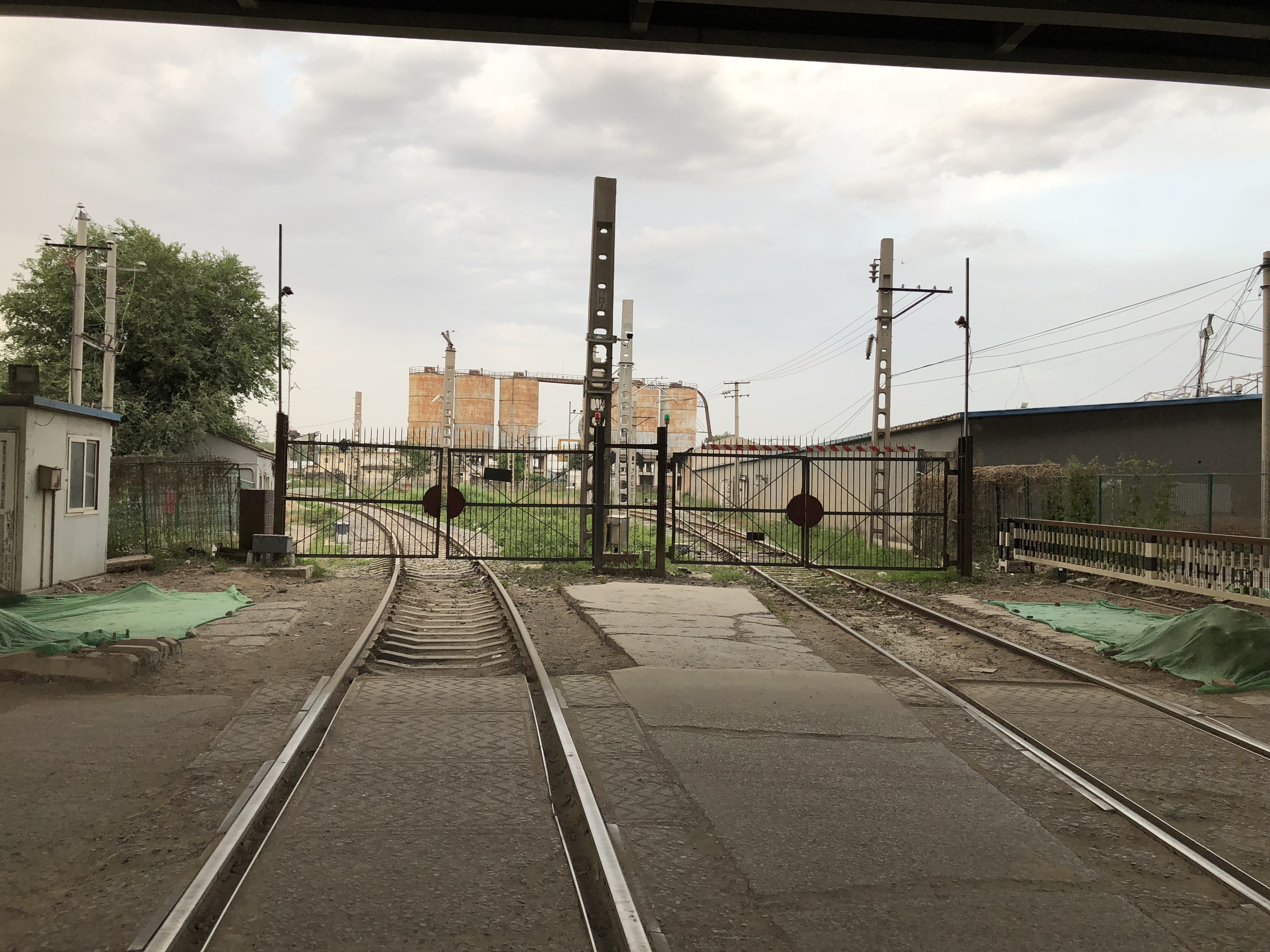
Iron gate outside the circular railway test site.
