= China Railway CR300AF =

Chinese high-speed train model

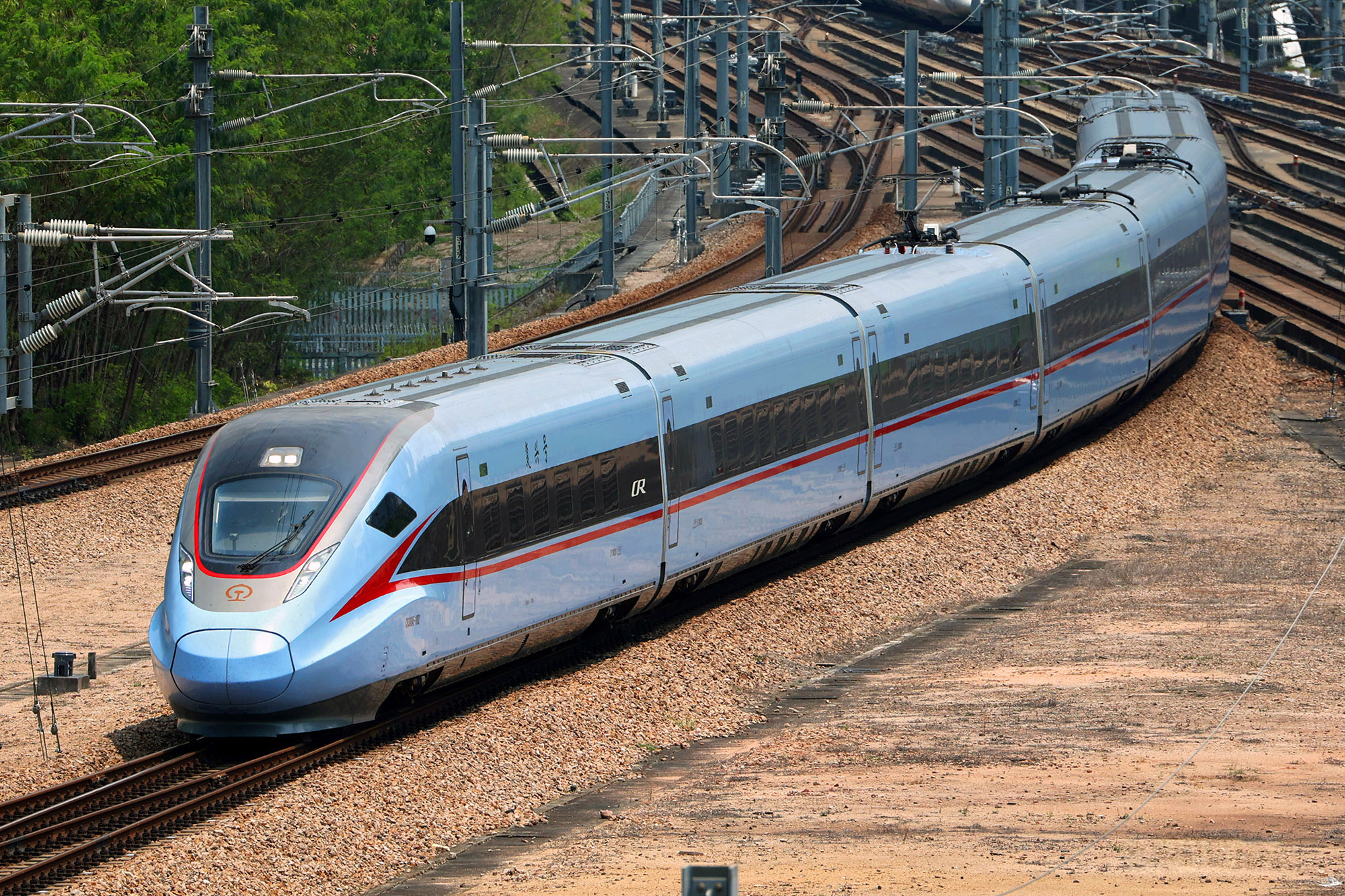
- CR300AF-1012 on service between Guangzhou East railway station and Hong Kong West Kowloon station
- In service: December 25, 2020
- Manufacturers: CRRC Qingdao Sifang; Bombardier Transportation; CRRC Nanjing Puzhen
- Replaced: CRH1, CRH2, CRH5
- Formation: 8 cars (4M4T)
- Capacity: 613 (48 first class / 565 second class); 598 (5 business / 28 first class / 565 second class) for AF-1005~1009
- Operator: China Railway

Specifications
- Train length: approx. 209 m (686 ft)
- Maximum speed: Service: 250 km/h (160 mph); Design: 300 km/h (190 mph)
- Traction system: Water cooling IGBT-VVVF inverter control (Zhuzhou CRRC Times Electric)
- Traction motors: CRRC Zhuzhou Electric squirrel-cage three-phase AC motor|three-phase AC traction motors (4×4 units)
- Electric system: 25 kV 50 Hz AC Overhead catenary
- Current collection: Pantograph
- Bogies: Bolsterless air spring bogies
- Braking systems: Regenerative braking, direct electro-pneumatic braking
- Track gauge: 1,435 mm (4 ft 8 1/2 in) standard gauge

The CR300AF Fuxing (Chinese: 复兴号; pinyin: Fùxīng Hào) is one of the electric multiple unit developed for China Railway High-speed network. It was ordered by China Railway from CRRC Qingdao Sifang.

== Development ==
In early 2018, design reviews for the CR300 series Fuxing Hao EMUs began.

On March 10, 2020, the National Railway Administration also officially approved CRRC Nanjing Puzhen for mass production of the CR300AF type EMU, marking the first time the company obtained qualification to produce high-speed trains.

On November 24, 2020, China Railway Nanning Group announced that 5 CR300AF units arriving by year-end would assist with the 2021 Spring Festival travel season.

On December 25, 2020, the CR300AF began passenger operations, with the inaugural train departing from Kunming South railway station via the Kunming–Chuxiong–Dali railway to Dali railway station.

On April 30, 2021, the CR300AF began operating on the Hainan Ring High-Speed Railway.

== Design ==
=== Carbody ===
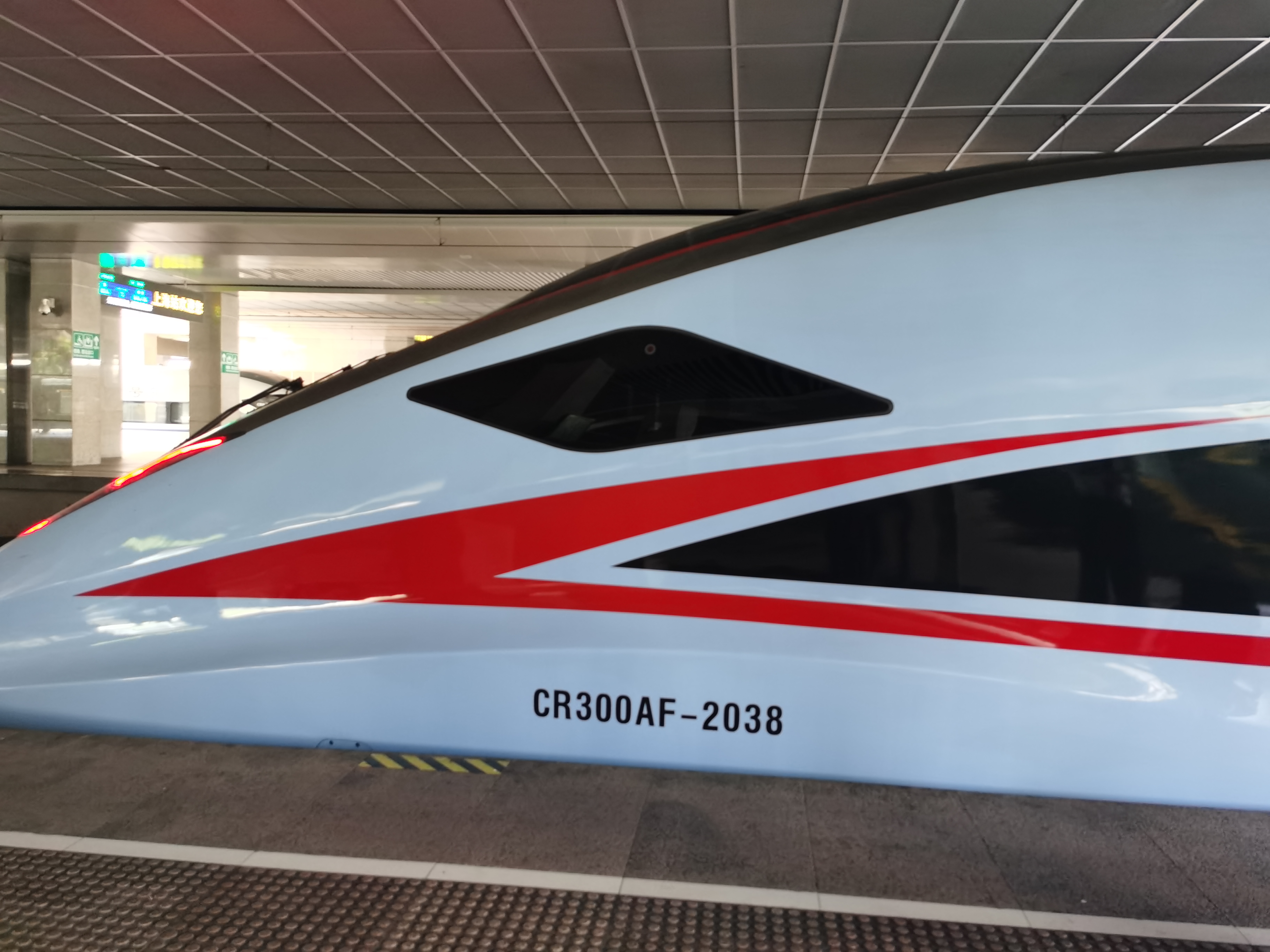
The CR300AF's front end, temporarily featuring a red stripe livery similar to the CR400AF.

The CR300AF features a new front end design, with a shorter nose compared to the CR400AF. As it does not include business class seating, the two auxiliary windows on the front of the CR400AF's driver's cab have been removed, and the side windows have been raised and changed from narrow trapezoidal windows to rhomboid windows.

In terms of livery, the production CR300AF, like the CR300BF, uses sky blue as its base color. Unlike the CR300BF, which is nicknamed "Blue Warm Man", the CR300AF's appearance, resembling a cool and elegant beauty, has earned it the nickname "Blue Sister" among railway enthusiasts.

=== Interior ===
The CR300AF trainset comprises one first-class car and seven second-class cars, with a total capacity of 613 passengers. Compared to the Harmony series EMUs, the seat pitch is more spacious. The entire train is equipped with Wi-Fi antennas, providing wireless internet service, and features accessible restrooms, USB power outlets, large luggage racks, luggage rack indicator lights, and washroom shelves. Compared to the CR400AF, the second-class seat fabric has been changed from beige stripes to blue geometric patterns. The train also includes a seat information display system, indicating seat numbers and reservation status.

Additionally, for the CR300AF Hainan Eastern Ring customized version operating on the Hainan Eastern Ring High-Speed Railway since February 2021, the second-class car capacity remains the same as the production model. However, the first-class car (Car 01) has been converted into a combined first-class/business class car, similar to those on the CR400AF and CR400BF. The capacity of Car 01 has been adjusted from the original 48 seats to 33 seats (5 business class + 28 first class), reducing the total train capacity from 613 to 598 passengers.

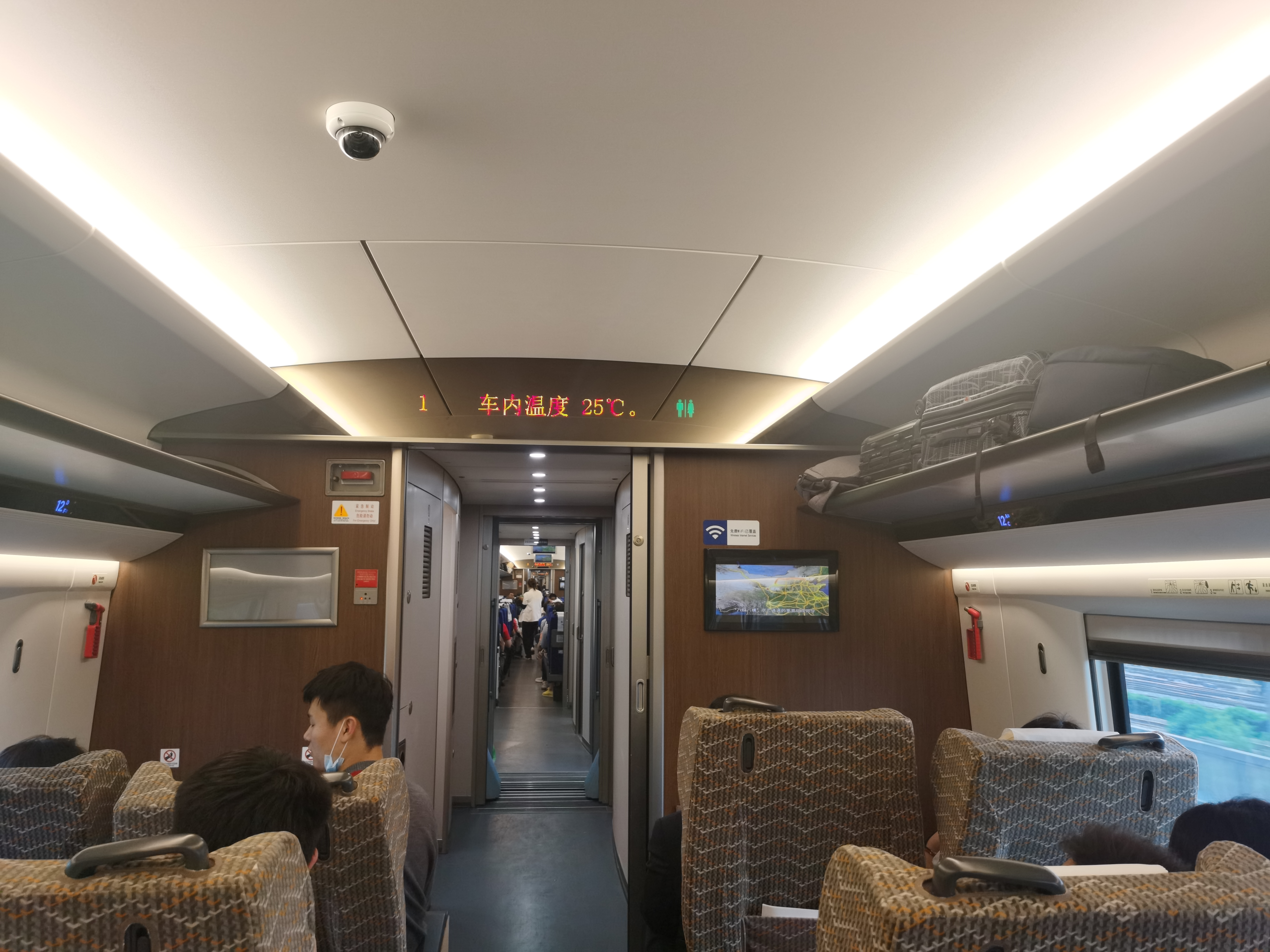
Interior of CR300AF first class

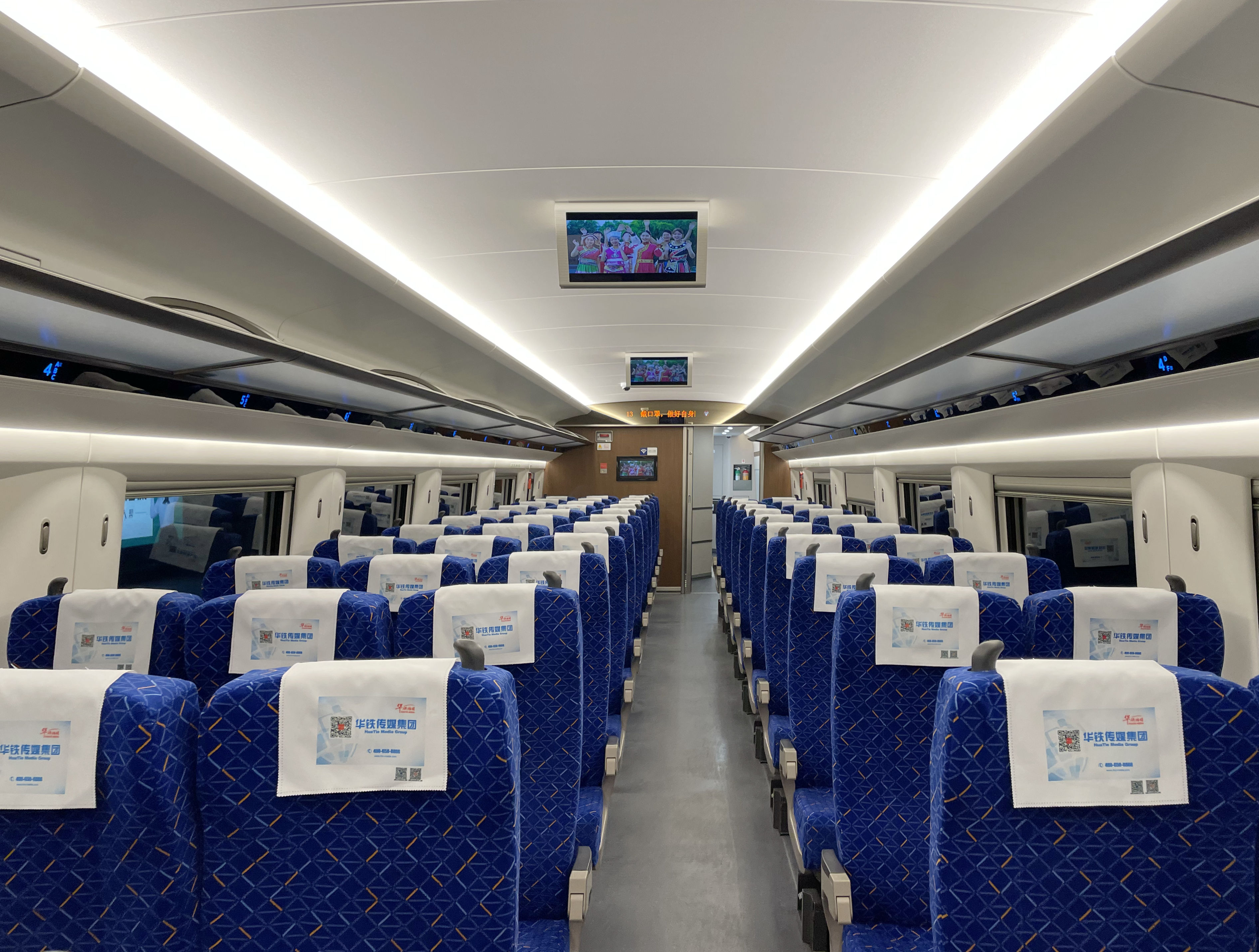
Interior of CR300AF second class

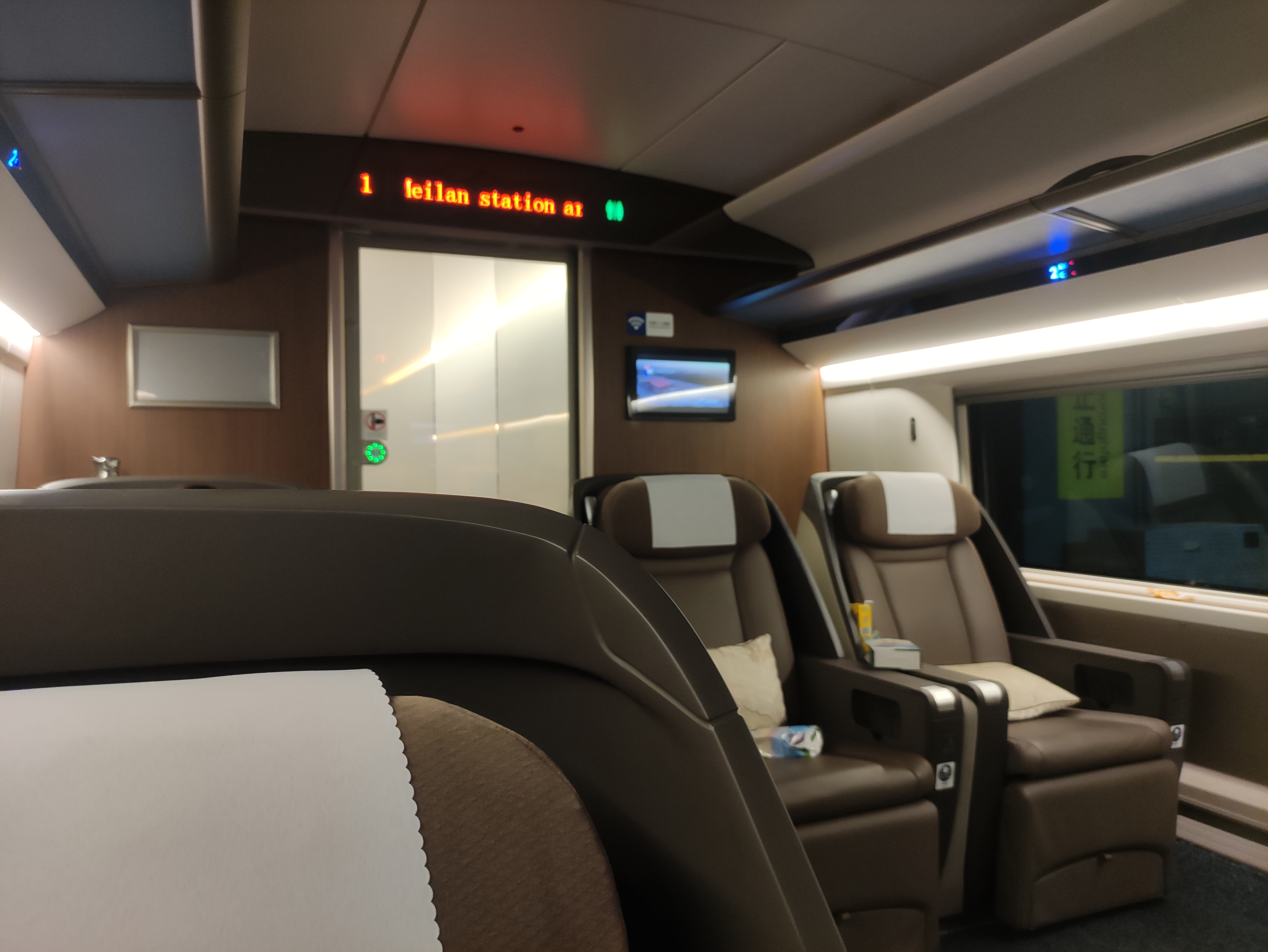
Interior of CR300AF business class

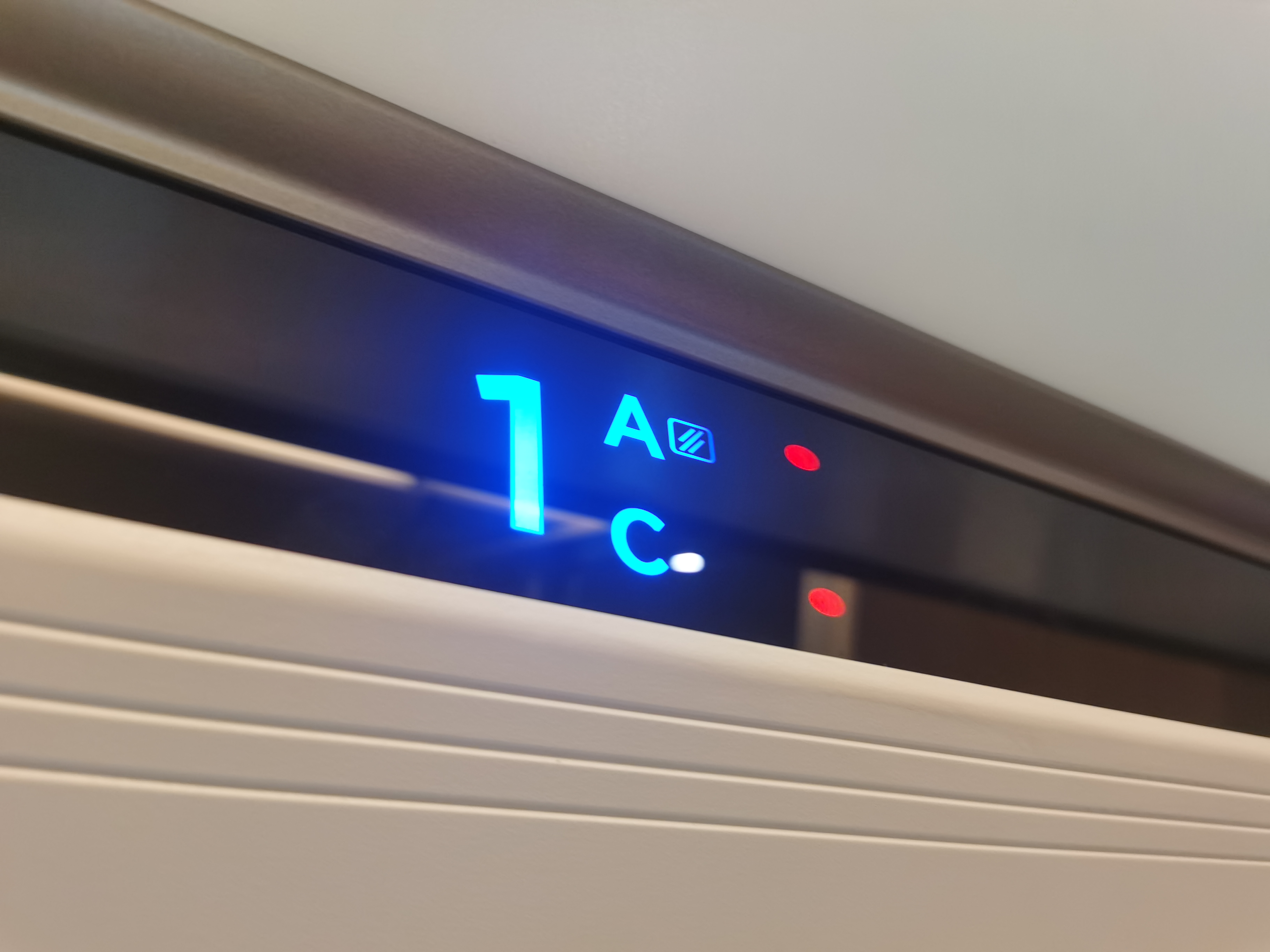
CR300AF seat indicator lights, showing reservation status

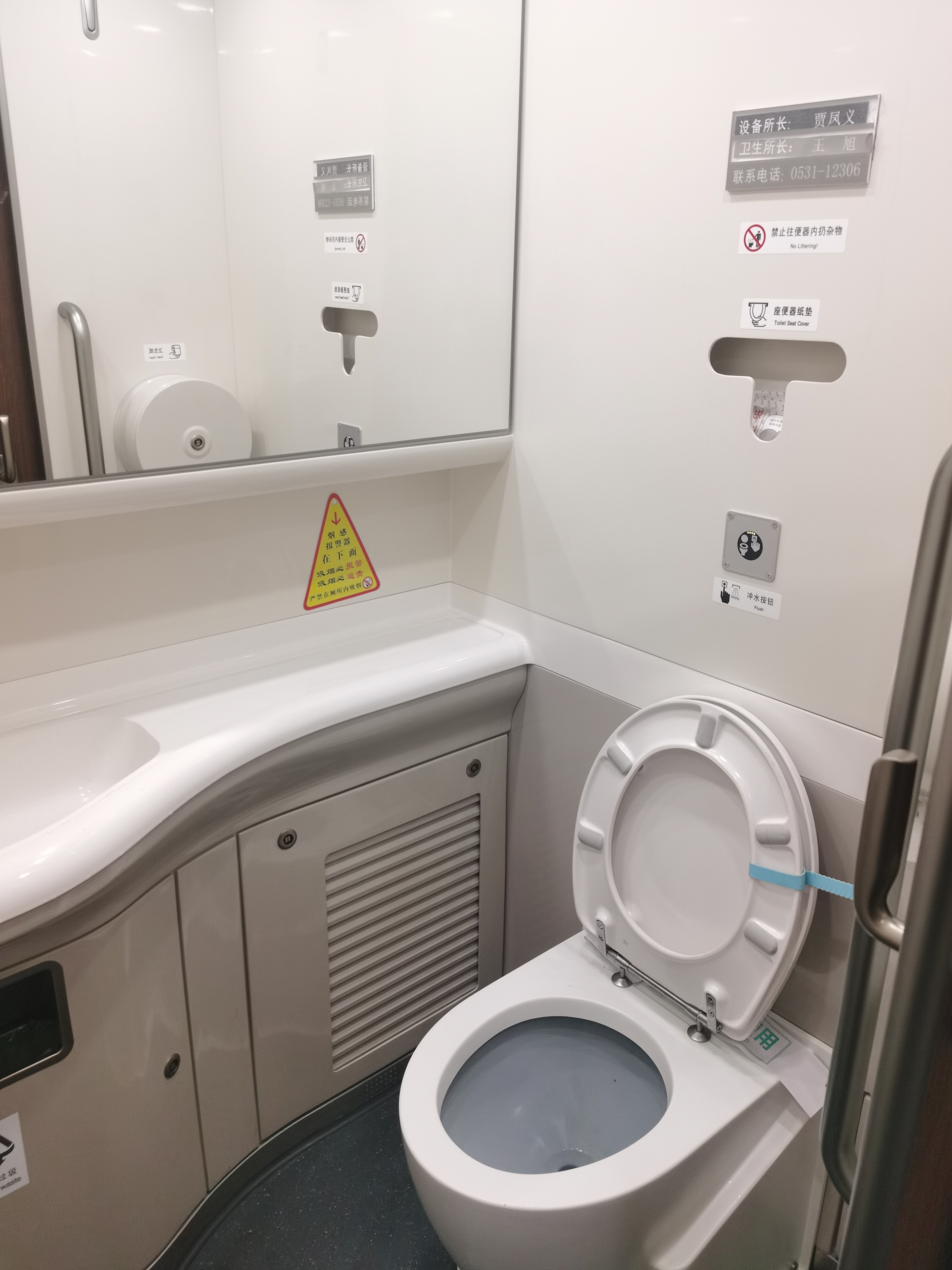
CR300AF restroom

== Incidents ==
- On November 7, 2020, the CR300AF-0004, a leading car, collided with a bus that was waiting at a red light during road transport outside the CRRC Nanjing Puzhen factory. According to an official announcement, at approximately 17:35 on that day, a Line 503 bus from the Nanjing Yangzi Bus Company's Liuhe Automobile Team was traveling northbound in the Purang Residential Area. While the bus was stopped in the rightmost lane at a red light, a semi-trailer carrying the front section of a Fuxing Hao CR300AF EMU, which was approximately 30 meters long, made a left turn from the middle straight lane and struck the bus window, damaging the second side window on the left. As the bus was operating normally at the time of the incident, the semi-trailer carrying the Fuxing Hao was deemed fully responsible, and its driver compensated for the cost of repairing the glass. No injuries were reported at the scene.

== See also ==
- CRH1A-A Harmony EMU
- Fuxing (train)
  - CR400AF
  - CR400BF
  - CR300BF
  - CR200J
