= China Railway CRH5 =

Chinese high-speed train

China Railways CRH5 EMU
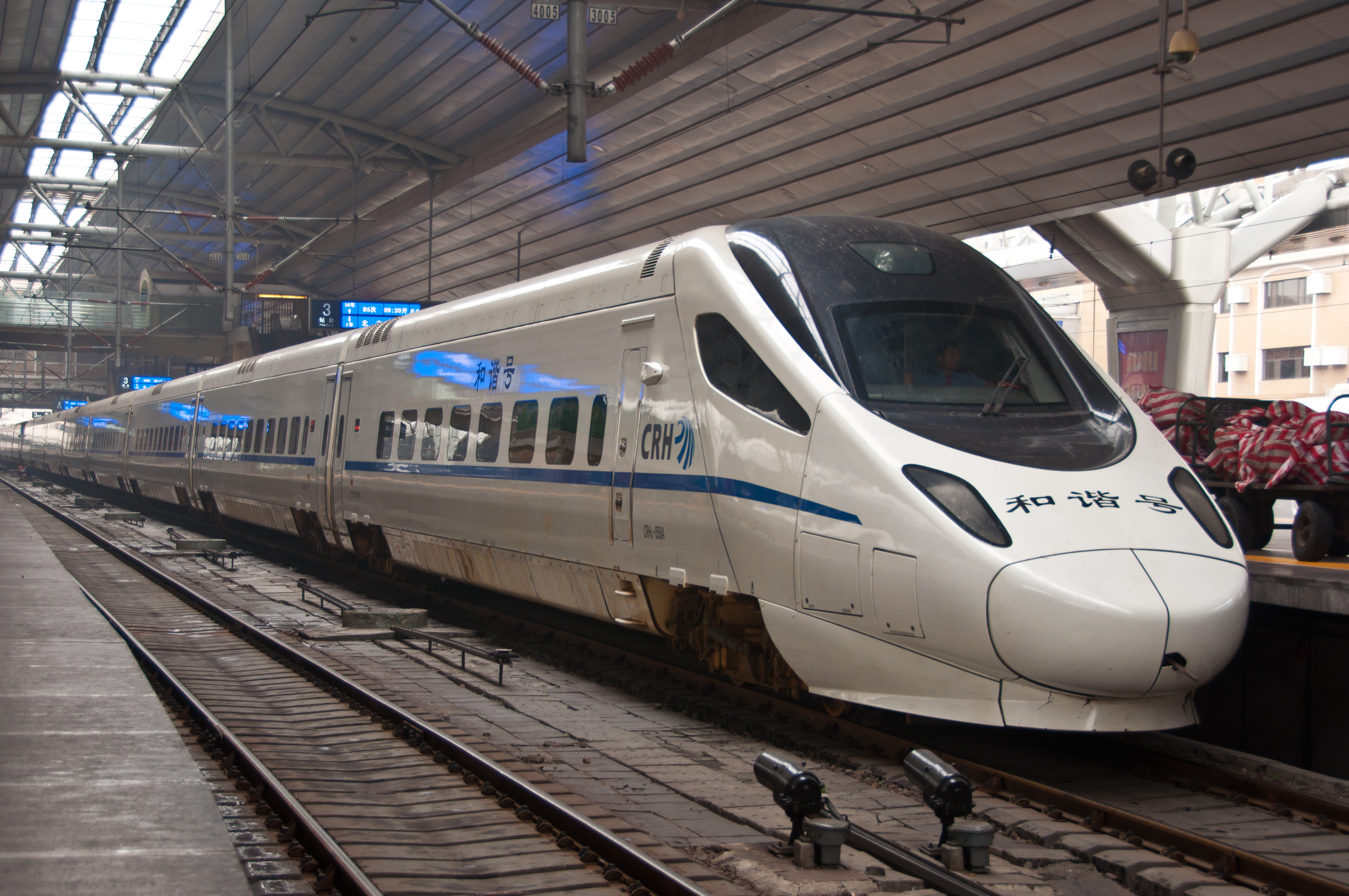
- CRH5A in Beijing railway station
- In service: 2007–present
- Manufacturers: Alstom; Changchun Railway Vehicles Co., Ltd.
- Family name: Pendolino
- Replaced: China Star, DJF3
- Number built: 140 trainsets (1120 cars)
- Successor: CR300AF, CR300BF
- Formation: 8 cars per trainset (5M3T)
- Capacity: Fixed seats: 622; Rolling seats: 586 or 570
- Operators: Chinese Ministry of Railways: Beijing Railway Bureau; Shenyang Railway Bureau; Harbin Railway Bureau; Taiyuan Railway Bureau; Jinan Railway Bureau; Zhengzhou Railway Bureau; Wuhan Railway Bureau; Lanzhou Railway Bureau; Hohhot Railway Bureau; Ürümqi Railway Bureau
- Lines served: High speed and major conventional rail lines in northern China

Specifications
- Train length: 211.5 m (693 ft 11 in)
- Width: 3,200 mm (10 ft 6 in)
- Height: 4,270 mm (14 ft 0 in)
- Platform height: 500–1,250 mm (1 ft 8 in – 4 ft 1 in)
- Maximum speed: 250 km/h (155 mph)
- Weight: 443 t (436 long tons; 488 short tons)
- Traction system: Alstom IGBT VVVF inverter control
- Power output: 5,500 kW (7,376 hp)
- Transmission: AC-DC-AC
- Acceleration: ≥ 0.5 m/s^{2} (1.1 mph/s) (Starter); 0.11 m/s^{2} (0.25 mph/s)(at 200 km/h (124 mph)); 0.05 m/s^{2} (0.11 mph/s)(at 250 km/h (155 mph))
- Electric system: 25 kV 50 Hz AC Overhead
- Current collection: Pantograph
- Braking systems: Regenerative, electronically controlled pneumatic brakes
- Track gauge: 1,435 mm (4 ft 8 1/2 in) standard gauge

The CRH5 Hexie (simplified Chinese: 和谐号; traditional Chinese: 和諧號; pinyin: Héxié Hào; lit. 'Harmony') is an electric multiple unit high-speed train in use with China Railway High-speed in the northern regions of the People's Republic of China. The CRH5 is based on the ETR-600 New Pendolino used in Italy.

The CRH5 are non-tilting trains, developed for the Chinese Railways and whose technology has been transferred to local manufacturers. The CRH5 operate steadily at 250 kilometres per hour (155 mph).

== Variants ==
=== CRH5A ===
In 2004, the Ministry of Railway in China contracted Alstom and CNR Changchun Railway Vehicles to produce 60 sets of the train with a maximum speed of 250 km/h (155 mph). They were ordered around the same time as the Regina-based CRH1A and the Shinkansen-based CRH2A. These trains have been given the designation CRH5A. 30 additional sets were ordered in 2009 and 20 additional sets were ordered in 2010 to complete the current fleet operating on China's northern and eastern lines. On April 26, 2011, the MOR ordered an additional 30 sets.

As to the initial 60 sets, the first three were manufactured by Alstom's factory in Italy, and the next six were delivered in complete knock down form and assembled by CNR Changchun Railway Vehicle. The remaining 51 sets were built by CNR Changchun through technology transfer from Alstom.

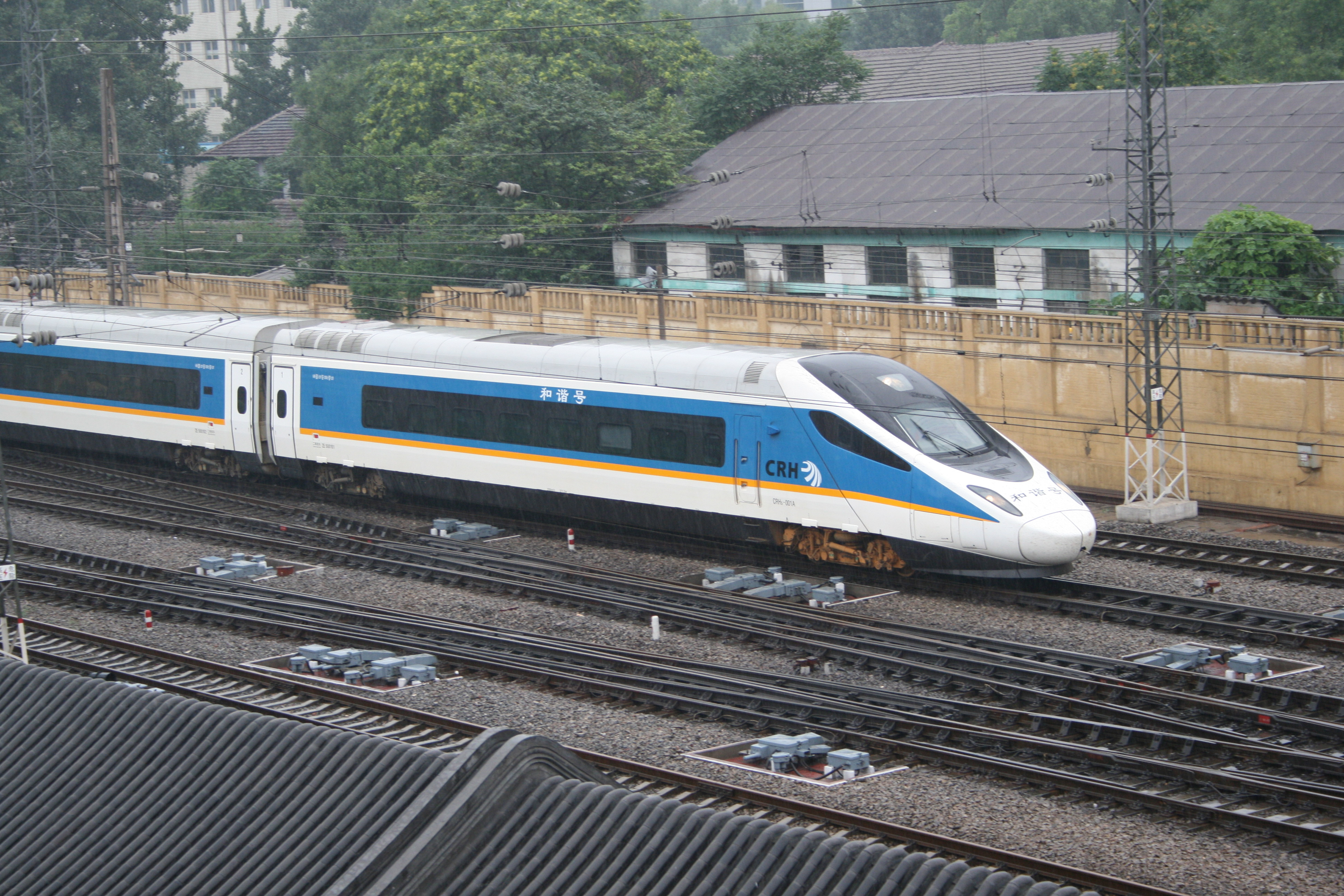
CRH5-001A with old livery

The first train (CRH_{5}-001A) departed from Savigliano port, Italy on December 11, 2006 and arrive at Dalian port on January 28, 2007. The first CRH5A set made by CNR Changchun (CRH_{5}-010A) was delivered in April, 2007.

The CRH5A sets started service from April 18, 2007, the date of the sixth national railway speed-up at the Beijing-Harbin Railway. In the following years, it opened service at the Jinan-Qingdao high-speed rail and Shijiazhuang-Taiyuan high-speed rail.

Each of the CRH5A set consists of eight cars. The initial 12 sets (CRH_{5}-001A ～ CRH_{5}-012A) have one first-class seating car (ZY), six second-class seating cars (ZE), and one second-class seating/dining car (ZEC). The subsequent sets have two first-class seating cars (ZY) and six second-class seating cars (ZE).

The CRH5A trains experienced a number of failures in early stages. The failures were attributed to new technologies introduced on CRH5A and a relatively short trial run before the first delivery

=== CRH5E ===
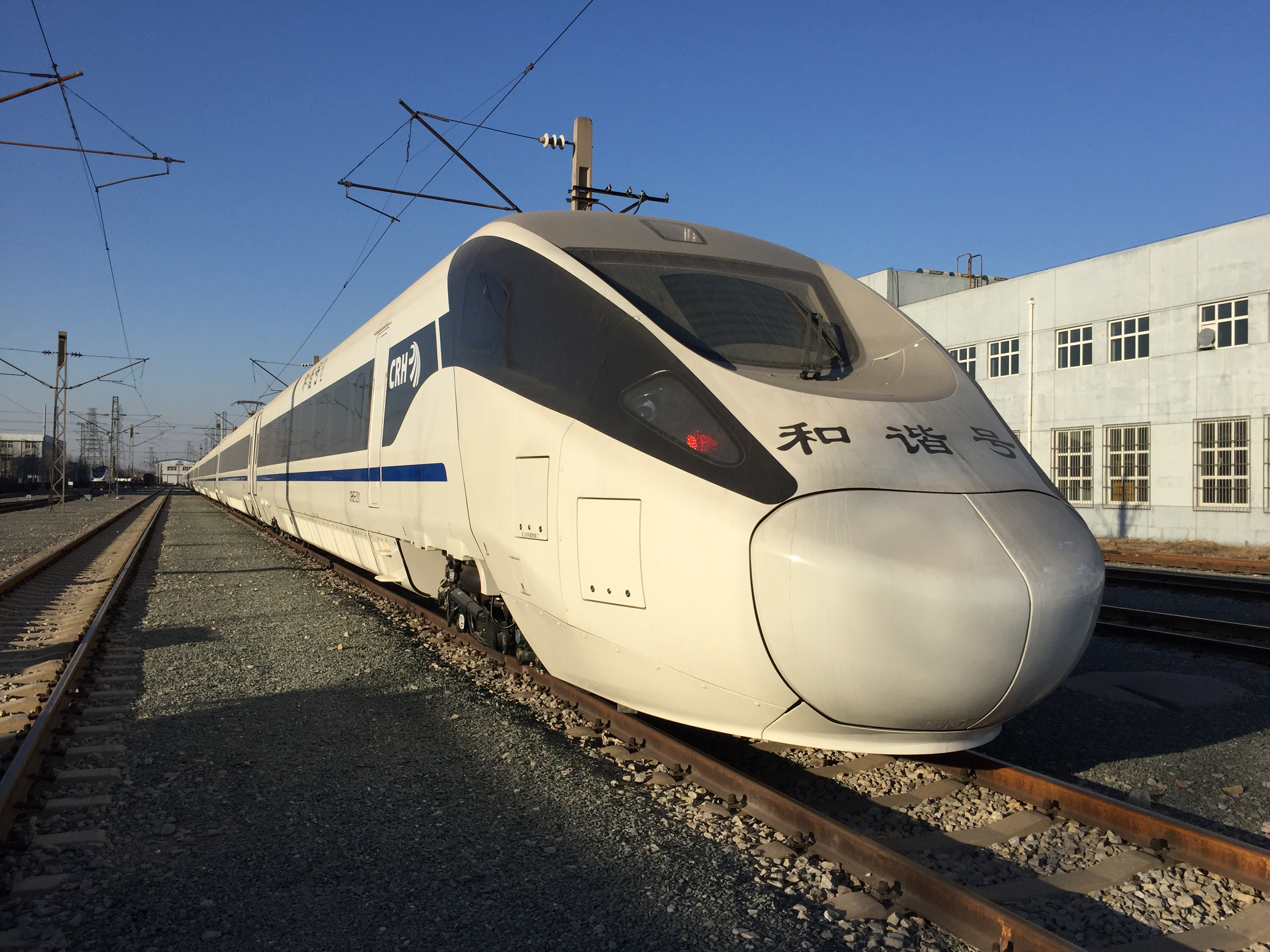
CRH5E

CRH5E are cold resistant high speed sleeper trains outfitted with traditional railway sleeping berths (couchette car).

=== CRH5G/H ===
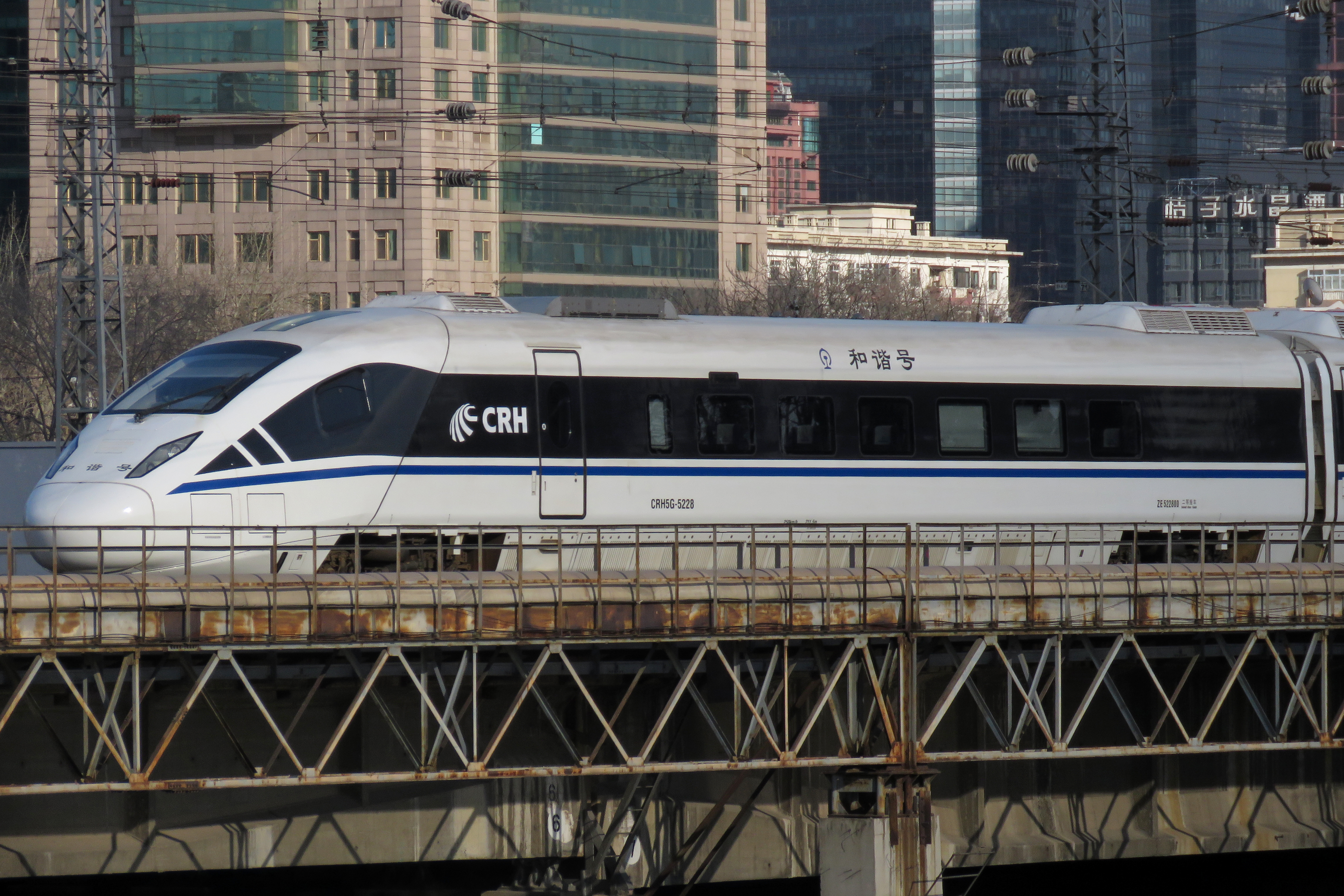
CRH5G

CRH5G is a specialized cold and sand/windstorm resistant version of the CRH5 for use on the Baoji–Lanzhou high-speed railway manufactured by CRRC Changchun Railway Vehicles.

== CIT001 ==
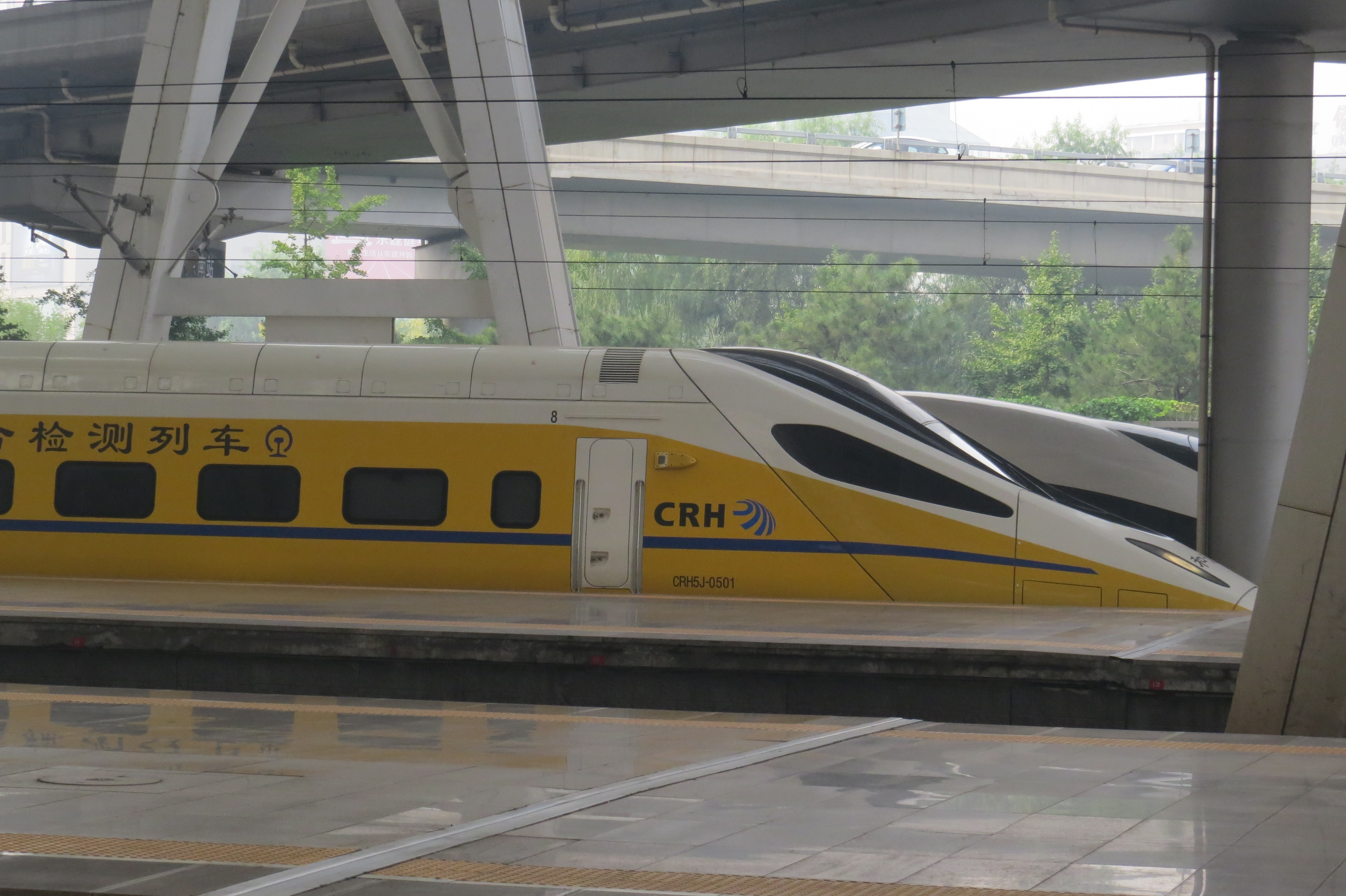
The CRH5J-0501 (CIT001) train at Beijing South railway station

On April 2, 2007, China Academy of Railway Sciences ordered a CRH5-based high-speed test train; the official name of this train set is Code Zero Comprehensive Testing Train, name code CIT001. This train is equipped with special devices to monitor the condition of the track, wheel-rail force, overhead wire, communication system and signal system. The train is painted with yellow and white color and started test run on July 1, 2007.

== Formation ==
Power Destination

- M – Motor car
- T – Trailer car
- C – Driver cabin
- P – Pantograph

Coach Type

- ZY – First Class Coach
- ZE – Second Class Coach
- ZEC – Second Class Coach／Buffet Car
- WR – Soft Sleeper Coach
- WRC – Soft Sleeper Coach／Buffet Car

CRH5A / CRH5G

Coach No.	1	2	3	4	5	6	7	8
Type^{1}	ZE					ZEC	ZE	ZY
Type^{2}	ZY	ZE				ZEC	ZE	ZY
Type^{3}	ZY	ZE			ZEC	ZE		
Power Configuration	MC	M	TP	M	T	TP	M	MC
Power Units	Unit 1				Unit 2			
Capacity^{1}	74	93				42	74	60
Capacity^{2}	56	90				40	74	56
Capacity^{3}	48	90		77	63	90		65

- ^1 Train No. CRH5A-5001 to CRH5A-5012 and CRH5A-5043 to CRH5A-5053
- ^2 Train No. CRH5A-5013 to CRH5A-5042, CRH5A-5054 to CRH5A-5140
- ^3 Train No. CRH5G-5141～5200, 5206～5229

CRH5E

Coach No.	1	2	3	4	5	6	7	8	9	10	11	12	13	14	15	16
Type	ZE	WR							WRC	WR						ZE
Power Configuration	Mc	M	Tp	M	T	Tp	M				Tp	T	M	Tp	M	Mc
Power Units	Unit 1				Unit 2				Unit 3				Unit 4			
Capacity	55	40							12	40						55

- Train No. CRH5E-5201 and CRH5E-5202

== Distribution ==
As of September 2017, a total of 227 sets of CRH5 series trains have left the factory, one of which is the No. 0 high-speed comprehensive inspection train.

Operator	Quantity	Serial number	Depot	Notes
CRH5A
CR Beijing	13	5018, 5021, 5029, 5036-5037, 5042, 5073, 5079, 5103, 5116-5117, 5134-5135	Beijing	
CR Beijing	8	5057, 5061, 5063, 5074, 5077, 5115, 5119, 5120	Shijiazhuang	
CR Beijing	5	5028, 5076, 5118, 5121, 5136	Caozhuang	
CR Wuhan	17	5078, 5091, 5096-5097, 5100-5101, 5104-5110, 5123-5127, 5133	Hankou	
CR Shenyang	19	5015-5016, 5024-5026, 5035, 5038-5039, 5082, 5089, 5092-5094, 5102, 5111, 5113-5114, 5137-5139	Shenyang North	
CR Shenyang	5	5014, 5017, 5081, 5088, 5112	Tongliao	
CR Shenyang	9	5001-5008, 5010	Dalian	
CR Harbin	26	5019-5020, 5022-5023, 5030, 5033, 5041, 5043, 5056, 5062, 5064-5065, 5067-5072, 5090, 5099, 5128-5132, 5140	Harbin West	
CR Taiyuan	19	5027, 5031-5032, 5034, 5040, 5058-5060, 5066, 5075, 5080, 5083-5087, 5095, 5098, 5122	Taiyuan	
CR Hohhot	16	5009, 5011-5013, 5044-5055	Hohhot	
CRH5G
CR Ürümqi	12	5183-5185, 5195-5198, 5200, 5206-5207, 5212, 5214	Ürümqi	
CR Lanzhou	24	5147, 5152, 5178, 5191-5194, 5199, 5208, 5210, 5215-5216, 5218-5229	Lanzhou West	5218~5229 is enhanced CRH5G
CR Lanzhou	6	5148, 5151, 5199, 5209, 5213, 5217	Yinchuan	
CR Qingzang	7	5175-5176, 5179-5182, 5211	Xining	
CR Harbin	12	5143-5146, 5153-5156, 5158-5159, 5186-5187	Harbin West	
CR Shenyang	23	5141-5142, 5149-5150, 5157, 5160-5174, 5188-5190	Changchun	
CRH5E
CR Ürümqi	2	5201, 5202	Ürümqi	The sleeper EMU was shipped to Shenyang Huanggutun EMU on February 15, 2016 after trials at the China Railway Test Center and then idled. Starting from January 27, 2019, it will serve as the Beijing-Qingdao North D335/336 train. Now it is assigned to the Urumqi station and serves as a daytime sleeper train.
CRH5J (original name: CIT001)
China Railway	1	0501	—N/a	No. 0 high-speed comprehensive inspection train (body color is yellow)

== See also ==
- China Railway CRH3A
- China Railway CJ1
- China Railway CR300BF
- China Railway CIT trains
- List of high-speed trains
- New Pendolino
- Avant class 114
- Pendolino
