= China Railway CR220J =

2023 Chinese electric high speed train

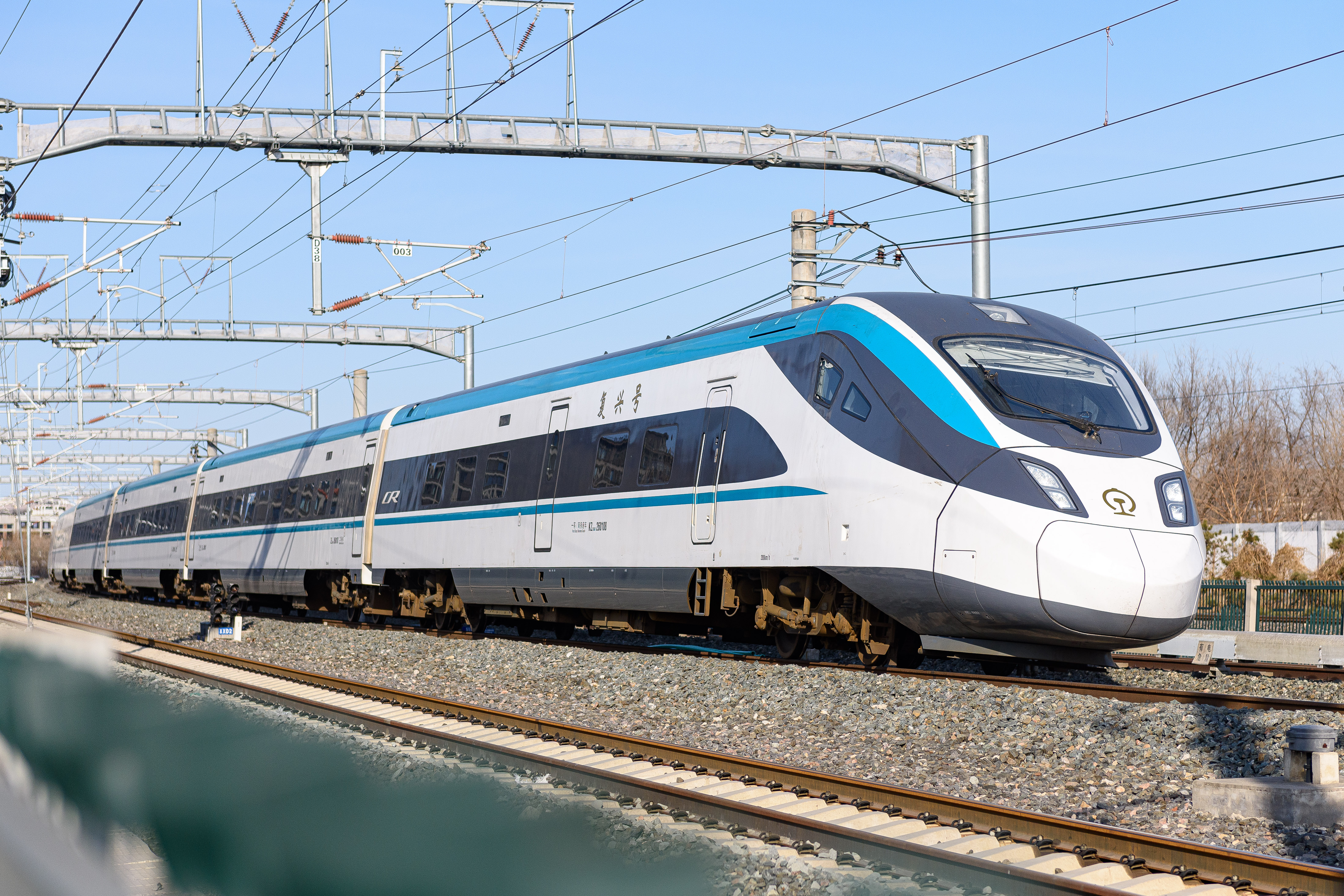
- Stock type: Electric multiple unit
- Family name: Fuxing
- Constructed: 2023-
- Number built: 2
- Number in service: 0
- Predecessor: China Railway CR200J
- Formation: 1M8T
- Capacity: 672

Specifications
- Width: 3.36 metres (11.0 ft)
- Height: 4.18 metres (13.7 ft)
- Maximum speed: Service: 200 km/h (120 mph); Design: 220 km/h (140 mph)
- Electric system: 25kV 50Hz AC
- Current collection: Pantograph
- UIC classification: (Co'Co')(2'2')(2'2')(2'2')(2'2')(2'2')(2'2')(2'2')(2'2')
- Bogies: SW-220G
- Minimum turning radius: 150m
- Safety system: CTCS2-200, LKJ2000, Vigilance
- Coupling system: Scharfenberg
- Headlight type: Light Emitting Diode
- Track gauge: 1,435 mm (4 ft 8 1/2 in)

The CR220J Fuxing (Chinese: 复兴号; pinyin: Fùxīng Hào) is a prototype Chinese electric multiple unit developed and manufactured by multiple CRRC subsidiaries. As part of the China Standardized EMU family, the CR220J has an operating speed of 200 km/h (124 mph).

== Development ==
=== 2023 ===
The CR220J finished design phase and entered manufacturing process in middle 2023.

=== 2024 ===
In March, the first power car entered testing process.

On April 20, first FXD1D-J rolled out at CRRC ZELC factory in Zhuzhou, Hunan and travelled to Nanjing, Jiangsu for further testing with the trailers.

On April 29, first FXD3D-J (FXD3D-J0001) rolled out at CRRC Dalian factory in Dalian, Liaoning and travelled to Tangshan, Hebei for further testing with the trailers.

On May 18, first whole set of CR220J1 (CR220J1-2601), combined with one FXD1D power car and 8 20AB trailers travelled from Nanjing to China Academy of Railway Sciences (CARS) testing site in Beijing. At the mean time, the first whole set of CR220J3 (CR220J3-1601) also arrived at the CARS test center in Beijing from Tangshan.

On August 4, the CR220J1 and CR220J3 leaved CARS test center in Beijing and headed to Chengdu, Sichuan for testing on conventional lines.

On August 8 and 9, they arrived in Chengdu and started testing on Chengdu-Chongqing railway (Chengdu-Zizhong section) and Chengdu-Kunming railway (Shuangliu-Ganluo south section).

== Design ==
The CR220J is a further development of the successful CR200J platform. Unlike other electric multiple units in the China railway fleet, the CR220J uses similar technology like the German ICE 1, ICE 2 and French TGV, which concentrates traction units into single or double power heads in combination with unpowered carriages as a train set instead of separating the power source all across the set.

=== Power car ===
The power car of CR220J is designated as FXD1D-J and FXD3D-J, which are developed based on the "Fuxing" electric locomotive platform. Each power car has a traction power of 7200 kW, which is 28.5% more than the previous generation FXD1 platform that can be seen on CR200J. FXD1D and FXD3D are believed to be packed with structures and technologies from six-axle HXD1D and HXD3D electric locomotives with localized components that are manufactured in China.

=== Trailer car ===
The trailer cars are designated as 20AA and 20AB, 20AA is manufactured by CRRC Tangshan and 20AB by CRRC Nanjing Puzhen. They are the further development of the trailers cars on the CR200J, which can be traced back to the imported Bombardier carriages. Redesigned SW-220G bogies are deployed on these carriages for more stability under higher speeds.

== Variant ==
=== CR220J1 Prototype ===
The power car is designated as FXD1D, manufactured by CRRC Zhuzhou Locomotive with a power of 7200 kW.

Trailers are designated as 20AB, manufactured by CRRC Nanjing Puzhen.

Coach sequence of CR220J1
| No. | Model | Type | Function | | Seating | Length |
|---|---|---|---|---|---|---|
| 0 | FXD1D-J | - | Power car | - | - | |
| 1 | 20AB | ZE | Trailer car | 95 | Second | 25.5m |
| 2 | 20AB | ZE | Trailer car | 95 | Second | 25.5m |
| 3 | 20AB | ZE | Trailer car | 95 | Second | 25.5m |
| 4 | 20AB | ZEC | Trailer car | 72 | Second/Restaurant | 25.5m |
| 5 | 20AB | ZE | Trailer car | 95 | Second | 25.5m |
| 6 | 20AB | ZE | Trailer car | 95 | Second | 25.5m |
| 7 | 20AB | ZE | Trailer car | 95 | Second | 25.5m |
| 8 | 20AB | ZYS | Control/Trailer car | 30 | Business/First | 28.4m |

=== CR220J3 Prototype ===
The power car is designated as FXD3D, manufactured by CRRC Dalian with a power of 7200 kW.

Trailers are designated as 20AA, manufactured by CRRC Tangshan.

Coach sequence of CR220J3
| No. | Model | Type | Function | | Seating | Length |
|---|---|---|---|---|---|---|
| 0 | FXD3D-J | - | Power car | - | - | |
| 1 | 20AA | ZE | Trailer car | 95 | Second | 25.5m |
| 2 | 20AA | ZE | Trailer car | 95 | Second | 25.5m |
| 3 | 20AA | ZE | Trailer car | 95 | Second | 25.5m |
| 4 | 20AA | ZEC | Trailer car | 72 | Second/Restaurant | 25.5m |
| 5 | 20AA | ZE | Trailer car | 95 | Second | 25.5m |
| 6 | 20AA | ZE | Trailer car | 95 | Second | 25.5m |
| 7 | 20AA | ZE | Trailer car | 95 | Second | 25.5m |
| 8 | 20AA | ZYS | Control/Trailer car | 30 | Business/First | 28.4m |

== See also ==
- Rail transport in China
- Fuxing (train)
- China Railway
- China Railway CR200J
