= Rail transport in China =

China

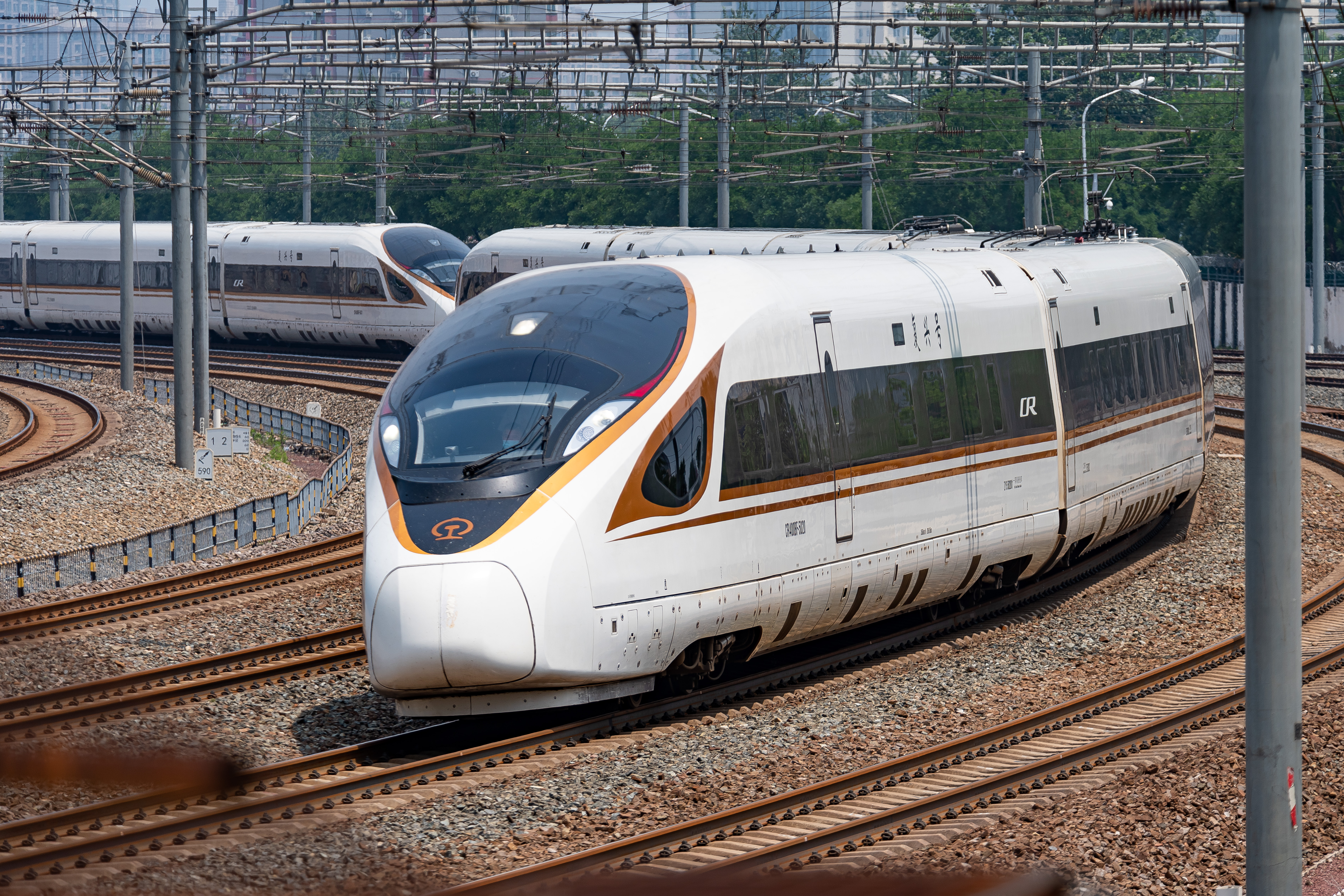
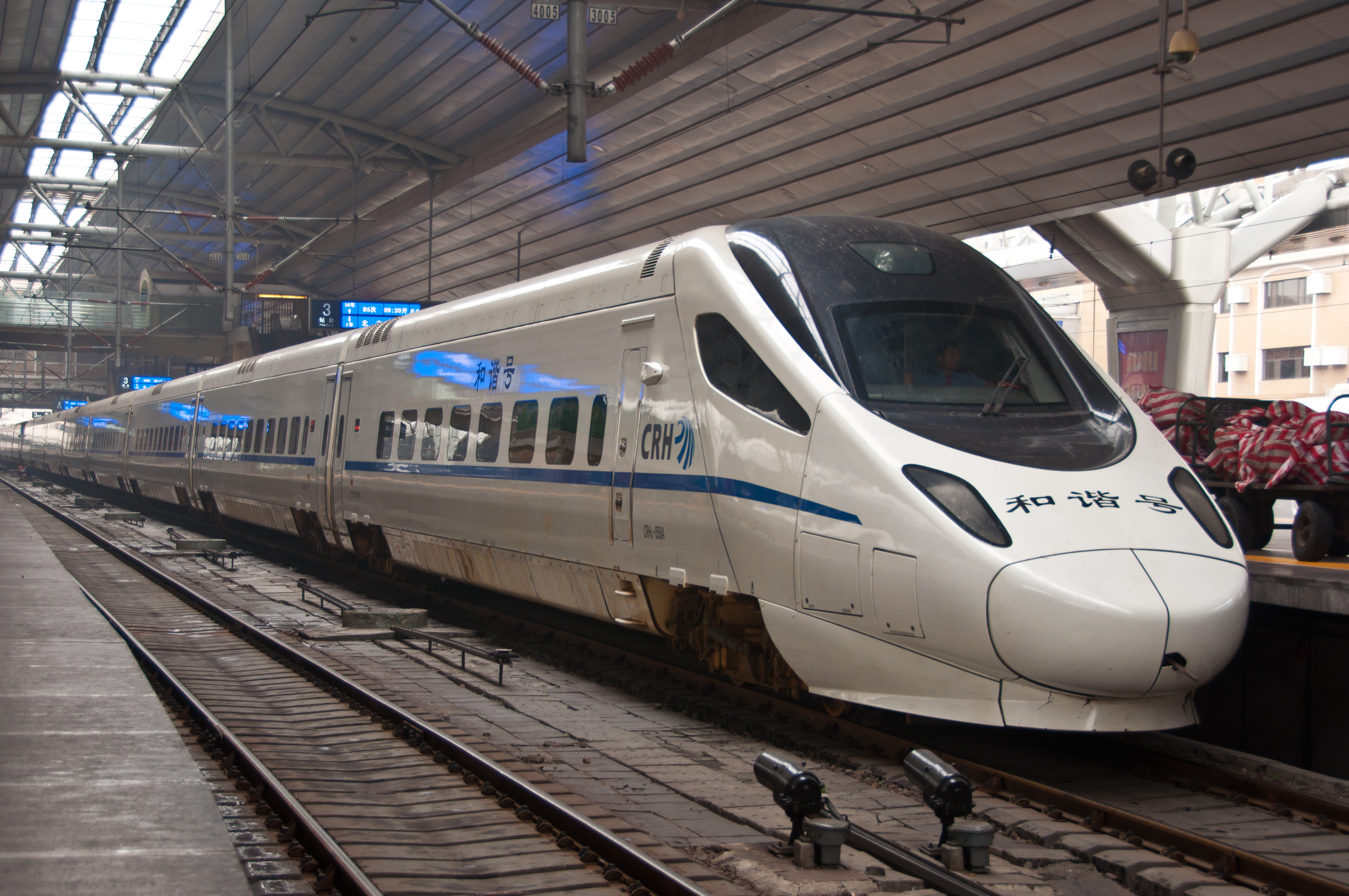
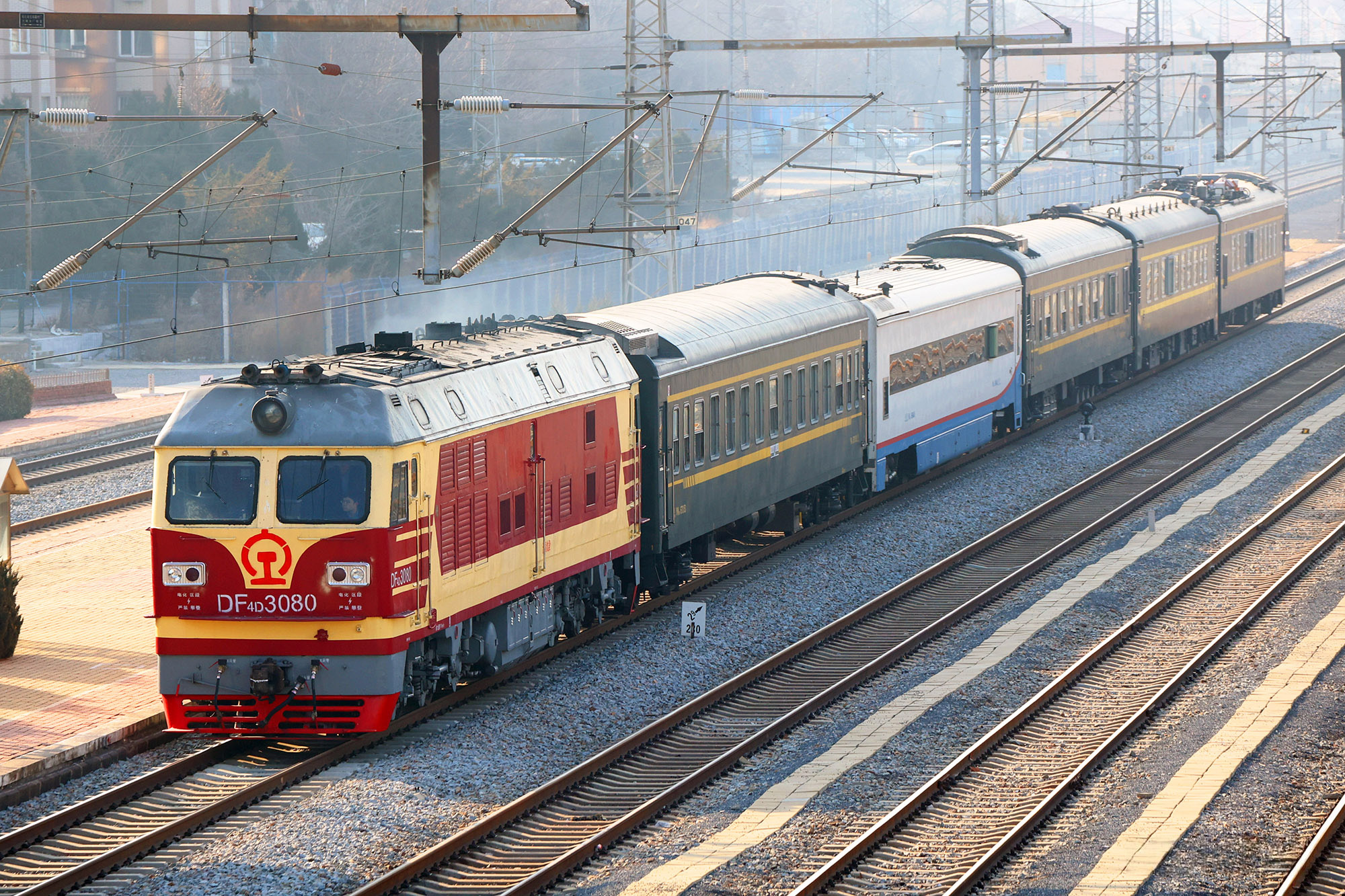
- Clockwise from top left: A CR400BF Fuxing Hao trainset; a CRH5 Hexie (Harmony) trainset; a DF4D diesel locomotive and a HXD1C electric locomotive

Operation
- National railway: China State Railway Group Company, Limited
- Infrastructure company: China Railway and joint-venture railway companies with LGFV
- Major operators: CR’s regional railway group companies; Local Railways like Shenhua Group

Statistics
- Ridership: 4.310 billion passenger trips (2024)
- Passenger-distance: 206 billion (2024)
- Freight: 4.389 billion tonnes (2024)

System length
- Total: 162,000 km (101,000 mi) (2024)^{[a]}
- Double track: 95,000km (2023)
- Electrified: 119,000km (2023)
- High-speed: 50,000 km (31,000 mi) (2026)

Track gauge
- Main: 1,435 mm (4 ft 8 1/2 in)
- High-speed: 1,435 mm (4 ft 8 1/2 in)
- 1,435 mm (4 ft 8 1/2 in) standard gauge: 79,685 kilometres (49,514 mi) (1998)
- 1,000 mm (3 ft 3 3/8 in) metre gauge: 466 kilometres (290 mi)
- 750 mm (2 ft 5 1/2 in): 3,600 kilometres (2,200 mi) (1998 est.)

Features
- No. of tunnels: 16,084 (2019)
- Tunnel length: 18,041 kilometres (11,210 mi) (2019)
- Longest tunnel: Songshanhu Tunnel; 38.813 kilometres (24.117 mi)
- No. of bridges: 47,524 (2008)
- Longest bridge: Danyang–Kunshan Grand Bridge; 164.8 kilometres (102.4 mi)
- No. of stations: 5,470 (2008)
- Max elevation: 5,072 metres (16,640 ft) at Tanggula Pass
Map

Rail transport is an important mode of long-distance transportation in China. As of 2024, the country had more than 159,000 km (98,798 mi)^{[a]} of railways, the 2nd longest network in the world. China had more than 50,000 kilometres (31,069 miles) of high-speed rail (HSR), the longest HSR network in the world.

The railway sector in China is essentially operated by the central government. Almost all rail operations are handled by the China State Railway Group Company, Limited, a state-owned company created in March 2013 (as China Railway Corporation) after the dissolution of the Ministry of Railways and was converted into a joint-stock company and placed under the control of the Ministry of Finance in June 2019.

Operationally it is divided between the conventional network which is mixed use handling both freight and passenger service and the high speed network.

China's railways are the busiest in the world. In 2019, railways in China delivered 3.660 billion passenger trips, generating 1,470.66 billion passenger-kilometres and carried 4.389 billion tonnes of freight, generating 3,018 billion cargo tonne-kilometres. Freight traffic turnover has increased more than fivefold over the period 1980–2013 and passenger traffic turnover has increased more than sevenfold over the same period. During the five years 2016–2020, China's railway network handled 14.9 billion passenger trips, 9 billion of which were completed by bullet trains, the remaining 5.9 billion by conventional rail. The three figures surged 41 percent (from 10.6 to 14.9 billion), 152 percent (from 3.6 to 9 billion) and decreased 16 percent (from 7 to 5.9 billion) from those during the 12th Five-Year Plan period, respectively.

Driven by need to increase freight capacity, the railway network has expanded with the country budgeting $130.4 billion for railway investment in 2014, and has a long-term plan to expand the network to 274,000 km (170,000 mi) by 2050. China built 9,000 km of new railway in 2015.

== History ==
=== Qing dynasty (1876–1911) ===
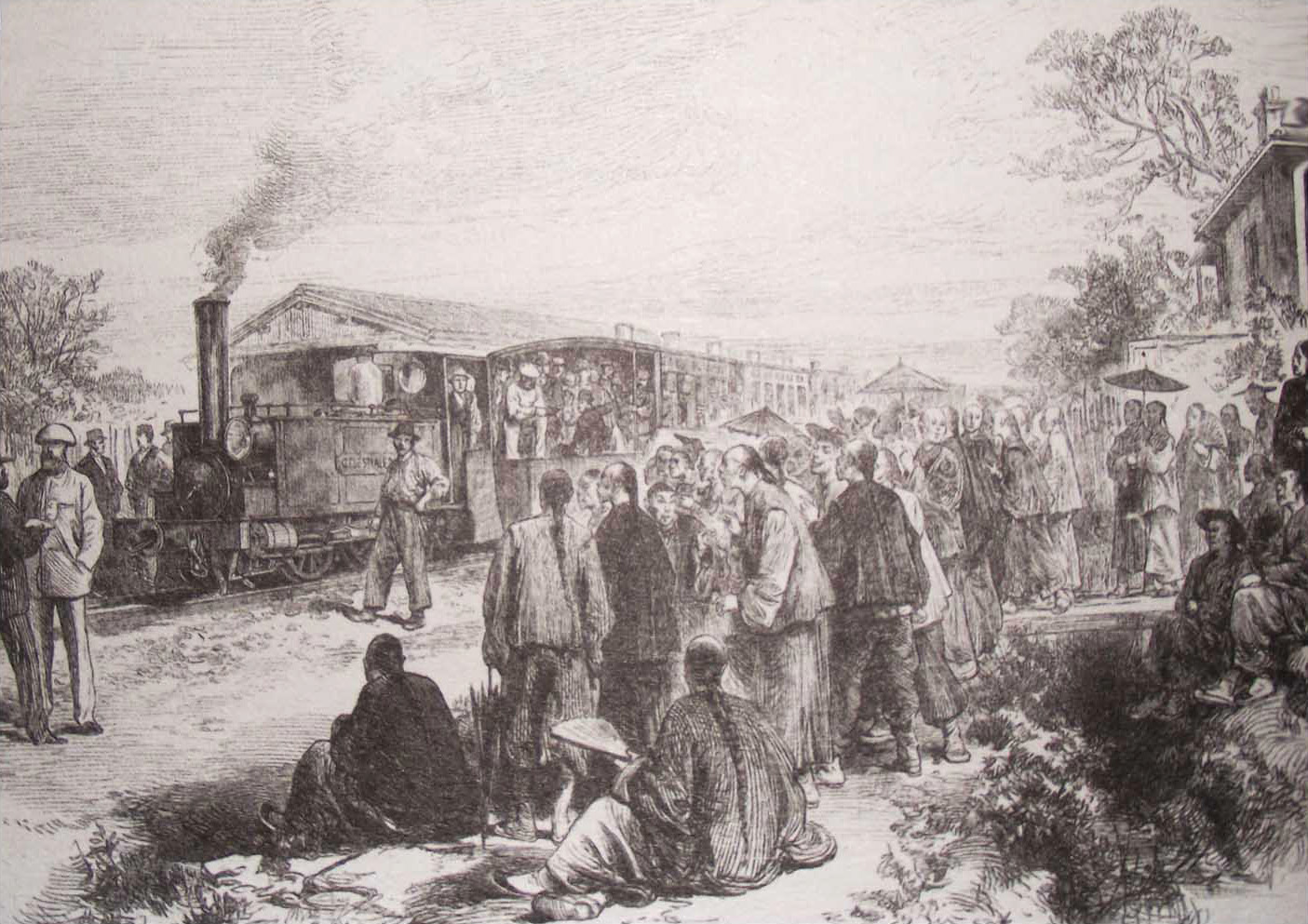
The opening of the short-lived Woosung Road, the first railway in China, between Shanghai and Wusong in 1876.

The first recorded railway track to be laid in China was a 600-metre (1,969 ft) long miniature gauge demonstration line that a British merchant assembled outside the Xuanwumen city gate at Beijing in 1865 to demonstrate rail technology. The Qing government was uninterested and had the line dismantled. The first railroad to enter commercial service was the Woosung railway, a 14.5 km railway from Shanghai to Woosung (modern Shanghai's Baoshan District) which opened in 1876. It was built with investment from Jardine Matheson. In October 1876, the Qing bought the railway and demolished it the next year for a number of reasons (including that there had been a fatality on the track).

Until the defeat of China in the First Sino-Japanese War, the government remained hostile toward railway construction. Beginning in 1895, the government began to grant rail concessions to foreigners, and permitted direct connection to the capital Beijing.

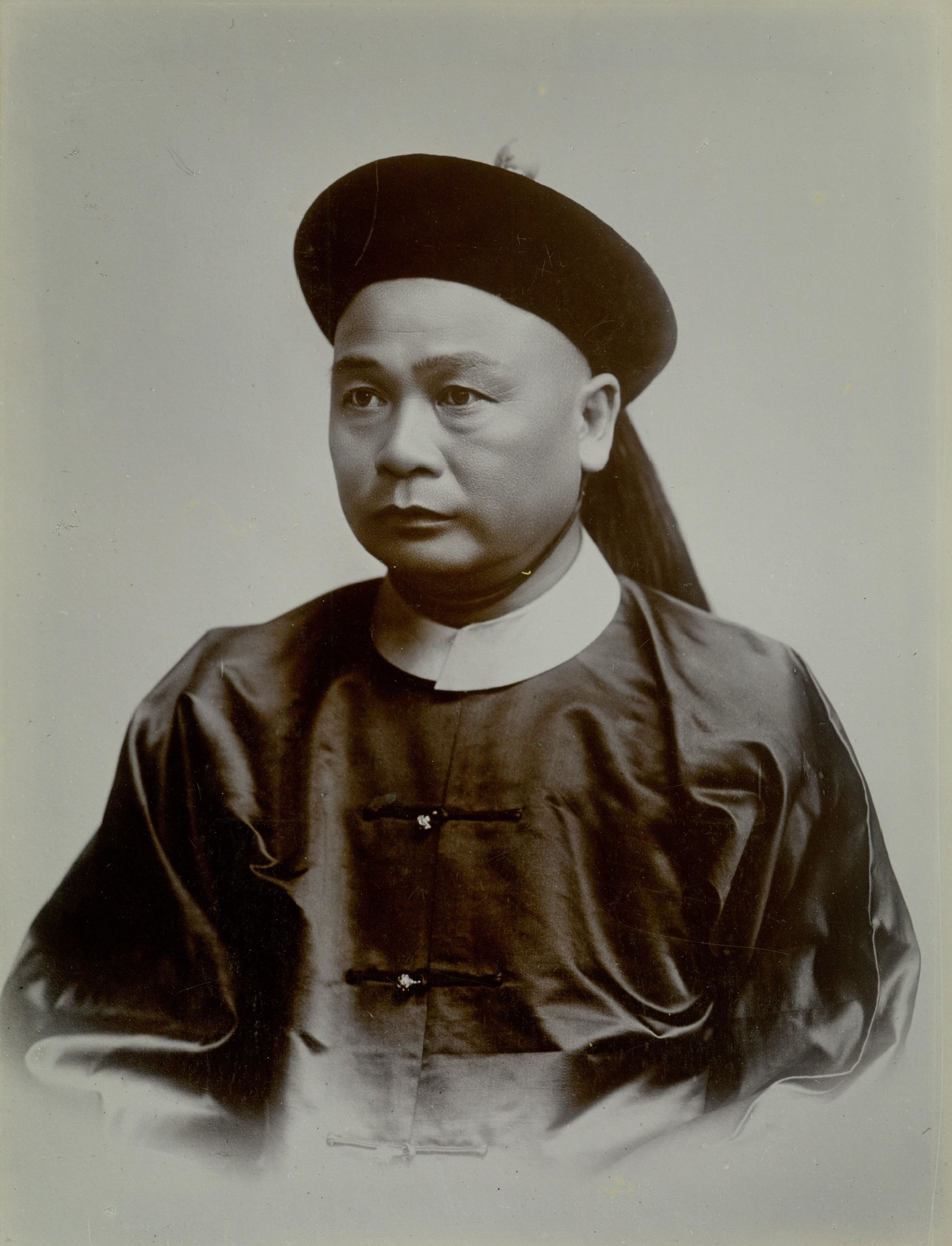
Zhan Tianyou, the "father of China's railways"

By 1911, there were about 9,000 km (5,592 mi) of railroads in China, mostly designed, built, owned and operated by foreign companies. This was still well behind the industrialized world, the United States had roughly 380,000 km (236,121 mi) of rail at the time. The first indigenous-designed and -constructed railway by Chinese was the Beijing-Zhangjiakou Railway built from 1905 to 1909, a difficult job due to the mountainous terrain. The chief engineer of this railway was Zhan Tianyou, who is known as the Father of China's Railway.

=== Republic of China in mainland period (1912–1949) ===
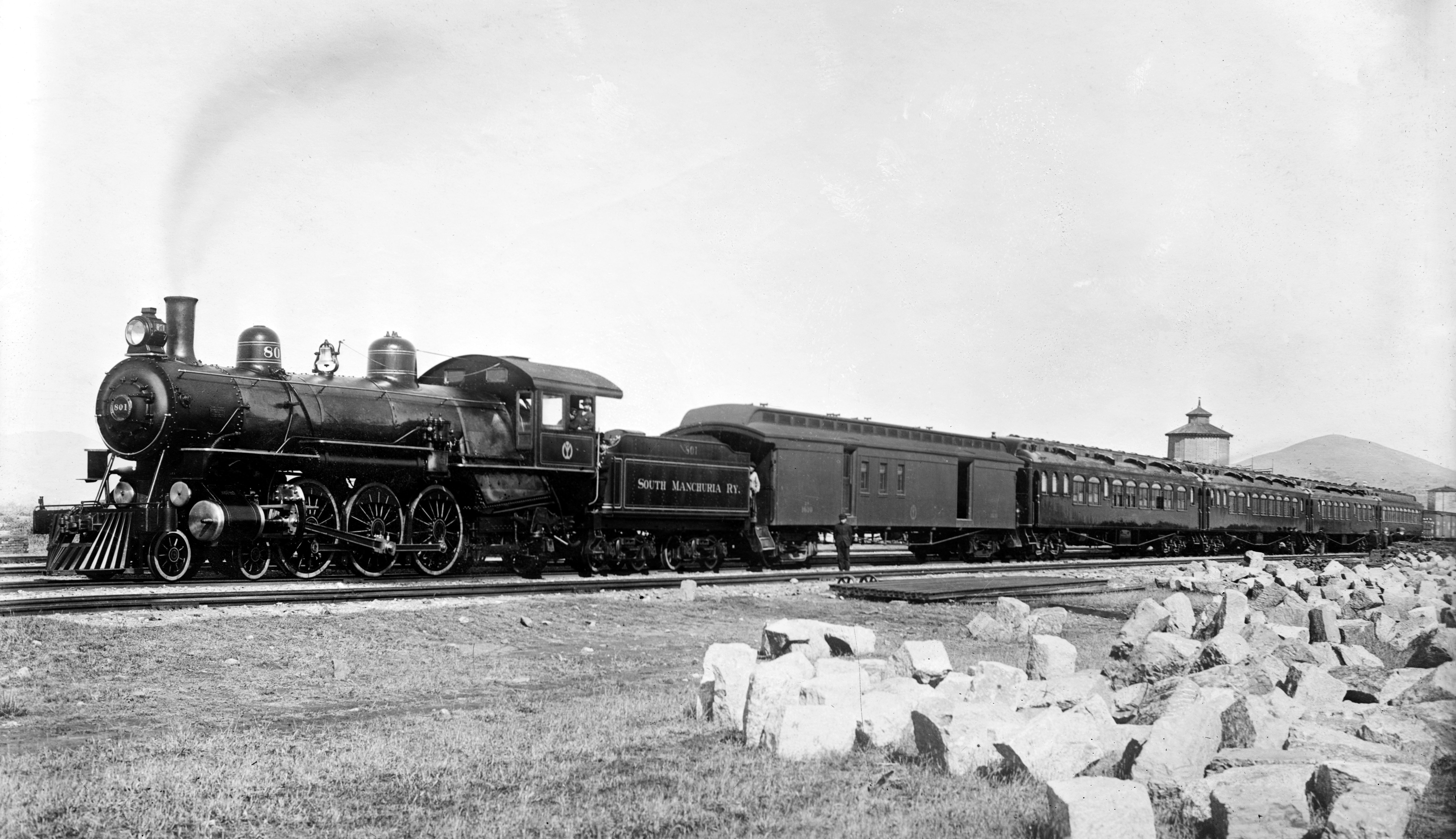
A train with an American-made locomotive on the South Manchuria Railway in northeastern China.

During the Republic of China era from 1912 until 1949, the development of the railway network in China slowed due to repeated civil wars and the invasion of Japan in the Second Sino-Japanese War. One of the few exceptions was in Northeastern China (Manchuria). The Russian Empire opened the Chinese Eastern Railway in 1901; after the Russo-Japanese War (1904–1905), the Japanese gained control of the portion of the Chinese Eastern Railway south of Changchun, using it to create the South Manchuria Railway Company (SMR) in 1906; this company was often referred to as "Japan's East India Company in China" due to its extensive influence in the political and economic situation of Manchuria. During the reign of the Fengtian warlords from 1912 till 1931, numerous privately owned railway companies were formed. Some of the railway investment in the late 1930s was financed by the China Development Finance Corporation associated with businessman and statesman T. V. Soong.

After the Japanese staged the Mukden Incident on 18 September 1931 as a pretext for invading Manchuria and the subsequent establishment of a puppet state called "Manchukuo", private railways were nationalized and merged to form the Manchukuo National Railway (MNR). In 1935, the Japanese bought the northern portion of the Chinese Eastern Railway from the Soviet Union and merged it into the MNR. In addition to the MNR and SMR, several other railway companies were established in the Japanese-occupied parts of China, including the North China Transportation Company, the Central China Railway, and the East Manchuria Railway. In 1945, just after the Second Sino-Japanese War, there were 27,000 km (16,777 mi) of rail, of which nearly half – 13,000 km (8,078 mi) – was located in Manchuria.

=== People's Republic of China (1949–present) ===
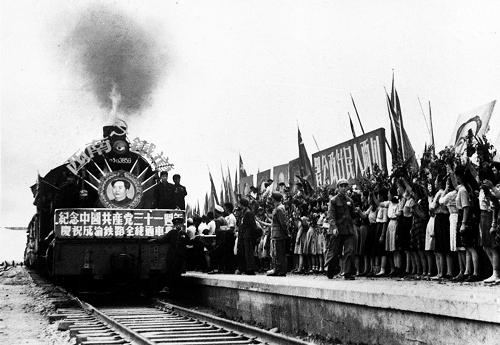
The opening ceremony of the Chengdu–Chongqing Railway in 1953. The Chengyu Railway was the first railroad built after the founding of the People's Republic of China in 1949.

After the establishment of the People's Republic of China, the new government under Mao Zedong invested heavily in the railway network. The Ministry of Railway's railroad building was important in China's national industrialization campaigns, mass mobilization, and military logistics. Academic Elisabeth Köll writes that during the Mao era, the Ministry's railways "represented the speed, economic efficiency, punctuality, discipline, technological advances, professionalism, dedication, and heroism necessary to promote the ideals of the party and the government at large."

The first time that Chinese enterprises designed or built their own locomotives was after the founding of the People's Republic of China. Because of the emphasis on national self-reliance in Mao era China, the locomotive industry relied primarily on domestically developed technologies. Because of limitations in coal, China developed and mass-produced diesel locomotives.

From the 1950s to the 70s, lines, especially those in western China, were expanded. One example is the 1,900 km (1,181 mi) railway from Lanzhou to Ürümqi, which was built between 1952 and 1962. In Southwestern China, where difficult terrain prevails, several mountain railways were constructed, such as the Baoji–Chengdu railway, built in the 1950s, and the Chengkun railway, built in the 1970s. The railway to Tibet, one of the highest in the world, was finally completed and opened to the public in 2006. Today, every province-level entity of China, with the exception of Macau, is connected to the railway network.

Not only has the Chinese railway network expanded in size since 1949, but it has also seen great technological advances. Before the 1980s, most of the railways were powered by steam. China's first diesel locomotive, the Dongfeng, was introduced in 1958 and their first production model diesel, the DF4, was introduced in 1969. However, the early dieselization efforts were slowed by problems with the early DF4s and steam locomotive production continued into the late 1980s. During the 1980s and 90s, diesel and electric locomotives replaced the steam engines on main lines. However, steam locomotives didn't retire from some provincial railways until the 21st century. In December 2005, the world's last regular revenue mainline steam train finished its journey on the Jitong railway, marking the end of the steam era. Nevertheless, there are still some steam locomotives used in the industrial railways in China.

Rail in China expanded greatly beginning in 1965 with the Third Front campaign to develop basic industry and national defense industry in China's rugged interior in case of invasion by the Soviet Union or the United States. The primary achievement of railroad construction during the Third Front construction was the building of ten new interprovincial lines. Building the Chengdu-Kunming and the Guiyang-Kunming lines linked all southwest provincial capitals using rail for the first time. The Xiangfan-Chongqing and Hunan-Guizhou connected the central and western provinces by rail for the first time.The additional rail built during this period greatly decreased travel time in the country's interior.

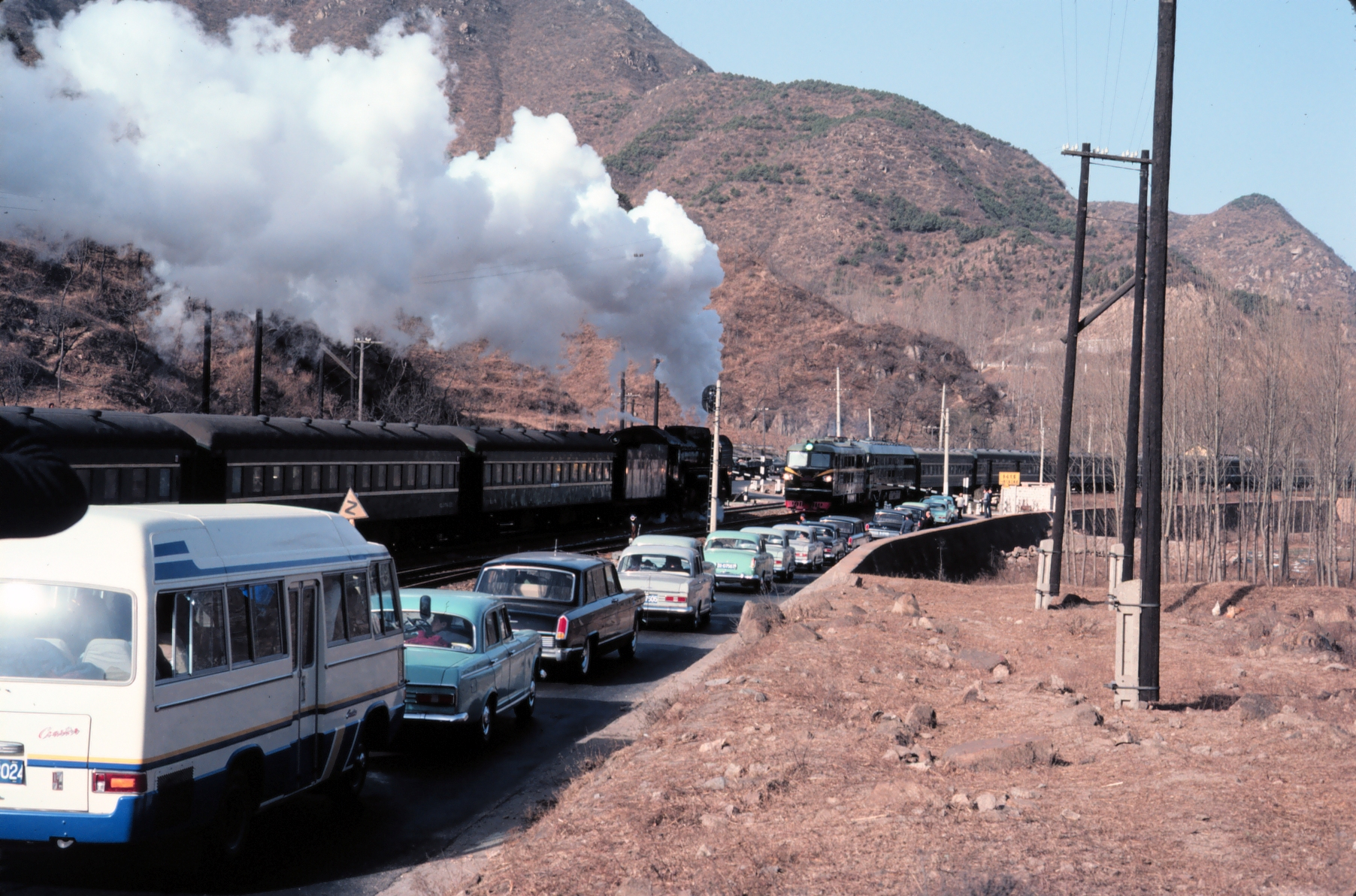
A steam locomotive and a diesel locomotive near the Badaling Great Wall in Beijing in 1979.

From 1990 to 2001, on average some 1,092 km (679 mi) of new railways, 837 km (520 mi) of multiple-track, and 962 km (598 mi) of electrified railways were opened to traffic annually, 2.4-fold, 1.7-fold and 1.8-fold increases respectively over the previous 10 years. At the end of 2004, railways in operation reached 74,200 km (46,106 mi), including 24,100 km (14,975 mi) of multiple track and 18,900 km (11,744 mi) of electrified railways.

Since 1997, train speed has been raised significantly six times. The top speed of express trains increased from 120 to 200 km/h (75 to 124 mph), and passenger trains can reach maximum speed of 350 km/h (220 mph) on some sections of the arterial railways.

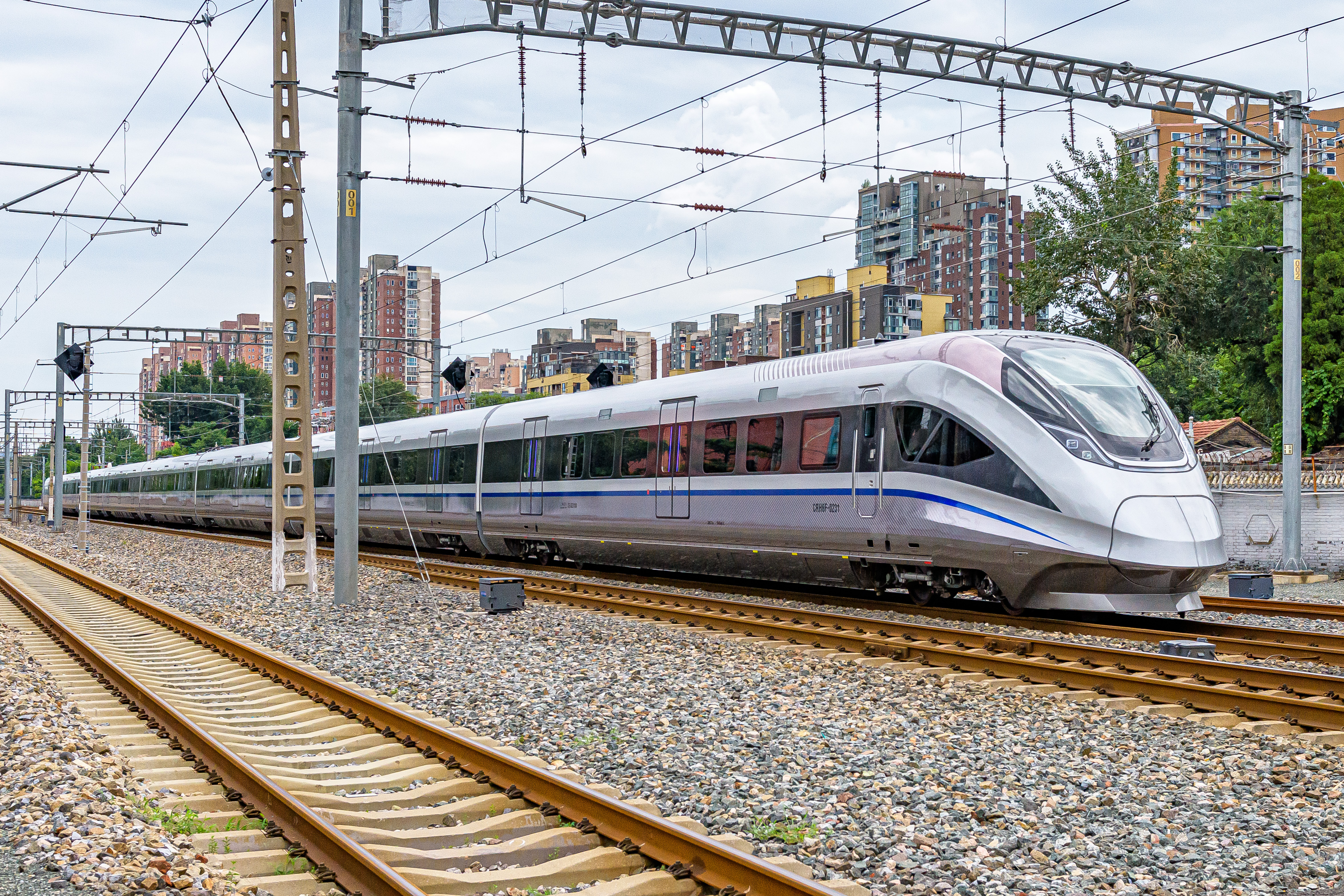
China Railway CRH6F which runs on the same line near Badaling nowadays

In March 2013, the Ministry of Railways was dissolved and its safety and regulation duties were taken up by the Ministry of Transport, inspection duties by the State Railway Administration and construction and management by the China Railway Corporation (CR).

In 2020, China Railway announced plans to expand the railway network by 33% or about 95,000 kilometres (59,030 mi), aiming to connect all cities with a population of over 200,000 by rail, and all with a population of over 500,000 by high-speed rail before 2035. As of July 2020, 95% of cities over 1 million have been connected by high-speed rail.

== Railway administration ==
Railways in China are defined into three main legal categories: national railways, local railways and designated railways. National railways are managed by the State Council of the national government and account for the bulk of railways in China. Local railways, which are operated by provincial or municipal governments, totaled a mere 40,000 km (24,855 mi) in 2013, less than 4% of the national total. Designated railways are operated by enterprises such as mines and steel mills. Since the 1980s, the national and local governments have jointly funded railway construction, sometimes using private capital. Joint stock railways constituted about 32% of the national network in 2013. The Luoding Railway in Guangdong, built as a joint-stock railway with investments from the local and national governments in 2001, was gradually privatized and is one of the few privately owned passenger railways.

China's railway sector is essentially operated by the central government. For over fifty years, except for a brief interlude during the Cultural Revolution, all national railways were operated and regulated by the Ministry of Railways of the People's Republic of China. In March 2013, the State Council broke up the Railway Ministry into the National Railway Administration to oversee railway regulation and the China Railway Corporation, a state-owned company, to operate the national railways. The National Railway Administration is a sub-ministerial bureau assigned to the Ministry of Transport. The China Railway Corporation is a ministerial-level state company under the State Council. The last railway minister, Sheng Guangzu, became the general manager of the China Railway Corp. He outranks Lu Dongfu, the chief of the National Administration of Railways, who had previously been a deputy railway minister.

=== Railway bureaus and management ===
The China Railway Corporation assumed most of the assets of the Ministry of Railways and continues to manage the railways at three levels—the national level, the bureau or subsidiary company level, and the station level. Below are the 18 rail bureaus of the China Rail Corporation and the number of passenger stations each bureau managed in 2013. The National Railway Administration has seven oversight bureaus, based in Shenyang, Shanghai, Guangzhou, Chengdu, Wuhan, Xi'an and Lanzhou, to oversee these China Railway bureaus.

- Beijing Railway Bureau (138)
- Chengdu Railway Bureau (105)
- Guangzhou Railway Group (97)
- Harbin Railway Bureau (280)
- Hohhot Railway Bureau (52)
- Jinan Railway Bureau (280)
- Kunming Railway Bureau (40)
- Lanzhou Railway Bureau (54)
- Nanchang Railway Bureau (84)
- Nanning Railway Bureau (107)
- Qinghai-Tibet Railway Group (8)
- Shanghai Railway Bureau (138)
- Shenyang Railway Bureau (408)
- Taiyuan Railway Bureau (82)
- Ürümqi Railway Bureau (22)
- Wuhan Railway Bureau (66)
- Xi'an Railway Bureau (94)
- Zhengzhou Railway Bureau (62)

=== Revenues and investments ===
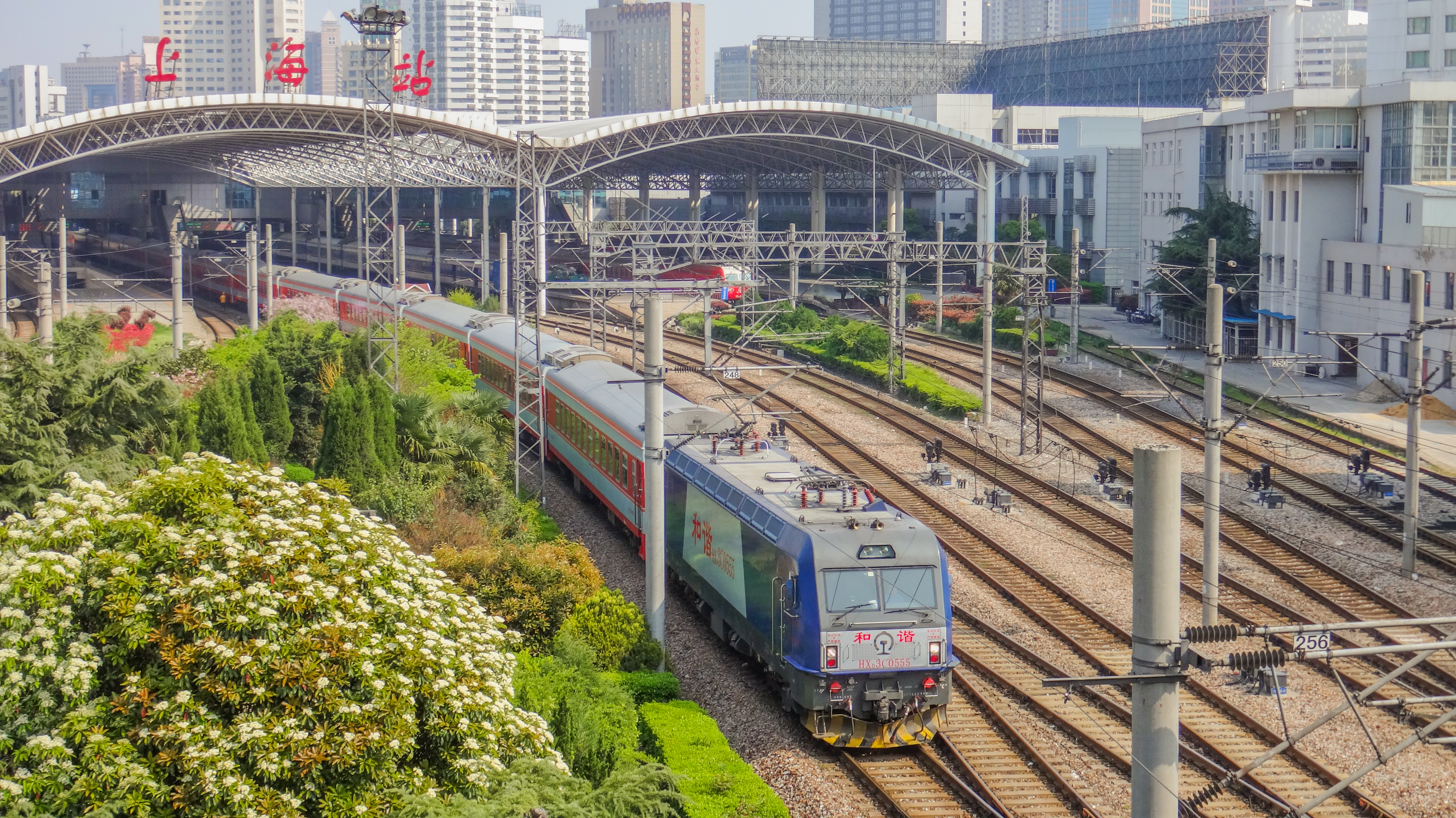
A passenger train leaving the Shanghai railway station.

In 2013, railway transport generated ¥605 billion in revenues, an increase of 14.1% from the year before.

To meet growing demand for rail service, the state is making large investments in rolling stock and infrastructure. In 2013, investments in rail totaled ¥808.8 billion, of which ¥662.3 billion on rail infrastructure, and ¥146.5 billion on rolling stock.

=== Employment ===
The railways employed 2,184,400 workers in 2013, an increase of 139,000 from the year before. Worker output averaged ¥482,600 per person.

=== Energy use ===
In 2014, the railways consumed 16.526 million tonnes of coal equivalent of energy, a decrease of 4.6% or 801,000 tonnes from 2013. It took 4.51 tonnes of coal equivalent to transport one million tonne-km of freight.

== Track network ==
As of 2019, the length of railways in China totaled 139,000 km (86,371 mi), including 59% double tracked (83,000 km (51,574 mi)) and 71.9% electrified (100,000 km (62,137 mi)), and 35,000 kilometres (21,748 miles) of high-speed rail (HSR) network. Railway electrification is made with the AC 25 kV 50 Hz system.

China had the second longest railway network in the world and the longest high-speed rail network, and all provinces and regions are connected by high-speed rail except for Tibet due to its extreme terrain and sparse population.

In 2011, the network length was about 91,000 kilometres (56,545 miles), including 41.1% double tracked (37,000 km (22,991 mi)) and 46.6% electrified (42,000 km (26,098 mi)). As of 2014 50.8% of the railroad was double-tracked (57,000 kilometres (35,418 miles)) and 58.3% was electrified (65,000 kilometres (40,389 miles)). The railway network's density was 116.48 km per 10,000 km^{2}.

Map of railways in China, with high-speed rail lines shown in colour. The China Railway Corporation operates railways in mainland China. Railways in Hong Kong are operated by the MTR Corporation.

Rail track length

Year	km	±%
1949	21,800	—
1955	25,600	+17.4%
1960	33,900	+32.4%
1965	36,400	+7.4%
1970	41,000	+12.6%
1975	46,000	+12.2%
1980	53,300	+15.9%
1985	55,000	+3.2%
1990	57,800	+5.1%
1995	62,400	+8.0%
2000	68,700	+10.1%
2005	75,400	+9.8%
2010	90,504	+20.0%
2011	93,300	+3.1%

Year	km	±%
2012	97,600	+4.6%
2013	103,000	+5.5%
2014	112,000	+8.7%
2015	121,000	+8.0%
2016	124,000	+2.5%
2017	127,000	+2.4%
2018	131,000	+3.1%
2019	139,000	+6.1%
2020	146,000	+5.0%
2021	150,000	+2.7%
2022	155,000	+3.3%
2025	170,000	+9.7%
2035	200,000	+17.6%

Source: ^{[a]}

High Speed Rail track length

Year	km	±%
2008	2,740	—
2009	3,676	+34.2%
2010	5,149	+40.1%
2011	8,358	+62.3%
2012	9,356	+11.9%
2013	11,028	+17.9%
2014	16,726	+51.7%
2015	19,210	+14.9%
2016	22,000	+14.5%

Year	km	±%
2017	23,000	+4.5%
2018	29,000	+26.1%
2019	32,200	+11.0%
2020	37,900	+17.7%
2021	40,000	+5.5%
2022	42,000	+5.0%
2025	50,000	+19.0%
2035	70,000	+40.0%

=== Track gauge ===
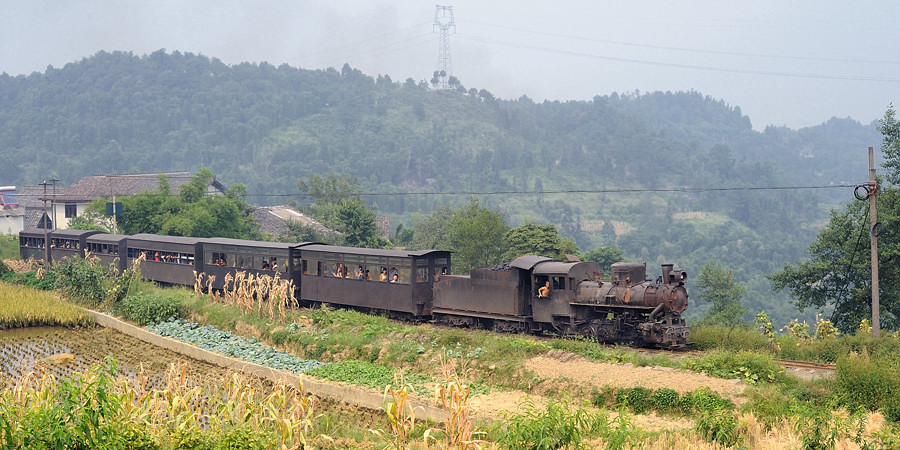
The 2 ft 6 in (762 mm) gauge Jiayang Coal Railway in Sichuan Province, is the only steam train in operation, which is usually full of tourists in holidays.

- Standard gauge: 79,685 kilometres (49,514 mi) 1,435 mm (4 ft 8 1/2 in) gauge (2008)
- Metre gauge: 466 kilometres (290 mi) 1,000 mm (3 ft 3 3/8 in) (Kunming–Hai Phong railway)
- Narrow gauge: 3,600 kilometres (2,200 mi) 750 mm (2 ft 5 1/2 in) gauge local industrial lines (1998 est.)

=== Mainlines ===
Sixteen major rail corridors consisting of eight north–south "verticals" and eight east–west "horizontals" connect 81 major cities. The 16 mainlines were designated in January 2001, when some 3,980 kilometres (2,470 mi) of the lines were still unbuilt. At that time, the existing mainlines accounted 43% of the railroads in the country but carried 80% of the passengers. The last of the vertical mainlines was completed in 2009 and the last horizontal line opened in 2010.

Verticals
1. Beijing–Harbin Railway
2. East Coast Corridor
3. Beijing–Shanghai Railway
4. Beijing–Kowloon Railway
5. Beijing–Guangzhou Railway
6. Datong–Zhanjiang Corridor (Datong–Puzhou, Taiyuan–Jiaozuo, Luoyang–Zhanjiang)
7. Baotou–Liuzhou Corridor (Baotou–Shenmu, Shenmu–Yan'an, Xi'an–Yan'an, Xi'an–Ankang, Xiangyang–Chongqing, Sichuan–Guizhou, Guizhou–Guangxi)
8. Lanzhou–Kunming Corridor (Longhai, Baoji–Chengdu, Chengdu–Kunming)

Horizontals
1. Beijing–Tibet (Beijing–Baotou, Baotou–Lanzhou, Lanzhou–Qinghai, Qinghai–Tibet)
2. Northern Coal Transport Corridor
3. Southern Coal Transport Corridor
4. Trans-Eurasia Corridor (Longhai, Lanzhou–Xinjiang, Northern Xinjiang)
5. Nanjing–Xi'an Railway
6. Yangtze River Corridor (Nanjing–Tongling, Tongling–Jiujiang, Wuhan–Jiujiang, Changjiangbu-Jingzhou, Yichang–Wanzhou, Dazhou–Wanzhou)
7. Shanghai–Kunming Railway
8. Southwest Coastal Access Corridor (Nanning–Kunming, Hunan–Guangxi, Litang–Zhanjiang)

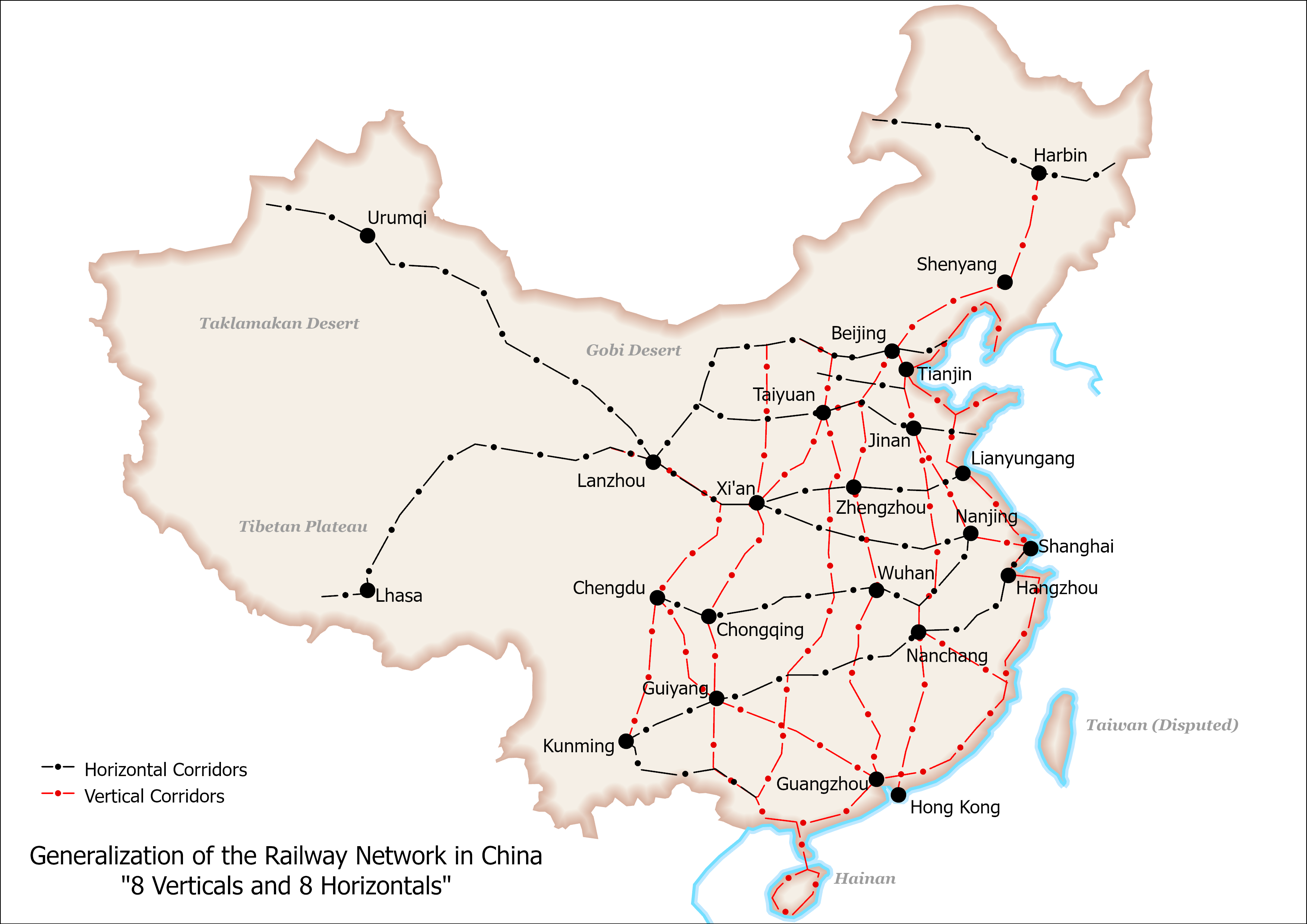
The 8 horizontal and 8 vertical mainlines of Chinese railway

=== High-speed lines ===
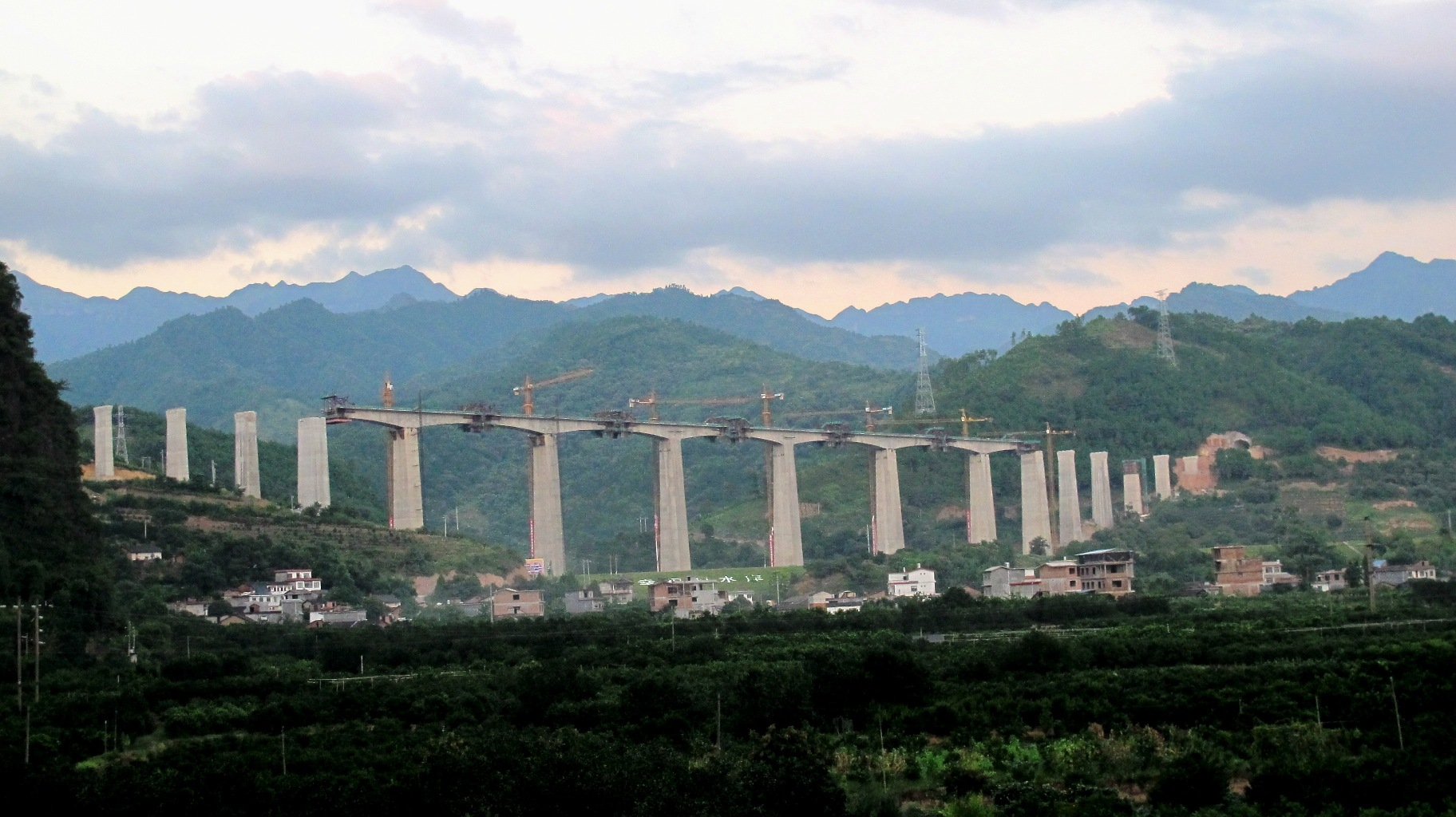
The Guiyang–Guangzhou High-Speed Railway under construction in Yangshuo, Guangxi in August 2013.

In the past decade, China has been building an extensive high-speed rail grid that is overlaid onto the existing railway network. This grid is composed of eight high-speed rail corridors, four verticals and four horizontals with a total length of 12,000 km (7,456 mi). Most of the new lines follow the routes of existing trunk lines and are designated for passenger travel only. Several sections of the national grid, especially along the southeast coastal corridor, were built to link cities that had no previous rail connections. Those sections will carry a mix of passenger and freight. High-speed trains on passenger dedicated lines can generally reach 300–350 km/h (190–220 mph). On mixed-use HSR lines, passenger train service can attain peak speeds of 200–250 km/h (120–160 mph). This ambitious national grid project was planned to be built by 2020, but the government's stimulus has expedited time-tables considerably for many of the lines.

Verticals
- Beijing–Harbin
- Beijing–Guangzhou
- Beijing–Shanghai
- Hangzhou–Fuzhou–Shenzhen

Horizontals
- Qingdao–Yinchuan
- Shanghai–Chongqing–Chengdu
- Shanghai–Kunming
- Xuzhou–Lanzhou

=== Stations ===
Railway stations in China are classified into six classes: special, first, second, third, fourth and fifth. A special class station can handle at least 60,000 passengers and 20,000 pieces of baggage, load at least 750 freight carriages or assign at least 6,500 carriages per day. A first class station can handle at least 15,000 passengers and 1,500 pieces of baggage, load 350 carriages or assign 3,000 carriages per day. A second class station can handle at least 5,000 passengers and 500 pieces of baggage, load 200 carriages or assign 1,500 carriages per day. In 2008, there were 5,470 train stations, including 50 special class stations, 236 first-class stations, 362 second-class stations and 936 third-class stations.

=== Bridges ===
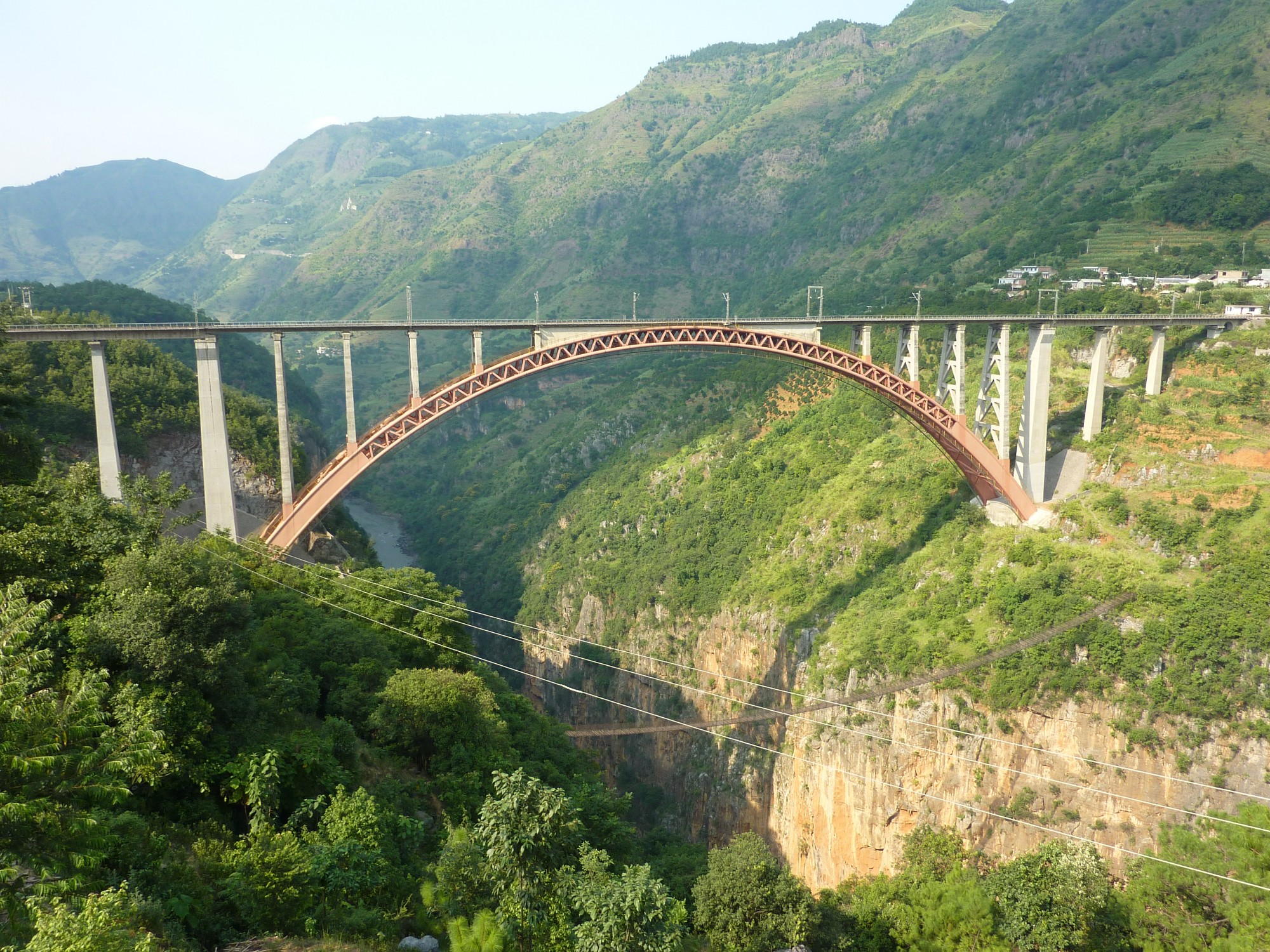
The Beipan River Bridge on the Liupanshui–Baiguo railway in Guizhou of southwest China, was the highest railway bridge in the world from 2001 to 2016. The bridge deck is 275 metres (902 feet) above the Beipan River in a deep gorge.

The rail network across China's diverse topography makes extensive use of bridges and tunnels. In recent years, advances in bridge-building and tunneling techniques have enabled Chinese railroad builders to reduce overall track length and increase train speeds on rail lines through rugged terrain. The Yichang–Wanzhou railway, built from 2003 to 2010 across the karst landscape between Wuhan and Chongqing, has 159 tunnels and 253 bridges, which account for 74% of the railway's total length. High-speed rail lines are often built on elevated tracks to reduce the need to acquire land and involve very long bridges. The Beijing–Shanghai high-speed railway has three of the longest railroad bridges in the world with lengths of 164.8 kilometres (102.4 miles), 113.7 kilometres (70.6 miles) and 48.15 kilometres (29.92 miles). The Beipan River Shuibai Railway Bridge built in 2003 in Guizhou is the world's highest railway bridge. Its bridge deck is 275 metres (902 feet) above the Beipan River in a deep gorge.

As of 2008, there were 47,524 railway bridges in use in mainland China (excluding Hong Kong and Taiwan), including 872 major bridges over 500 metres (1,600 feet) in length.

=== Tunnels ===
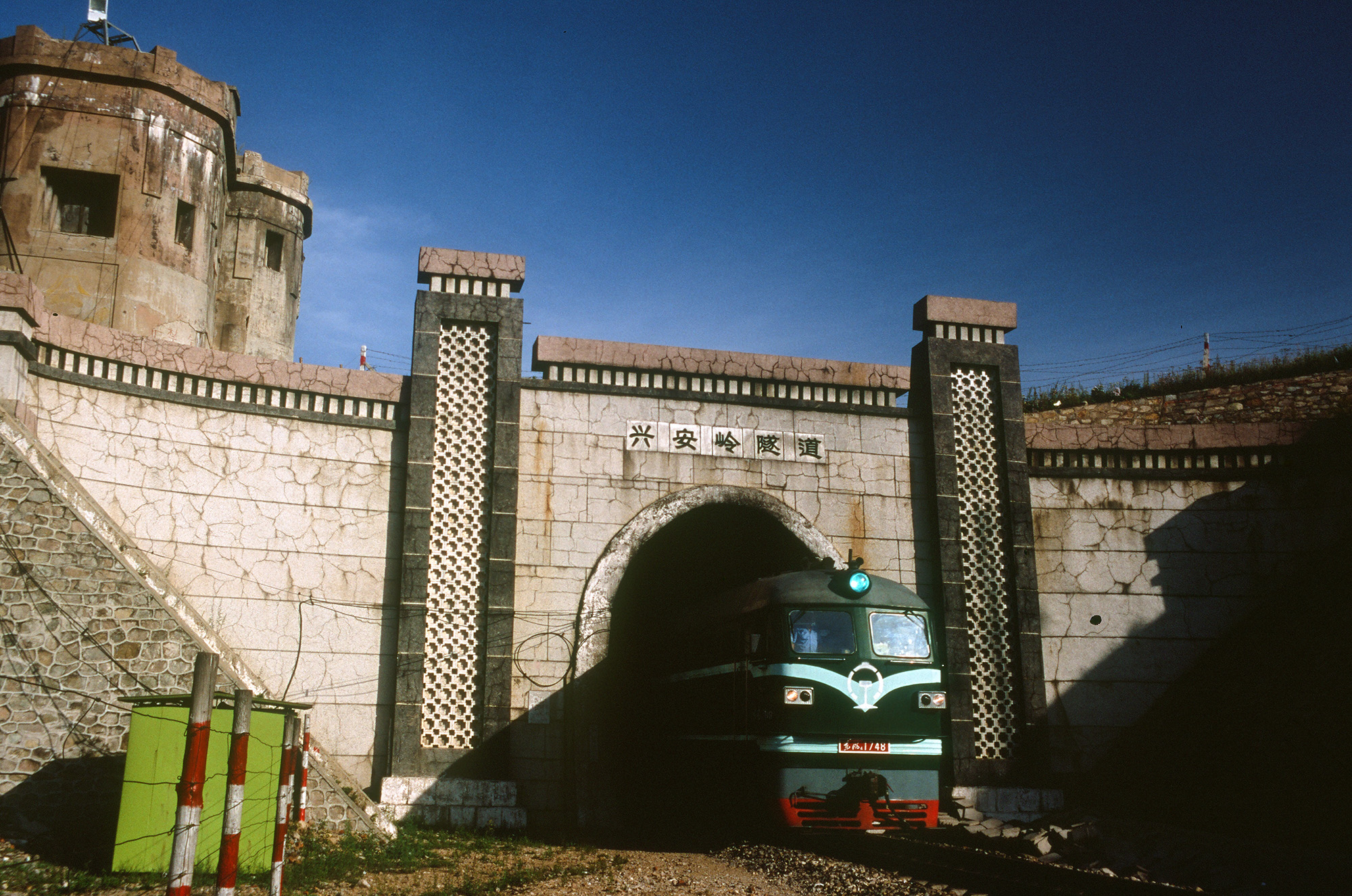
The Greater Khingan Ridge Tunnel on the Harbin–Manzhouli railway, built in 1904.

As of 2008, there were 6,102 railway tunnels in use in mainland China (excluding Hong Kong and Taiwan), including 183 over 3 kilometres (1.9 miles) and seven over 10 kilometres (6.2 miles) in length. The first railroad tunnel was built in 1888 by the Qing dynasty in Taiwan. The Shi-chiu-lin Tunnel near Keelung, 261 metres (856 feet) long, is now a historical landmark. The oldest rail tunnel on the mainland is the 3,077.2 metres (10,096 feet) Greater Khingan Rail Ridge built in 1904 on the Chinese Eastern Railway in modern-day Inner Mongolia. The longest tunnel in China is the 27,848 metres (91,365 feet) Taihangshan Tunnel on the Shijiazhuang–Taiyuan high-speed railway in northern China. Several longer tunnels are under construction.

=== Train ferries ===
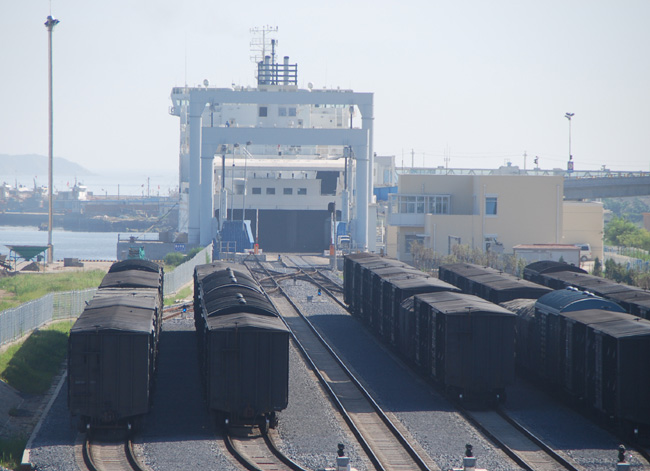
Freight cars at the Port of Lüshun, the northern terminus for the Bohai Train Ferry.

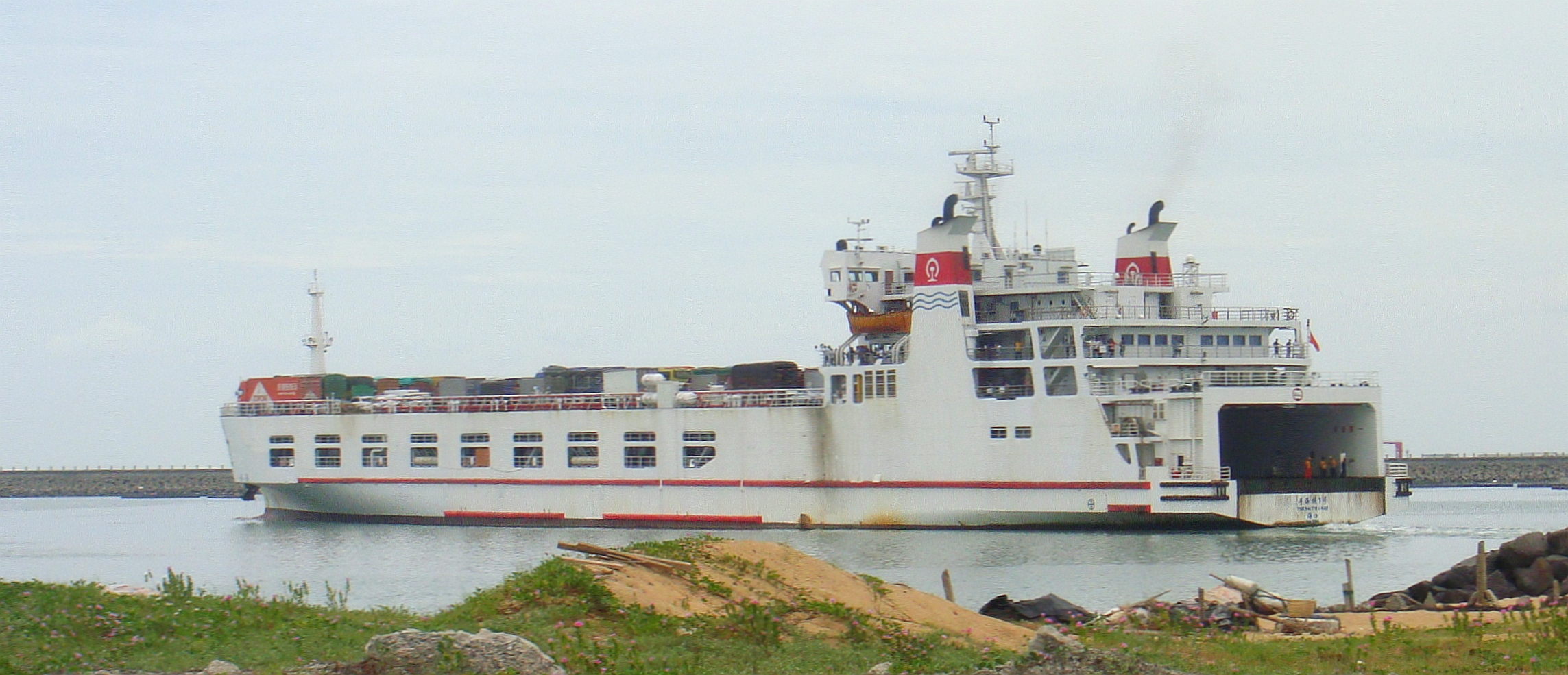
MV Yue Hai Tie 1 Hao, one of the ferries running across Qiongzhou Strait, forming part of Guangdong–Hainan railway

The most notable train ferries in China are the Guangdong–Hainan Ferry, across the Qiongzhou Strait between the Leizhou Peninsula on the south coast of Guangdong and the island of Hainan, and the Bohai Train Ferry, connecting the Liaodong and Shandong Peninsulas across the Bohai Bay. These two ferries began operating, respectively, in 2003 and 2007.

A river ferry carries trains on the Xinyi–Changxing railway across the Yangtze River at Jingjiang, halfway between Nanjing and Shanghai. In the first half of the 20th century, all trains traversing the Yangtze River required ferries. Since the completion of the Wuhan Yangtze River Bridge in 1953, at least fifteen railway bridges and two subway tunnels now span the Yangtze.

== High-speed rail ==
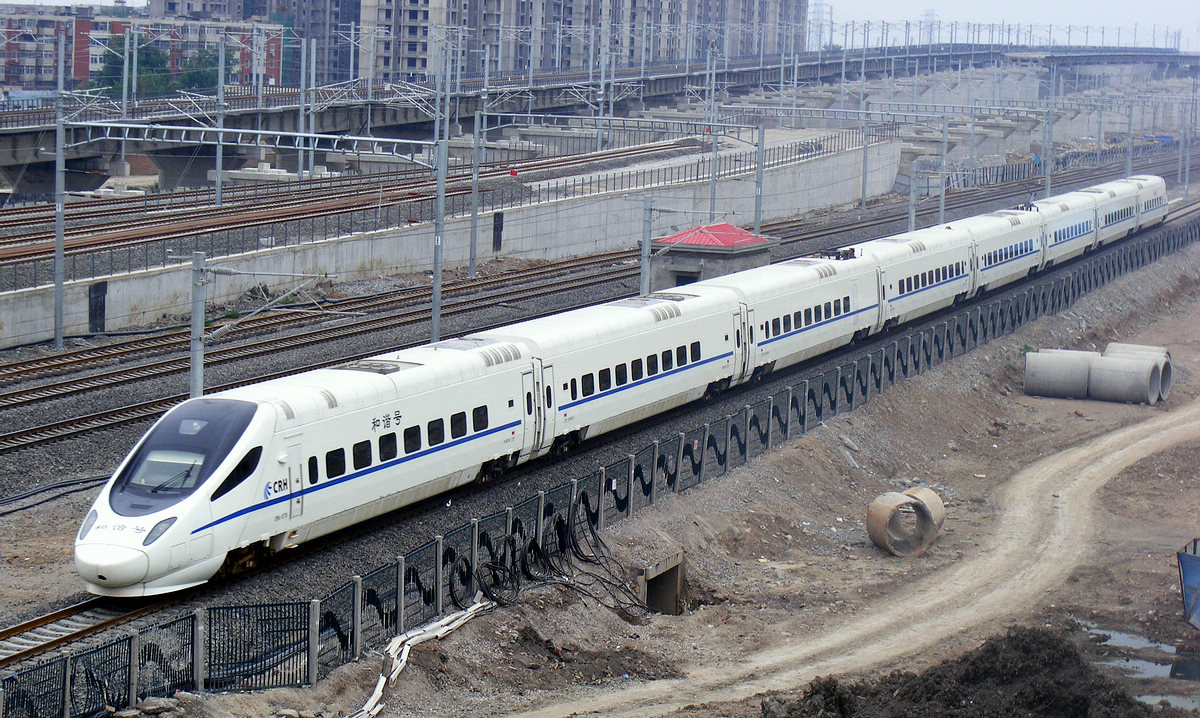
A CRH5 high-speed train on the Beijing–Shanghai railway.

High-speed rail in China refers to any train service (generally passenger only) with average train speeds above 200 kilometres per hour (120 mph). High-speed service on China Railway High-speed (CRH) train sets was officially introduced in 2007. These trains run on upgraded conventional lines as well as passenger dedicated high-speed track that can permit speeds of up to 350 kilometres per hour (220 mph). China has the world's longest high-speed railway.

In the decade prior to the introduction of high-speed rail, the travel speed of conventional trains was raised on most of the mainlines. By 2007, the top speed for passenger trains reached 200 kilometres per hour (120 mph) on main lines such as the Jinghu railway, Jingha railway, and Jingguang railway. Heavy-haul freight transportation speed limit was also boosted to 120 kilometres per hour (75 mph). This speed enhancement was expected to boost passenger and cargo capacity by 18 percent and 12 percent, respectivelysa. Some of the newly built high-speed passenger dedicated lines such as the Beijing–Tianjin intercity railway and Wuhan–Guangzhou high-speed railway had top speeds of 350 kilometres per hour (220 mph). Top train speeds were lowered to 300 kilometres per hour (190 mph) in 2011.

Prior to the adoption of conventional tracks for high-speed rail, planning authorities also experimented with maglev technology. The Shanghai maglev train built in 2004 remains the fastest train in the country with peak speeds of 431 kilometres per hour (268 mph). The train makes the 30.5 kilometres (19.0 mi) trip from the Pudong Airport to the city in less than 7.5 minutes.

== Passenger transport ==
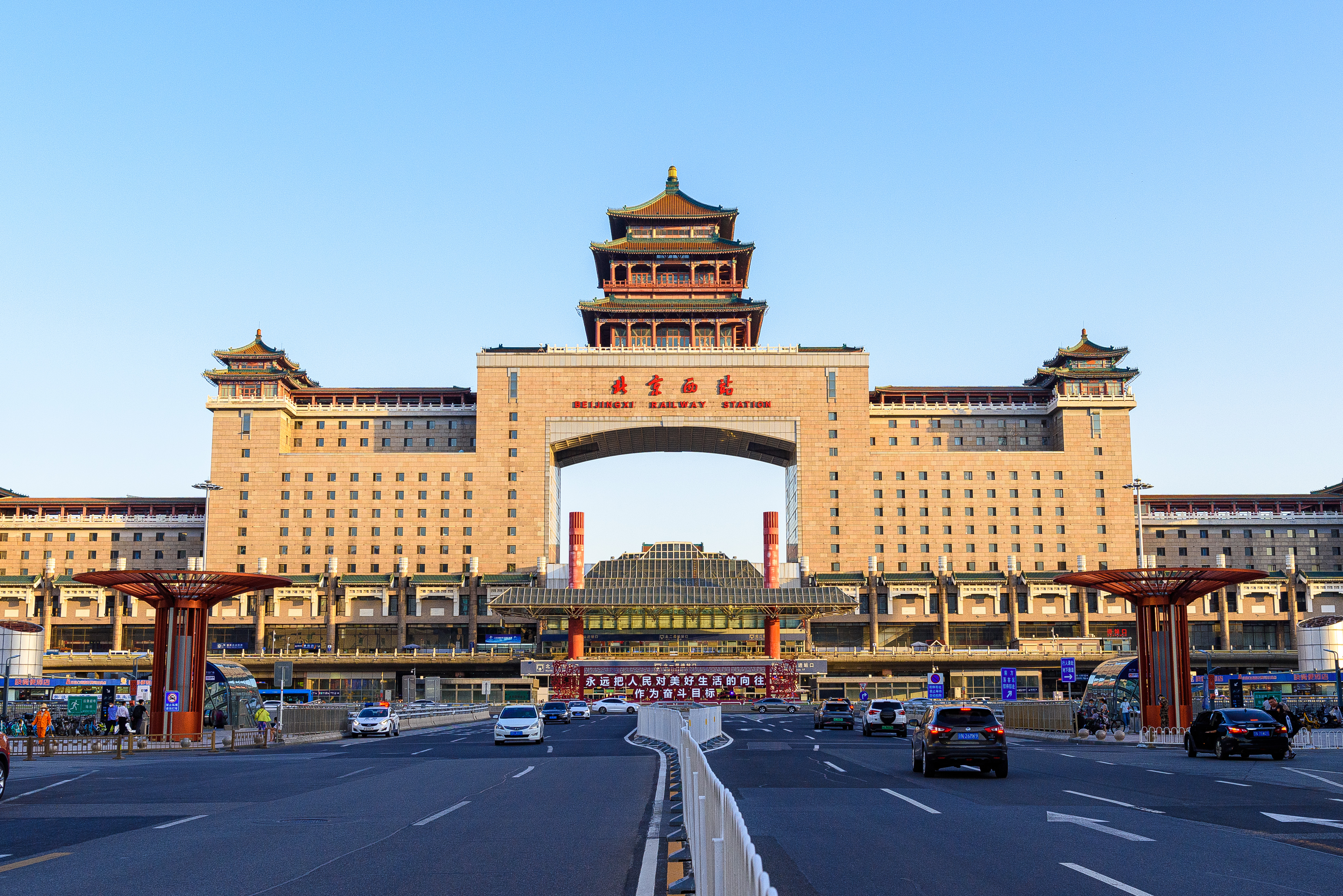
The Beijing West railway station, opened in 1996, is one of the largest rail stations in Asia. The station handles an average of 150,000–180,000 passengers per day.

Rail is one of the principal means of passenger transport in China. In 2014, railways delivered 2.357 billion passenger trips and generated 1,160.48 billion passenger-km, compared to 1.456 billion trips and 772.8 billion passenger-km in 2008. The sharp increase in the number of train trips taken is driven by the rapid growth of high-speed rail service.

Average trip distance declined slightly from 530 to 503 km (329 to 313 mi), which shows that train travel is primarily used for long-distance trips. This contrasts greatly with countries such as Germany, where the average rail trip is only about 40 km (25 mi) long. The difference may be explained by the near-absence of traditional commuter rail systems (low cost, frequent service, frequent stops) in China; the incipient Beijing Suburban Railway may perhaps be their only specimen in the country. However, a number of high-speed intercity railways have been opened since 2005, and many more are under construction; they may attract an increasing share of short-distance trips.

=== Classes of service ===
Passenger trains are identified by their class of service (usually indicated by letter prefix for faster trains) followed by three to four numerals indicating the bureau and region of operation. The syllables in bold will be used in broadcasting in train stations, for example, C1234 will be pronounced as cheng-1234.

Trains starting with G, C, D are run by CRH EMUs and form the high-/higher-speed network in China, while other trains are locomotive-hauled conventional trains.

Class		Description
G	High Speed	Long-distance very high-speed service with EMU. Maximum speed 300 km/h (190 mph) to 350 km/h (220 mph) depends on lines. G1–G5998 for cross-bureau service; G6001–G9998 for service within one railway bureau
G	**Gāo**sù 高速	Long-distance very high-speed service with EMU. Maximum speed 300 km/h (190 mph) to 350 km/h (220 mph) depends on lines. G1–G5998 for cross-bureau service; G6001–G9998 for service within one railway bureau
D	Electrical Multiple Unit	Long-distance service with EMU. Maximum speed 160 km/h (99 mph) to 250 km/h (160 mph) depends on lines. D1–D3998 for cross-bureau service; D4001–D9998 for service within one railway bureau, while D701–799 and D7001–7999 are for service converted from former Direct Express services or new service operated under maximum speed 160 km/h (99 mph).
D	**Dòng**chē zǔ 动车组	Long-distance service with EMU. Maximum speed 160 km/h (99 mph) to 250 km/h (160 mph) depends on lines. D1–D3998 for cross-bureau service; D4001–D9998 for service within one railway bureau, while D701–799 and D7001–7999 are for service converted from former Direct Express services or new service operated under maximum speed 160 km/h (99 mph).
C	Intercity	Regional fast Intercity service with EMU. Maximum speed 200 km/h (120 mph) to 350 km/h (220 mph) depends on lines. C1–C1998 for cross-bureau service; C2001–C9998 for service within one railway bureau
C	**Chéng**jì 城际	Regional fast Intercity service with EMU. Maximum speed 200 km/h (120 mph) to 350 km/h (220 mph) depends on lines. C1–C1998 for cross-bureau service; C2001–C9998 for service within one railway bureau
Z	Direct Express	Conventional Direct Express service between two major cities with few main station or no intervening stops; often overnight trains with most of sleepers. Maximum speed 160 km/h (99 mph).
Z	**Zhí**dá tèkuài 直达特快	Conventional Direct Express service between two major cities with few main station or no intervening stops; often overnight trains with most of sleepers. Maximum speed 160 km/h (99 mph).
T	Express	Long-distance service stopping only at provincial capitals, subprovincial-level and major prefecture-level cities. Maximum speed 140 km/h (87 mph). T1–T4998 for cross-bureau service; T5001–T9998 for service within one railway bureau
T	**Tè**kuài 特快	Long-distance service stopping only at provincial capitals, subprovincial-level and major prefecture-level cities. Maximum speed 140 km/h (87 mph). T1–T4998 for cross-bureau service; T5001–T9998 for service within one railway bureau
K	Fast	Service stopping at prefectural and higher-level cities. Maximum speed 120 km/h (75 mph). K1–K6998 for cross-bureau service; K7001–K9998 for service within one railway bureau
K	**Kuài**sù 快速	Service stopping at prefectural and higher-level cities. Maximum speed 120 km/h (75 mph). K1–K6998 for cross-bureau service; K7001–K9998 for service within one railway bureau
	Regular Fast; Pǔ kuài 普快	Regular service stopping at all prefectural and higher-level cities and some county-level cities. Maximum speed 120 km/h (75 mph). 1001–1998 for service across three bureaus; 2001–3998 for service across two bureaus, and 4001–5998 for service within one railway bureau
	Regular; Pǔ kè 普客	Regular service stopping at all passenger stations along route. Maximum speed 100 km/h (62 mph). 6001–6198 for cross-bureau service. 6201–7598 for service within one railway bureau
L	Temporary	Additional holiday service, especially for Chinese New Year travelers, provide three classes of service of Regular Passenger Train, Regular Fast and Fast train. L1001–L6998 for service across bureaus; L7001-L9998 for service within one railway bureau
L	**Lín** kè 临客	Additional holiday service, especially for Chinese New Year travelers, provide three classes of service of Regular Passenger Train, Regular Fast and Fast train. L1001–L6998 for service across bureaus; L7001-L9998 for service within one railway bureau
Y	Tourist	Summertime service to tourist destinations. Y1-Y498 for service across bureaus; Y501-998 for service within one railway bureau
Y	Lǚ**yóu** 旅游	Summertime service to tourist destinations. Y1-Y498 for service across bureaus; Y501-998 for service within one railway bureau

Regular services stopping at all stations remain mostly limited to remote areas lacking high-speed services, including many ethnic minority regions, and are heavily subsidized.

=== Types of cars ===
The newer high-speed train service (Classes G, C and D) that use electrical multiple units have the following types of cars:

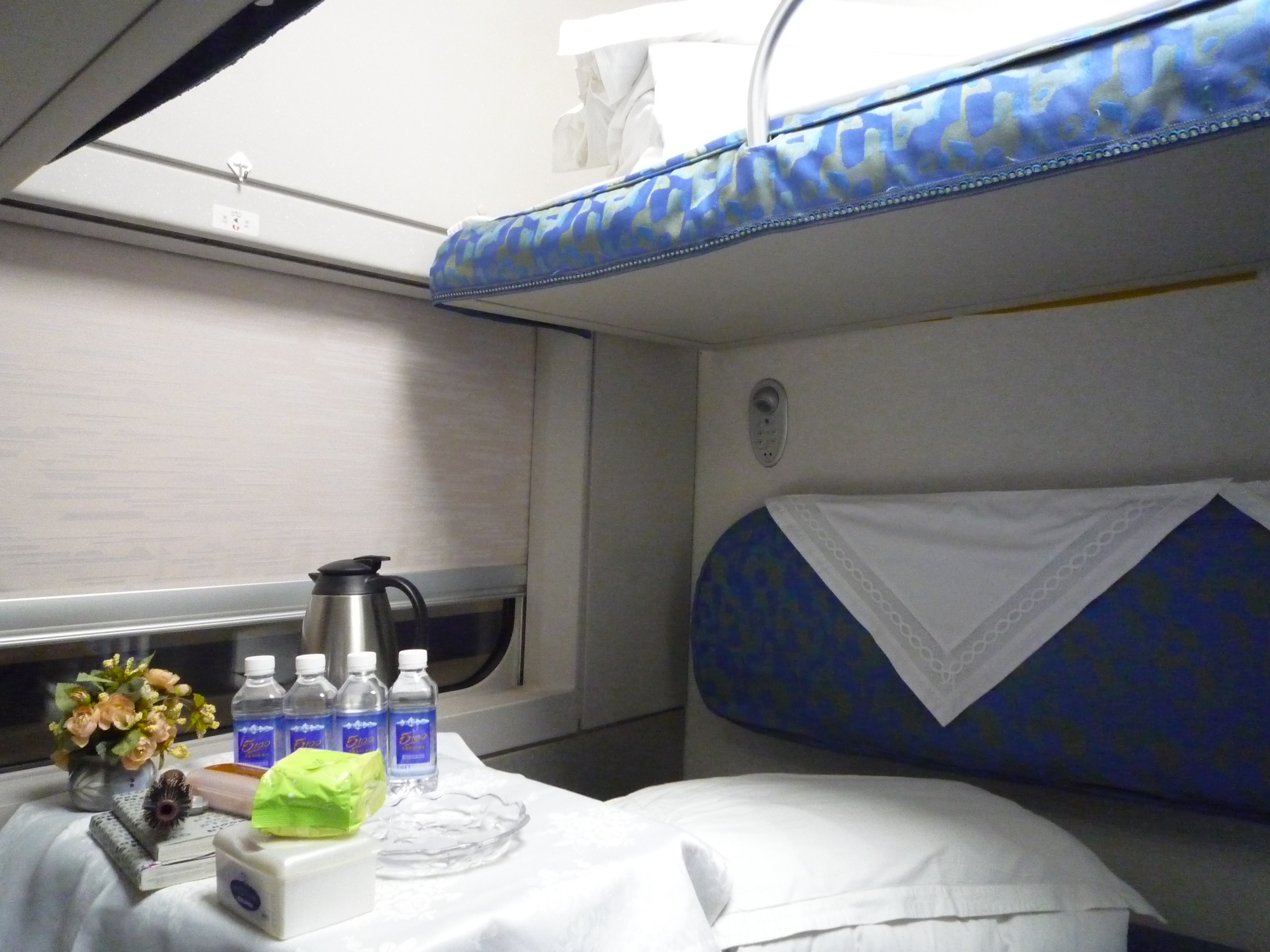
Sleeping compartment (WR) of CRH2 trainset

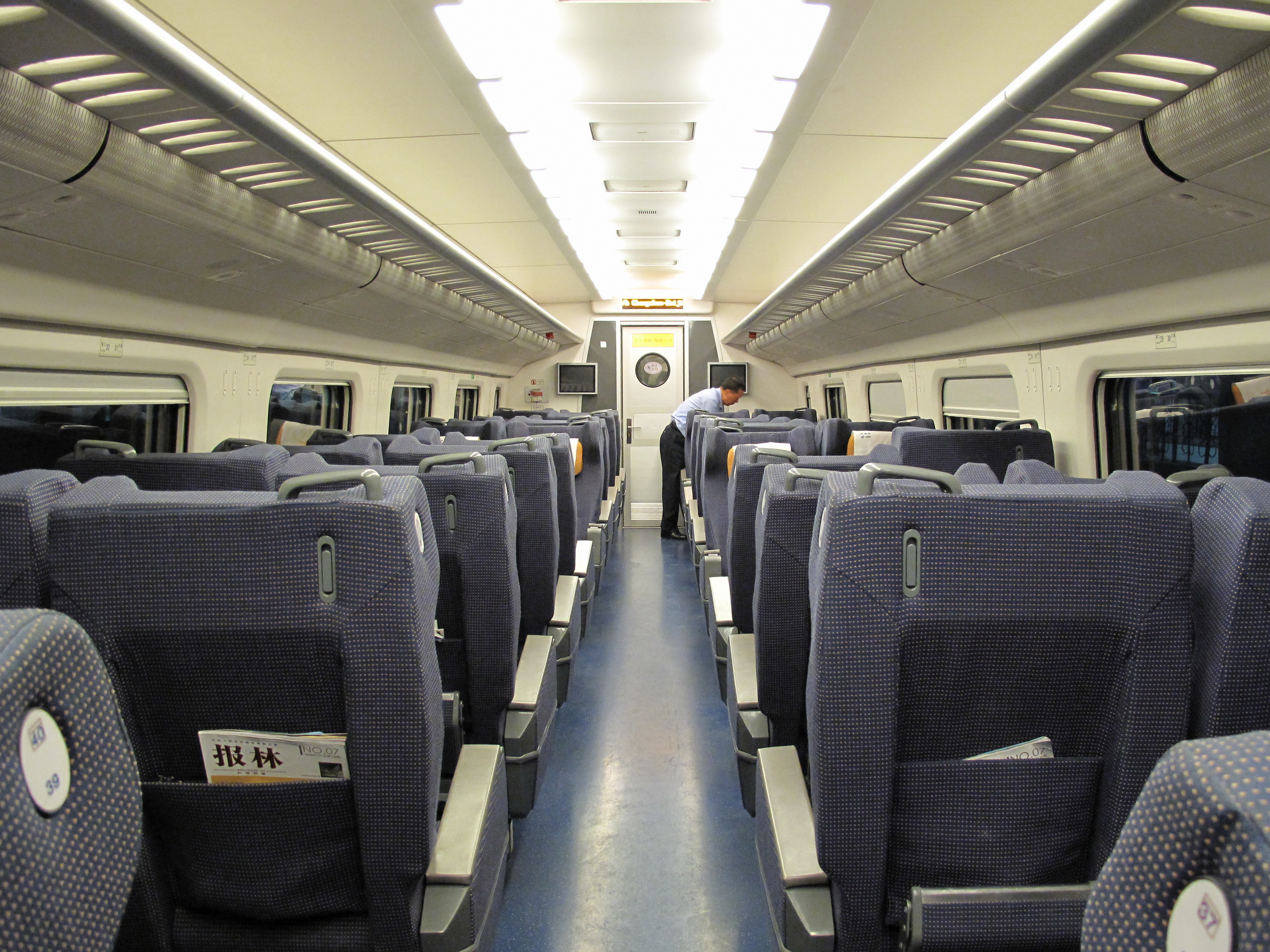
First class coach (ZY) of CRH5A trainset

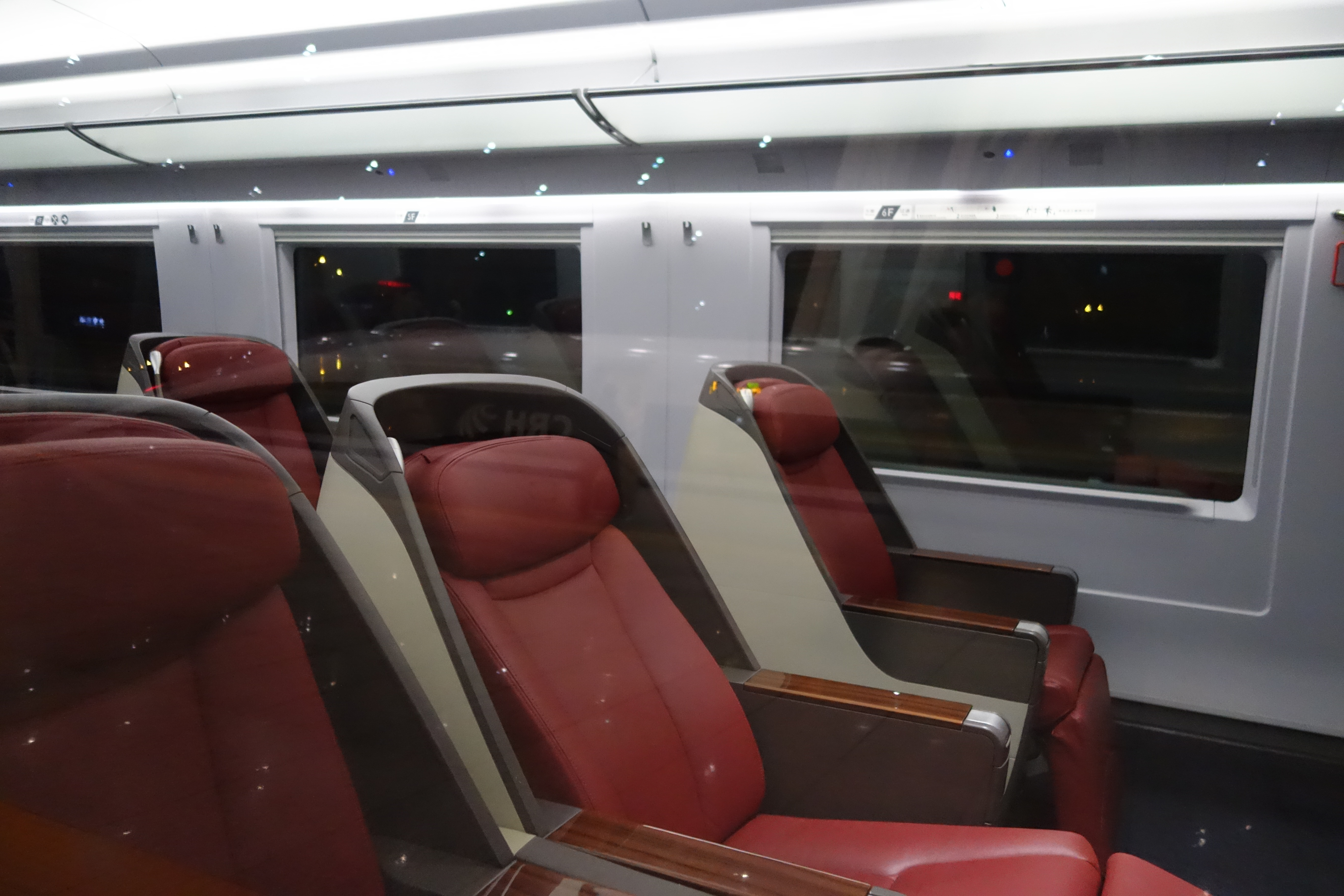
Business class coach (SW) of CRH380CL trainset

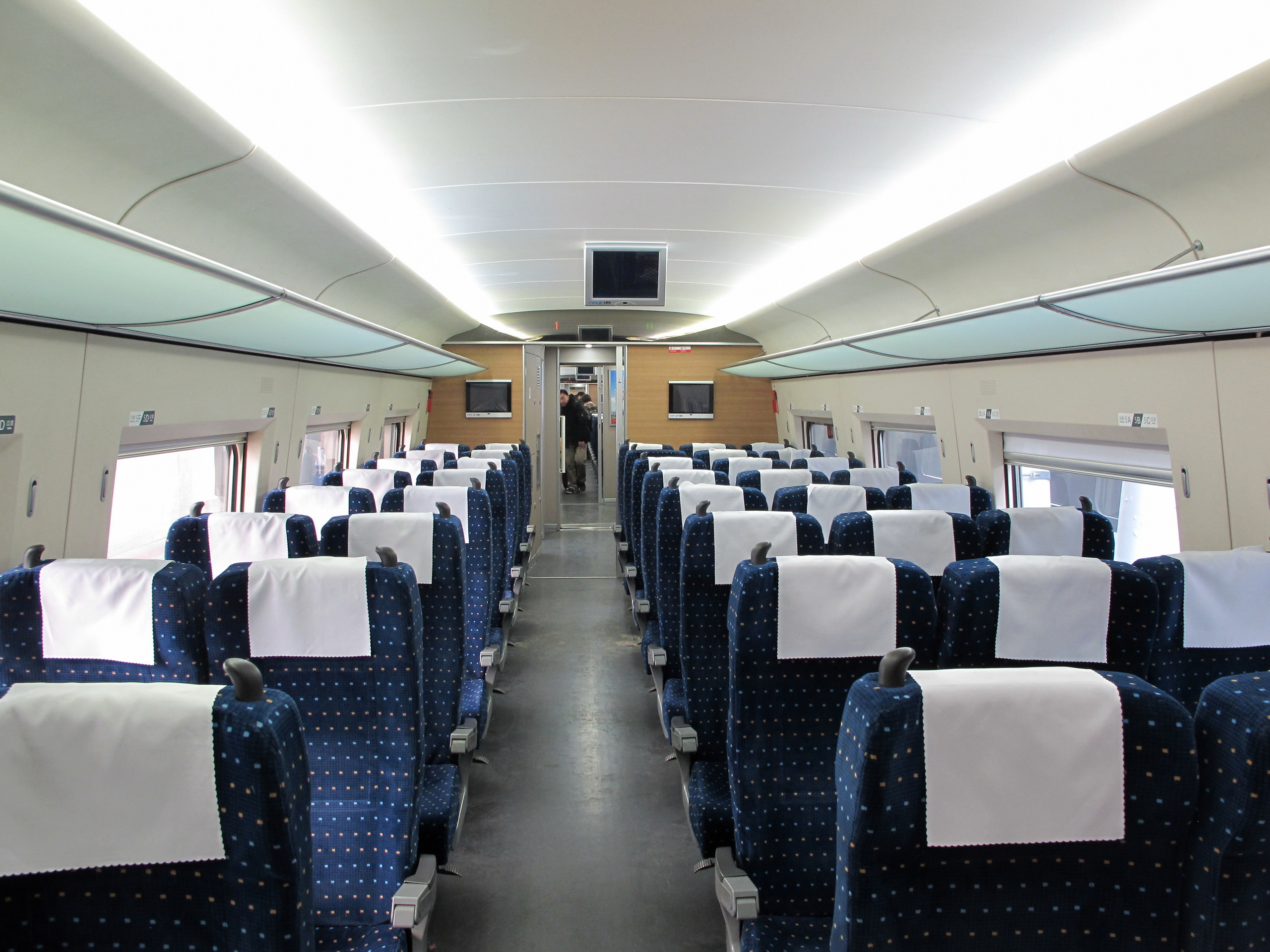
Second class coach (ZE) of CRH380A trainset

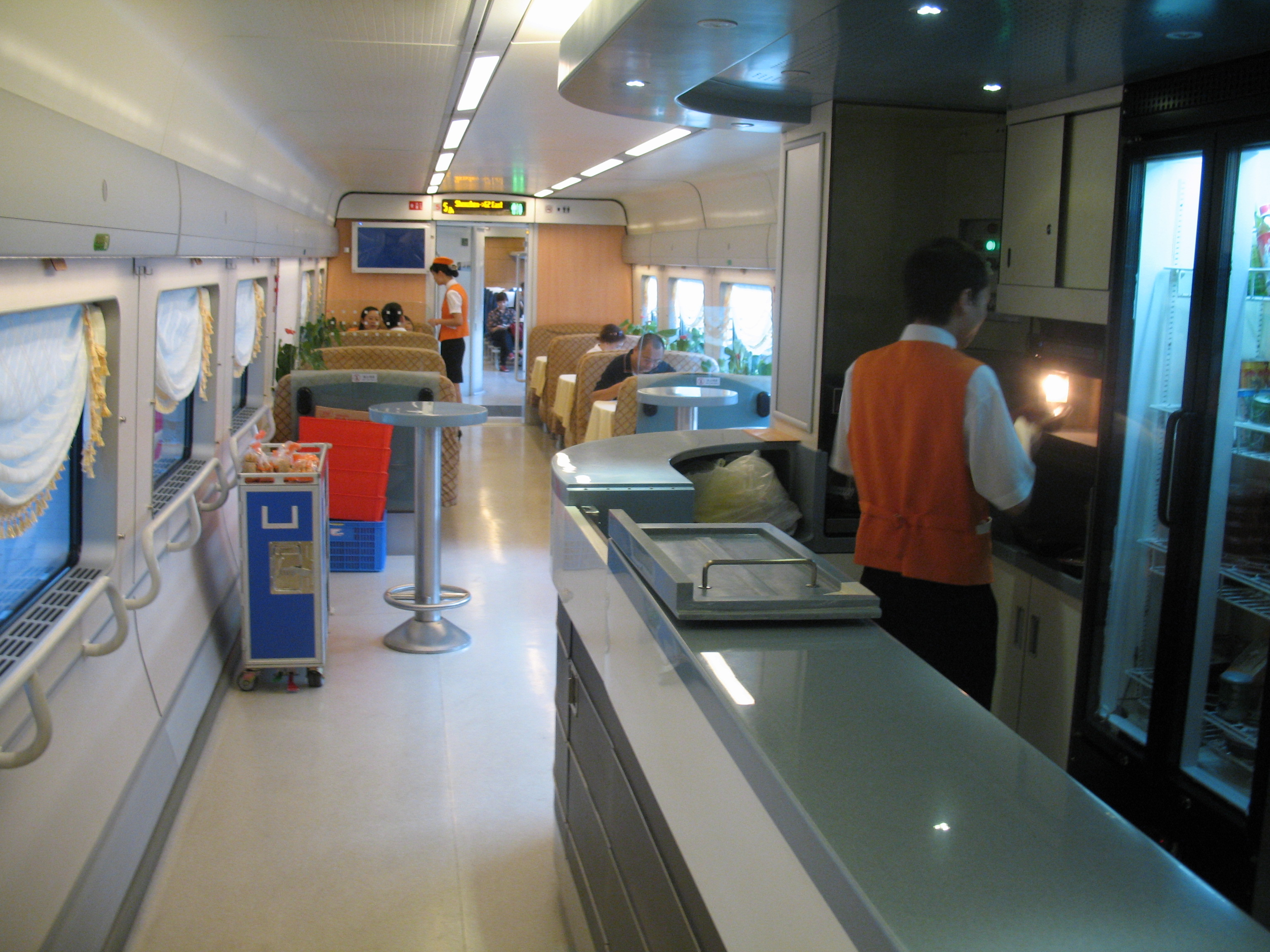
Dining car (CA) of CRH1 trainset

- **High-speed sleeper** carriages (WR), with capacity for 40, have 20 enclosed compartments each with two berths. A few trains have a **deluxe high-speed sleeper** (WG), with capacity for 40 and eight compartments that are more spacious. High-speed sleepers are found on some D-class overnight trains.
- **First class** coaches (ZY), with capacity for 44–72, have partially reclining plush seats and power outlets, there are four seats in each row.
- **Business class** coaches (SW), with capacity for 24–56, are found on some high-speed train sets such as the CRH380A and CRH380BL. They have reclining sofa seats with flat screen TVs, power outlets and other amenities. Only available on G trains and some D trains.
- **Second class** coaches (ZE), with capacity for 83–101, have the most affordable seats on high-speed trains, there are five seats in each row.

Most high-speed trains have dining cars (CA). Some have sight-seeing cars (ZYG, ZEG, SWG) that are attached to the front or end of the train.

The following types of cars are found on traditional, non-high-speed trains:

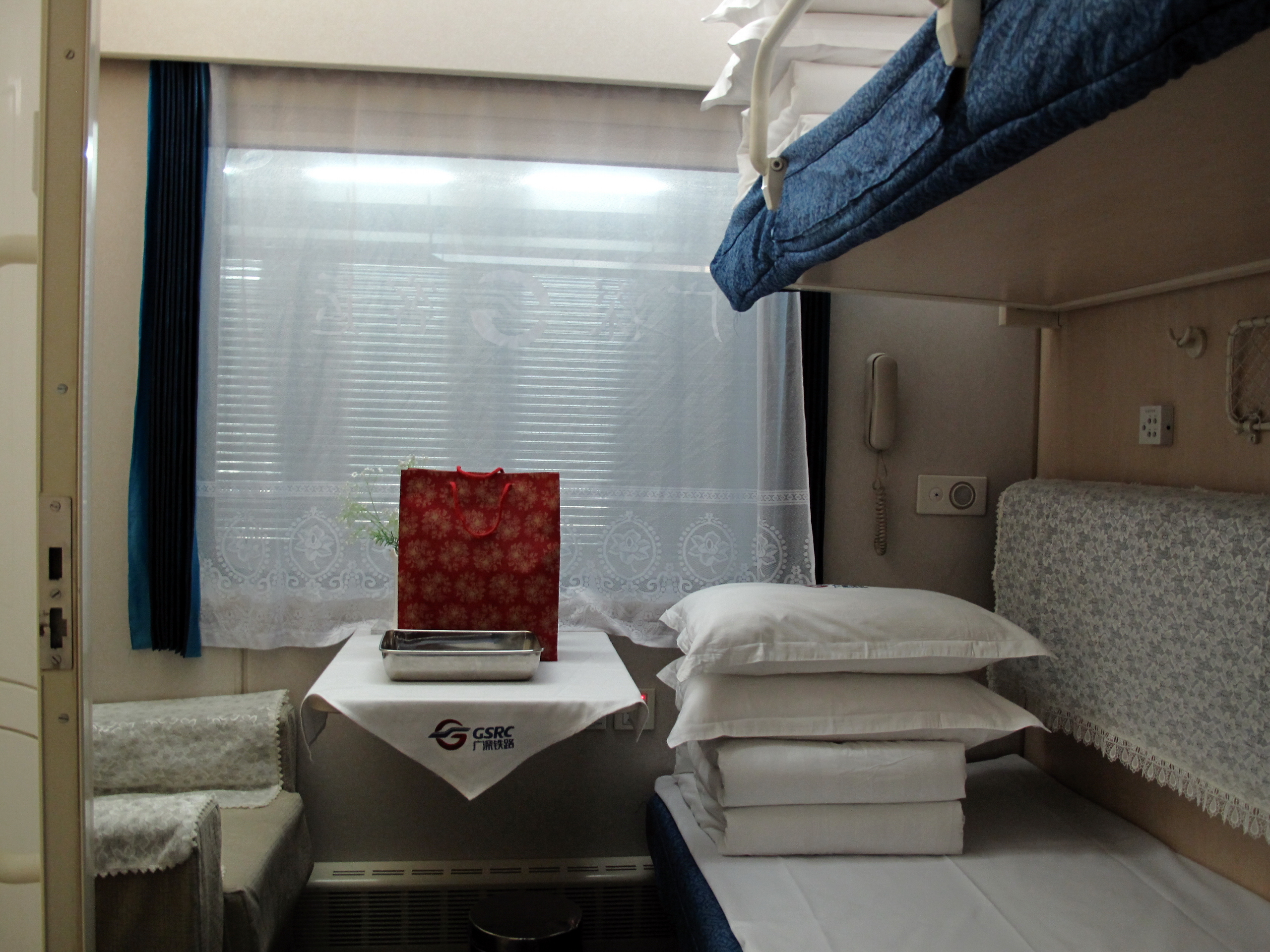
Deluxe soft sleeper

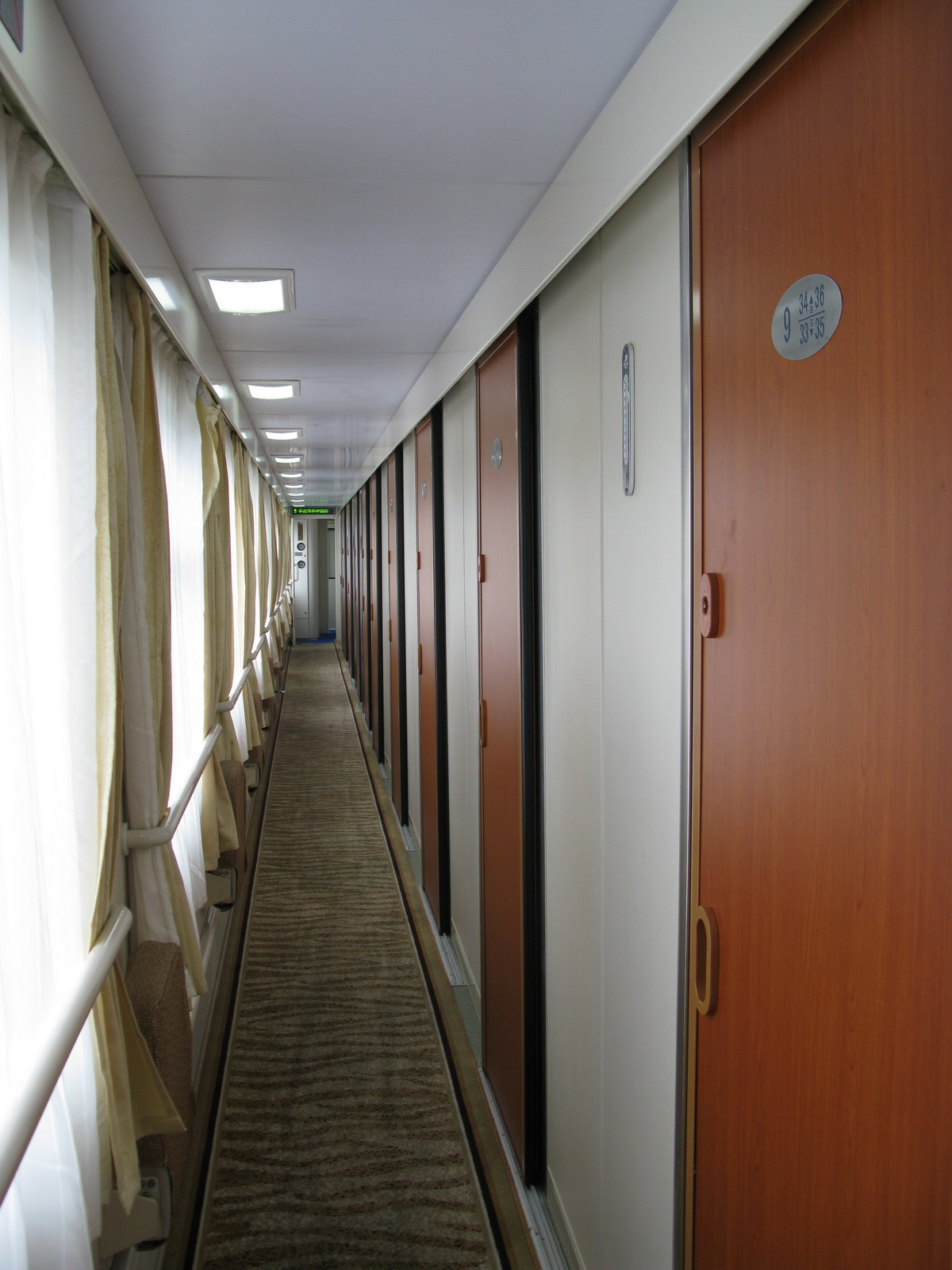
Soft sleeper (RW)

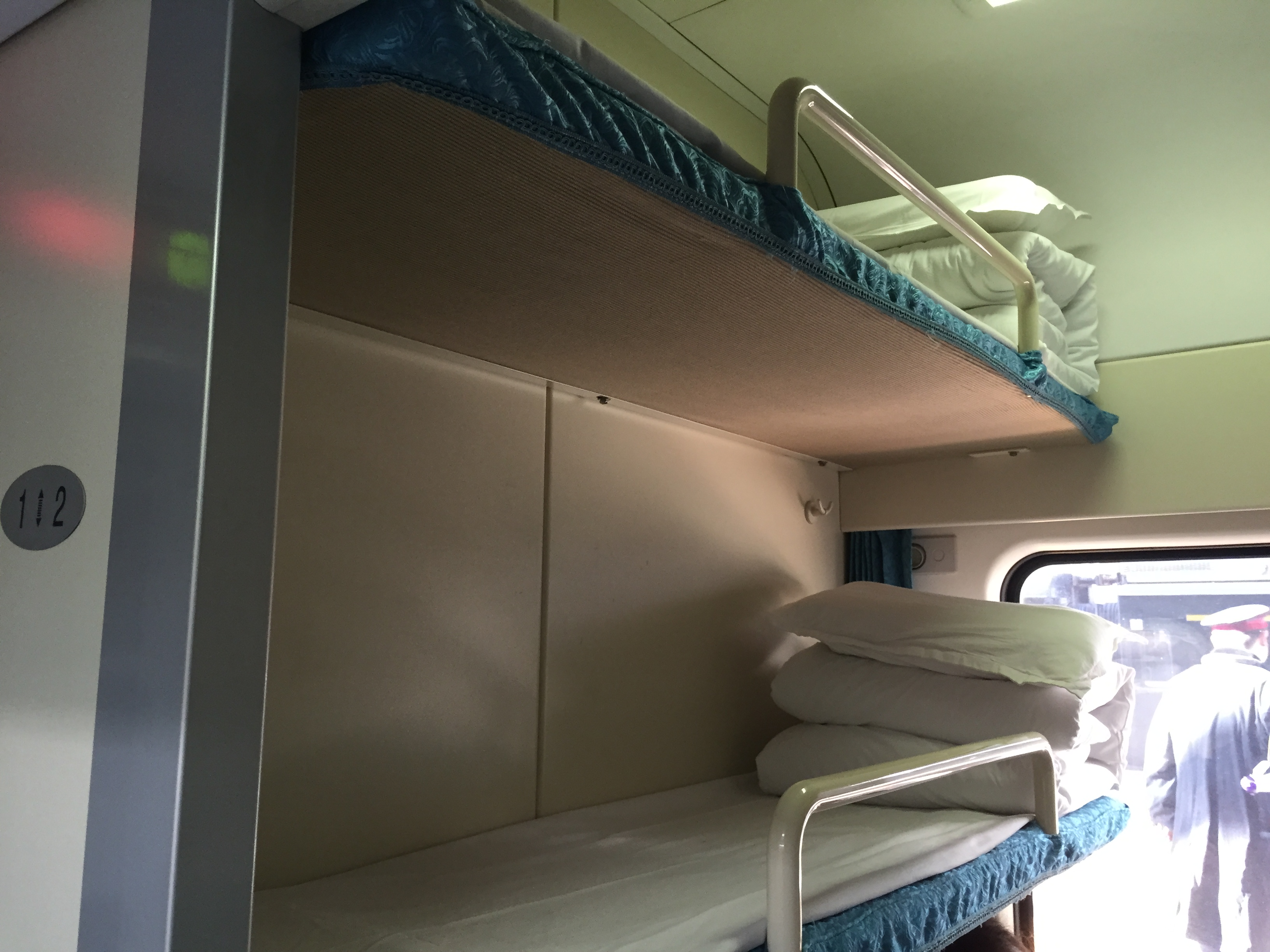
Semi-compartment hard sleeper (YW) on 25T coaches

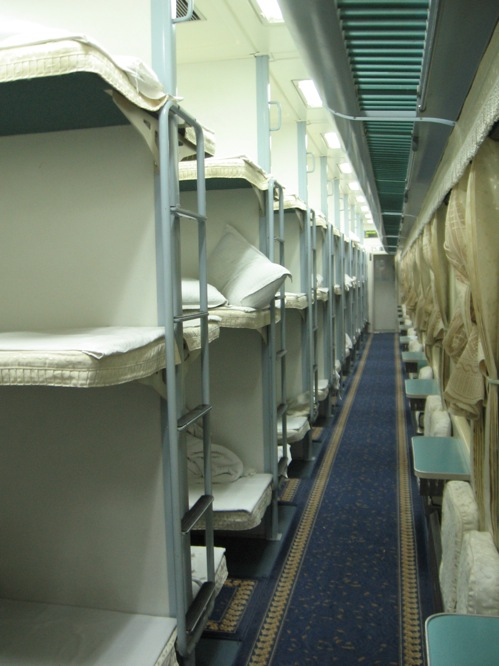
Open hard sleeper (YW)

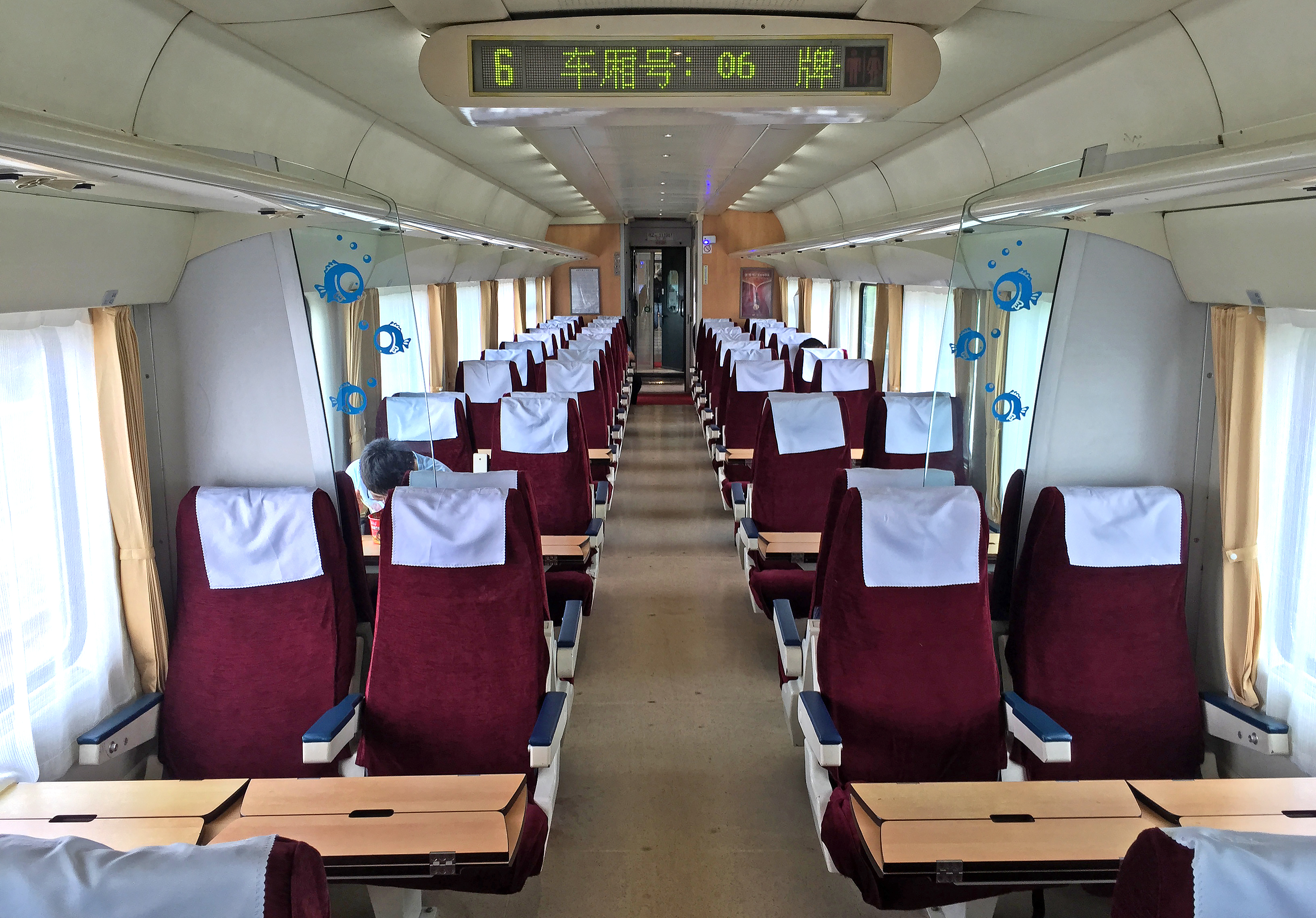
Soft seat (RZ)

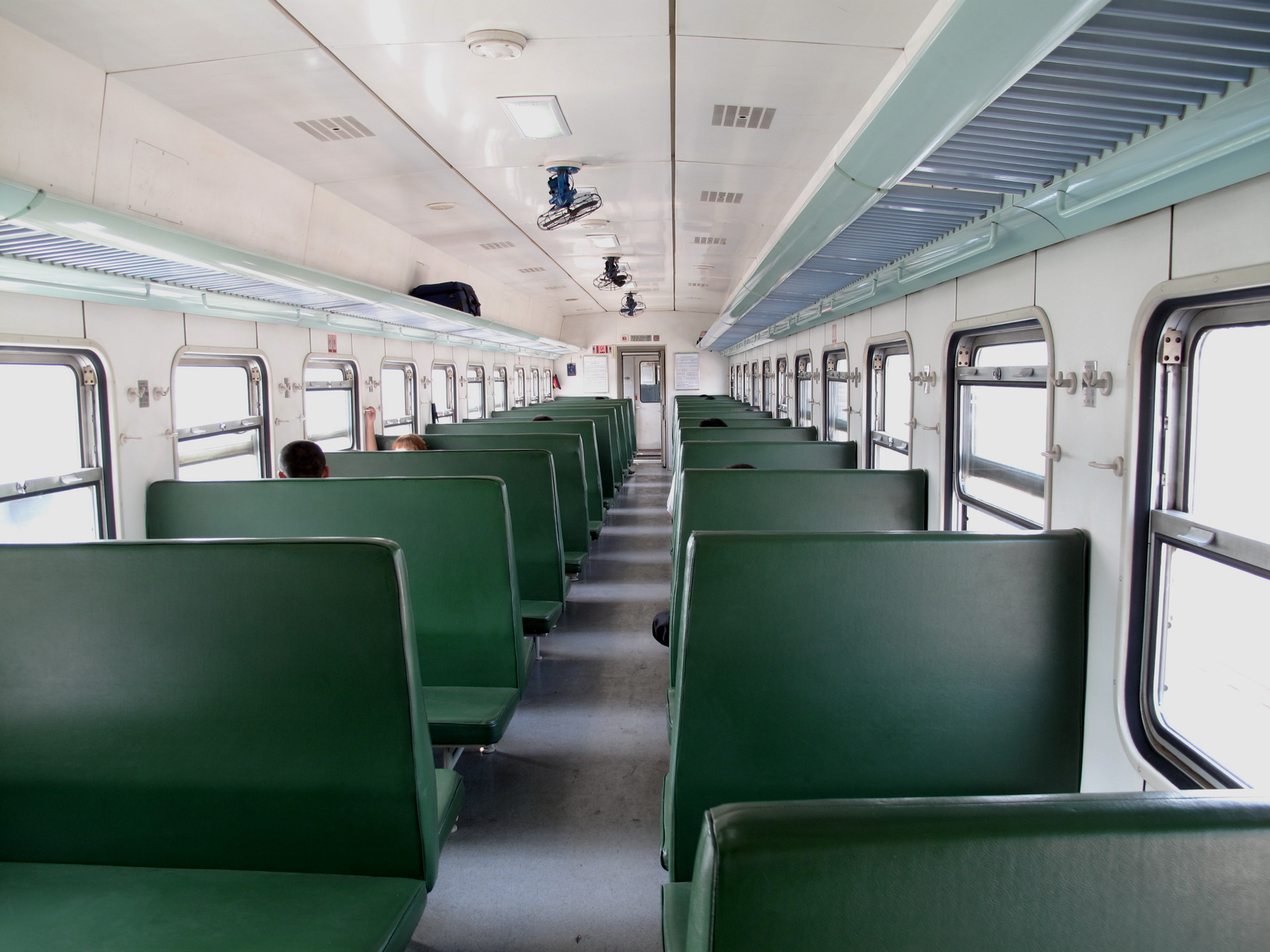
Hard seat (YZ) on non-air-conditioned coaches

- **Deluxe soft sleeper**, with capacity for 20–36, have two-berth compartments with private bathroom and television. Most long-distance trains carry this carriage along with Soft sleeper carriages.
- **Soft sleeper** carriages (RW), with capacity for 36 (50 in double-decker cars (SRW)), have enclosed, lockable compartments with four sleeping berths. The upper berths can be folded up to allow for seating in the lower berths.
- **Hard sleeper** carriages (YW), with capacity for 60–66 (76–80 in double-decker cars (SYW)), have 11 open bays or semi-compartments with six sleeping berths in each. Within each bay, the sleeping berths are stacked three on each side (lower, middle and upper). The lower berths cost the most and the upper berths, the least.
- **Soft seat** carriages (RZ), with capacity for 72–88 (108–110 in double-decker cars (SRZ)), have plush seats and more legroom and are available only on some K, T and Y class trains.
- **Hard seat** carriages (YZ), with capacity for 116–128 (170–180 in double-decker cars (SYZ)), have cushioned but stiff seats and provide the most basic seating option on non-high speed trains (Classes K, T, Z, L, regular fast, regular). On crowded trains, riders with standing room tickets will stand in the aisles of hard seat cars.

Long-distance trains have dining cars (CA).

=== Holidays ===
Demand for tickets increases dramatically during the Chinese New Year and the two Golden Week holiday in early May and October, as many migrant workers and students return home and travelers go on vacation. The Golden Weeks are holidays organized May Day (1 May) and National Day (1 October). Chinese New Year also called the Spring Festival, follows the lunar calendar and is in January or February.

In 2009, the duration of the May holidays was shortened from one week to a long weekend, but holiday traffic remained strong, setting a one-day record of 6.54 million passengers carried over the Chinese rail network on 1 May 2009.

The month-long period before, during and after the Chinese New Year is known as Chunyun or "spring transport" for China's railways. During this period, train service increases to meet the demand from one of the largest annual human migrations in the world. Since railway transport is the cheapest method for long-distance travelers in China, the railway is the most important transport method during the Chunyun period. For example, during the 40 days of the 2007 Chunyun period, it is estimated that 156 million passengers rode trains, which corresponds to 3.9 million passengers per day, compared to the overall average of 2.4 million per day. To make the situation even worse, traffic is highly imbalanced: before the Chinese New Year, passengers mainly travel from the large cities and after the holiday, the traffic reverses. Although hundreds of temporary trains are operated, train tickets are still in short supply. Trains are very crowded during this period, for example; a passenger car with 118 seats may accommodate more than 200 people.

== Freight transport ==
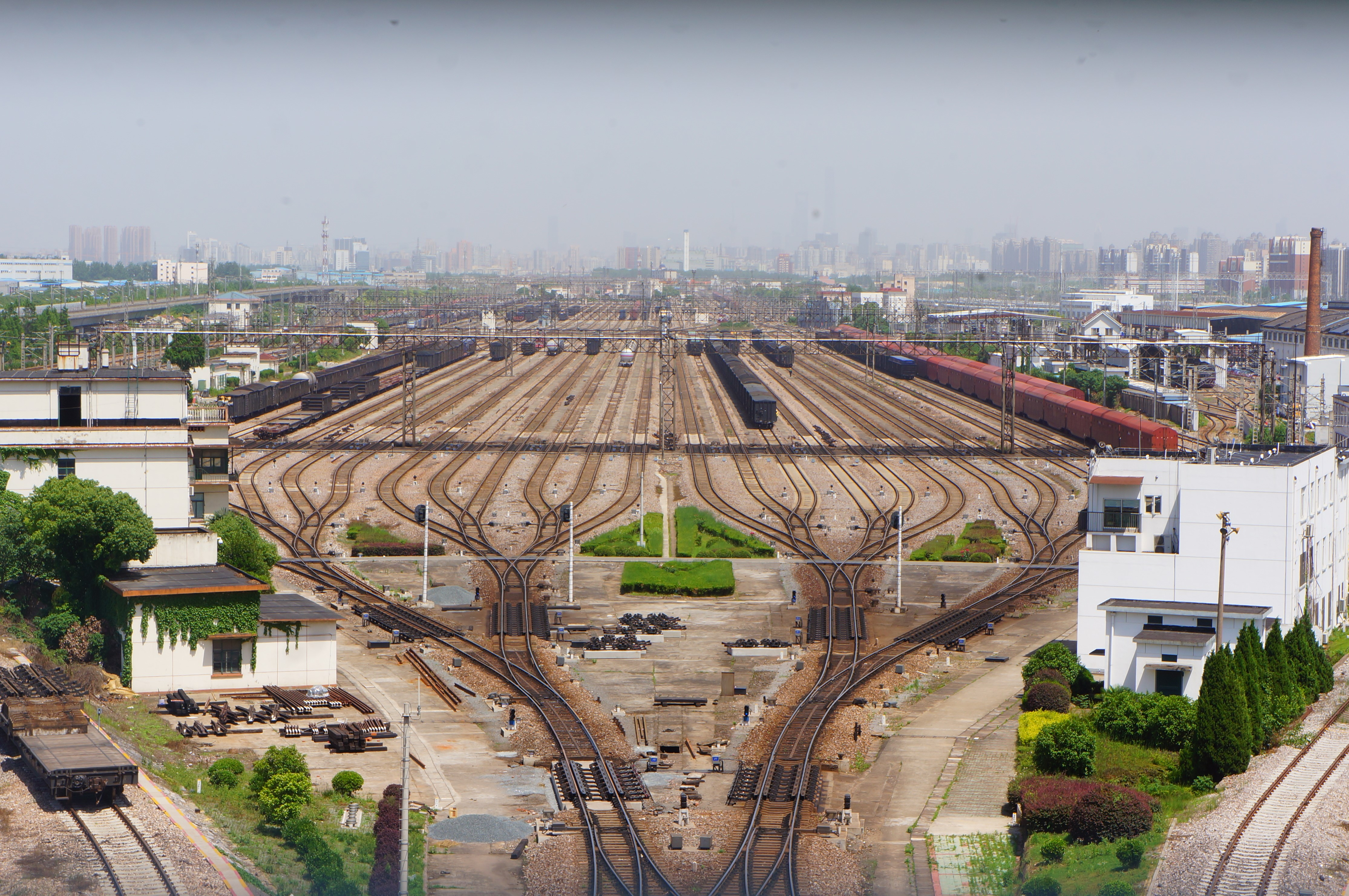
Nanxiang Classification Yard in Shanghai

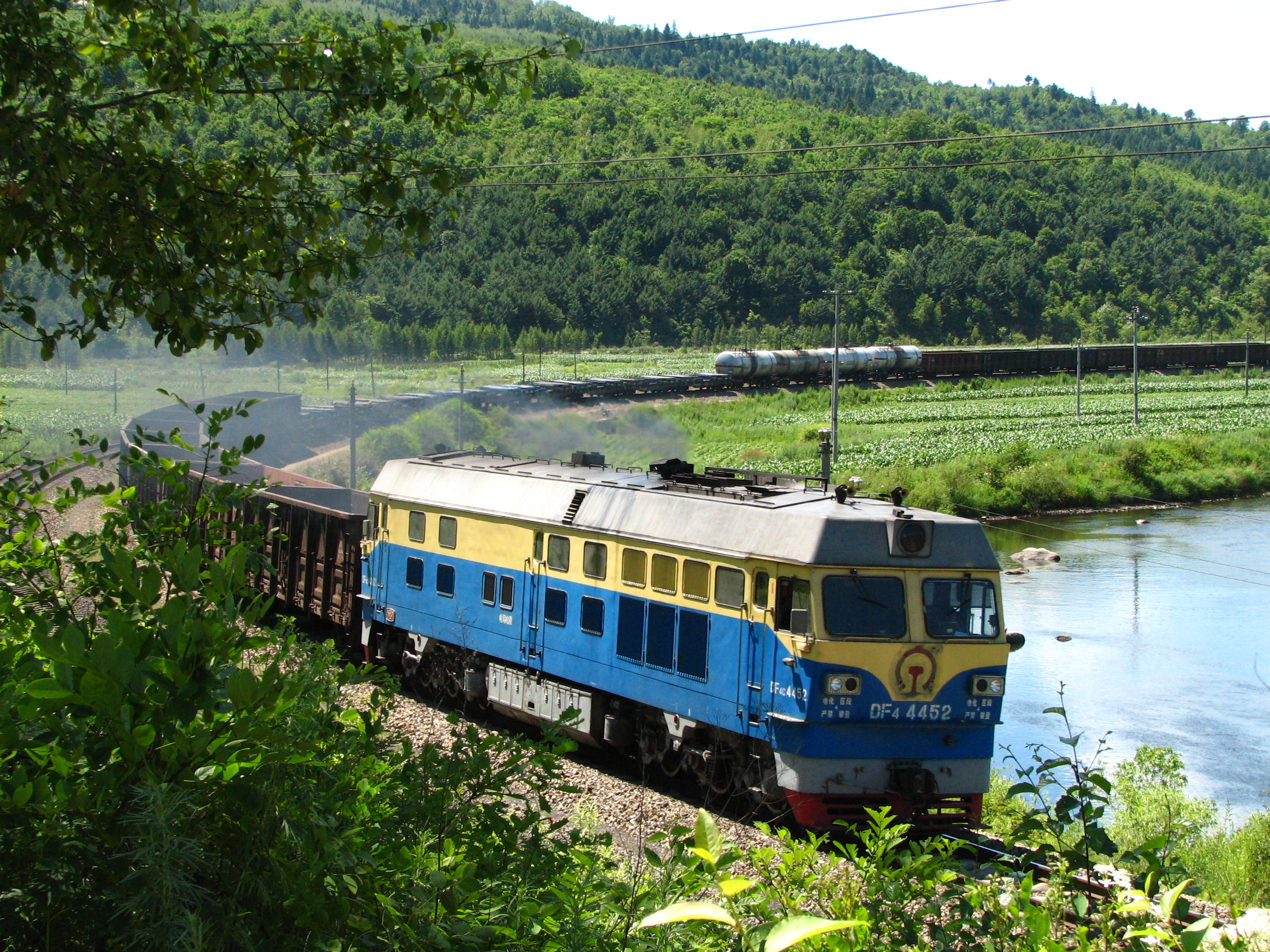
Freight train on the Suihua–Jiamusi Railway in Yichun, Heilongjiang.

Freight trains in China are primarily used to ship bulk cargo. The important cargo is coal, which accounts for more than half of total rail freight tonnage. In 2013, 2.322 billion tonnes of coal were shipped on trains in China, about 58% of the total rail freight tonnage of 3.967 billion. Another one-fifth of rail freight was devoted to ores and minerals, which were 851 million tonnes (21.5%) in 2013. Other major categories of bulk goods include grain (110 million tonnes, 2.77% in 2013) and fertilizer (87 million tonnes, 2.19% in 2013).

Container cargo constitutes a small but growing fraction of about 5% of the total rail traffic. Open wagons are sometimes used for container transport and some bulk goods are nowadays transported in containers, to make intermodal transport more efficient, and to make trains which would otherwise have returned empty carry containerized goods on their return trip.

Despite impressive passenger statistics, freight rail modeshare in China trails other countries like USA, where some 40% of all tonnage is shipped by rail, according to US Federal Railroad Administration or Switzerland where a similar share of ton kilometers of freight is carried by rail. In China, that number is only 8% as of 2016 and 77% for highways out of 43 billion tonnes, but the share of railways is expected to increase due to new environmental regulations in regards to air pollution, which is expected to force millions of trucks off roadways.

Nearly all rail freight in China is used for domestic shipping. International rail cargo totaled 58 million tonnes in 2013, about 1.46% of overall freight tonnage. The four largest rail ports of entry, Manzhouli, Suifenhe, Erenhot, Alashankou and accounted 56 million tonnes or 96.5% of the total.

Cities in the Chinese interior have opened international rail freight routes to promote trade. In 2011, Chongqing began freight service to Duisburg, Germany, via Kazakhstan, Russia and Poland. The route shortened shipping time from five weeks by sea to about two weeks, and costs 80% less than air cargo.

The China-Europe Freight Train (CEFT) operates 80 routes connecting approximately 100 Chinese cities to approximately 200 European cities, as well as many other central Asian and southeast Asian cities. CEFT continued to effectively move freight into Europe during the disruption of the 2022 Russian invasion of Ukraine by developing alternative routes via Azerbaijan, Georgia, and Turkey. CEFT was launched in 2011, but was incorporated into the subsequent Belt and Road Initiative.

== Military transport ==
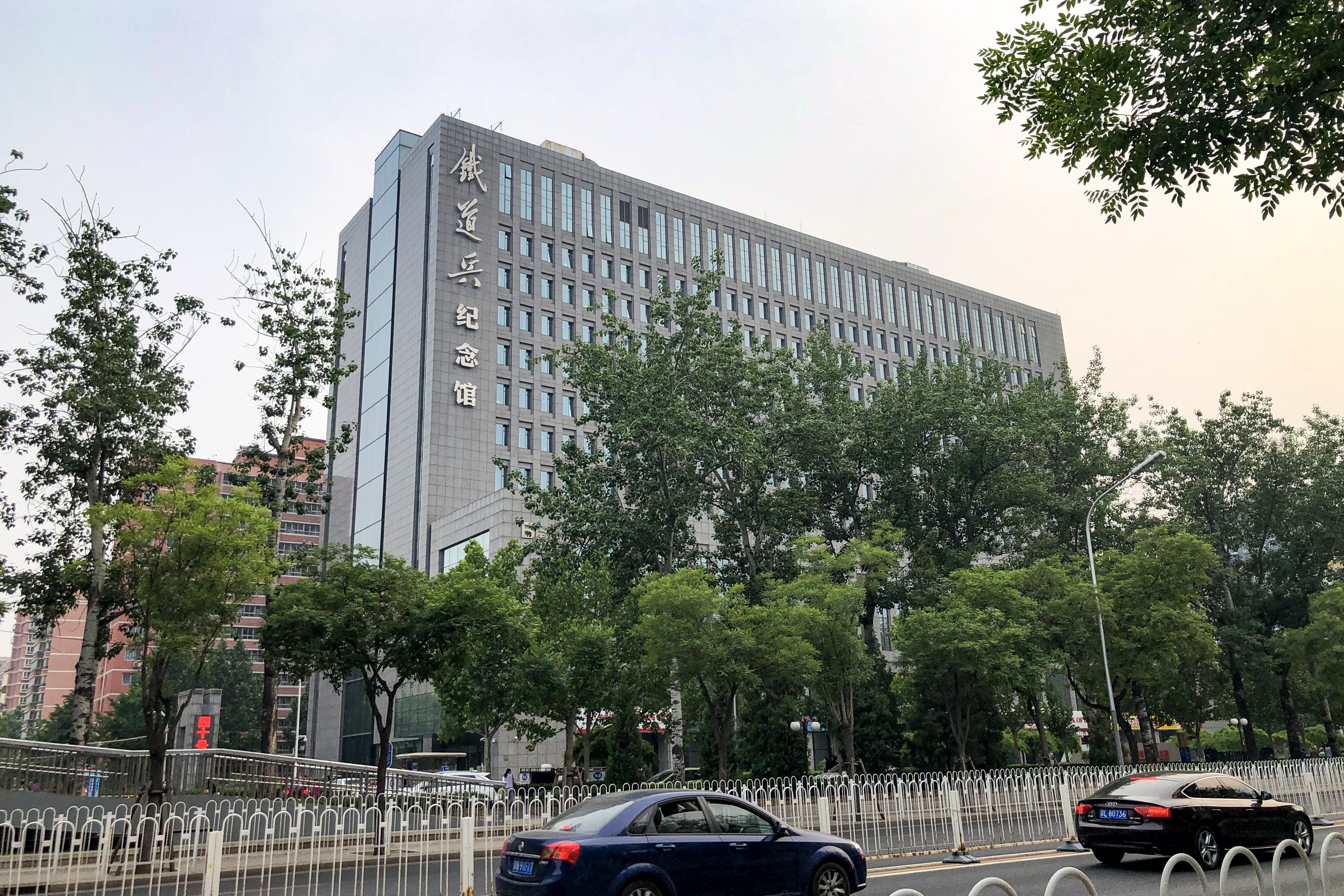
Railway Construction Corps Memorial Hall near the headquarter of CRCC

The People's Liberation Army (PLA) uses the railway system to transport personnel, supplies, conventional and strategic arms. The military used to play a more prominent role in railway development and management. The PLA's Railway Construction Corps, which in the 1950-1970s built many of the railroads in the Southwest, became a civilian company in 1984 and is now China Railway Construction Corporation. For a time during the Cultural Revolution, the entire Railway Ministry was placed under the PLA's command.

== Rolling stock ==
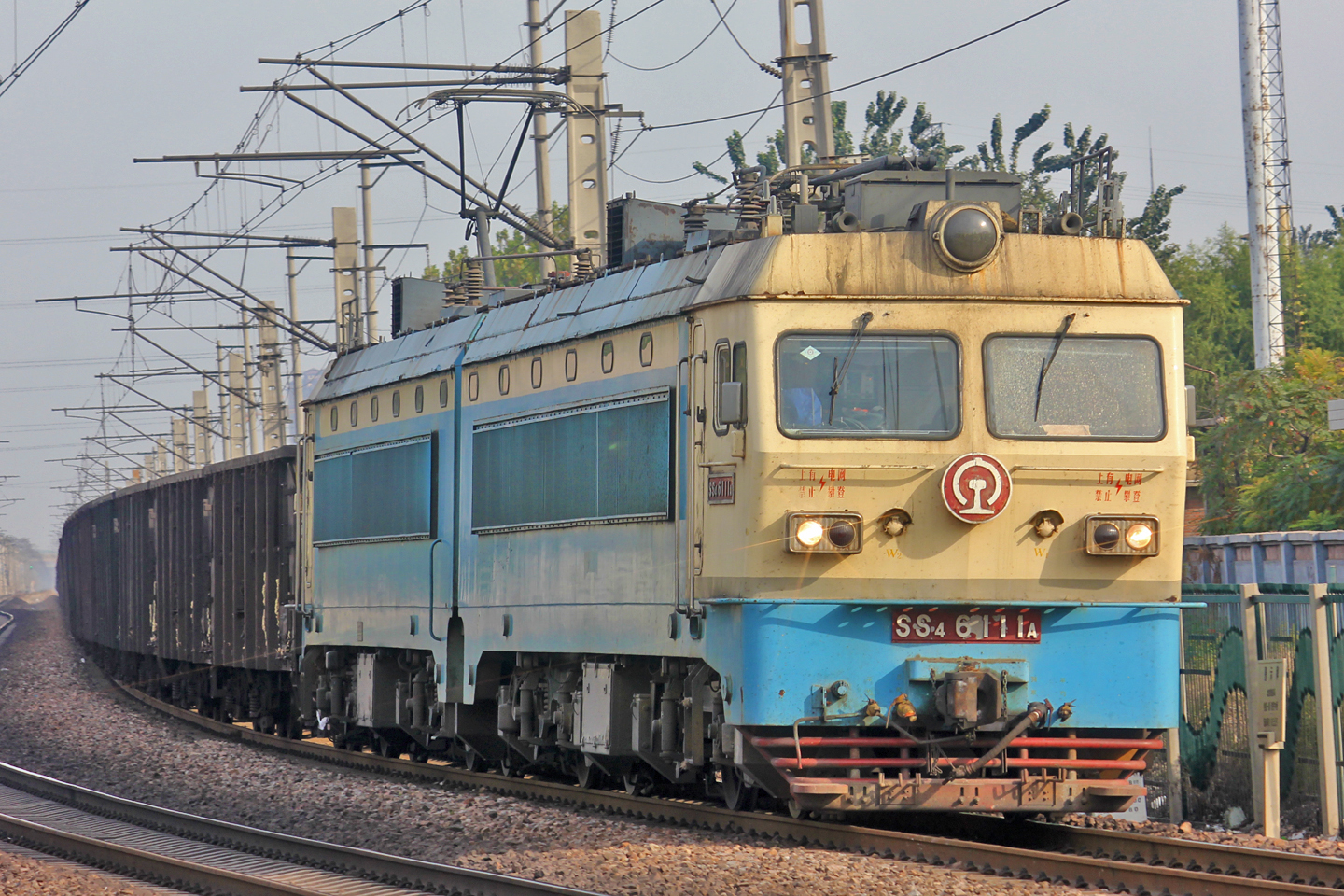
A SS4 electric locomotive pulling coal cars on the Shijiazhuang-Dezhou Railway.

As of 2013, China's rail inventory included 21,100 locomotives, a net increase of 261 from the year before. Electric locomotives were 55.0% of the total, with diesel locomotives accounting nearly all of the remainder. In 2011, there were 19,431 locomotives owned by the national railway system. Another 352 locomotives are owned by local railroads and 604 operated by joint-venture railways.

The inventory in recent times included some 100 steam locomotives, but the last such locomotive, built in 1999, is now in service as a tourist attraction while the others have been retired from commercial service.

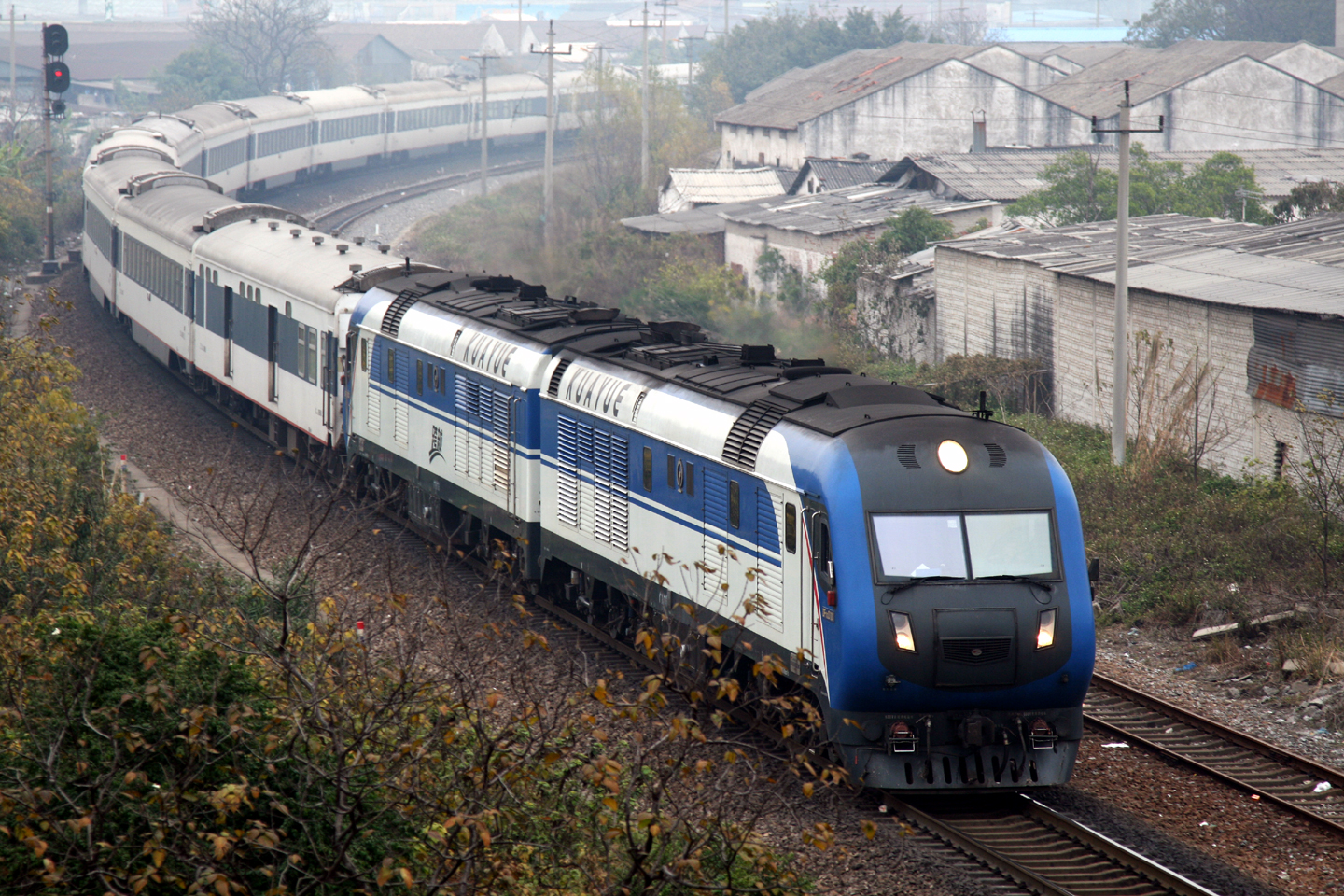
A DF11G diesel locomotive pulling passenger trains on the Guangzhou–Maoming railway in suburban Guangzhou in 2008.

Among the most common types of Chinese locomotives are the DF (Dongfeng or "East Wind") diesel series, the SS (Shaoshan) electric series, and the HX (Hexie or "Harmony") series. In the first decade of the 21st century, China began to import and produce AC/DC-AC transmission electric locomotives; the most numerous of these are the HXD series "Harmony" locomotives for freight loads. Most modern trains, for example for the China Railway High-Speed service, are either imported or produced in China using technology transfer agreements.

In 2013, there were 60,600 passenger cars, 85.9% of which were air conditioned. The Harmony Express electrical multiple units totaled 1,411 sets and 13,696 cars. Freight cars totaled 710,100. In 2011, there were 52,130 passenger coaches and 622,284 freight cars.

=== High speed rolling stock ===
- China Railway High-speed (CRH): CRH1, CRH2, CRH3, CRH5, CRH6, CRH380A, CR400AF, CR400BF, CR300AF, CR300BF
- Zefiro 380
- X 2000
- Blue Arrow
- China Star

== Cross-border linkages ==
China is a member of the International Union of Railways (UIC). The country's UIC code is 33. Chinese railways has adopted and begun to implement the GSM-R wireless rail communications standard. China is also a signatory to the Trans-Asian Railway Network Agreement, an initiative of the UN Economic and Social Commission for Asia and the Pacific to promote the integration of railway networks across Europe and Asia.

Railway connectivity is a major focus of the Belt and Road Initiative. Use of BRI-related rail surged after the COVID-19 pandemic, which had congested air freight and sea shipping, and hampered port access. As of 2024, multiple BRI railway projects were branded as the China Railways Express, which linked approximately 60 Chinese cities to approximately 50 European cities.

=== Current and past links ===
Cross-border passenger train services are available to destinations in:

- Kazakhstan, Mongolia, and Russia. These countries use 1,520 mm (4 ft 11 27/32 in) gauge, so there is a break-of-gauge.
- Hong Kong SAR, Laos, and North Korea. These use standard gauge.
- Vietnam, although Vietnam predominately uses 1,000 mm (3 ft 3 3/8 in) rail gauge, the line running up from Hanoi to the border between China and Vietnam, which is the only line currently receiving international passenger train service from China, is dual-gauged. Therefore, there are no break of gauge problems in the service.

==== Hong Kong ====
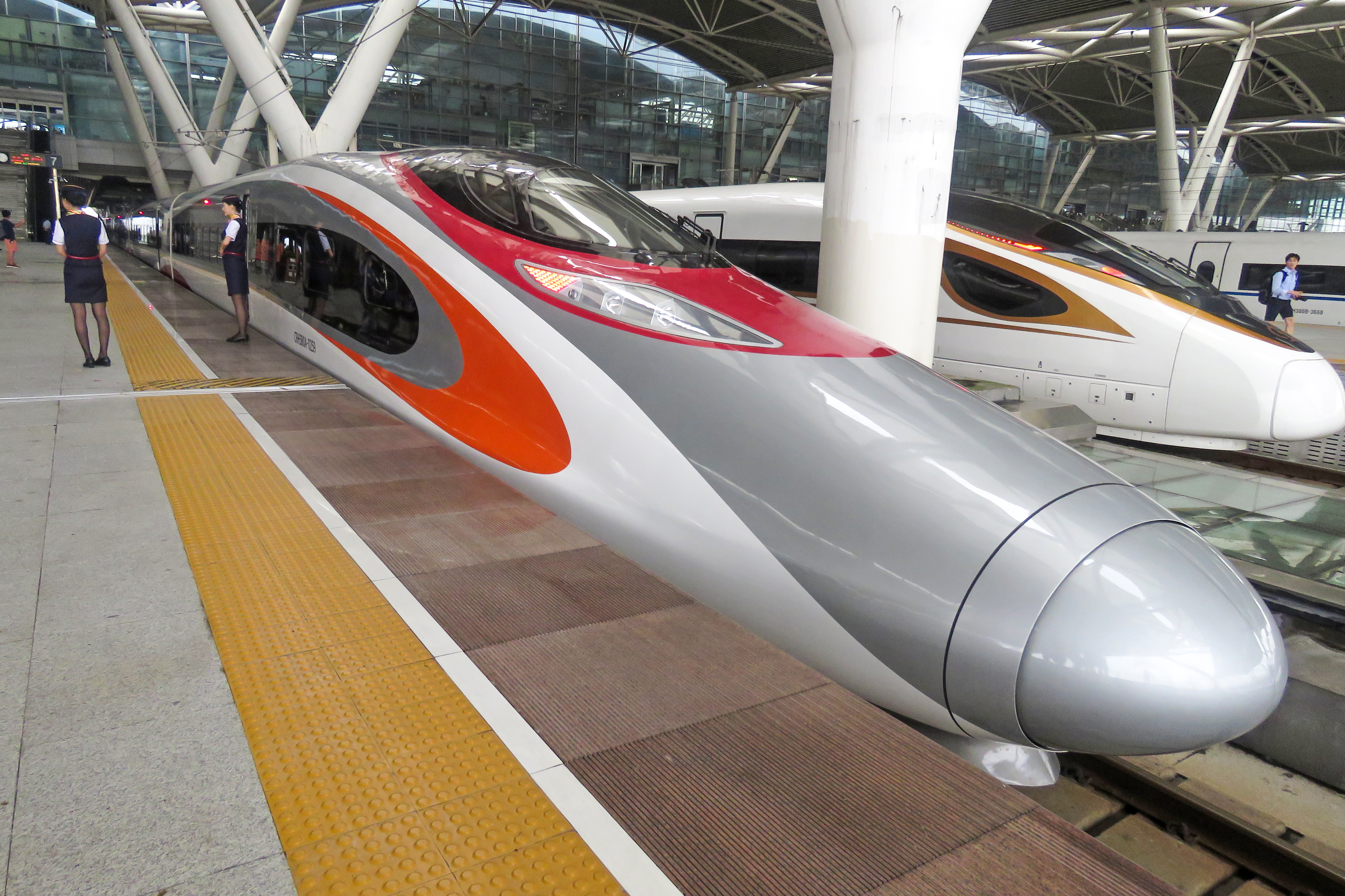
An MTR Vibrant Express train at Guangzhou South railway station

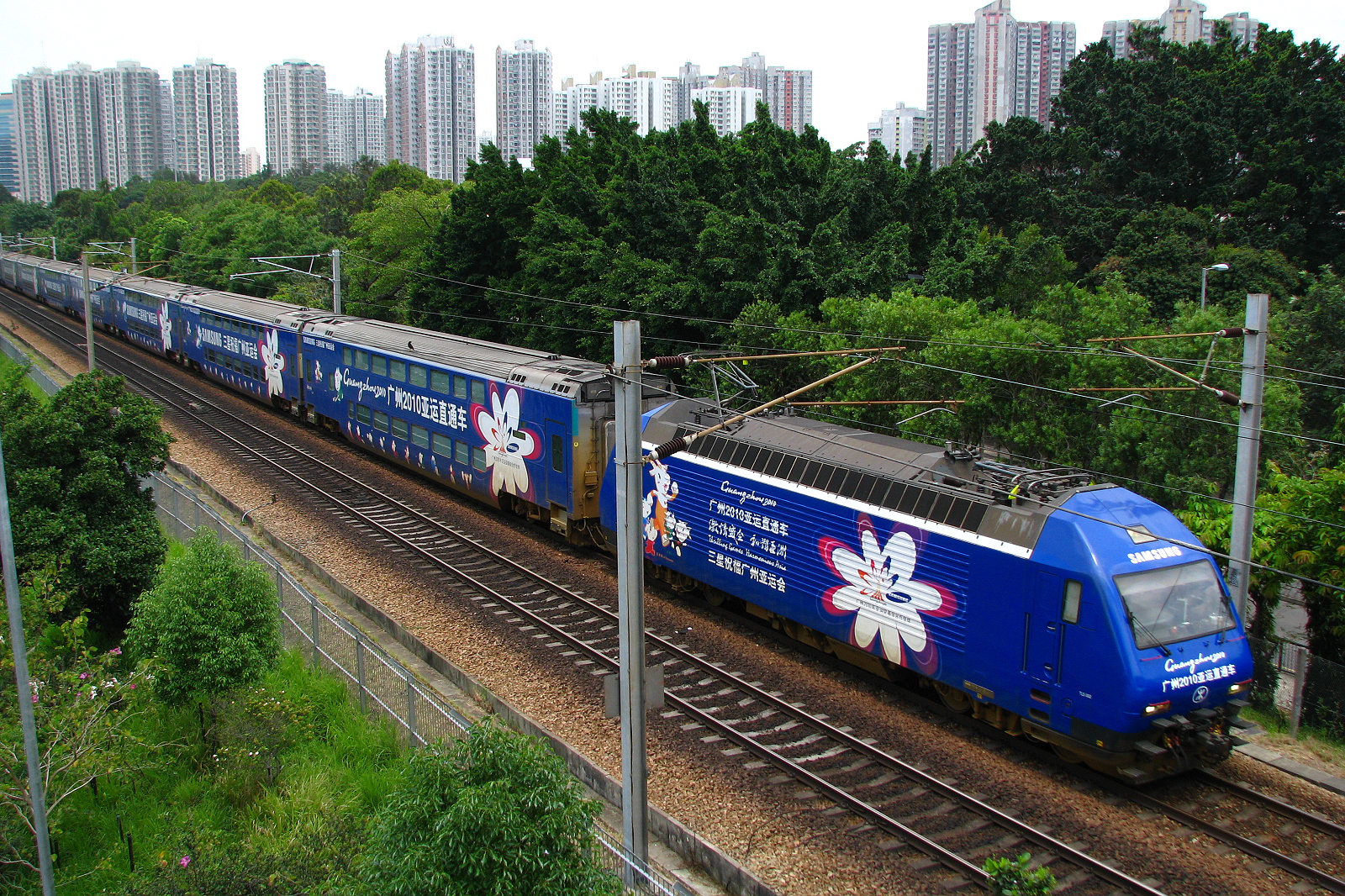
The Guangzhou–Kowloon through train is jointly operated by the Hong Kong MTR and China Rail Corporation.

Train services to Hong Kong terminate at the Hung Hom station in Kowloon. Within Hong Kong the cross-boundary services use the tracks of the East Rail line. There are three through-train routes, Beijing line (to/from Beijing), Shanghai line (to/from Shanghai) and Guangdong line (to/from Zhaoqing and Guangzhou East). An express train service linking Hong Kong West Kowloon and Guangzhou entered service in September 2018. This new express rail line will reduce the train travel time between Hong Kong and Guangzhou from 2 hours to 1 hour.

==== North Korea ====
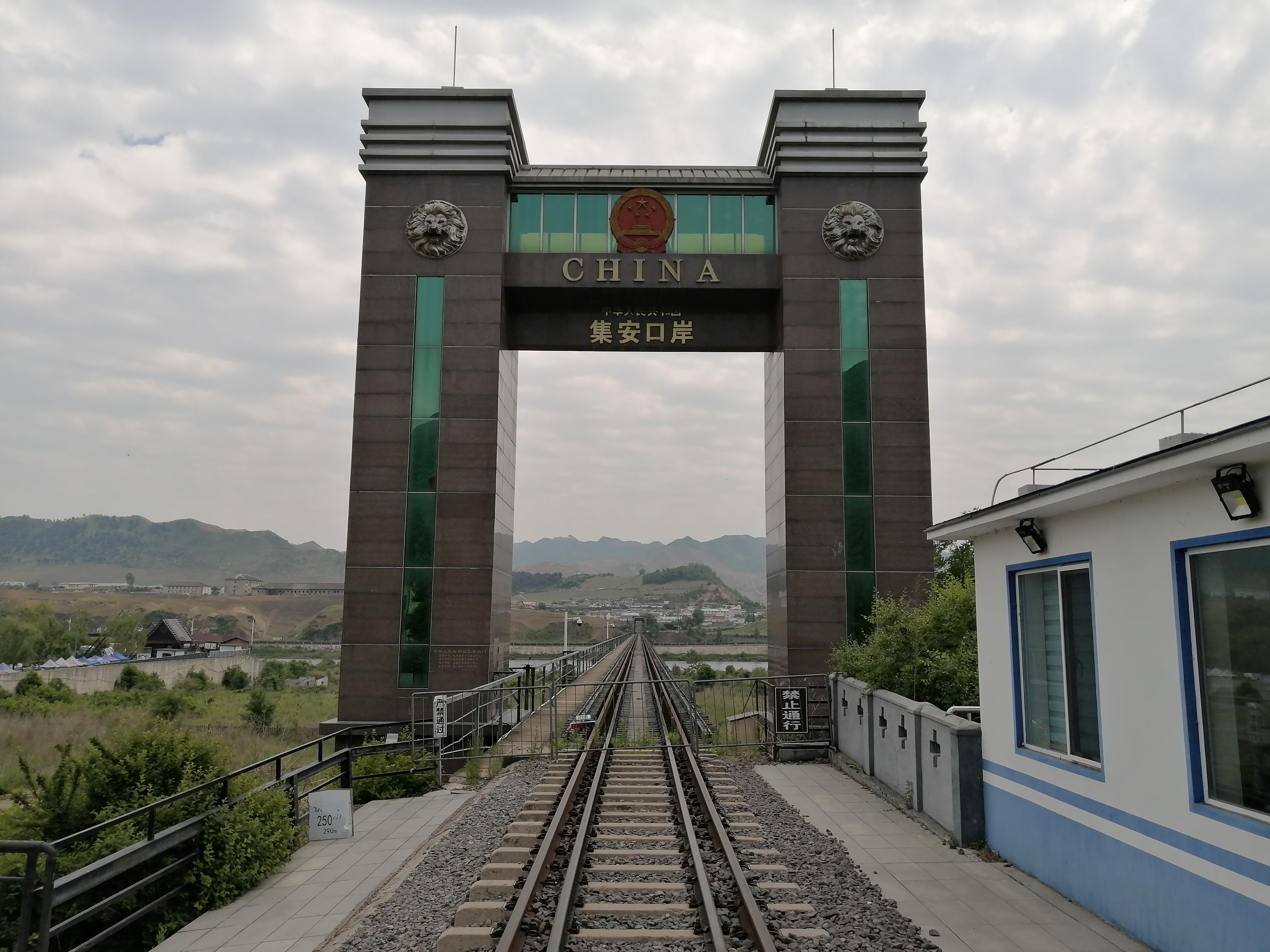
The Ji'an Yalu River Railway Bridge between Ji'an, Jilin and Manpo, Chagang

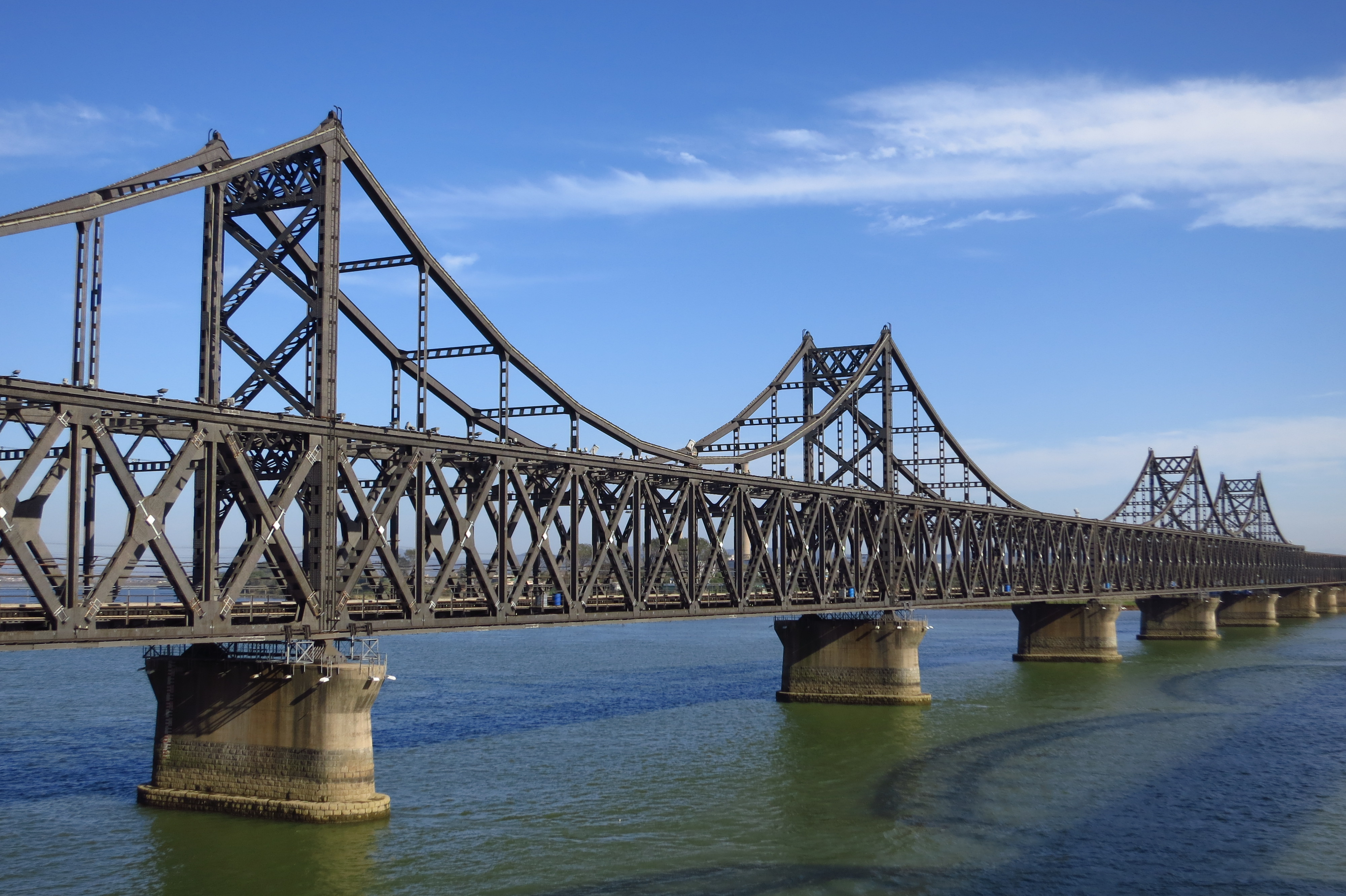
Sino-Korean Friendship Bridge near the mouth of the Yalu River between Dandong, Liaoning and Sinuiju, North Pyongan

There are rail crossings along the border with North Korea at Dandong, Ji'an and Tumen.

Dandong, in Liaoning, is 277 km (172 mi) by regular train and 223 km (139 mi) by CHR south of Shenyang at the mouth of the Yalu River across from Sinuiju in North Korea's North Pyongan Province. This is the most heavily used rail connection between the two countries. Ji'an, upstream on the Yalu in Jilin and 400 km (250 mi) by rail from Siping, connects to Manpo in Chagang Province. Tumen, also in Jilin and 527 km (327 mi) east of Changchun is located across the Tumen River from Namyang, North Hamgyong Province.

There are four weekly trains with hard and soft sleepers from Beijing to Pyongyang, as well as a weekly carriage attached to the Vostok train from Moscow via Harbin, Shenyang and Dandong.

==== Russia ====
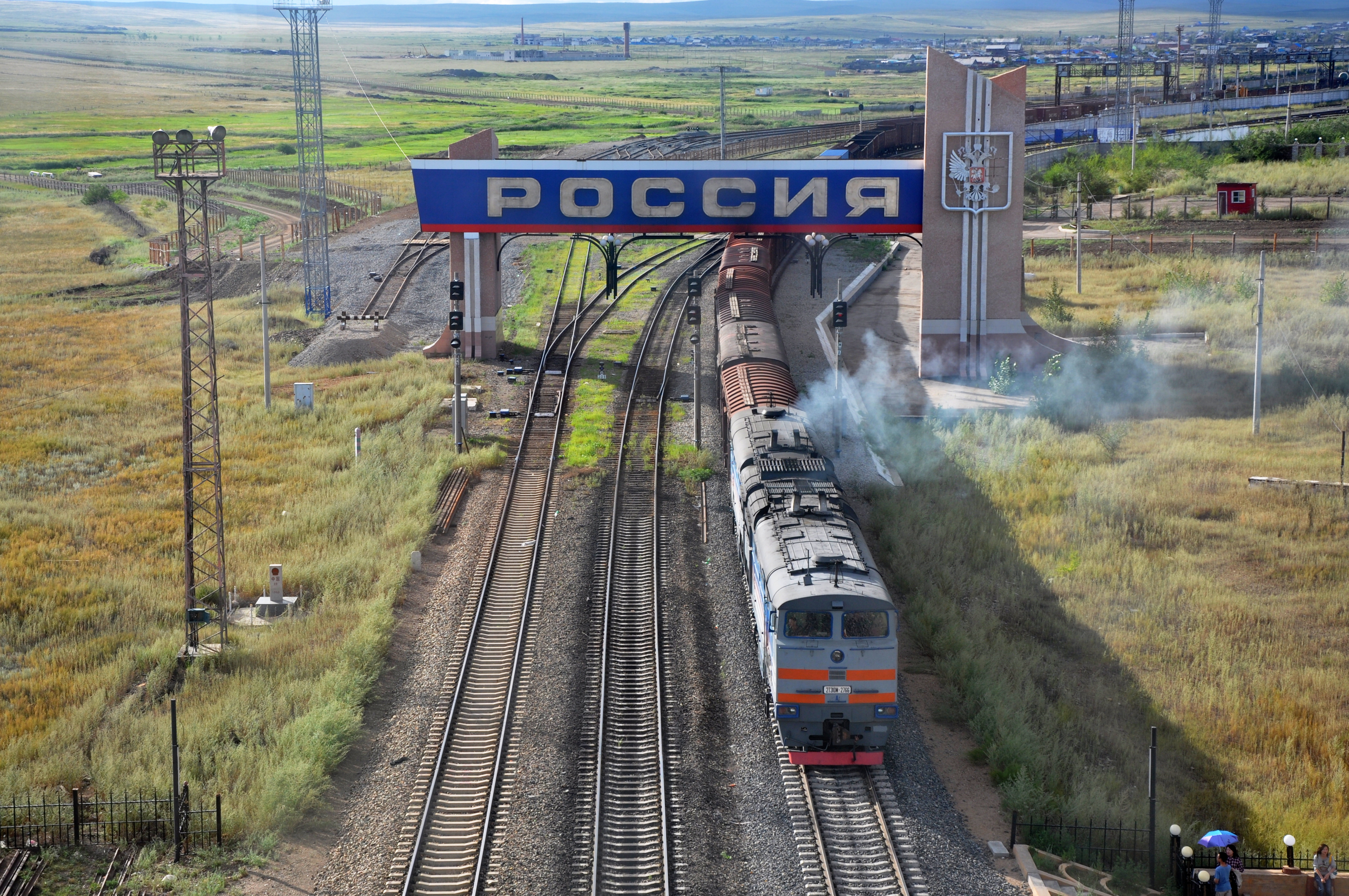
A train leaving Russia and entering China at Manzhouli

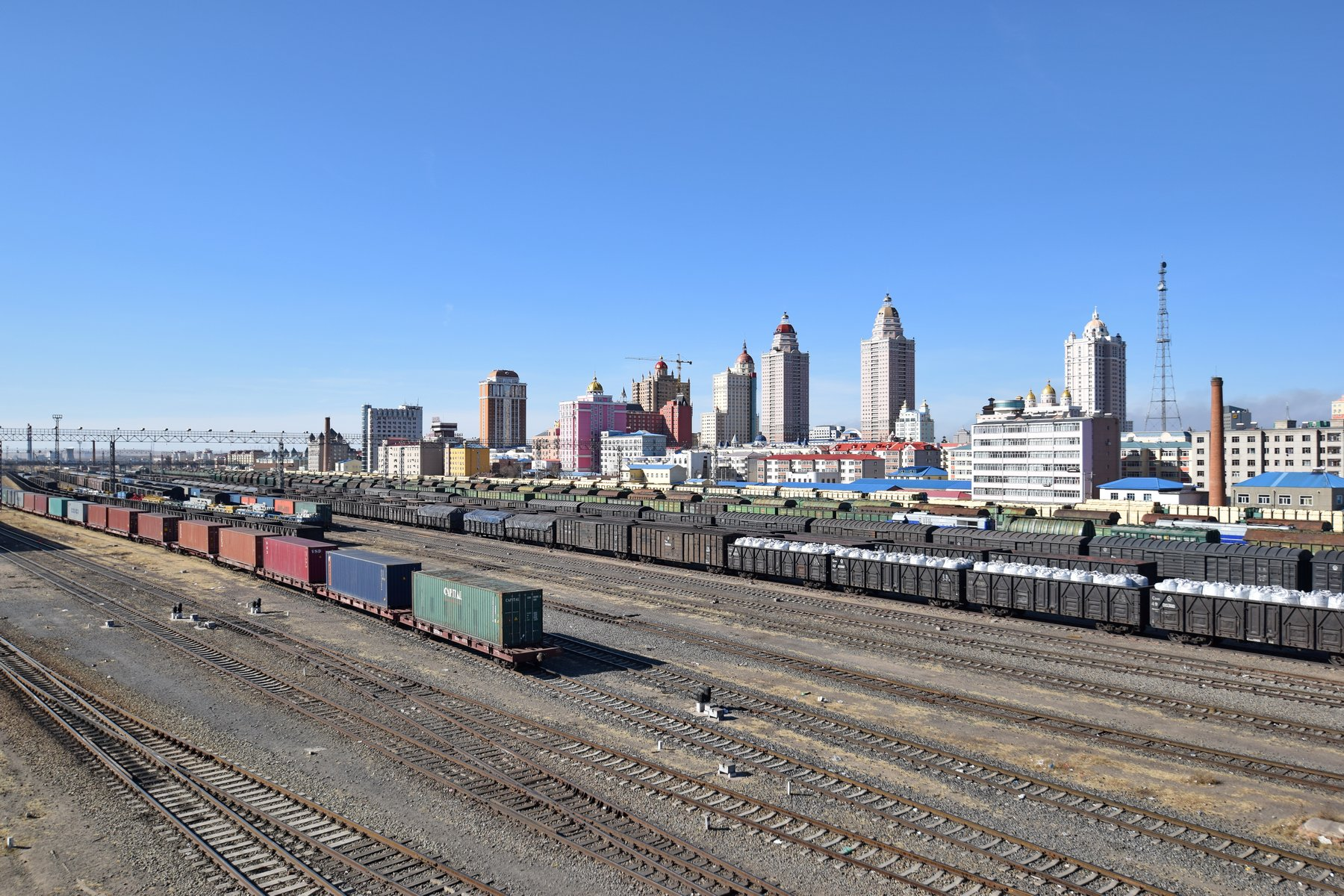
Rail carriages in Manzhouli, the busiest inland port in China

China's three rail crossings into Russia are all located along the eastern section of the border between the two countries.

The crossings at Manzhouli and Suifenhe are at either ends of the Trans-Manchurian Railway, which was a shortcut for the Trans-Siberian Railway built through northeastern China in the early 1900s. Manzhouli, in the Hulunbuir region of northern Inner Mongolia, is China's busiest inland port. It borders Zabaykalsk in Zabaykalsky Krai of Russia's Transbaikal region and handles the bulk of the bilateral freight trade and one of the Beijing-Moscow passenger train routes. Suifenhe, in southern Heilongjiang, borders the town of Pogranichny in Primorsky Krai of the Russian Far East. The rail station on the Russian's side is called Grodekovo. Freight trains from Harbin to Khabarovsk and Vladisvostok pass through Suifenhe. As of November 2008, there was no through passenger service, but one could travel along this route with transfers in Suifenhe, Grodekovo and Ussuriysk.

A third rail connection is located further south at Hunchun in eastern Jilin bordering Kraskino, near the southwest tip of Primorsky Krai. The station on the Russian side, called Makhalino, is located on the Ussuriysk-Khasan-North Korean border line, about 41 km (25 mi) from Khasan. This border crossing began operating in February 2000, and saw only a minor amount of traffic (678 railcars of lumber) over the next two years. The line was closed in 2002–2003, reopened in 2003, but, as of the summer of 2004, it was still reported as seeing little traffic. The line was closed between 2004 and 2013. As of 2011–2012, plans existed for reopening it, primarily to be used for shipping coal and mineral ores from Russia to China; The border crossing reopened, initially in a trial mode, in 2013.

There are two weekly passenger trains in each direction between Beijing and Moscow. The No. 19/20 trains travel 8,961 kilometres (5,568 mi) via Harbin, Manzhouli and the Trans-Siberian Railway. The No. 3/4 trains, take a shorter route of 7,622 kilometres (4,736 mi), through Mongolia via the Trans-Mongolian Railway and has the two-berth deluxe soft sleeper cars. Both journeys are among the longest train services in the world.

==== Mongolia ====
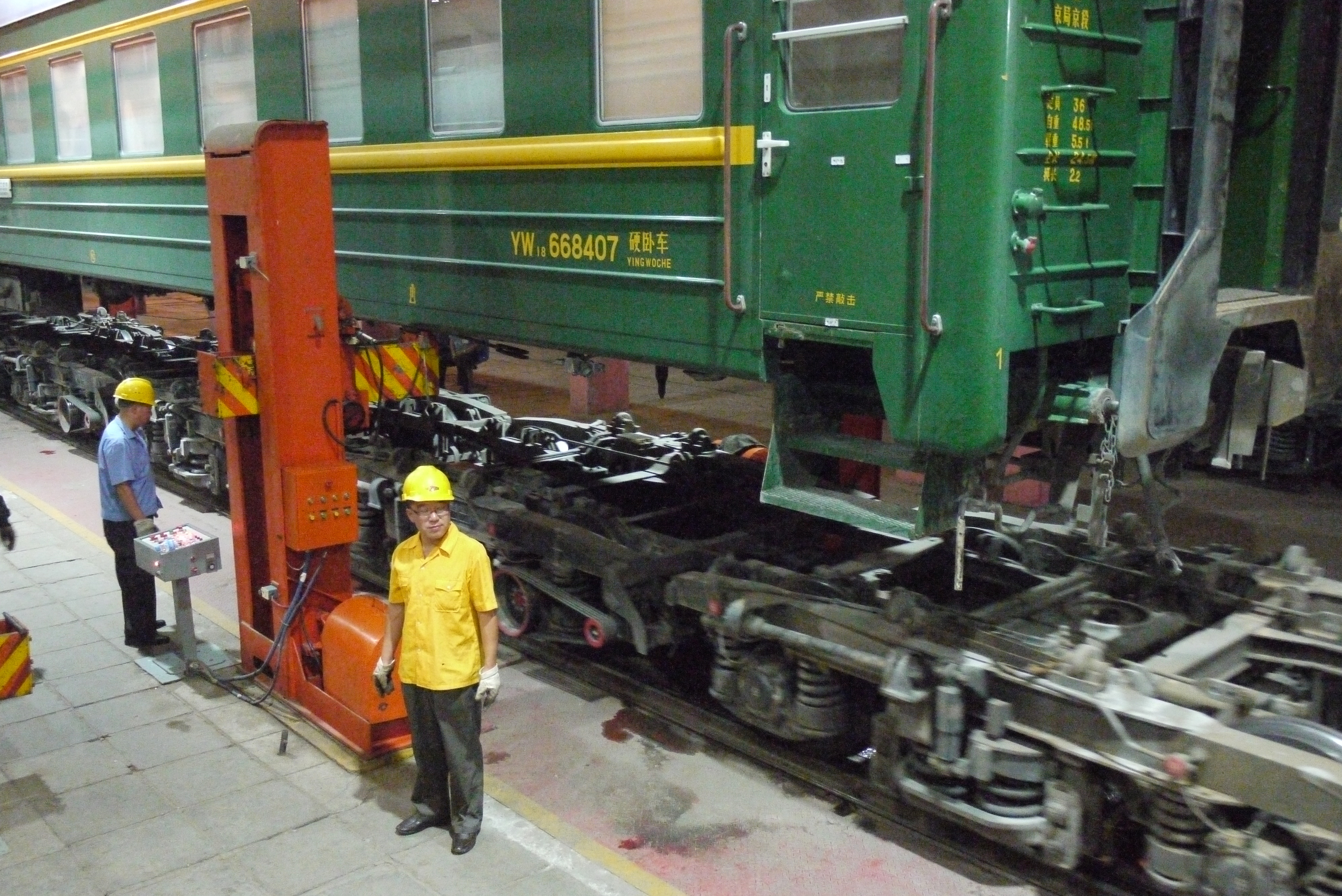
Changing bogies at Erenhot on the Sino-Mongolian border

The lone rail connection with Mongolia's railways is located at Erenhot, in Xilingol League of central Inner Mongolia, which borders Zamyn-Üüd in Mongolia's Dornogovi Province.

There are two trains every week departing from Beijing and Hohhot to Ulaanbaatar, along with five trains per week from Erenhot. As with rail service to Russia, trains from China need to change bogies in Erenhot, since Mongolia uses broad gauge.

==== Kazakhstan ====
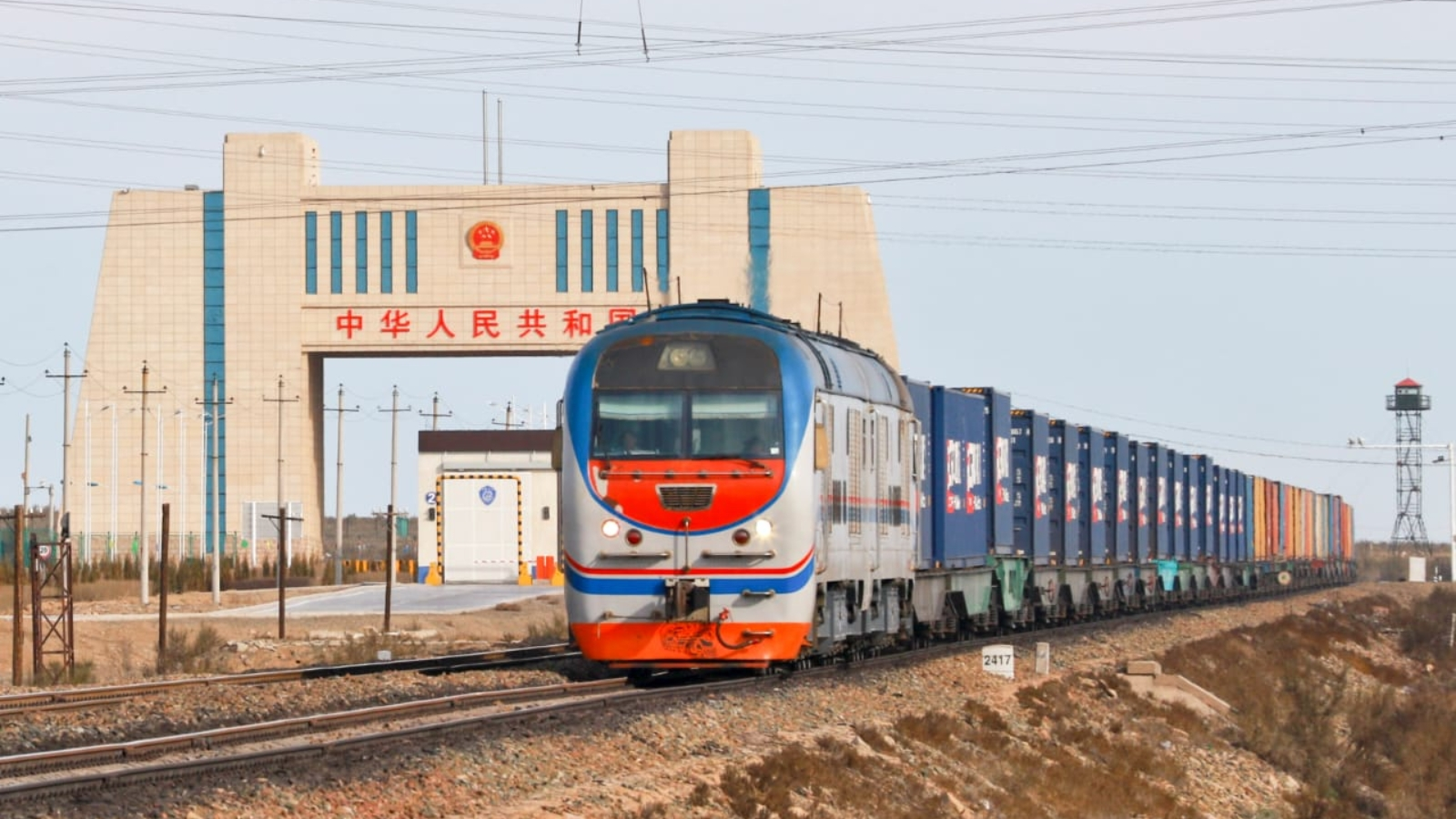
The westernmost point on the Northern Xinjiang Railway at the gate of Alashankou on the Kazakh border.

There are two rail crossings on the China–Kazakhstan border, at Alashankou and Khorgas, both located in the northern part of the Xinjiang. They are the only international rail outlets in western China.

At Alashankou, in the Bortala Mongol Autonomous Prefecture, the Northern Xinjiang railway passes through the Dzungarian Gate to the town of Dostyk, in Kazakhstan's Almaty Province and connects to Qazaqstan Temir Zholy (Kazakhstan's railway system). This crossing, opened in 1990, forms a New Eurasian Land Bridge, allowing trains from Lianyungang on the East China Sea to reach Rotterdam on the North Sea. There are two weekly passenger trains (one Kazakh and one Chinese) from Almaty to Ürümqi, the capital of Xinjiang. There are differing reports on which of the two is more comfortable, and the Chinese train is generally of a higher standard than the Kazakh train.

Khorgas, in the Ili Kazakh Autonomous Prefecture, is located southwest of Alashankou in the Ili Valley. The town on the Kazakh side of the border in Almaty Province, has the same name, Korgas. Here, the Jinghe–Yining–Khorgas railway, a 286-km fork off the main Northern Xinjiang line built in 2009, meets the Zhetigen-Korgas railway, a 239-km branch from the Turkestan–Siberian Railway completed by Kazakhstan in 2011. The Khorgas crossing, opened in December 2012, provides a more direct route from Ürümqi to Almaty.

==== Vietnam ====
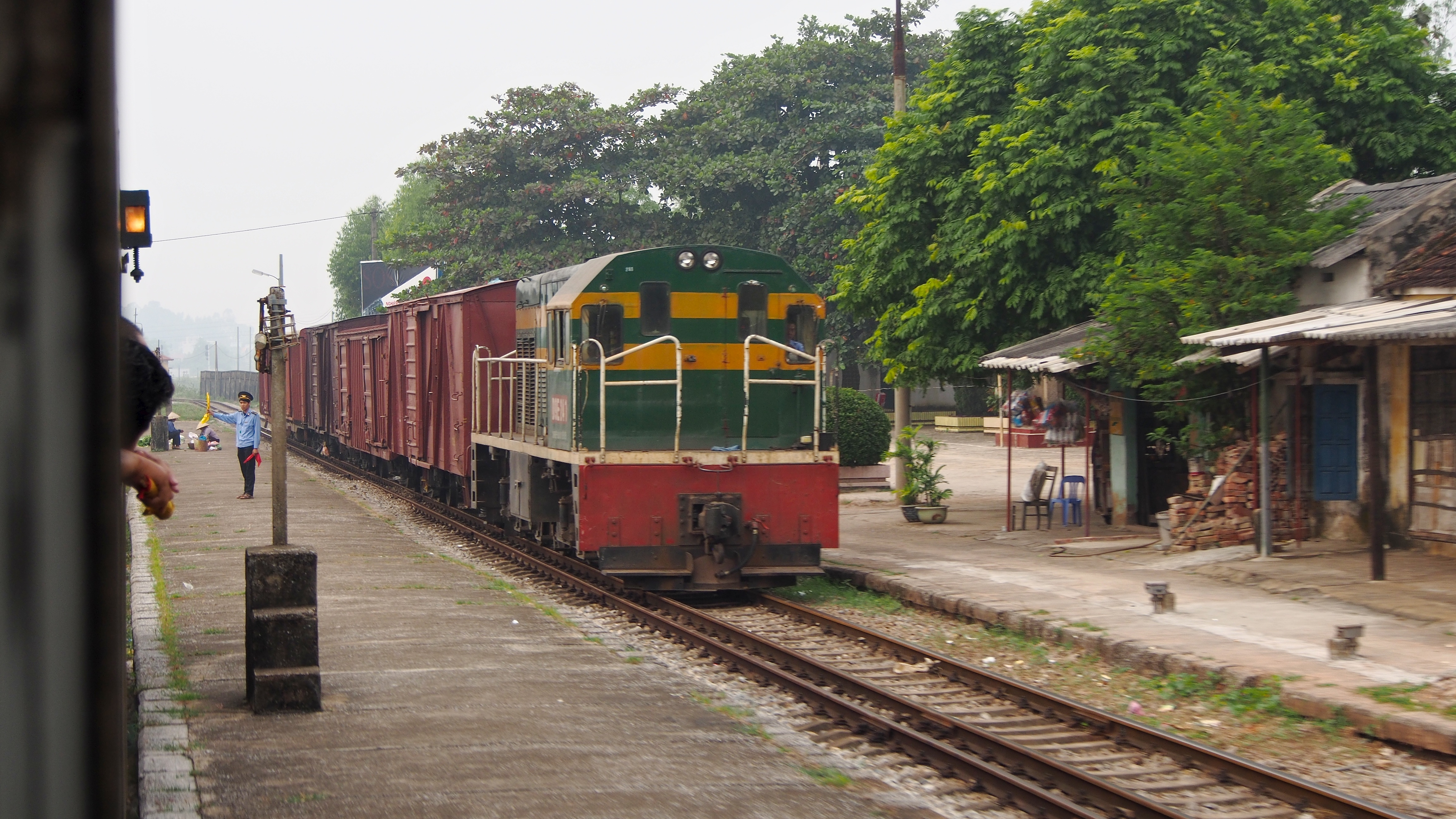
Dual gauge tracks at Đồng Đăng in Vietnam accommodates both metre gauge trains from Hanoi and standard gauge trains from Nanning and other cities in China

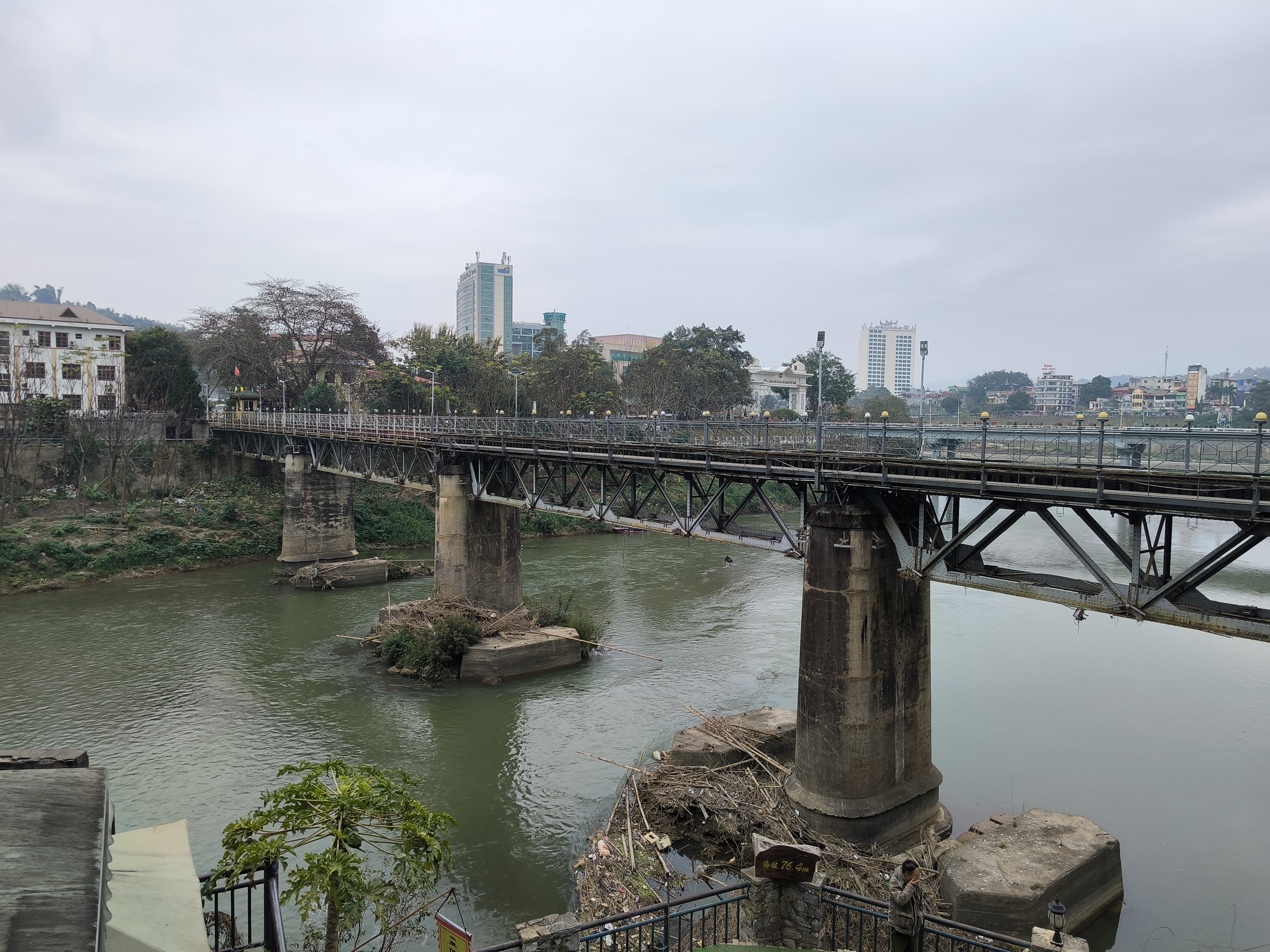
Hekou-Lao Cai Railway Bridge

There are two rail connections between China and Vietnam, at the Friendship Pass and Hekou. At the Friendship Pass on the border between Pingxiang, Guangxi Zhuang Autonomous Region and Đồng Đăng in Vietnam's Lạng Sơn province, the Hunan–Guangxi railway connects to the dual gauge Hanoi-Đồng Đăng Line. The crossing, opened in 1955, has displaced the older Hekou crossing as the primary rail link between the two countries. There are twice weekly trains from Beijing to Hanoi and both traverse the Friendship Pass. The trains consist of a typical T style Chinese express from Beijing to Đồng Đăng. The train may require passengers to detrain in Nanning for 5 hours (especially on the northbound service); a lounge area with reclining chairs is available for Soft Sleeper passengers.

At Hekou, the narrow-gauge Kunming–Hai Phong railway from Kunming, in Yunnan crosses into Vietnam's Lào Cai province. This line, also known as the Yunnan–Vietnam railway, was built by France from 1904 to 1910 though rugged terrain. Cross-border service on this line ceased in late 2000, but freight trains have kept this crossing operational.

==== Laos ====
A railway connecting Kunming to the border with Laos is under construction, which connects to another under construction line linking the border to the Lao capital Vientiane, which already has a real link to Thailand. The line was opened on 3 December 2021 at the 60th anniversary of China–Laos relations.

=== Proposed rail links ===
In recent years, China has been actively exploring and promoting the extension of its railway network to neighboring countries and distant regions including the Russian Far East, Southeast Asia, South Asia, Central Asia, the Middle East and even North America.

==== Macau ====
Macau SAR is currently served by Macau Light Rail Transit completed in 2019. A "Hengqin Branch Line" is planned for the network, which will connect the network directly to Hengqin, part of Zhuhai in Guangdong. The extension line is planned to connect with Guangzhou–Zhuhai intercity railway at the Hengqin station which is part of its first phase extension project that is scheduled to complete in year 2018, and would facilitate seamless cross border rail transit.

Additionally, the city of Guangzhou, Zhongshan, and Zhuhai have proposed the construction of a new "Guangzhou-Zhongshan-Zhuhai-Macau Intercity Railways" which could further connectivity on the west bank of Pearl River Delta.

==== Russian Far East ====
In November 2008, the transport ministries of Russia and China signed an agreement to build one more link between the railway systems of the two countries. One project involves the Tongjiang-Nizhneleninskoye railway bridge across the Heilongjiang (Amur) River, connecting Tongjiang in Heilongjiang with Nizhneleninskoye, a village in Russia's Jewish Autonomous Oblast. The project construction began in 2014 and was estimated to be complete in 2016, however the project had been halted due to funding problems and a construction delay on the Russian side. Additional funding had been injected to the project in 2017 which resolved the funding problem, with the project then estimated to be complete in year 2018. After further delays, the project was finally completed in August 2021.

Additionally, a high speed rail link between Hunchun and Vladivostok have been proposed and discussed.

==== Mongolia ====
In October 2014, the Mongolian parliament approved two standard gauge cross-border railways to China. One line would run 240 kilometres (150 mi) from the Tavan Tolgoi coalfields of Ömnögovi Province to the border at Gashuun Suukhait and cross into China at Ganqimaodu in Urad Middle Banner, part of Inner Mongolia's Bayan Nur Municipality. The other would run from central Mongolia to Bichigt in Sükhbaatar Province and cross into China at Zhuengadabuqi of East Ujimqin Banner, under Inner Mongolia's Xilingol League.

==== Central Asia ====
Since 1997, the governments of China, Kyrgyzstan and Uzbekistan have discussed the building of a 476 kilometres (296 mi) railway across the Tian Shan mountains from Kashgar in the western Tarim Basin of the Xinjiang to the Ferghana Valley via southern Kyrgyzstan. In March 2013, the China Road and Bridge Corp., an engineering firm, submitted a feasibility study to the Kyrgyz government, which found the project to be too expensive. In December 2013, Kyrgyz president Almazbek Atambayev expressed his preference for an alternative line that would connect the northern and southern halves of the country.

On 5 May 2014, the Export-Import Bank of China lent Uzbekistan $350 million for the construction of a railway through the Kamchik Pass that would connect the Fergana Valley with the rest of Uzbekistan. On 12 May 2014, China's paramount leader, Xi Jinping, and Turkmenistan's president, Gurbanguly Berdymukhamedov, signed a declaration to study the possibility of inviting Chinese companies to build a cross-border railway linking the two countries. On 22 May 2014, the Foreign Minister of Kyrgyzstan reportedly suggested inviting China to join in another regional railway project linking Russia, Central Asian states and the Persian Gulf.

==== Nepal ====
China and Nepal signed a series of agreements including a railway link connecting Kathmandu to China's railway network in 2018. The China–Nepal Railway will connect Kathmandu and Shigatse, Tibet. Survey of the Kerung-Kathmandu section will be completed by early 2019, and construction is expected to be completed in six years. The construction is in progress as of September, 2023.

==== Pakistan ====
Since 2007, Chinese and Pakistani authorities have explored the possibility of building the Khunjerab Railway, which would cross the Karakorum Mountains and connect Kashgar with Havelian in the Abbottabad District of northern Pakistan. In June 2013, the Pakistani government indicated that the proposed railway could be extended to the Port of Gwadar on the Arabian Sea. As of February 2014, however, Chinese rail experts said the railway was unlikely to be built in the near term.

==== India ====
Indian and Chinese rail authorities have on several occasions expressed interest in initiating a high-speed rail link that would link Kolkata with Kunming, China via Myanmar. The rail link would use the under construction railway from Manipur, India to Myanmar and the Dali–Ruili railway under construction in western Yunnan Province.

== Longest train journeys ==
Some of the world's longest train journeys by distance travel through China. Beijing-Moscow trains via Harbin (No. 19-20, 8984 km, 144 hours) and Ulan Bator (No. 3-4, 7826 km, 131 hours) are respectively the second and third longest regularly scheduled passenger trains in the world. Only the Moscow-Vladivostok train (9259 km, 178 hours) is longer. Within China, the longest passenger train services are the Z264-Z265 Guangzhou-Lhasa (4980 km, 54 1/2 hours), T206/3-T204/5 Shanghai-Yining (4742 km, 55 2/3 hours), Z136/7-Z138/5 Guangzhou-Ürümqi (4684 km, 49 1/2 hours) and K1121 Harbin-Haikou (4458 km, 65 3/4 hours). In addition, the longest train journey in China by time is K2288/2285 from Changchun to Kunming, with a duration of 68 hours.

The G/403/405 Beijing West – Kunming South train (2760 km, 10 3/4 hours), became the longest high-speed rail service in the world.

The world's longest freight rail service runs from Yiwu, Zhejiang in eastern China to Madrid, Spain, a journey of 13,000 km (8,100 mi) over three weeks.

== See also ==
- List of railway lines in China
- Narrow-gauge railways in China
- Urban rail transit in China
- Transport in China
- Rail transport in Taiwan
- Rail transport in Tibet
- Rail transport in Hong Kong
- Railways in Jiangsu

== Notes ==
- a. There is a significant discrepancy in the total length of China's railways reported by China Statistical Yearbook (120,970 km (75,170 mi) at year end 2015) and the CIA Factbook (191,270 km (118,850 mi) in 2014). The CIA Factbook figure is based on "the total length of the railway network and of its component parts." The Statistical Yearbook figure includes "the total length of the trunk line for passenger and freight transportation in full operation or temporary operation" and measures the actual route distance between the midpoints of railway stations. Any double-tracked route or route with a return track of shorter distance is counted using the length of the original route. The length of any return tracks, other tracks within stations, maintenance and service tracks (such as those used to turn trains around), tracks of fork lines, special purpose lines and non-revenue connecting lines are excluded. The Statistical Yearbook provides cross-year and cross-regional breakdowns of railway length and its figures are presented in China railway articles.
