= Green train =

Green train may refer to:

- the Swedish Gröna tåget project, involving a modified Regina (train) passenger train
- the British Rail Class 172, a British passenger train promoted as "green train"
- the Green-skinned trains, rail service in some communist countries
