= Classic rail in China =

Conventional passenger rail system

China Railway Classic Rail

Overview
- Parent company: China Railway
- Headquarters: Beijing, China
- Locale: People's Republic of China
- Dates of operation: 1949–present

Technical
- Track gauge: 1,435 mm (4 ft 8 1/2 in) Standard gauge
- Electrification: 25 kV 50 Hz AC overhead catenary (most lines); No electrification (some remote lines)
- Length: 120,000 km

Other
- Website: https://www.12306.cn/index/ (Chinese) https://www.12306.cn/en/index.html (English)

The China Railway Classic Rail network (Chinese: 普速铁路; pinyin: Pǔ sù tiělù), also known as conventional rail, (Note: "Conventional rail" term used in China to distinguish Classic Rail services from high-speed rail services while in the United States, Canada, Australia, New Zealand refers to both heavy-duty main line/branch line freight rail and passenger rail excluding high-speed rail services (commuter, regional, intercity) and nationally/internationally operated.) forms the backbone of China Railway's passenger railway system alongside the high-speed rail (HSR) network. These traditional rail services use railway lines that operate at speeds below 160 km/h (99 mph) and serve a dual role in transporting both passengers and freight. Unlike the high-speed China Railway High-speed (CRH) services, which primarily use dedicated electrified tracks, Classic Rail consists of older lines that may be single or double-tracked, with varying degrees of electrification.

Historically, all Classic Rail trains (Chinese: 普速列车; pinyin: Pǔ sù lièchē) were olive-green, leading to the nickname "green train" (Chinese: 绿皮火车; pinyin: Lǜ pí huǒche) to be used by laypeople. Since 2014, most Classic Rail trains that had other colours (white, red, blue) have been repainted olive-green. Classic Rail trains are also sometimes referred to as "slow trains" in English.

Classic Rail trains have significantly lower ticket prices compared to CRH trains and are a popular choice with travellers on a budget. Smoking is usually permitted in designated areas between train coaches on these trains, although a few Classic Rail routes have banned smoking onboard.

Despite the rise of high-speed services, Classic Rail remains vital for freight transport and rural connectivity. Many remote towns rely exclusively on conventional trains for daily commuting, agricultural transport, and long-distance freight, ensuring economic inclusion for areas not served by CRH lines.

== Types of Classic Rail trains ==
=== Current types ===
==== D ("Dongche", 动车; Electric Multiple Units) ====
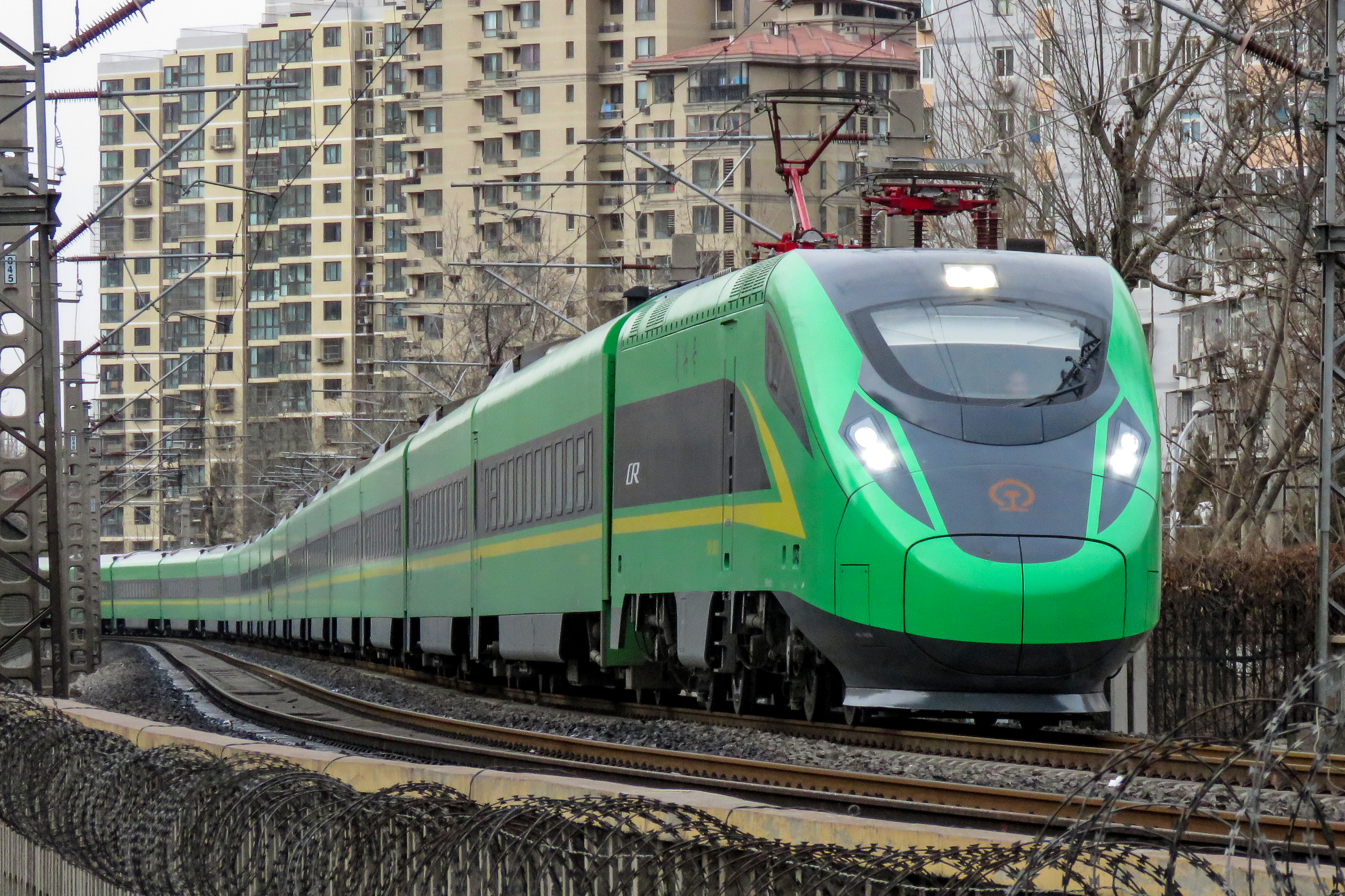
A CR200J in service on a Classic Rail line.

The 'D' trains currently operating on China's classic railway lines, unlike those running on high-speed rail, have an operational speed of 160 km/h rather than 200–250 km/h. They feature passenger car interiors largely similar to high-speed trains, along with newly designed second-class sleeper interiors and first-class sleepers whose design is adapted from high-speed sleeper trains.

These D-series trains on classic railways are designed to replace the existing Z-series trains and may potentially replace the T-series trains in the future.

D-series trains on classic railways are operated by the CR200J electric multiple units, which utilize a centralized power configuration.

==== Z ("Zhida", 直达; Non-Stop Express) ====
'Z' trains, though their name in Chinese (Chinese: 直达; pinyin: Zhídá) technically implies a "non-stop" overnight train, some of these trains have several stops between the two stations. The majority have both soft sleepers and hard sleepers, while some Z trains have only soft sleepers. The top speed is 160 km/h. It uses the numbers Z1-Z9998 without regard to the number of railway bureaus entered.

This series became available after the fifth rise in speed of the railway on April 18, 2004. Early on (2004–2006), all but one of the Z-series trains had either Beijing or Beijing West station as their destination or origin. As of 2009, Z-series trains also operated along the Yangtze Valley as well, providing overnight service from Wuhan to Shanghai, Hangzhou, Ningbo and Shenzhen.

Z-series trains are typically served by the 25T train coaches, which have a top speed of 160 km/h.

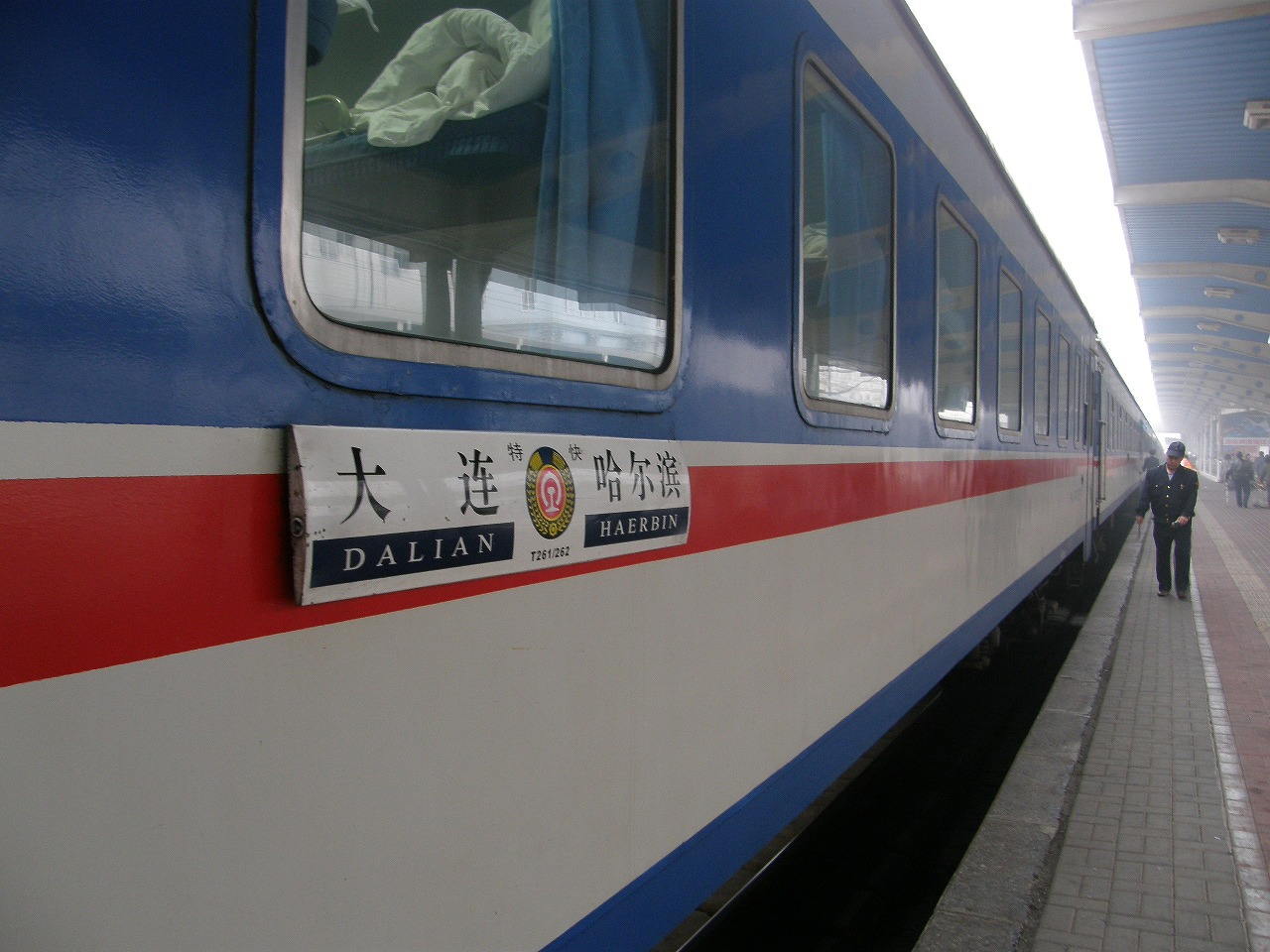
An express train running between Harbin and Dalian

==== T ("Tekuai", 特快; Express) ====
This series of trains have a limited number of stops along their routes, only in major cities, or in some instances stops for switching the driver or locomotive. The top speed is 140 km/h. T1–T4998 for the trains running through two or more railway bureaus, T5001–T9998 for the trains running within one railway bureau. The standard pronunciation on the railway system is "Te"(特) in Chinese.

T-series trains are typically served by the 25K train coaches, which have a top speed of 140 km/h.

==== K ("Kuaisu", 快速; Fast) ====
This series of trains stop at more stations than T-series. The top speed is 120 km/h. The standard pronunciation on the railway system is "Kuai"(快) in Chinese. K1–K6998 are used for the trains that run in more than one railway bureau, while K7001 to K9998 will be used for the trains that run in only one railway bureau.

After April 18, 2004, N-series trains, which represent fast trains travelling exclusively within one railway bureau, were derived from K-series. Then all K-series trains travel on lines operated by more than one railway bureau. After April 1, 2009, N-series was re-merged to K-series after April 1, 2009.

K-series trains are typically served by the 25G train coaches, which have a top speed of 120 km/h.

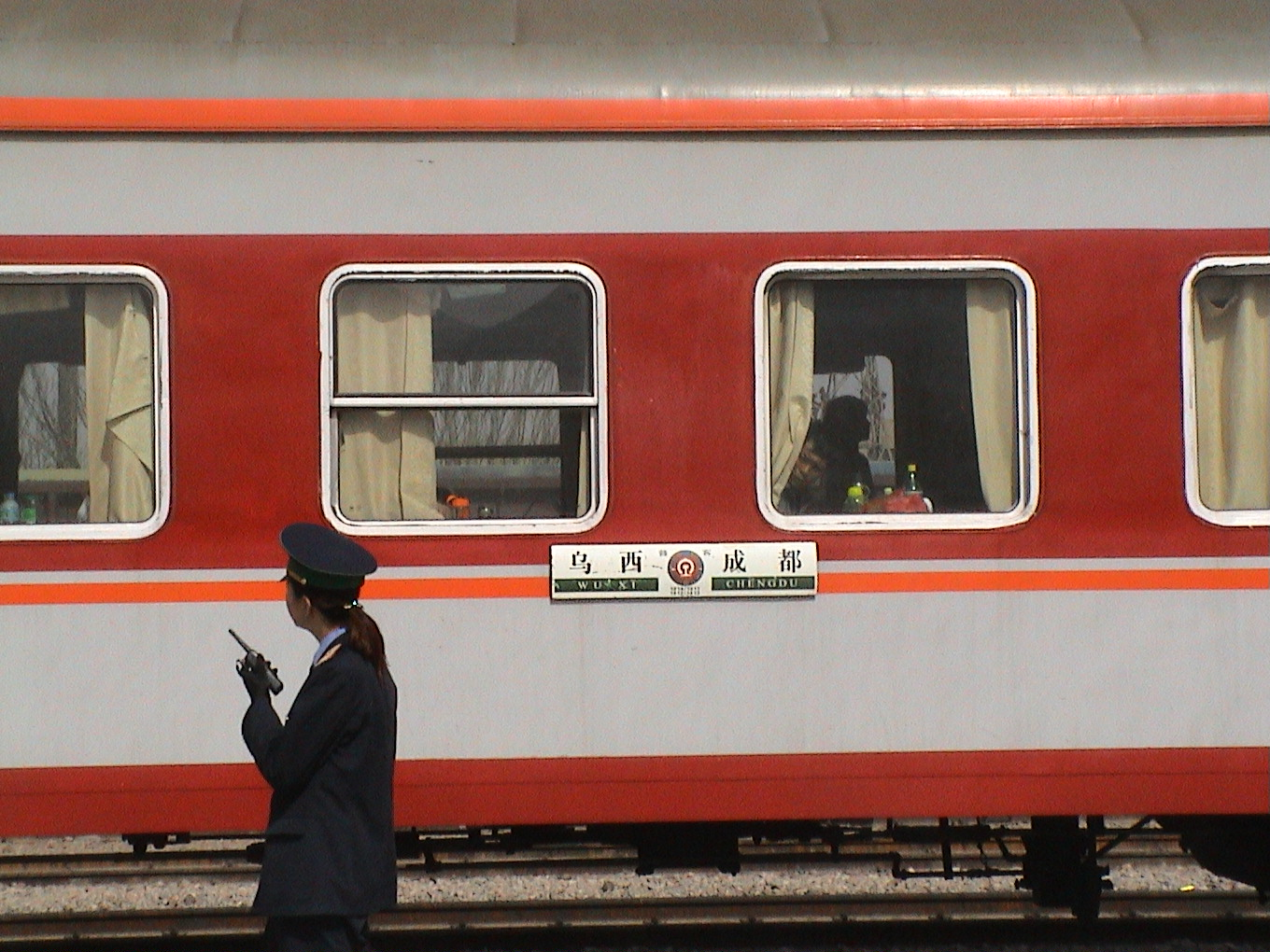
An air-conditioned General Fast Train from Chengdu to Ürümqi West

==== General Fast Train ====
General fast trains (普通旅客快车, which can be shortened to 普快, Pukuai) are slower passenger trains that stop at around half of the stations along the way, resulting in a longer travel time than the fast trains. The top speed is 120 km/h. Route numbers are always four numeric digits—a numeric prefix from 1-5 followed by a 3-digit route number. Numbers 1001–1998 for the trains running through three or more railway bureaus, 2001–3998 for the trains running through two railway bureaus, and 4001–5998 for the trains that run in only one railway bureau.

==== General Train ====
The general train (普通旅客列车, which can be shortened to 普客, Puke) has as many stops as possible, and is often the preferred choice for rural workers to visit their home villages because of low ticket price. This is the slowest type of train and has the lowest priority in the Fixed Train Timetable (图定列车). The top speed is 100 km/h. These trains are often the only available transportation in rural area lacking highway infrastructures, but is gradually being phased out in favour of faster trains.

Route identifiers for general trains are always 4 digits—a numeric prefix from 6-7 followed by a 3-digit route number. 6001–6198 are used for the trains that run in more than one railway bureau, while 7001–7598 will be used for the trains that run in only one railway bureau.

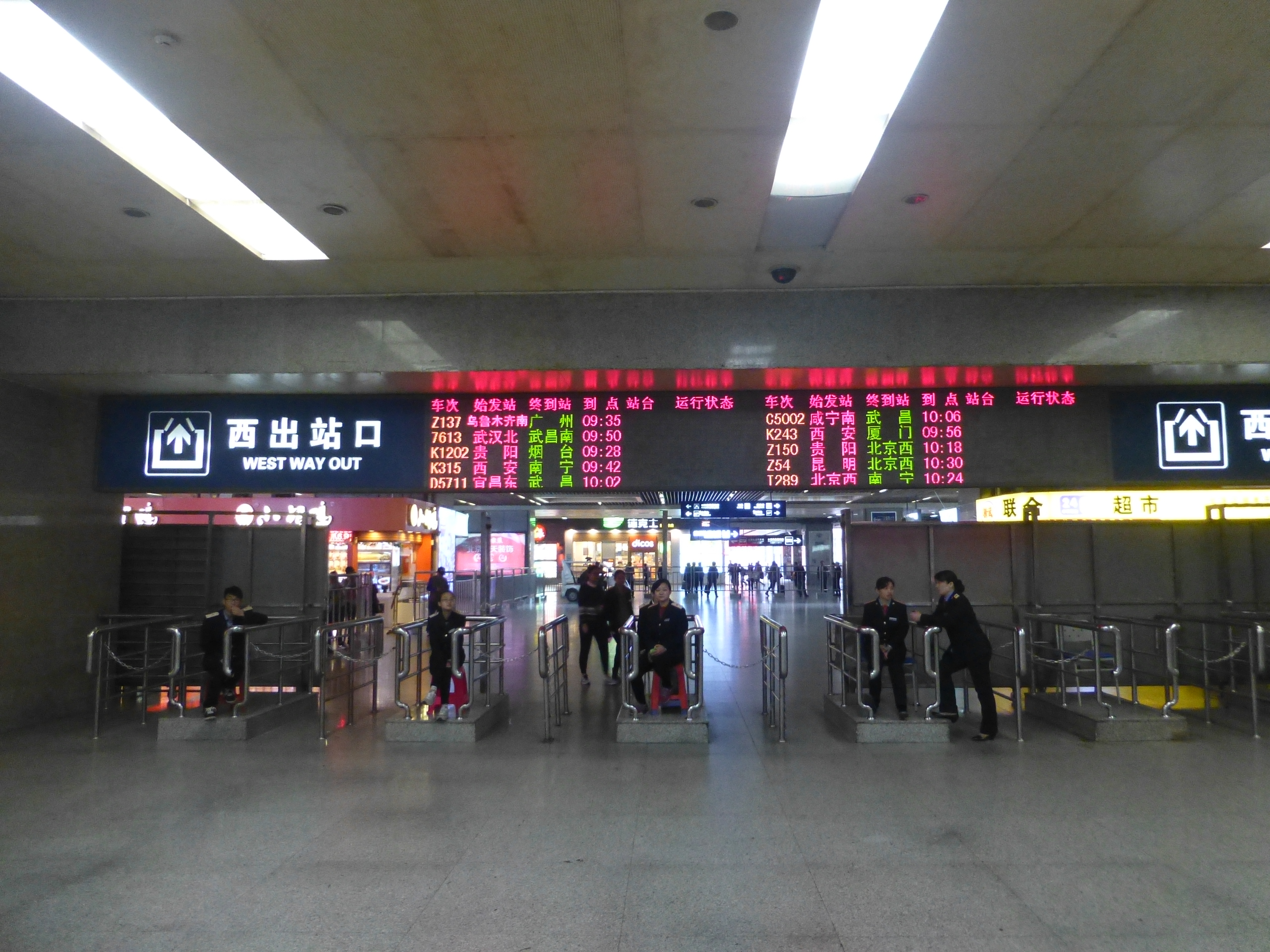
A Wuhan North-Wuchang South employee commuter train (No. 7613) makes a rare appearance in the arrival announcement board at Wuchang Railway Station. Although the service has been operating since 2010, the train - or either of its terminals - have never been listed in the reservation systems accessible to general public.

==== Commuter Train ====
The commuter train is usually runs for railway staff to commute or consult their doctor, but also takes their children to school and brings them back in some areas. Generally tickets for such a kind of train are not available for passengers. Route identifiers for commuter trains are 4 digits with a range of 7601–8998.

==== Temporary Train ====
The "L" trains are temporary — they are not listed in the official train schedule, but are added when necessary. Many of these trains only operate at peak passenger travel season such as during the spring festival travel season. In addition, many new train services are originally added as L-series before train schedules are readjusted and later become regular services. L1–L6998 are used for the temporary trains that run in more than one railway bureau, while L7001–L9998 will be used for the trains that run in only one railway bureau. Recently the type was merged into other types for more kinds of temporary services (e.g. Temporary Limited Express).

==== Y ("Linshilüyou", 临时旅游; Temporary Tourist Train) ====
This series is used for trains that specifically run for tourism. Only very few trains begin with Y. Besides, travel agencies can apply to the Railways Department for organizing additional passenger trains for the tours.

==== S ("Shijiao", 市郊; Suburban Commuter Rail) ====
This is a newer class developed to utilize idle tracks (mostly industrial or former industrial) to provide commuter travel to larger city centers from its suburban areas. Existing service until 2015 are S2 line from Yanqing County to Beijing, and Tianjin–Jixian Railway from Ji County to Tianjin. The Jinshan Railway from Jinshan County to Shanghai also fell in this category, but it is fully embedded in Shanghai Metro lines therefore tickets are not available on CR's website; while the other two offers more conventional service.

=== Former types ===
Types by 2004:

Type	Designation in Chinese	Route identifiers		Average speed (km/h)
Type	Designation in Chinese	Preceding letter	Number range	Average speed (km/h)
Almost-high-speed train	准高速列车 zhungaosu lieche	Z	1 – 98	120
Rapid express	快速旅客列车 kuaisu lüke lieche	K	1 – 98	N/A
Limited express	特别旅客快车 tebie lüke lieche	N/A	1 – 298	80 – 90
Express	旅客快车 lüke kuaiche	N/A	301 – 698	N/A
Standard [passenger] train	普通旅客列车 putong lüke lieche	N/A	701 – 898	N/A
Suburban [passenger] train	市郊旅客列车 shijiao lüke lieche	N/A	901 – 948	N/A
Dual-purpose train	混合列车 hunhe lieche	N/A	951 – 998	N/A
Tourist train	旅游列车 lüyou lieche	Y	1 – 298	N/A

Types during 2004 – 2009:

Hierarchy	Type	Designation in Chinese	Route identifiers		Average speed (km/h)
Hierarchy	Type	Designation in Chinese	Preceding letter	Number range	Average speed (km/h)
Limited express 特快旅客列车 tekuai lüke lieche	Non-stop [limited] express	直达特快 zhida tekuai	Z	1 – 998	119.2
Limited express 特快旅客列车 tekuai lüke lieche	Direct limited express	直通特快 zhitong tekuai	T	1 – 298	92.8
Limited express 特快旅客列车 tekuai lüke lieche	Limited express, within the administration (or corp.)	管内特快 guannei tekuai	T	301 – 998	92.8
Standard express with priority 快速旅客列车 kuaisu lüke lieche	Direct standard express with priority	直通 zhitong	K	1 – 998	66.5
Standard express with priority 快速旅客列车 kuaisu lüke lieche	Standard express with priority, within the administration (or corp.)	管内 guannei	N	1 – 998	66.5
Standard [passenger] train 普通旅客列车 putong lüke lieche	Standard express	普通旅客快车 putong lüke kuaiche	N/A	1001 – 5998	N/A
Standard [passenger] train 普通旅客列车 putong lüke lieche	Standard stopping train	普通旅客慢车 putong lüke manche	N/A	6001 – 8998	N/A
Temporary train		临时旅客列车 linshi lüke lieche	L or A	1 – 998	N/A
Tourist train		旅游列车 lüyou lieche	Y	1 – 998	N/A

As the Rule of The Edit and Management of Train Timetable, a rule issued by Ministry of Railway, the arrangement of following passenger train classes was put into practice from April 1, 2009.

Types during 2009 – 2015:

Type	Designation in Chinese	Abbreviation	Route identifiers		Average maximal speed (km/h)
Type	Designation in Chinese	Abbreviation	Preceding letter	Number range	Average maximal speed (km/h)
High-speed EMU train	高速动车组旅客列车 gaosu dongchezu lüke lieche	高 gao	G	1 – 9998	350
EMU train	动车组旅客列车 dongchezu lüke lieche	动 dong	D	1 – 9998	250
Intercity EMU train	城际动车组旅客列车 chengji dongchezu lüke lieche	城 cheng	C	1 – 9998	200
Non-stop express	直达特快旅客列车 zhida tekuai lüke lieche	直 zhi	Z	1 – 9998	160
Limited express	特快旅客列车 tekuai lüke lieche	特 te	T	1 – 9998	140
Standard express with priority	快速旅客列车 kuaisu lüke lieche	快 kuai	K	1 – 9998	120
Standard express	普通旅客快车 putong lüke kuaiche	N/A	N/A	1001 – 5998	below 120
Standard stopping train	普通旅客慢车 putong lüke manche	N/A	N/A	6001 – 7598	below 120
Commuter train	通勤列车 tongqin lieche	N/A	N/A	7601 – 8998	N/A
Temporary train	临时旅客列车 linshi lüke lieche	临 lin	L	1 – 9998	N/A
Tourist train	旅游列车 lüyou lieche	游 you	Y	1 – 998	N/A
