= China Railways 25G rolling stock =

Passenger carriages built in China

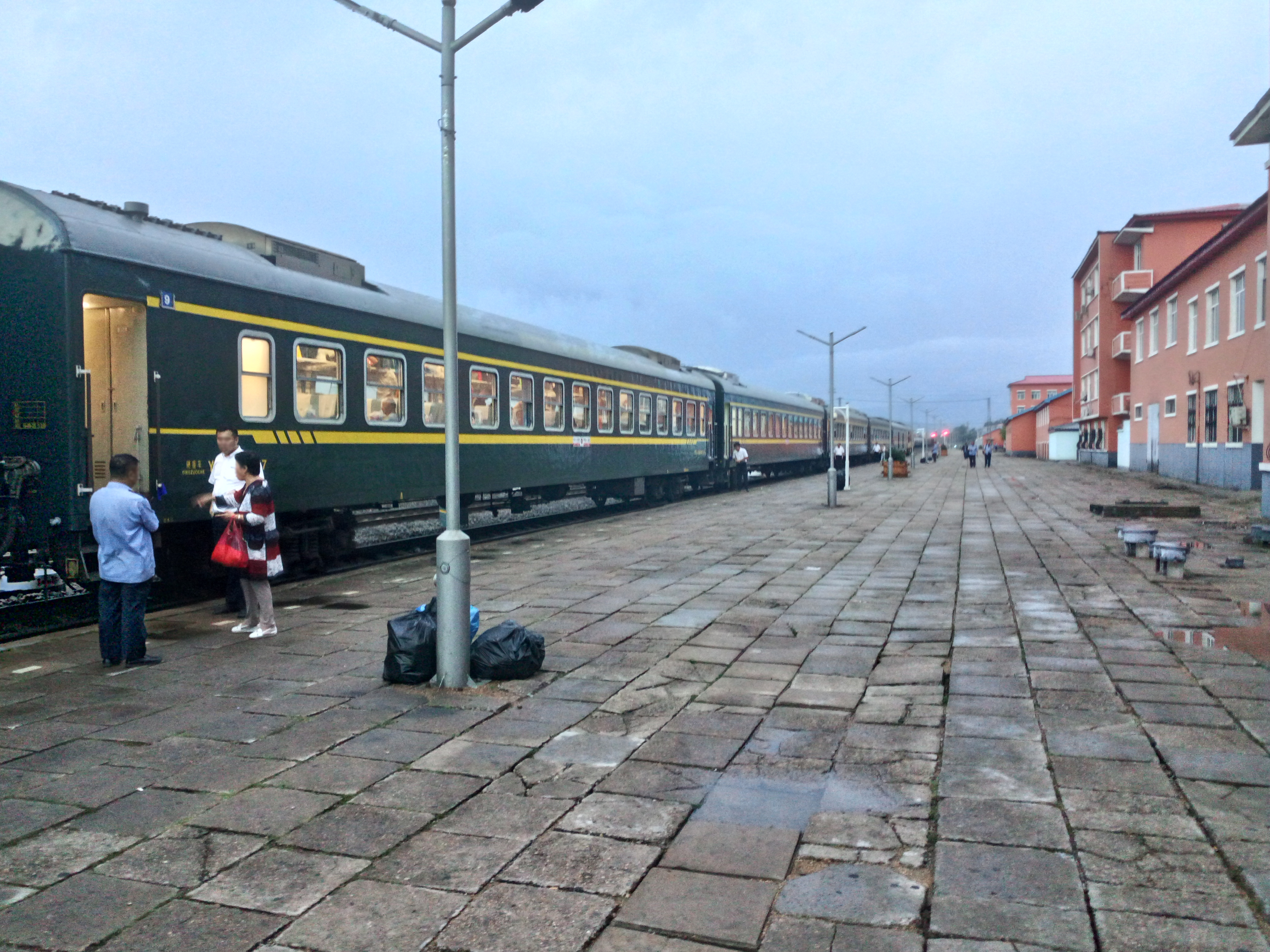
- China Railway train K1022 using 25G rolling stocks
- In service: 1991-
- Manufacturer: Changchun Passenger Carriage Factory
- Built at: CRRC Changchun; CRRC Qingdao Sifang; CRRC Tangshan; CRRC Nanjing Puzhen
- Capacity: 36 (soft sleeper) 66 (hard sleeper); 112/116/118 (hard seat) 72 (soft seat)
- Operators: China Railway; Ethiopian Railway; Kenya Railways; Laos–China Railway Company Limited

Specifications
- Car body construction: steel
- Car length: 25.5 m (84 ft) (over body); 26.6 m (87 ft) (over couplers)
- Width: 3,105 mm (10 ft 2.2 in)
- Height: 4,433 mm (14 ft 6.5 in)
- Doors: 4
- Maximum speed: 120 km/h (75 mph) (service); 140 km/h (87 mph) (structure)
- Braking systems: disc and flange
- Coupling system: AAR couplers
- Track gauge: 1,435 mm 1,520 mm (Mongolian)

China Railways 25G rolling stock (Chinese: 中国铁路25G型客车), or China Railways 25 improved rolling stock (Chinese: 中国铁路25改进型客车) is a series of passenger carriages built in China. The carriages run services on Classic Rail routes in mainland China, and on the Trans-Siberian Railway for international services to Moscow. They are also exported to Mombasa–Nairobi Standard Gauge Railway, Addis Ababa–Djibouti Railway, Guinea railways, Uganda Standard Gauge railways and Boten-Vientiane railway.

== Development ==
After the success of building the China Railways 25A rolling stocks, the Railway Bureau of China (now China Railway) decided to develop a new type of "Upgraded 25.5 metre sized air-conditioned and non air-conditioned passenger coaches" (升级换代产品 25.5米空调和非空调客车). The development lasted for a year till the first 25G carriage was built in Changchun Rolling Stocks Factory (now CRRC Changchun) and first used on the express train 13/4 Beijing to Shanghai to replace the 22 coaches.

== Improvements ==
=== 2nd Generation (2002-2003) ===
To meet the 25B and 25G coaches standard in 2002, the newly built coaches were fitted with new bogies. Those bogies are still used on modern 25G coaches with Anti-wheelslip devices and disc brakes. Most trains are fitted with sliding doors, double layer windows and rubber connections between coaches. Some of them are also fitted with vacuum sewage compartments and sealed connections. However, not all new generation coaches had those devices.

=== 3rd Generation (2004-) ===
To meet the 25G coaches standard in 2004, all new-built 25G rolling stocks are equipped with disc and air brakes. 25G coaches built after 2003 are fitted with DC-AC converters, and available to convert the DC600V electric charge into AC380V, AC220V, AC110V electric charges to serve the brake, air-conditioning, lighting and power outlet systems. Most 3rd-generation 25Gs built after 2008 removed the sliding doors and vacuum sewage compartments to reduce maintenance costs.

== Usage ==
Since the 25G coaches were first built in 1991, those coaches have been running on lines all over China as well as many other countries, most of them using Chinese standard. A typical 25G consist for K-series trains usually have 6 to 9 hard seat cars (YZ25G, the YZ stands for hard seat or 硬座, yìngzùo), one dining car (CA25G, the CA stands for 餐车, cānchē), one soft sleeper car (RW25G, the RW stands for 软卧, ruǎnwò), several hard sleeper cars (YW25G, the YW stands for 硬卧, yìngwò) and a luggage car (XL25G, XL stands for 行李). Some of the trains run on non-electrified routes and cannot receive electric supplies from locomotives are also fitted with a generator car (KD25G, the KD stands for 空调发电, kōngtiáofādiàn). Some trains also have soft seat cars (RZ25G, the RZ stands for 软座, ruǎnzuò).

== Accidents and incidents ==
- On June 18, 2004, a KD25G generator car and a DF11 locomotive on passenger train 1539 from Xinxiang to Shenzhen via Beijing-Kowloon line were hit by a collapsed concrete part of a ditch. No one was hurt, but the incident caused damage to the locomotive and the generator car, and a 9-hour delay.
- On November 19, 2004, at 22:32, 8 runaway freight cars from Harbin West line collided with passenger train K340 (Jiamusi-Beijing) in Guxiang yard, Harbin, derailing the SS9 locomotive, a XL25G luggage car and a YW25G hard sleeper car.
- On July 31, 2005, at 19:52, train K127 (Xi'an-Changchun) using a SS9 locomotive and several 25G stocks met a signal failure between Xinchengzi and Xintaizi on Changchun-Dalian railway line (now Beijing-Harbin line) caused by a missing routing box. The driver made a serious fault to shut off the LKJ monitor (like the AWS system in UK), and crashed into the freight train 33219, causing a serious accident. The locomotive was seriously damaged ("The aerodynamic head was completely flattened"), a XL25G luggage car and a YW25G hard sleeper car turned over. Three YW25G hard sleeper cars also derailed.
- On November 17, 2005, at 00:50, train K27 from Beijing to Dandong caught fire in a KD25G generator car on Qinhuangdao-Shenyang line. The train had an emergency stop after workers have used out all the fire extinguishers. The overhead wire was damaged by the fire, and the generator car was destroyed in the accident. No one was injured.
- On June 11, 2006, at 09:24, train T159 from Qingdao to Guangzhou East crashed into train 1017 on Beijing-Kwoloon line between Linzhai and Dongshui. The driver unlocked the LKJ system and ran over a red light. The accident caused a 10-hour shutdown of the railway line and more than 20 injuries.
- On February 28 at 02:05, some carriages of train 5807 from Urumchi to Aksu was blown over by strong wind between Zhenzhuquan and Hongshanqu stations. Cars 9 to 19 derailed and turned over. The accident caused 3 deaths and 34 injuries.
- On January 3 at 14:44, train K23 from Moscow to Beijing via Ulan Bator caught fire in the KD25G generator car. The train was delayed but there were no injuries.
- On June 29, 2009, at 02:31, train K9017 had a brake failure when approaching Bangzhou Station, running over a switch and crashed into train K9063. The accident caused 3 deaths and 63 injuries. The cause of the accident was that a worker in CRRC Nanjing Puzhen left a lid inside the braking pipes of a 25G stock, which completely jammed the braking system of the train.
- On May 23, 2010, at 02:10, train K859 met a hill collapse. Carriages 1 to 5 rolled over while 6 to 8 derailed (all YZ25Gs). Car 6 "slammed" onto car 4. Car 7 to car 9 were twisted into a zigzag shape. The accident caused 19 deaths and 71 injuries.
- On August 19, 2010, at 15:00, train K165 from Xi'an to Kunming was stopped by a worker for the bridge ahead was tilting because of a flood. The driver evacuated the passengers before the bridge finally went out and cars 15 and 16 (both YW25G) fell into the river. No one was injured in the incident, but the line was closed for 60 days. The 45 km/h speed limit on the bridge was lifted in April 2014.
- On November 15, 2010, at around 3am, the 5th car of the train K157 (YZ25G) derailed in Liuzhou South Station.
- On August 16, 2013, at 04:10, a generator car (KD25G) caught fire. The train was delayed for 2 hours and 33 minutes, but nobody was injured. The cause of the incident was that the generator operator fell asleep and didn't notice a leaked cylinder (made by CRRC Qingdao Sifang), as well as the alarm of the smoke detector.
- On April 13, 2014, at 03:17, train K7034 from Heihe to Harbin derailed on the Harbin-Beian railway line. The cause was a worker, who was unsatisfied with his job, removed a 12-metre long rail from the track. The accident caused a 16-hour shutdown of the Harbin-Beian line and 15 injuries.
