= K-series trains =

Chinese high-speed train class

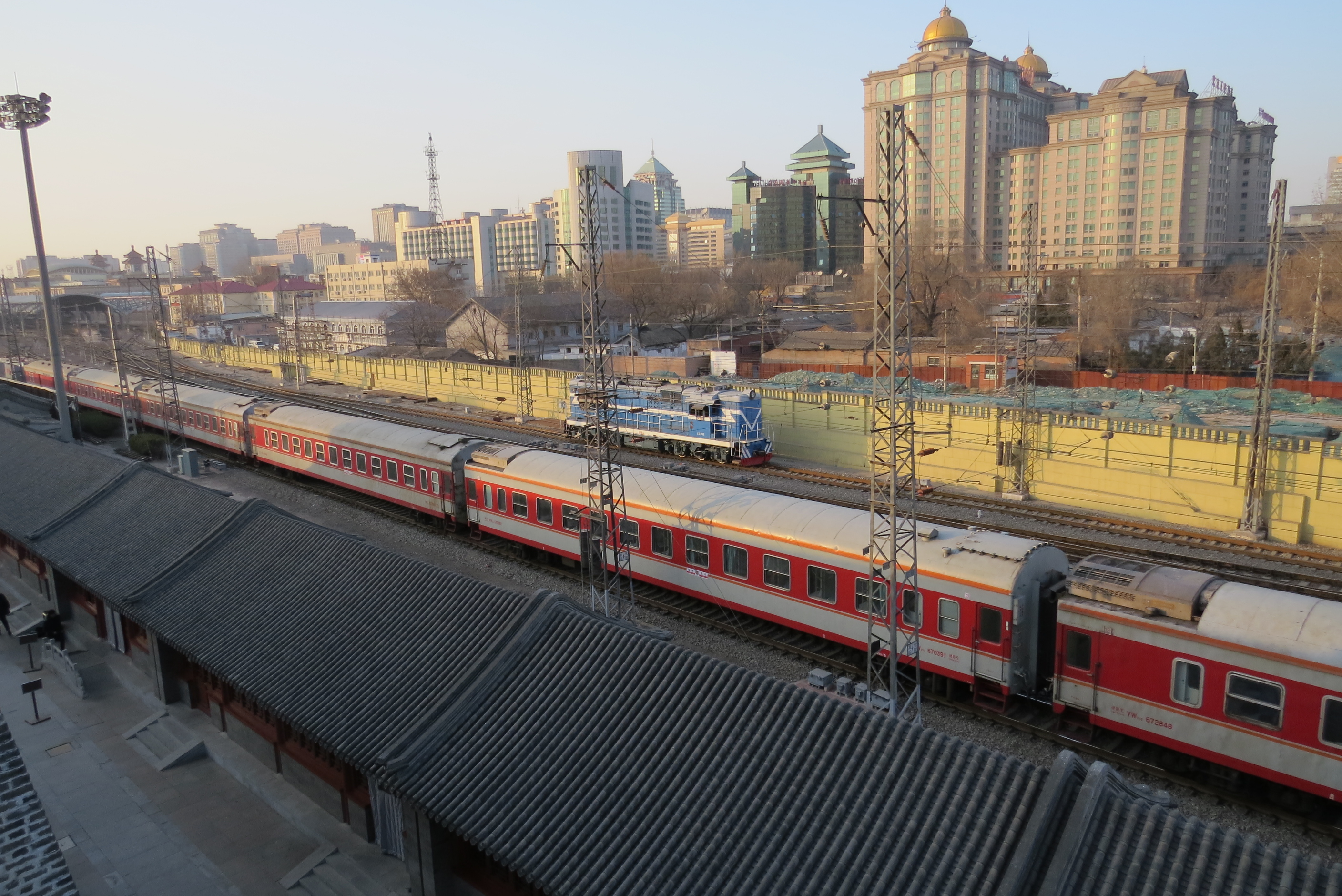
K102 departing Wenzhou to Beijing in December 2014

The K series (Chinese: 快速旅客列车) is a train service speed level by China Railway. K stands for "kuaisu" (lit. 'fast-speed'). However, they were used to likely to be the most commonly seen trains in China. Those trains make less stops than the number-only trains, but run at the same speed as them with a maximum speed of 120 km/h. For this, the K-series are sometimes mentioned as "Keng" (a scam) by Chinese Railfans. Train numbers are written in the form of K*** or K****, but the letter K reads as "kuai (快)" in station announcements and radio contacts.

== History ==
=== 1997–2004 ===
The K-series trains first appeared in the first railway speed-up campaign as a service speed level, lower than the T-series but faster than the number-only series. The letter K was used in a train number for the first time in China. All the train numbers in the level were K***.

=== 2004–2009 ===
With more and more short-distance K-series trains are made, the idea of N-series (管内列车) level was brought up in the fifth railway speed-up campaign. The train numbers were in the N*** form.

=== 2009– ===
The N-series was combined into the K-series again, for the appearance of K7*** series.

== Rolling stock ==
Most K-series trains run using air-conditioned China Railways 25G rolling stock for carriages.

A few K-series trains use China Railways 25B, 25 or 22 rolling stocks, which are usually not air-conditioned and even coal-heated in winter. The 22 rolling stocks for K-series are most commonly seen in the northeastern part of China, where some railway lines cannot support 25G carriages to run on.

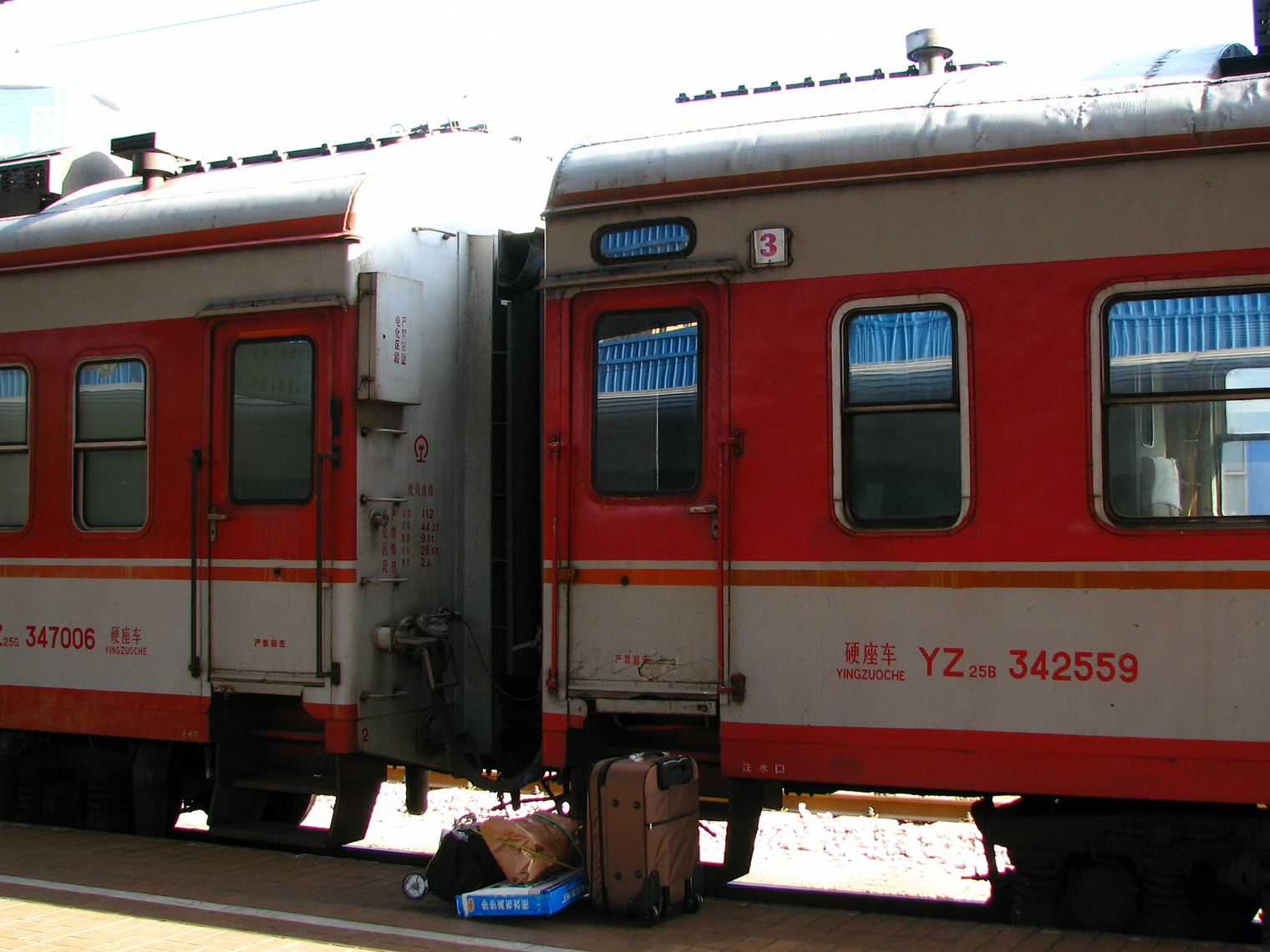
A China Railways 25G rolling stock (left) and a China Railways 25B rolling stock (right) equipped with Hard seat

The 25T rolling stocks on K-series trains are really rare to be found. They are usually on the temporary trains, such as K5031/2 Dalian–Changchun service, which is only available on national holidays.

== Train numbers ==
Trains are arranged into pairs, one for a direction (usually called upward (上行) for trains getting closer to Beijing or from branches to mainlines, and downward (下行) for trains getting farther from Beijing or from mainlines to branches), divided in a slash (/). For example, the Beijing-Moscow train via Ulaanbaatar is numbered K3, while the returning one numbered K4, so the pair is K3/4. Some pairs of trains have more than two train numbers, for an upward trains may become a downward train for they pass through Beijing or certain points.

In 2009, all the K-series trains are fixed to certain numbers arranged in a set of rules.

K-series trains numbered K1 to K3998 represents inter-bureau trains, which runs longer distances than others. Including international trains.

Train numbers K4001 to K4998 represents inter-bureau temporary trains, or former L-series.

Train numbers K5001 to K6998 represents inner-bureau (or regional) temporary trains, also former L-series.

Train numbers K7001 to K9998 represents inner-bureau trains. Most of them run on regional routes, however some of them also run a longer distance, for the larger bureau responsibility areas.

== See also ==
- Inter-city rail
