= Green-skinned train =

Communist block trains

External image
- Green painted East German type 24 passenger car for China Railway in 1989

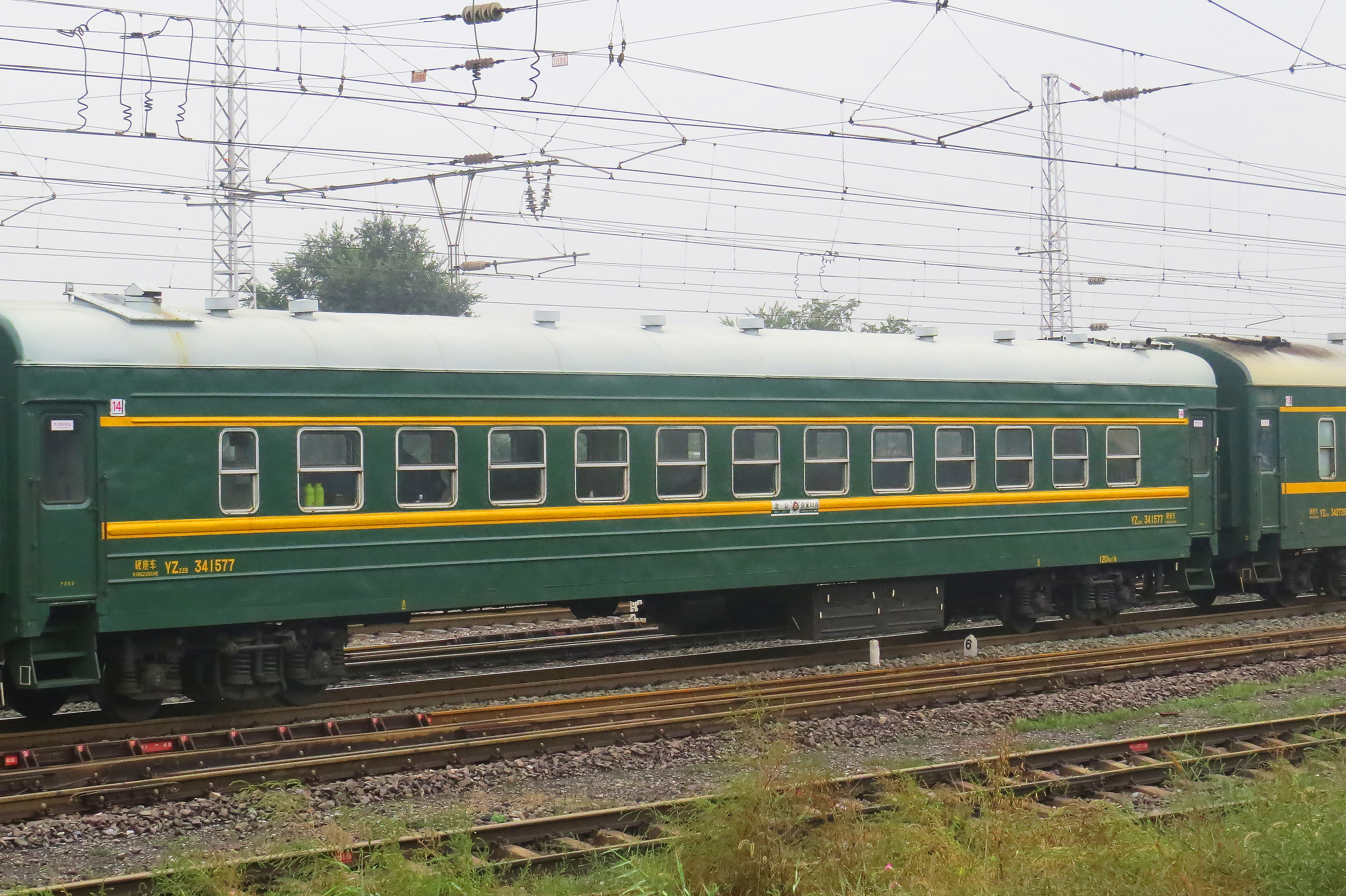
Train 4416, a "green train" operated by the Beijing Railway Bureau

The terms green-skinned train and green train (Chinese: 绿皮车; pinyin: lǜpíchē; lit. 'green skin carriage') refer to a type of design which used to be the mainstay of the passenger railway fleets of China and other communist countries during the Cold War. These words carry connotations of slow travel on old vehicles with few amenities, most notably lacking air conditioning. Despite these connotations, most locomotive-hauled passenger railroad cars in China have been repainted to a shade of dark green.

== Gallery ==
=== China ===
Although strictly speaking only a subset of Chinese carriages have green as their original paint color, such as the Type 23 and Type 25B, colloquially the term "green-skinned train" usually refers to the service classes of "普通旅客快车" (conventional fast train) and "普通旅客列车" (conventional slow train) which use locomotive-hauled trains without a fixed consist of railroad cars. Starting from 2014 almost all conventional rail cars have been gradually repainted to a "olive green" colour, supposedly to reduce operating expenses and make military use of railways harder to spot. (Note: This is a possible reason as military rail vehicles in China are all green in contrast to the many original colors of passenger cars, however many railfans can easily tell them apart using differences in top-mounted air conditioners and chimneys, window shapes and sizes, and other physical features, so the effectiveness of this argument is doubted.) Only a few cars still retain their original color, in particular Type 25G cars maintained by Xidaku (西大库) depot in Beijing. This green-painting ("刷绿") has angered many Chinese railfans, and original-colored cars ("原色") are considered very valuable to photograph and film.

==== Original ====
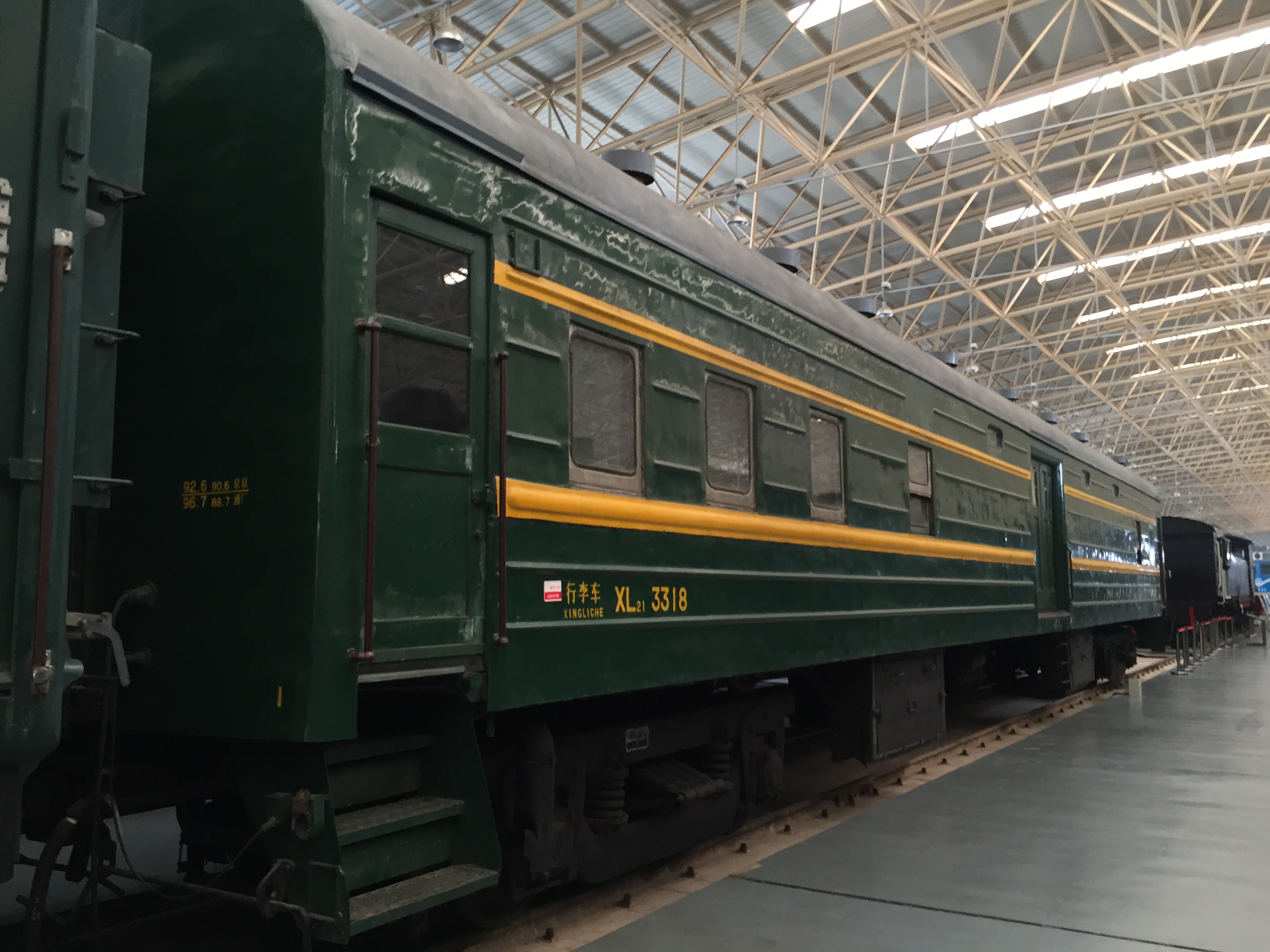
Type 21

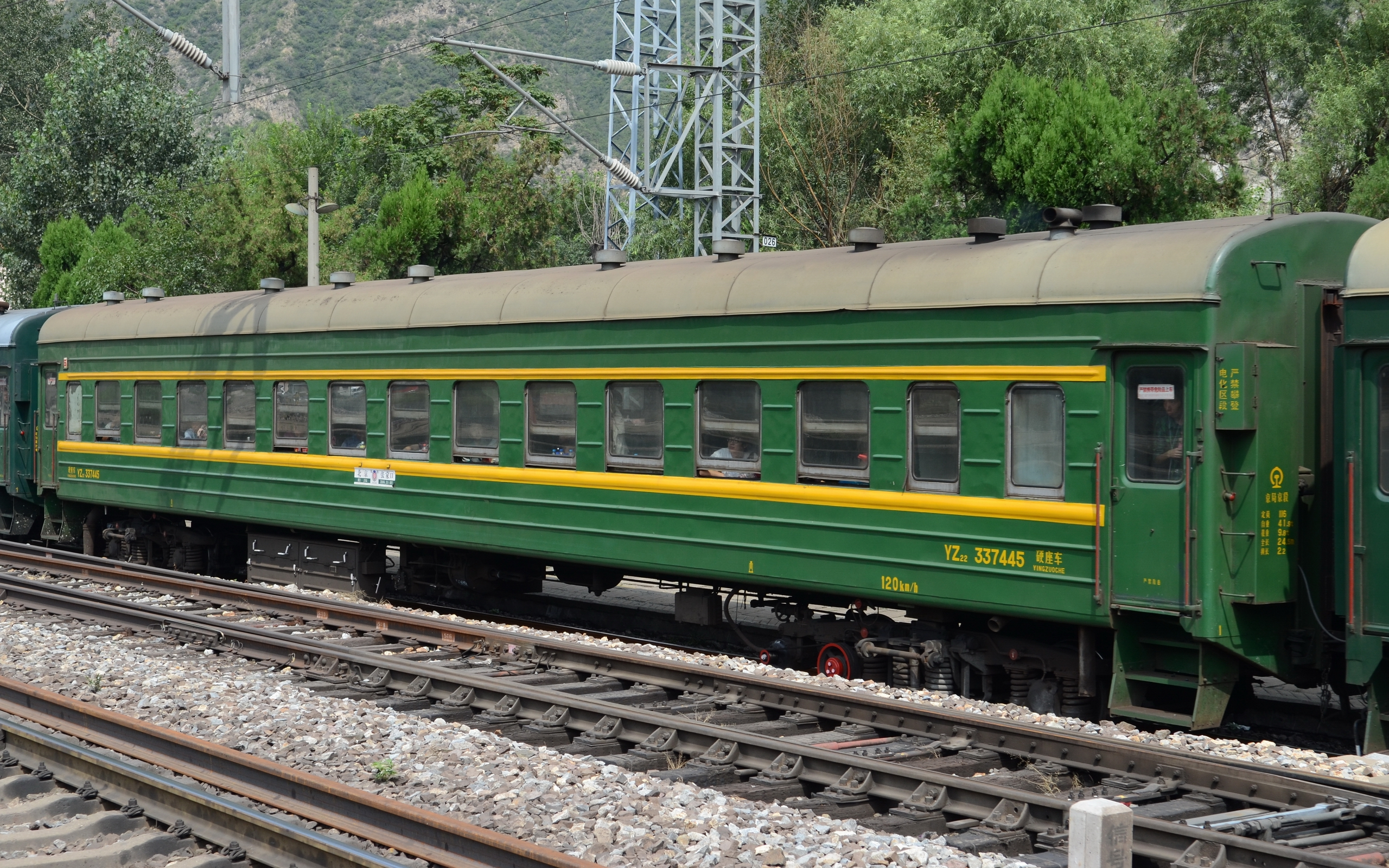
Type 22

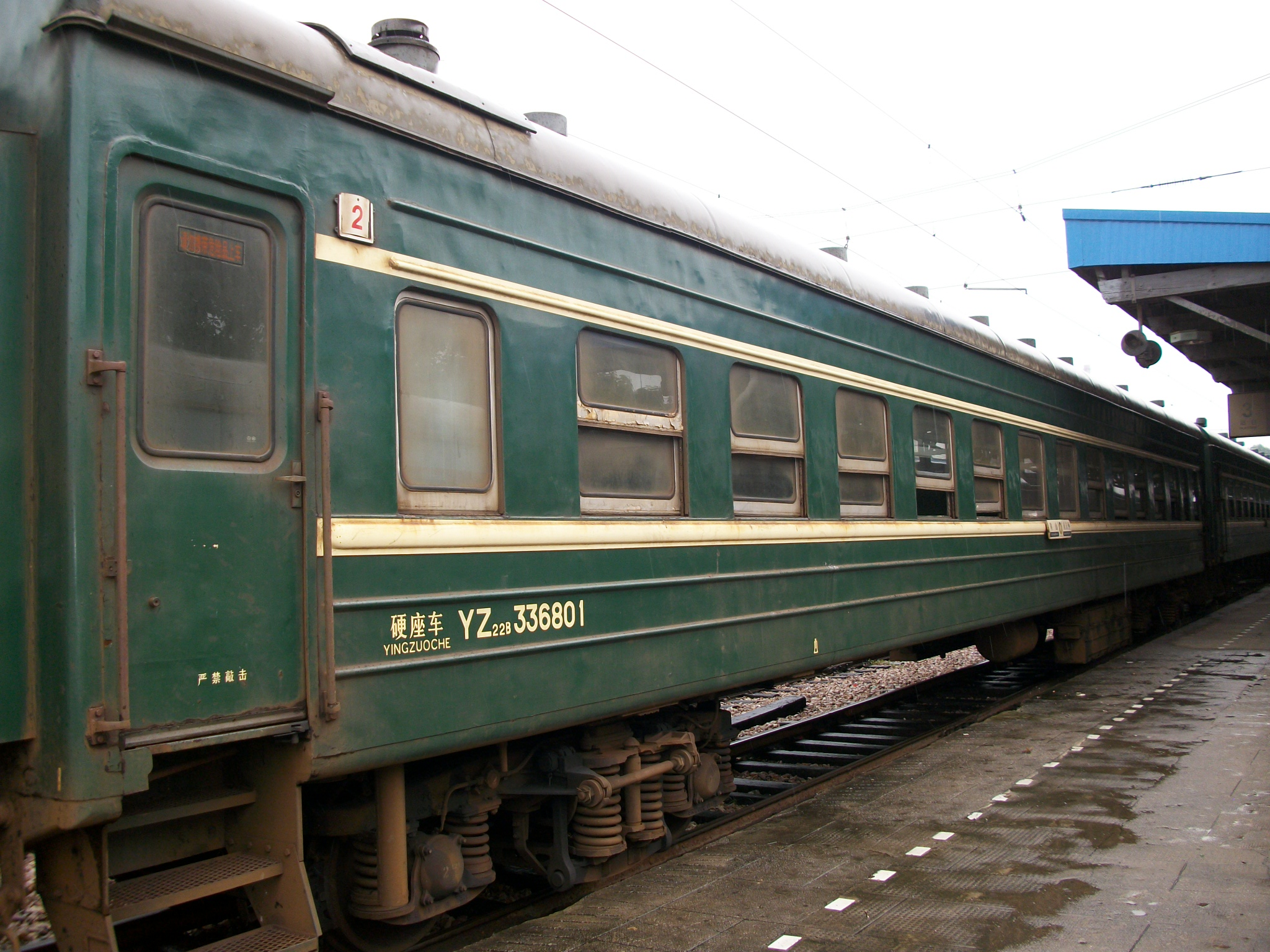
Type 22B

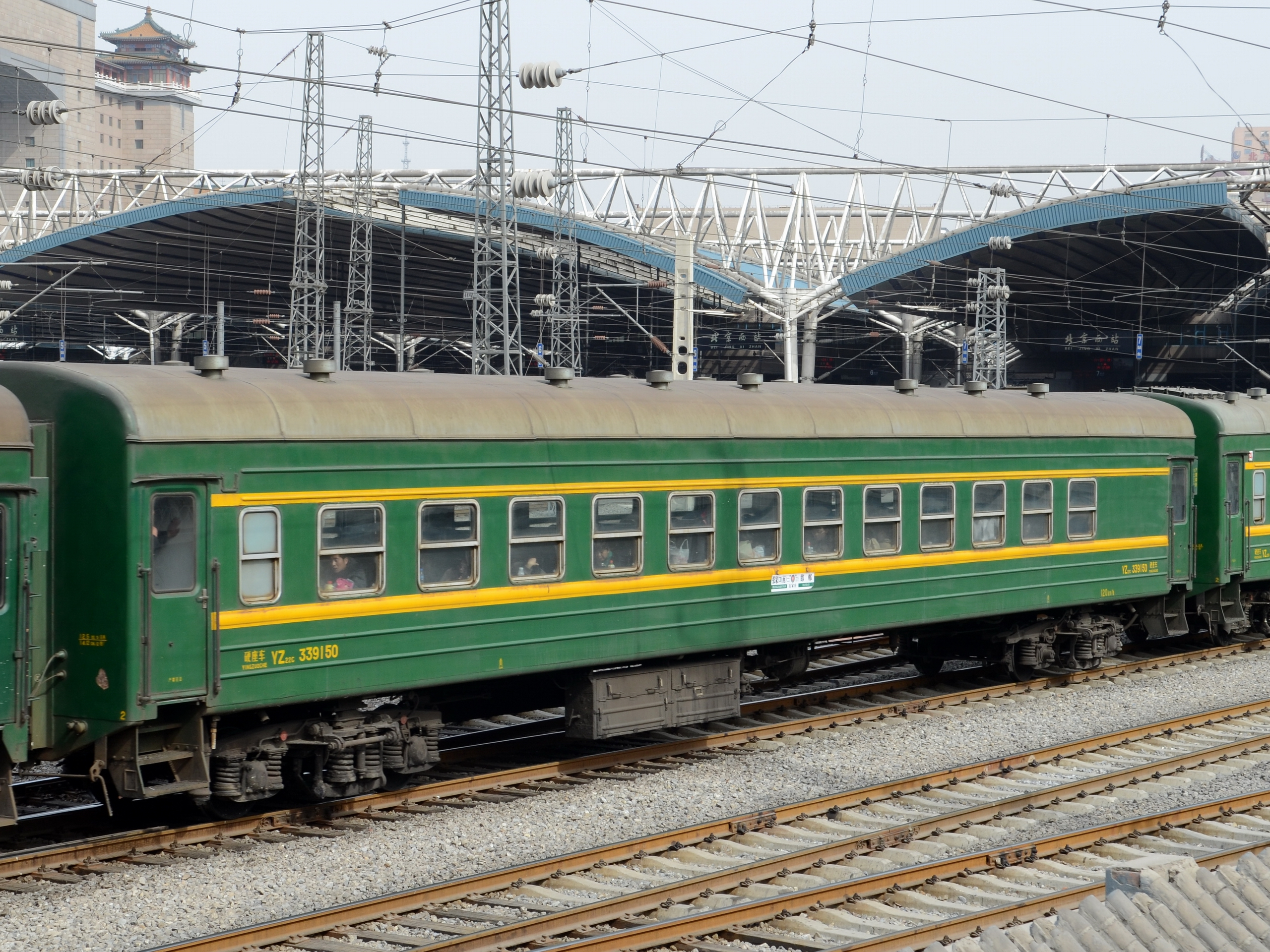
Type 22C

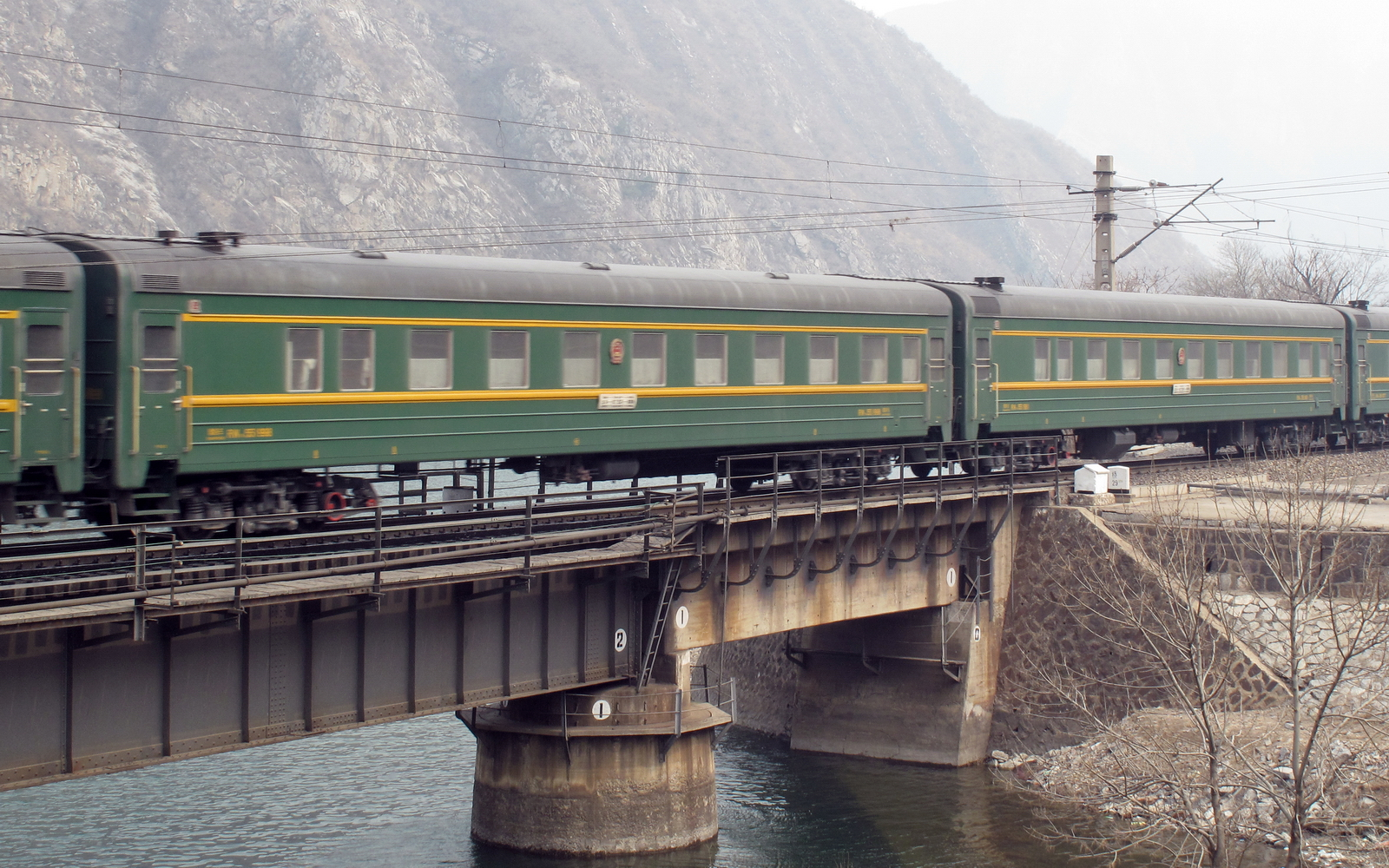
Type 18

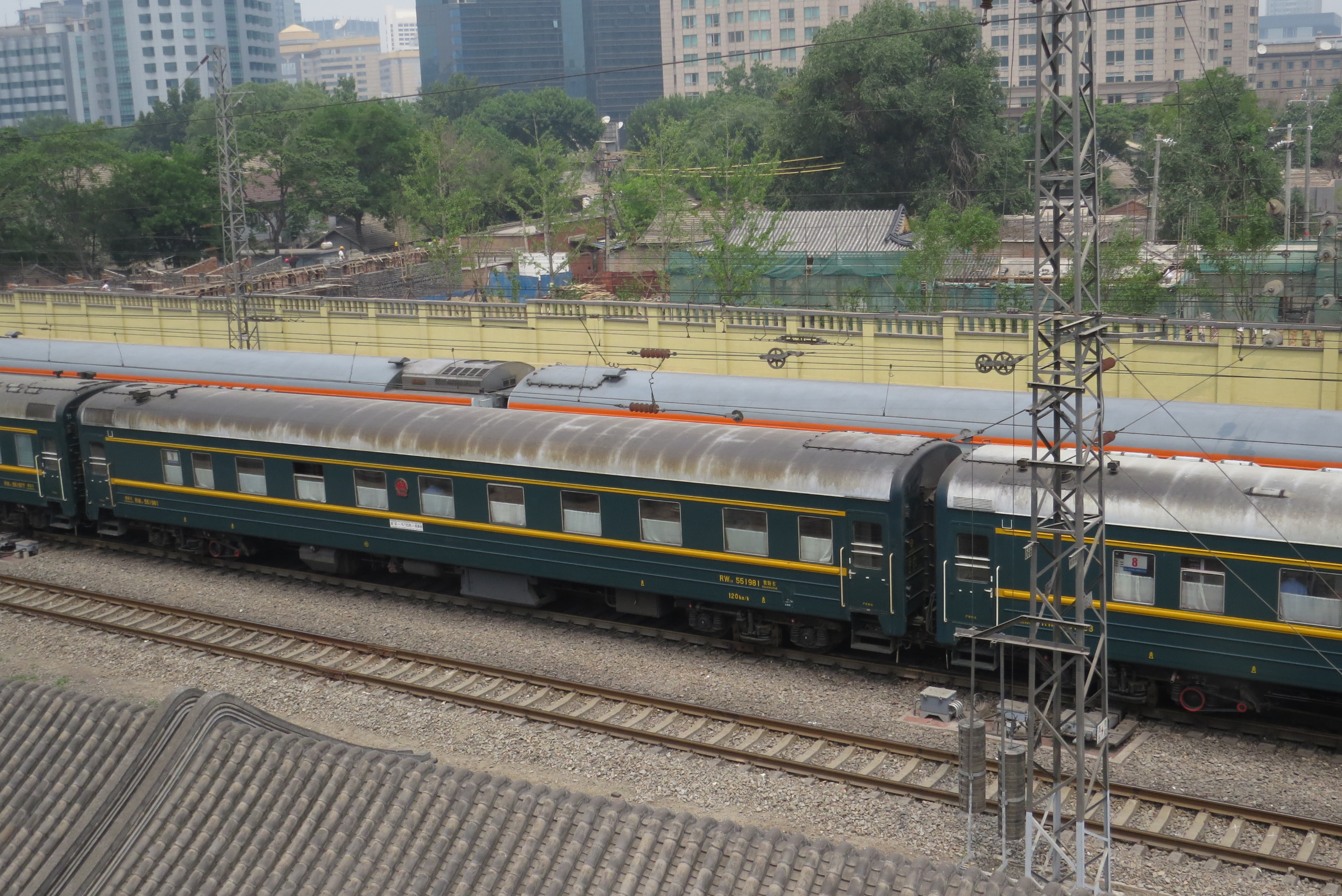
Type 19

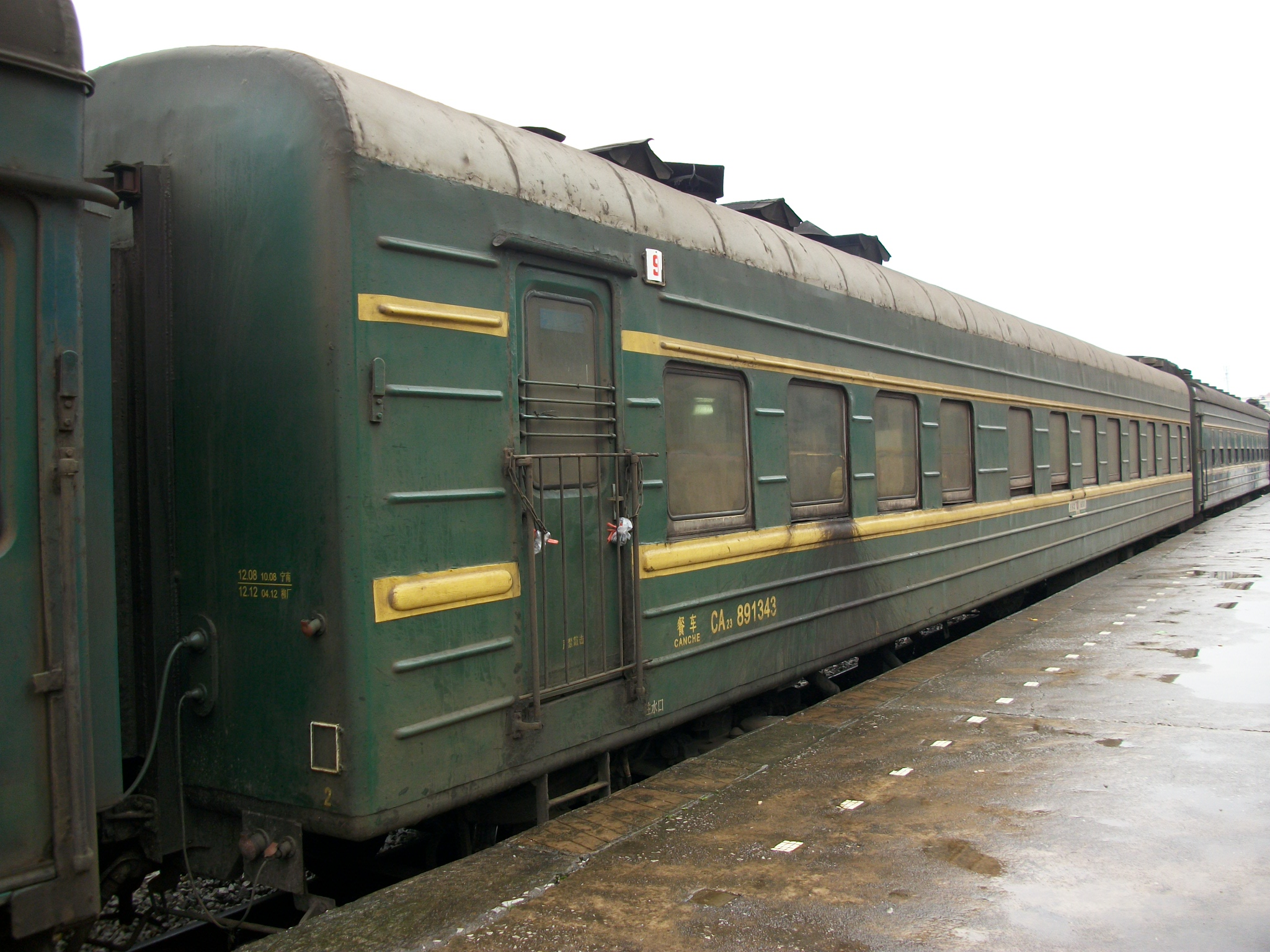
Type 23

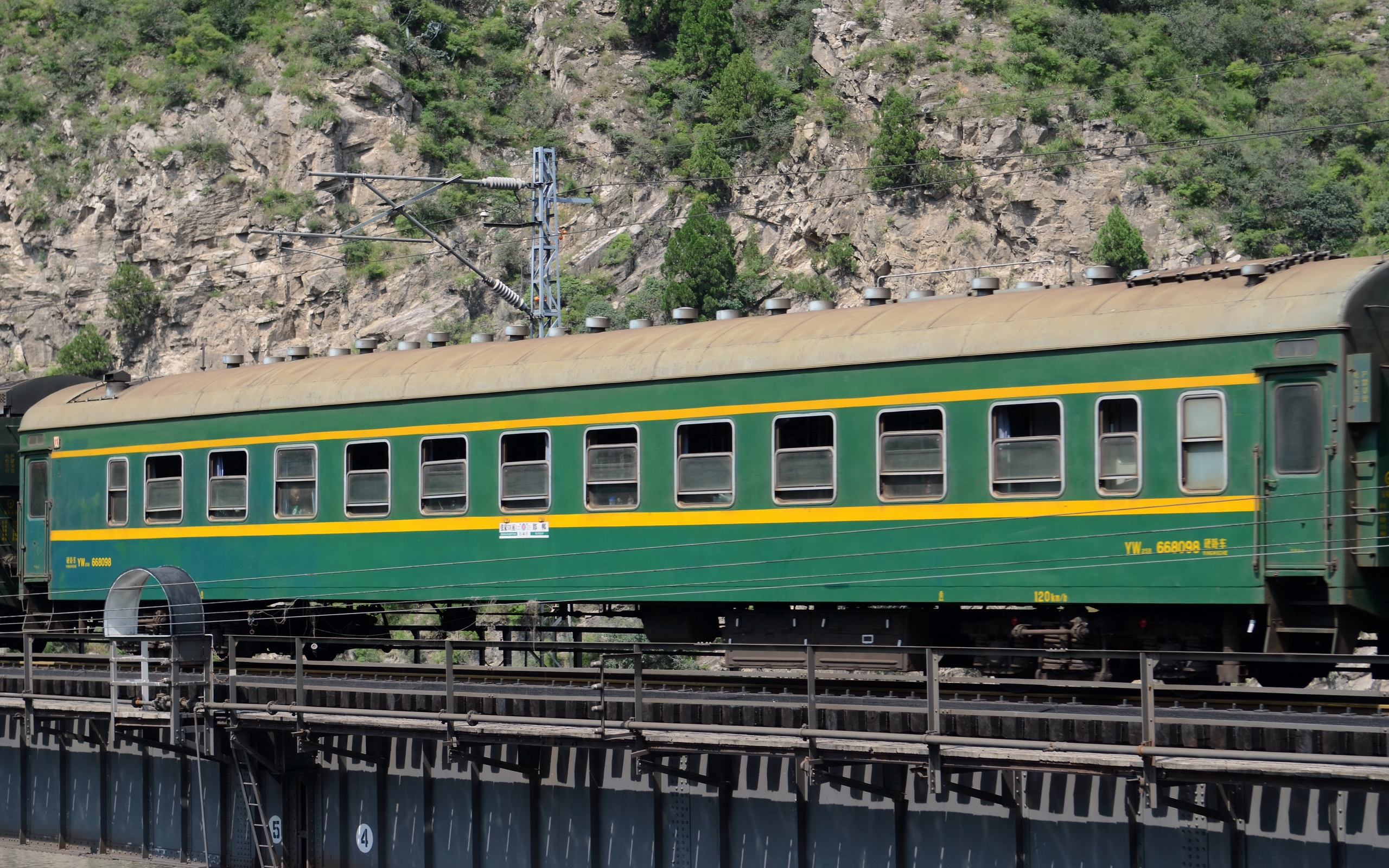
Type 25B (pre-2014)

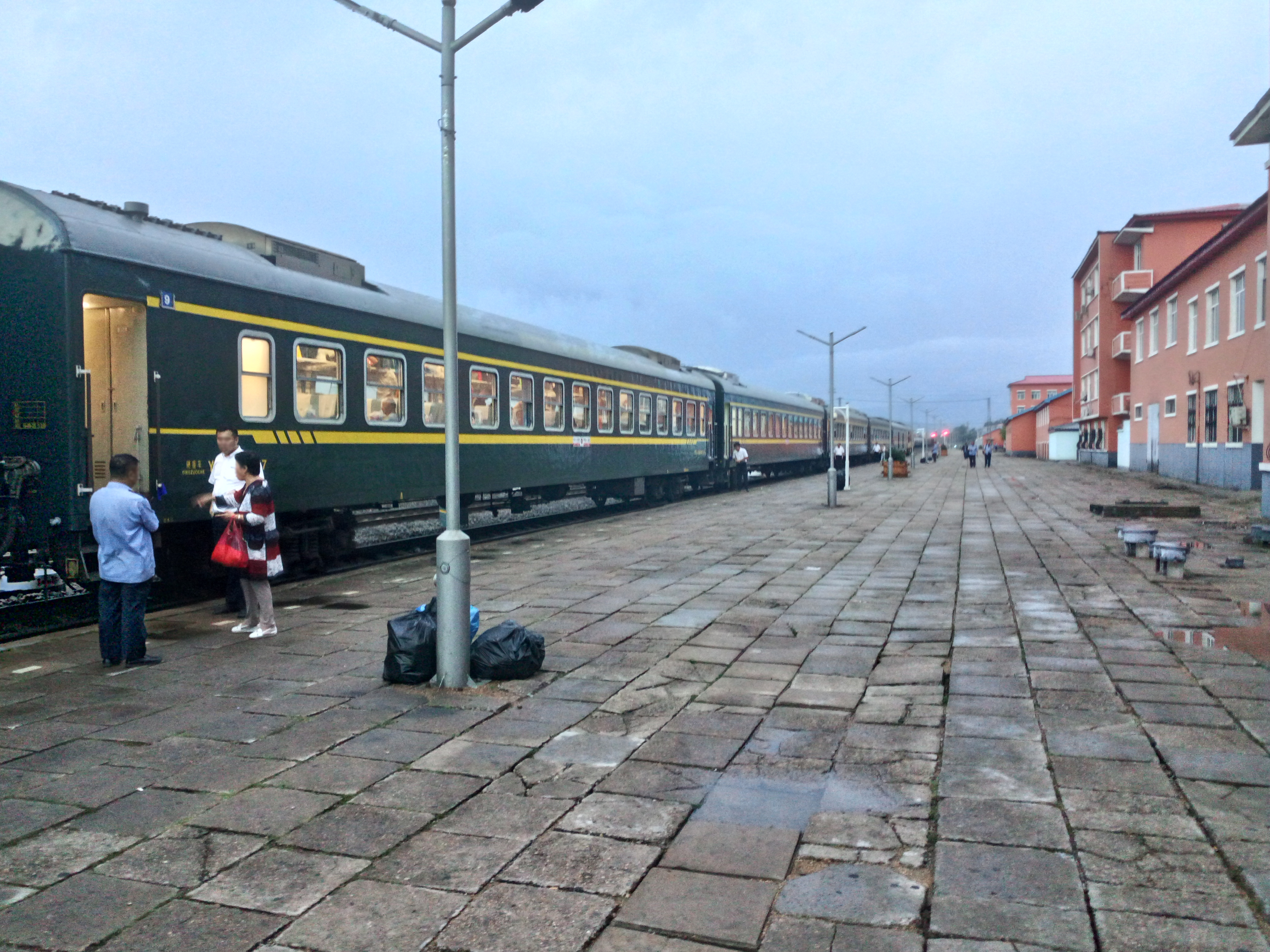
Type 25G

==== Modern ====
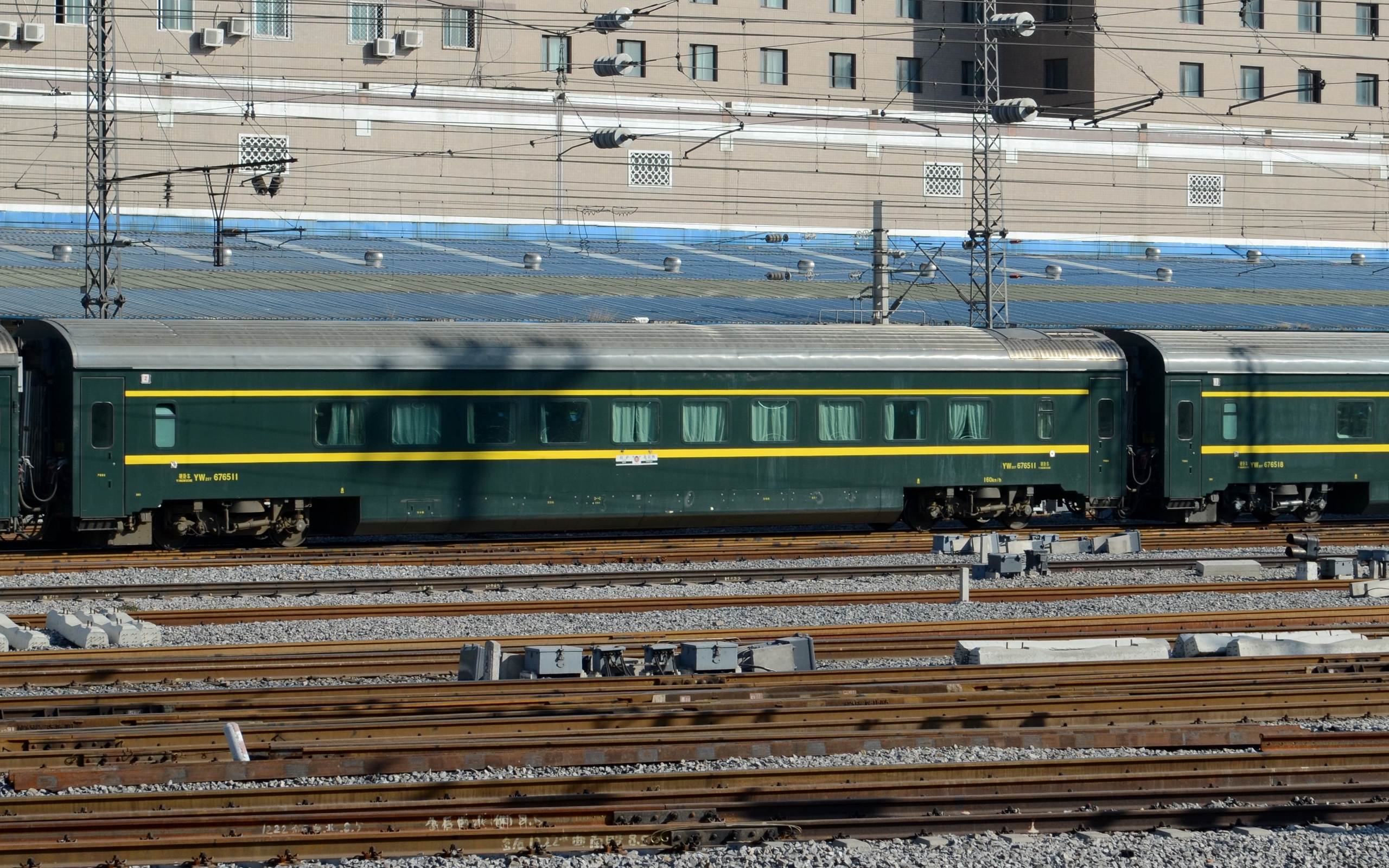
A Type 25T for the Qinghai-Tibet railway, not a "green train" in the traditional sense

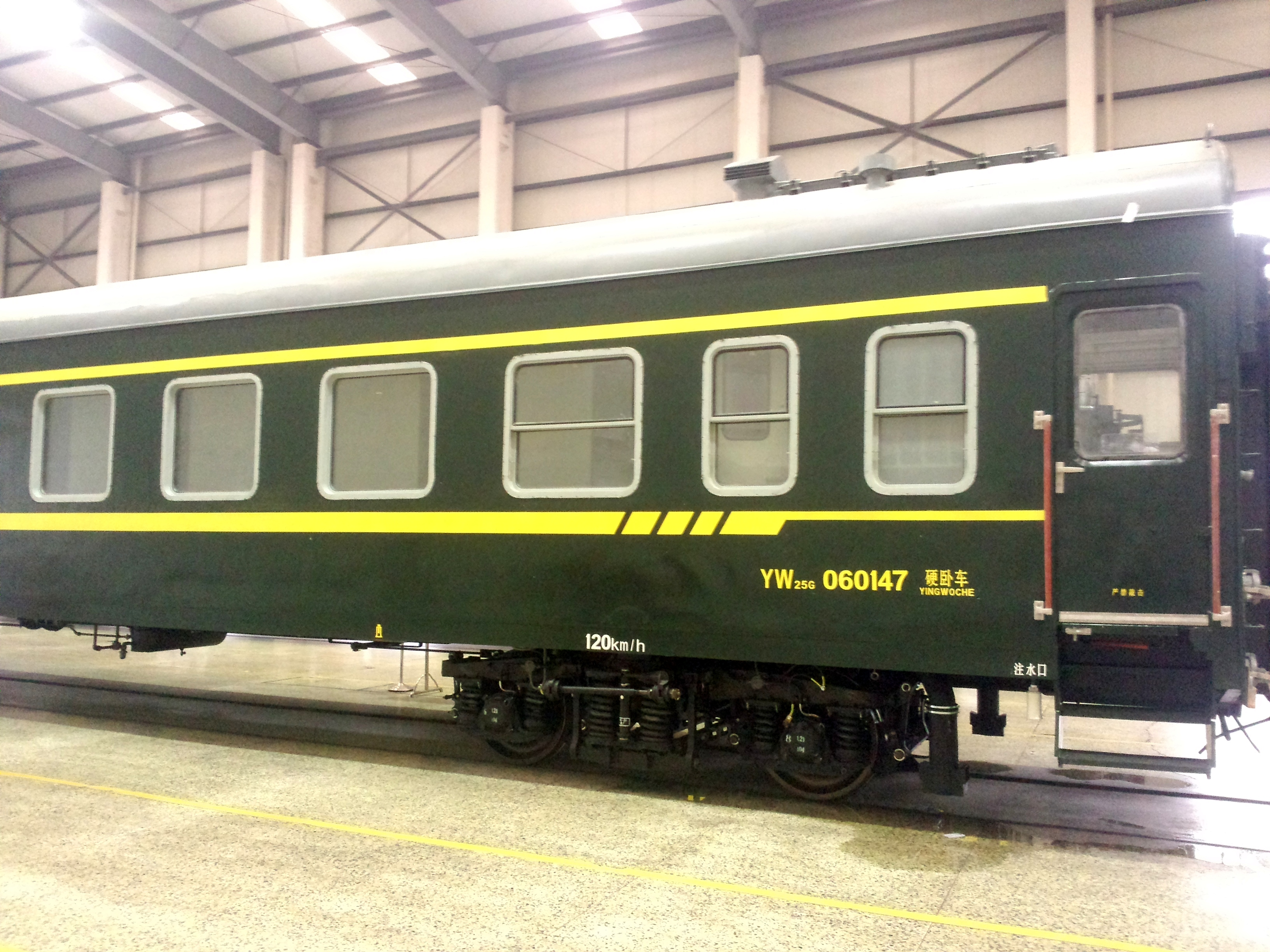
A Type 25G painted green

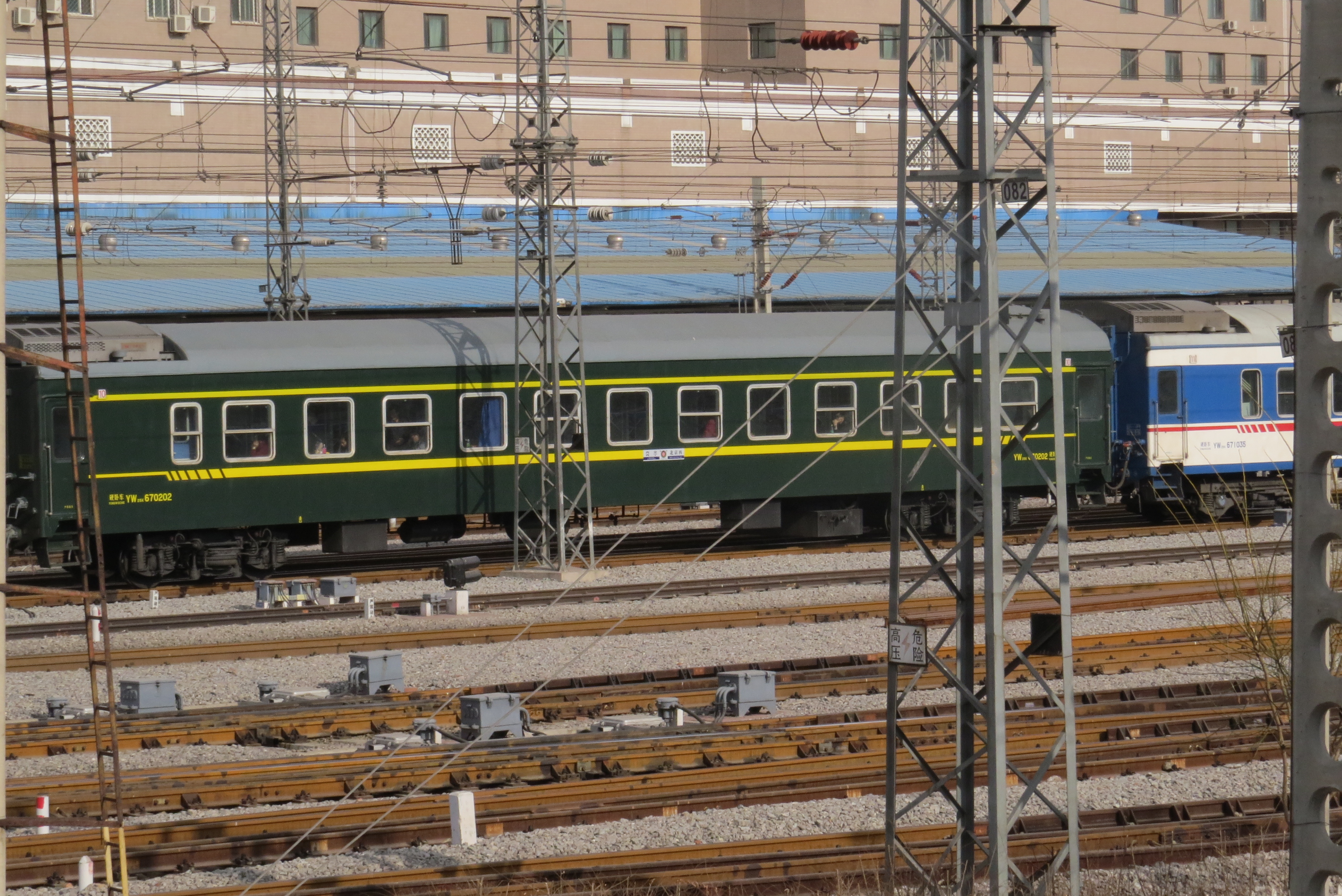
A Type 25K painted green

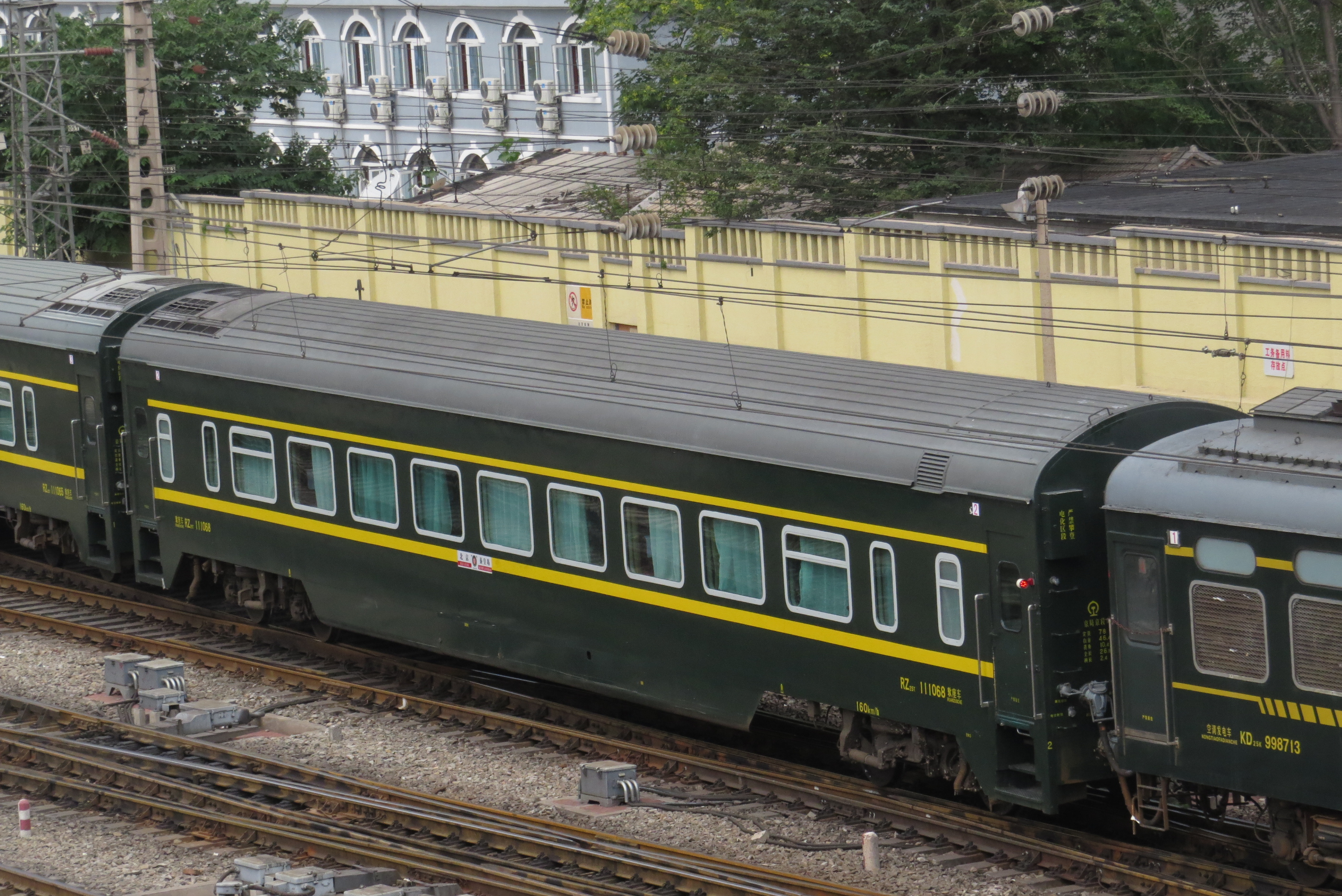
A Type 25T painted green

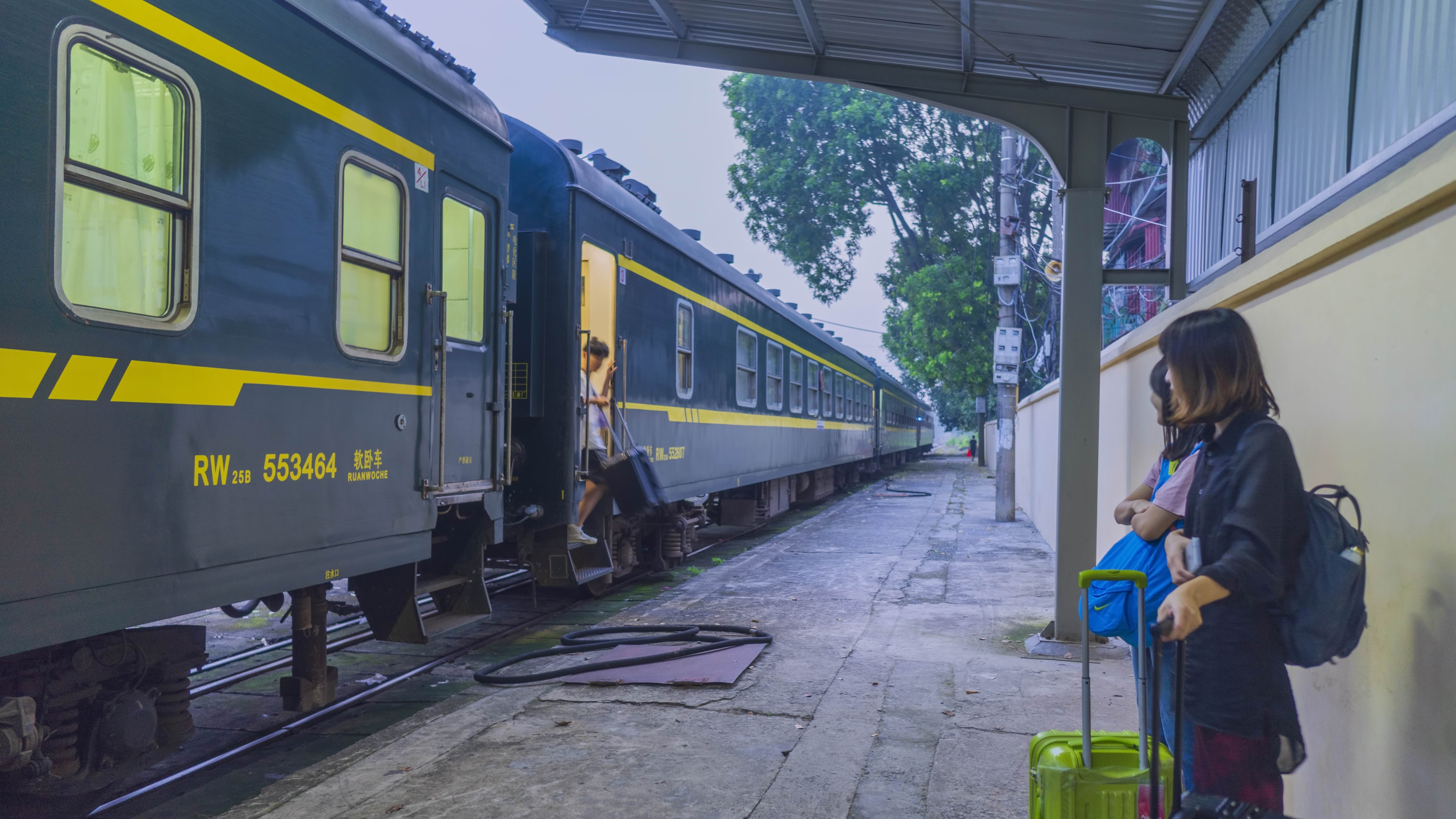
Type 25B (post-2014)

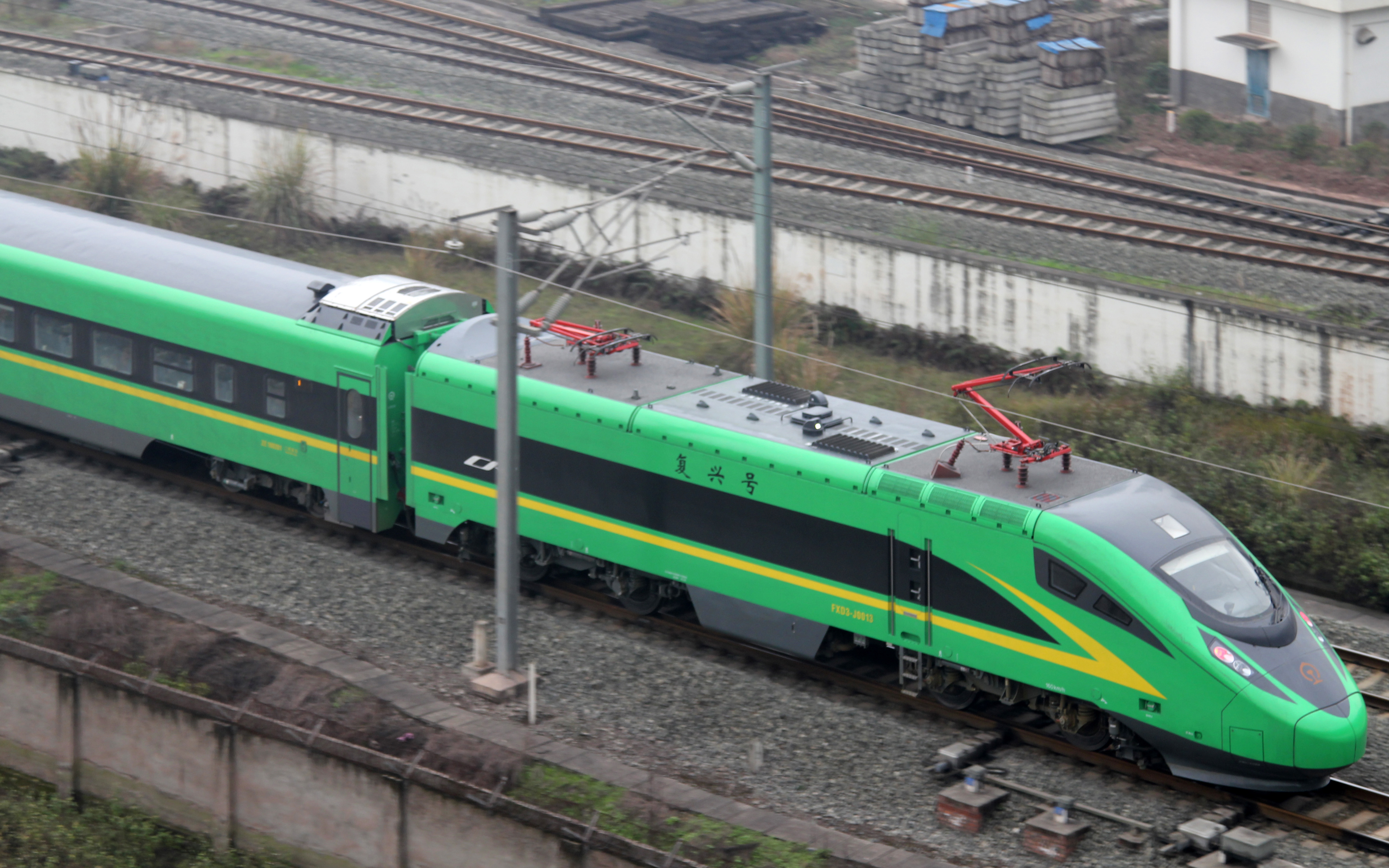
A CR200J higher-speed EMU, the first "bullet train" to be painted green during production

=== Other countries ===
==== Asia ====
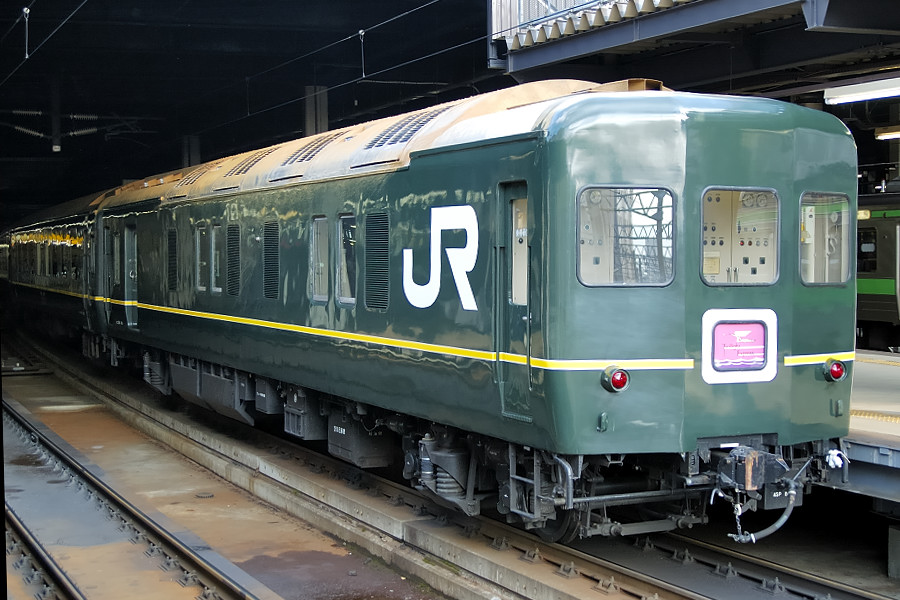
Japanese National Railways green train

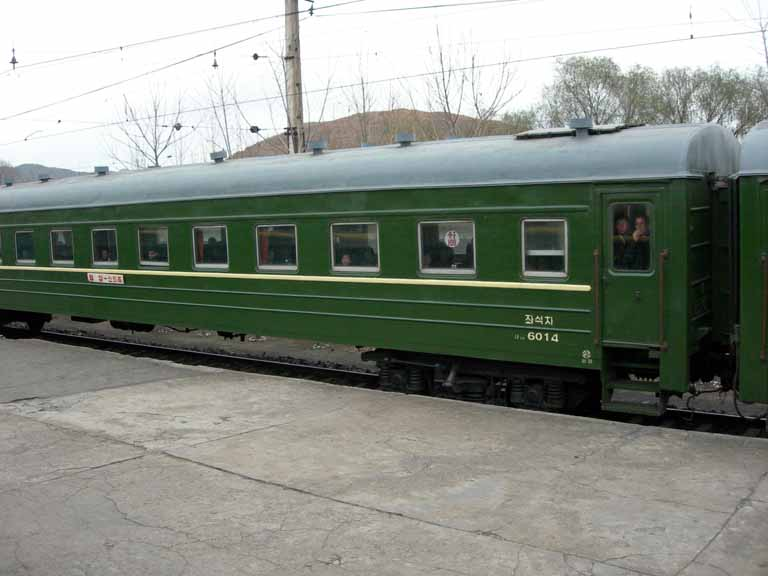
Korean State Railway green train

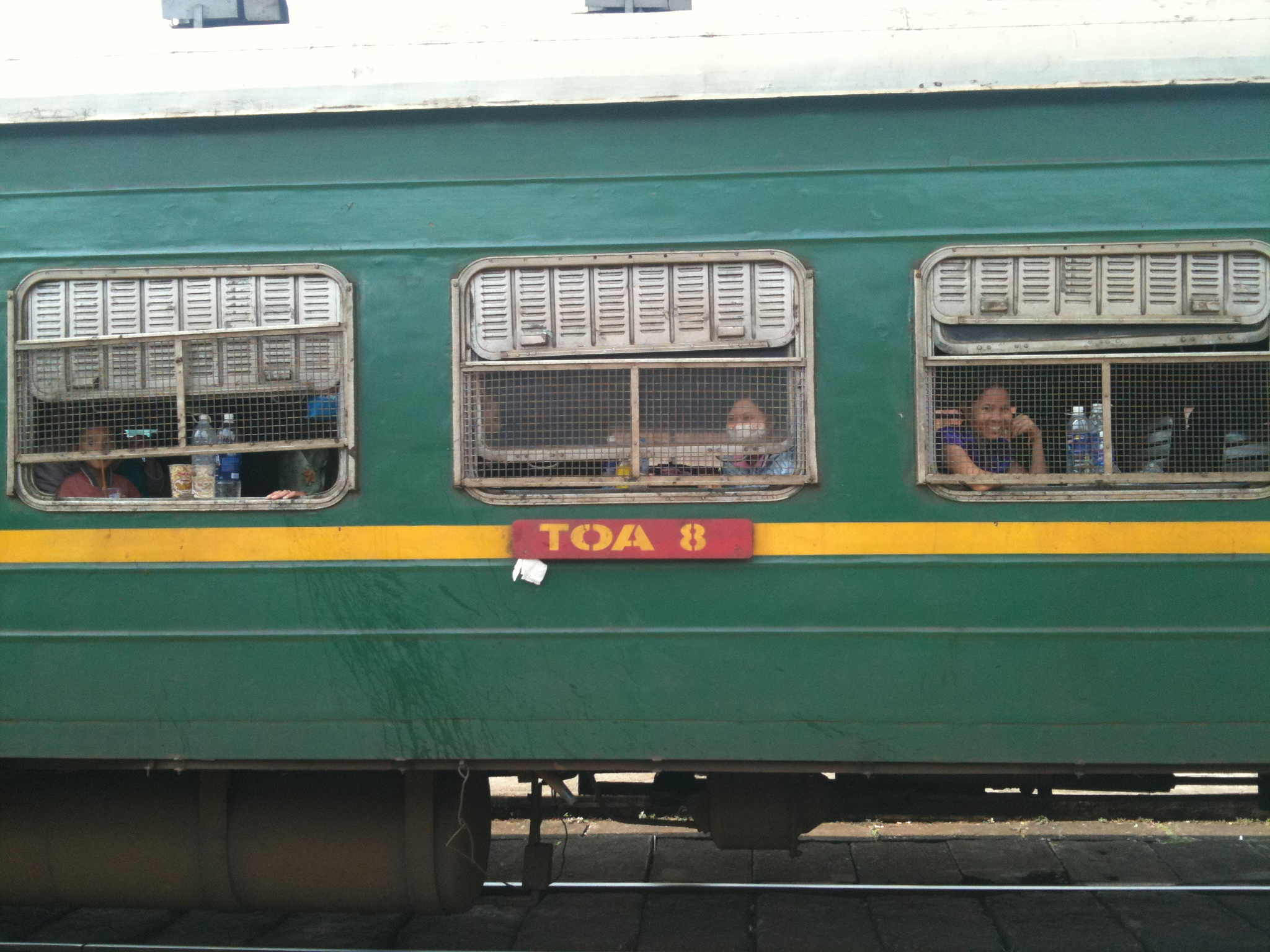
Vietnam Railways green train

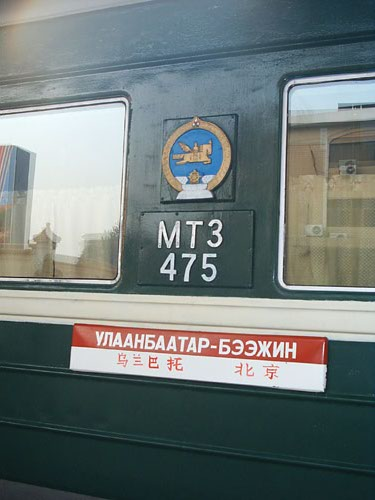
Mongolian green train

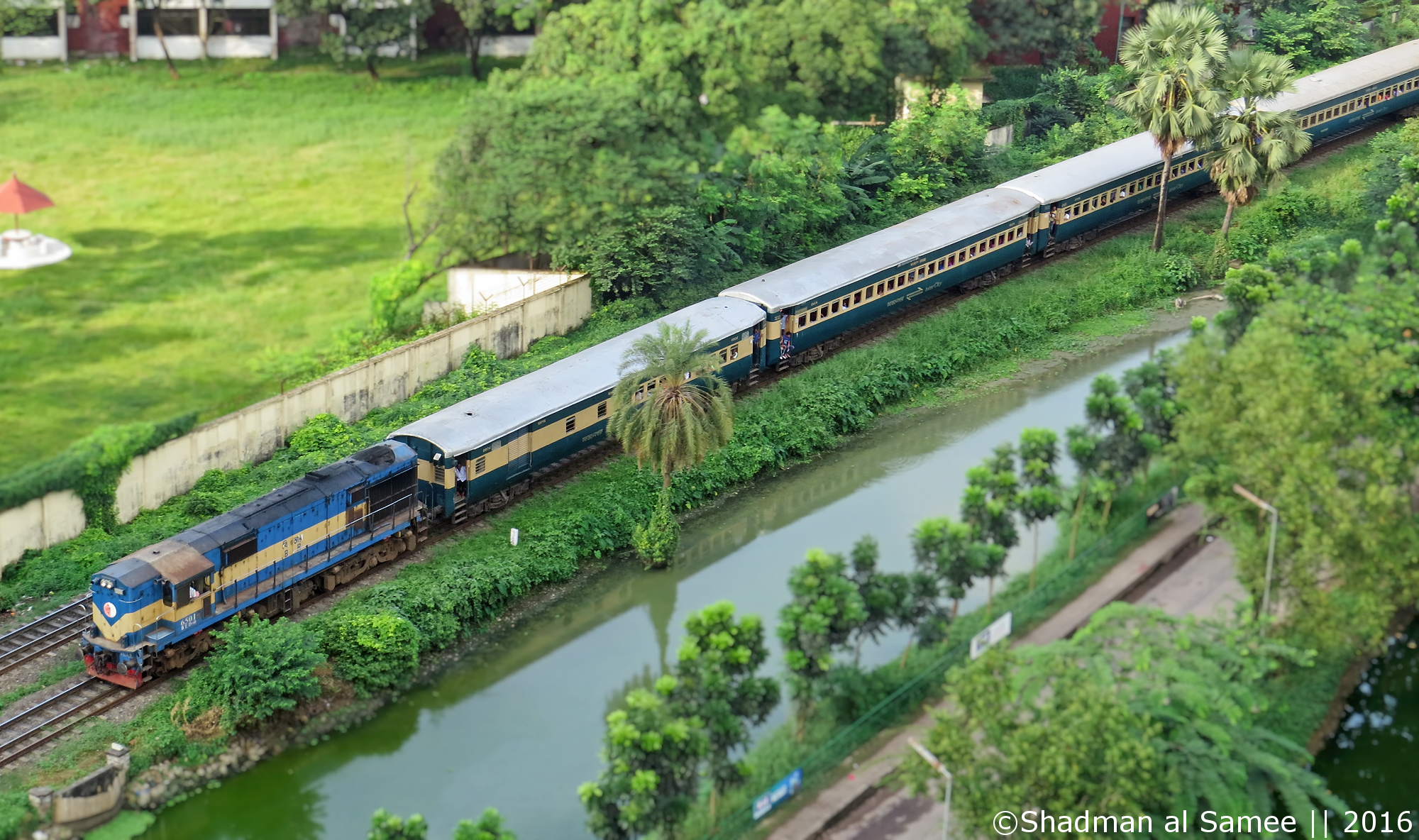
Bangladesh Railway green train

==== USSR ====
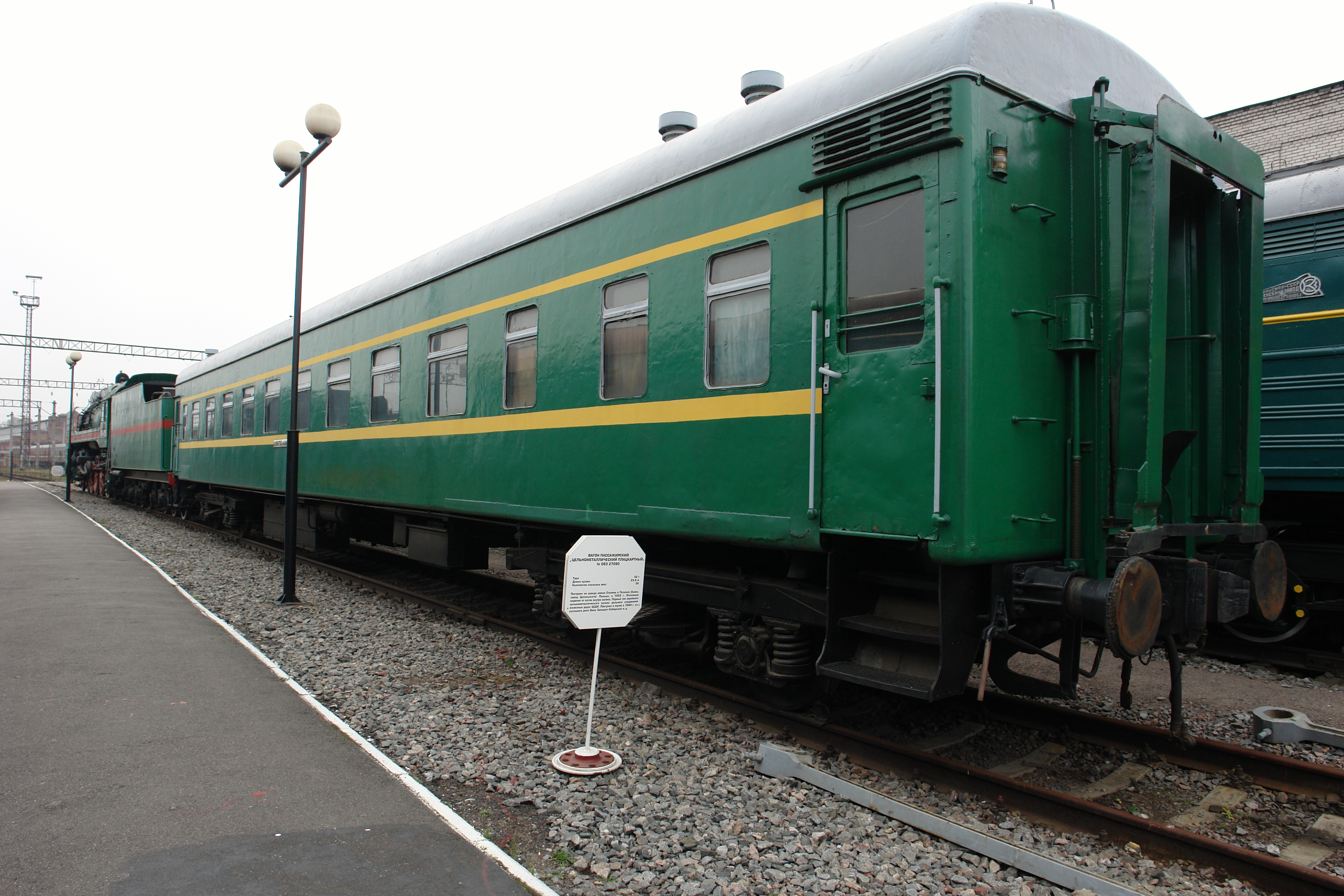
First generation green train in the USSR from 1953

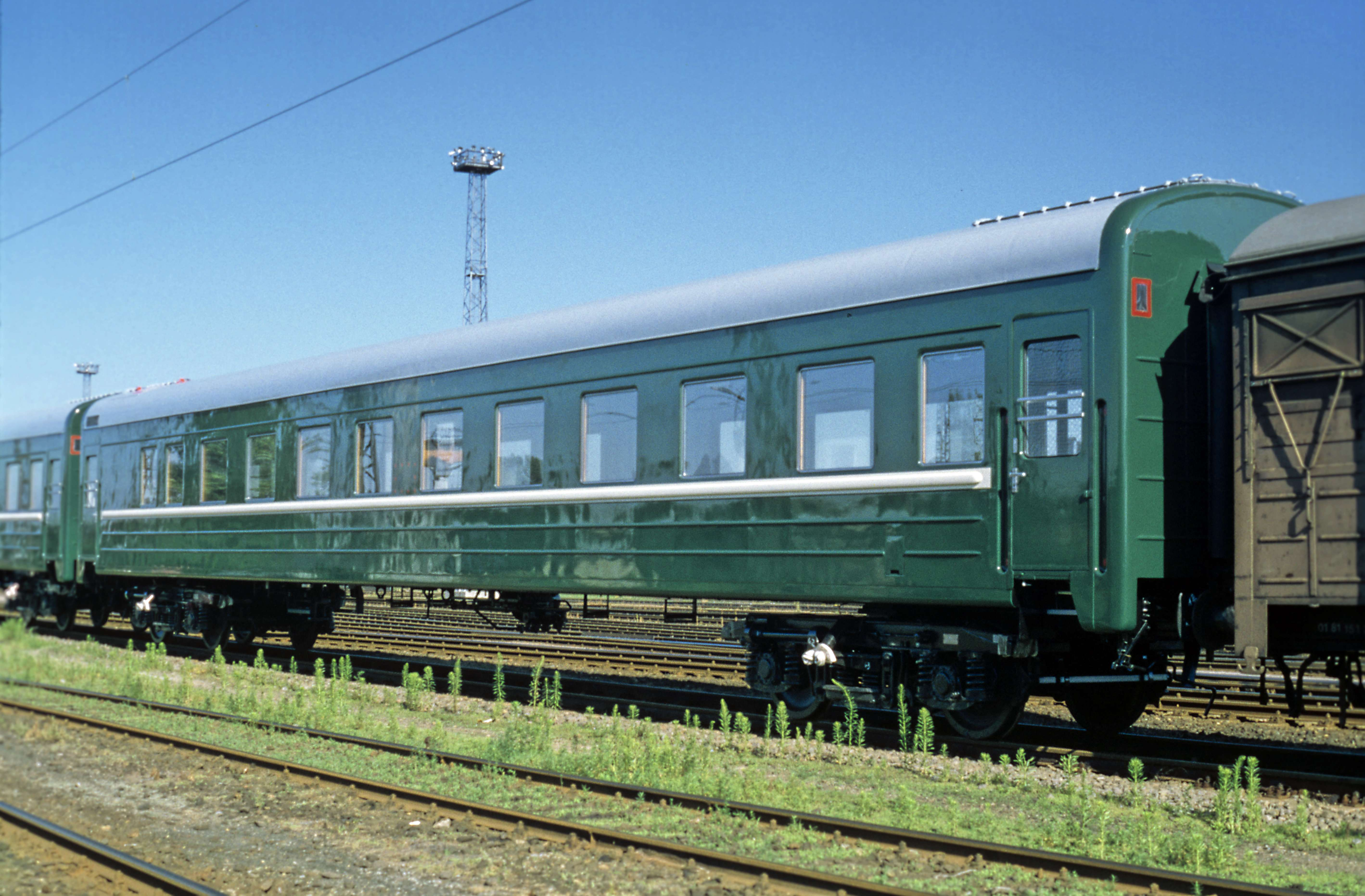
Later Soviet green train

==== Europe ====
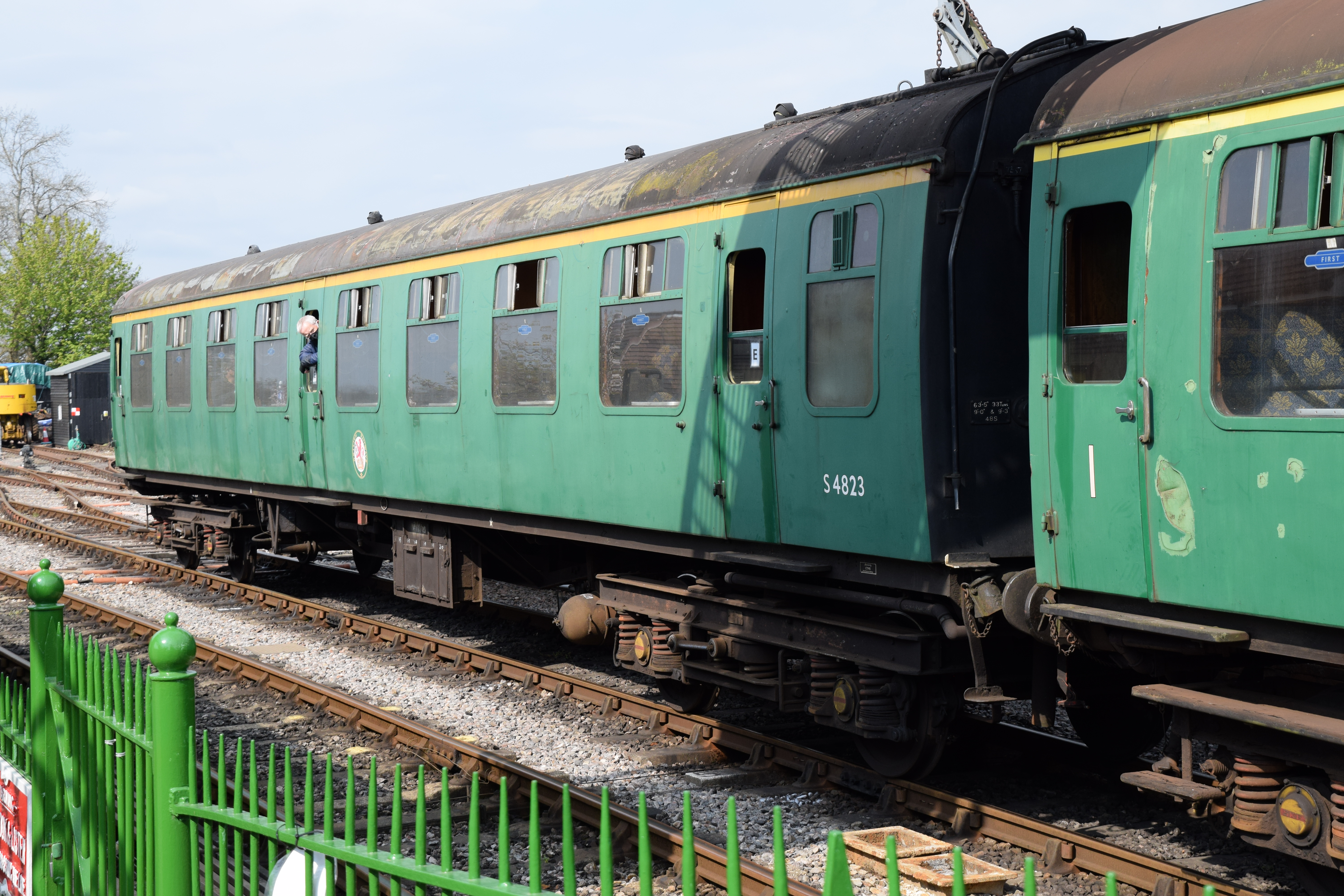
British Rail green train

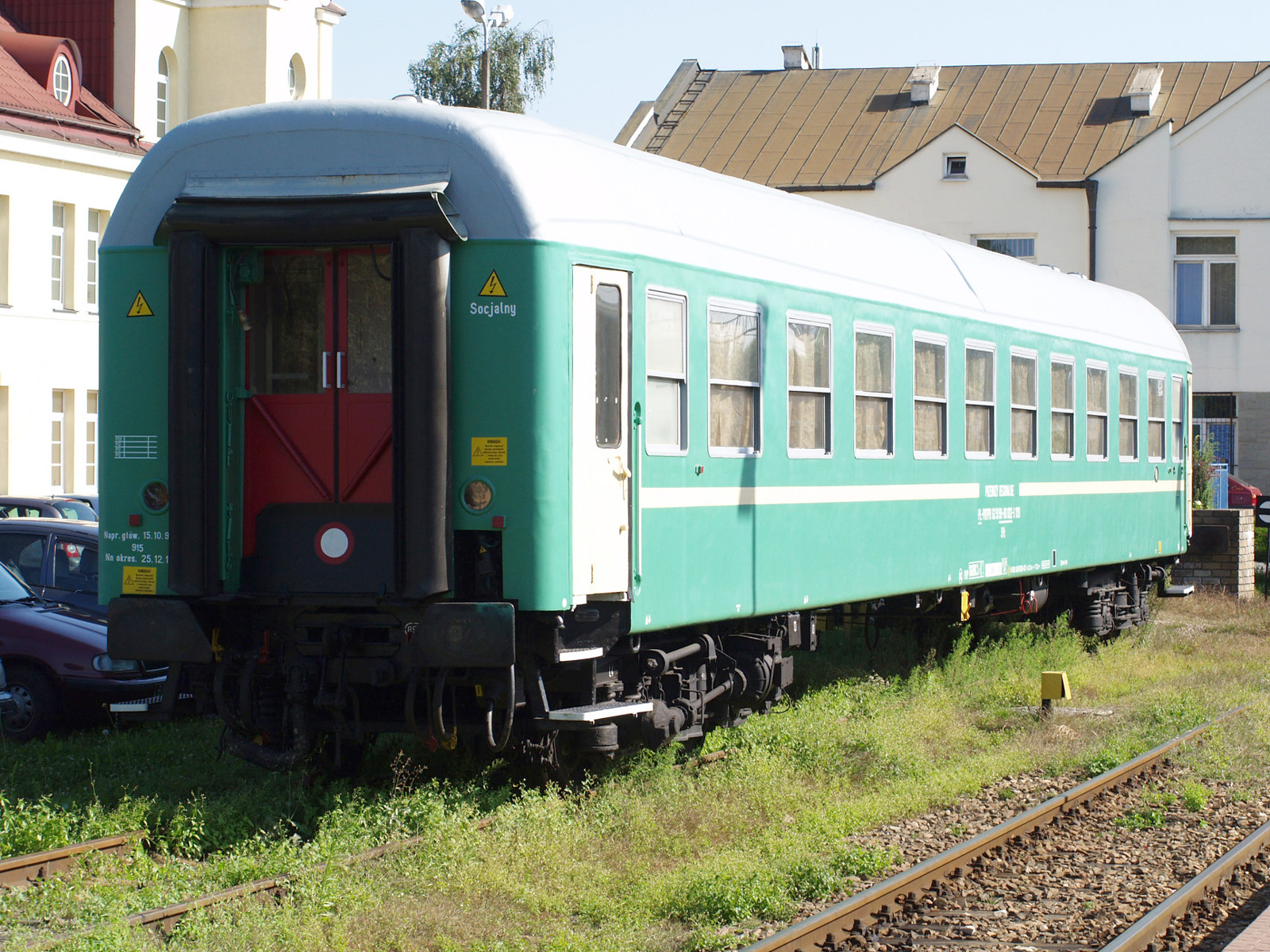
Polish State Railways green train

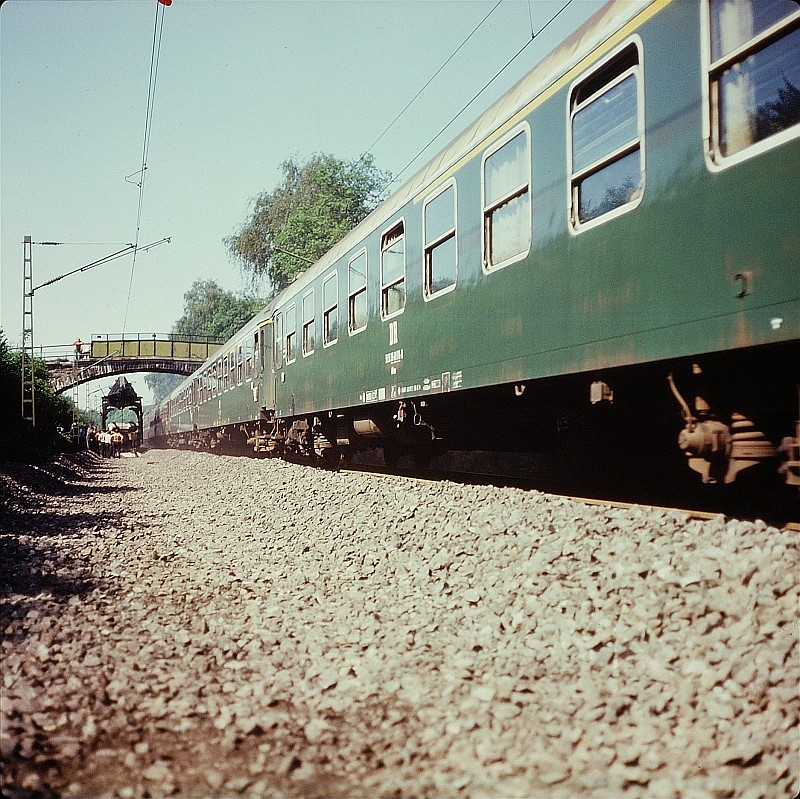
East German green train

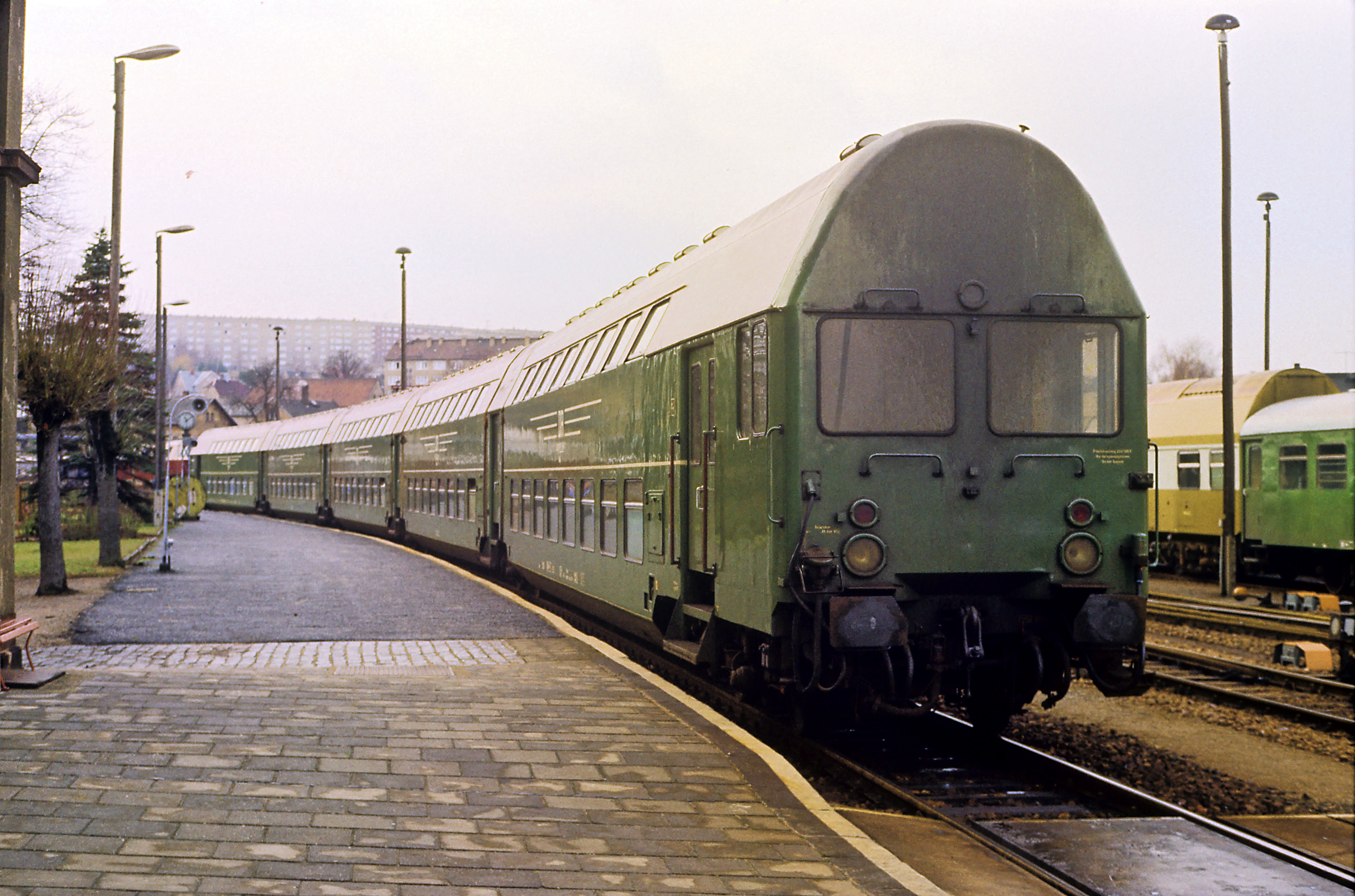
East German Double decker green train

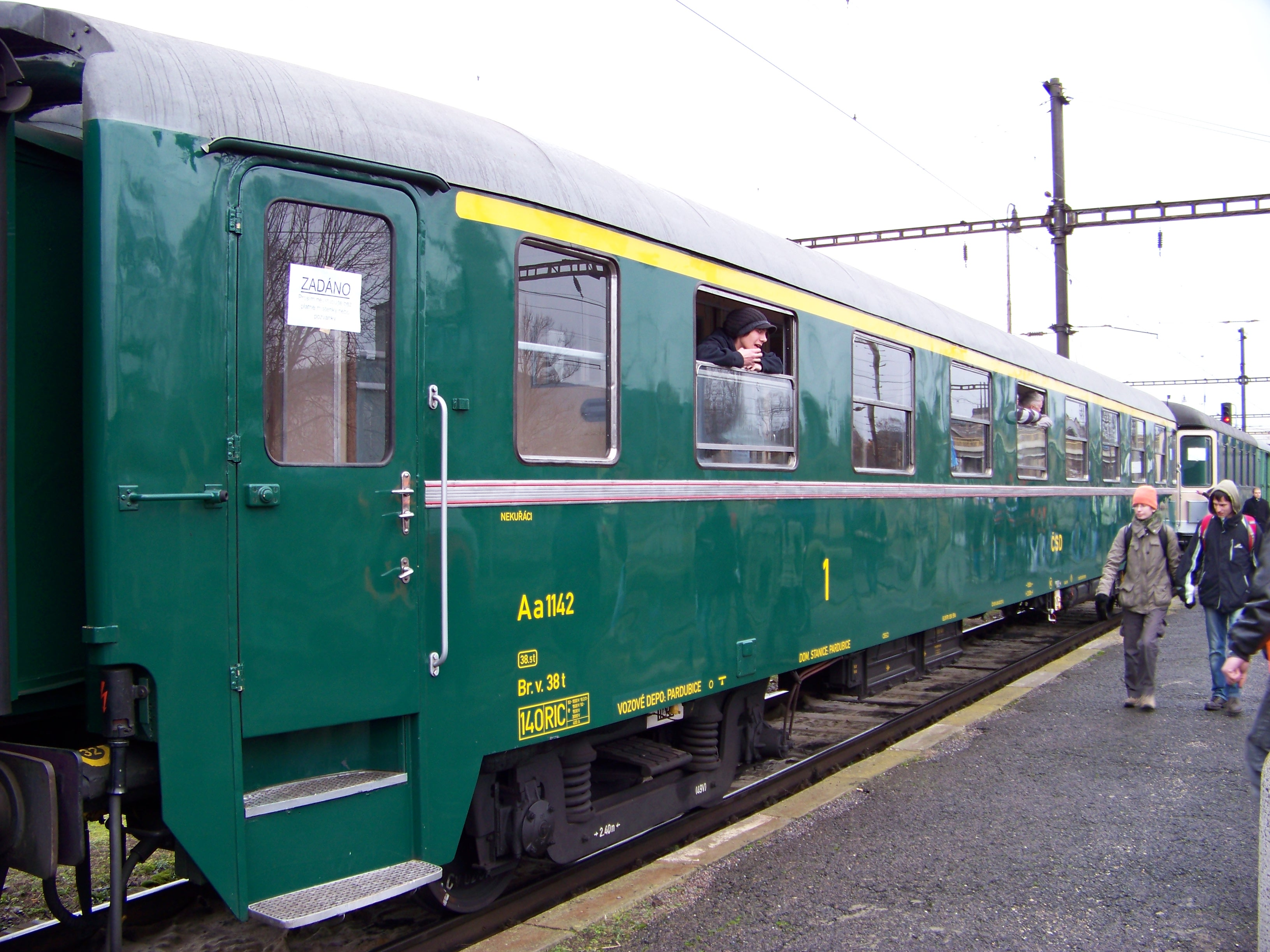
Czechoslovak State Railways green train

==== North America ====
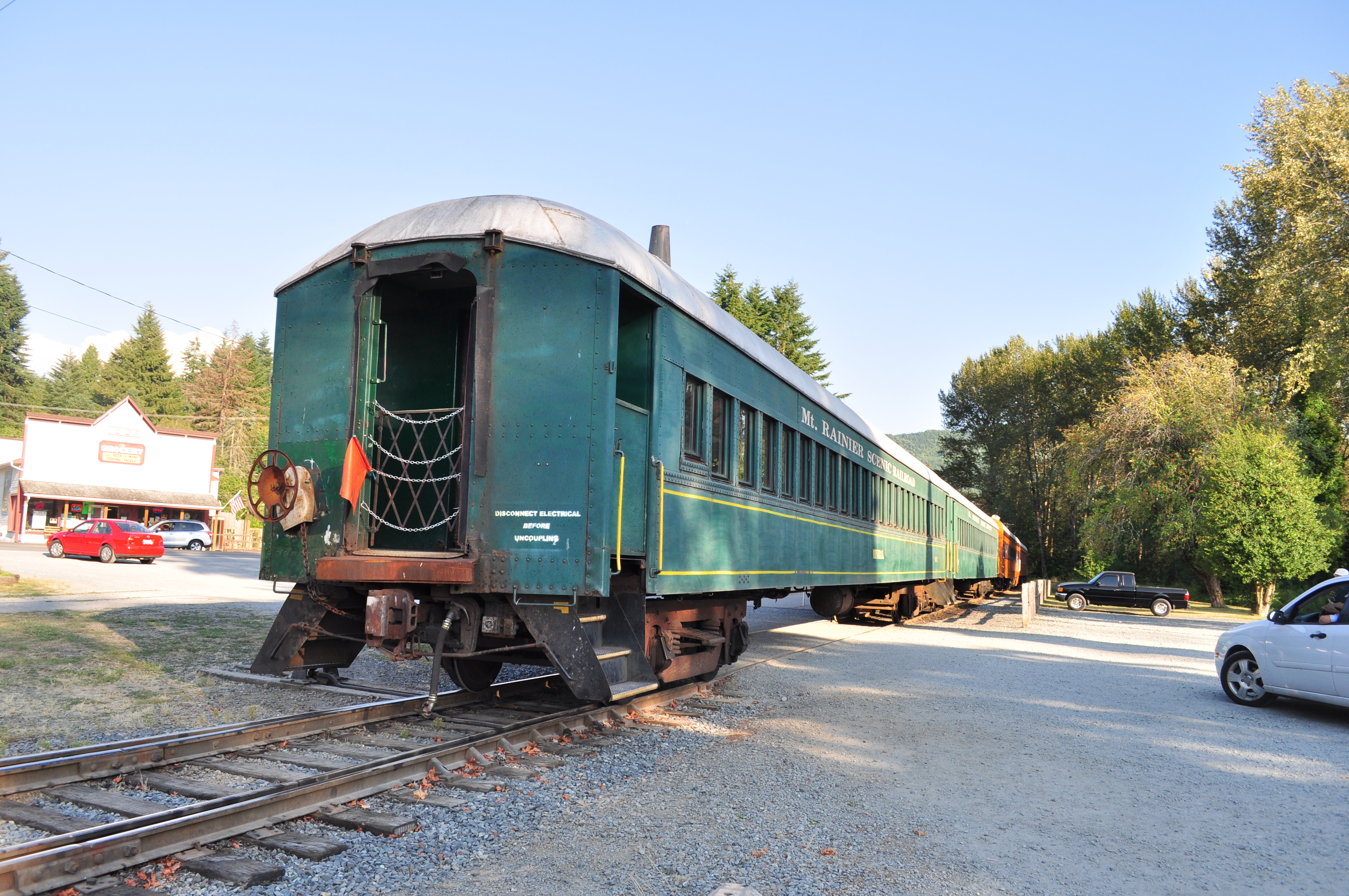
Mount Rainier Scenic Railroad green train

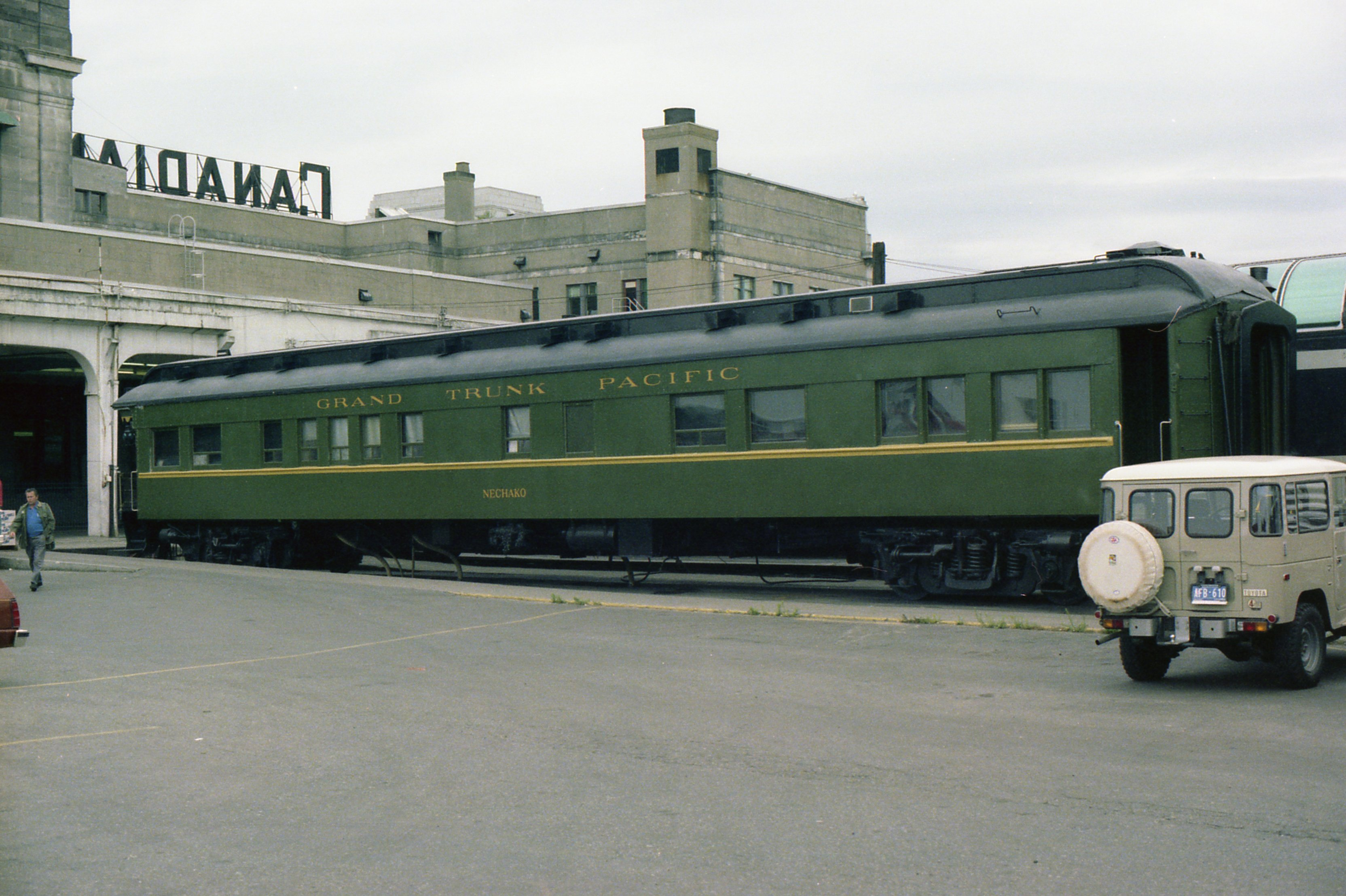
Grand Trunk Pacific Railway green train
