= Passenger rail transport in China =

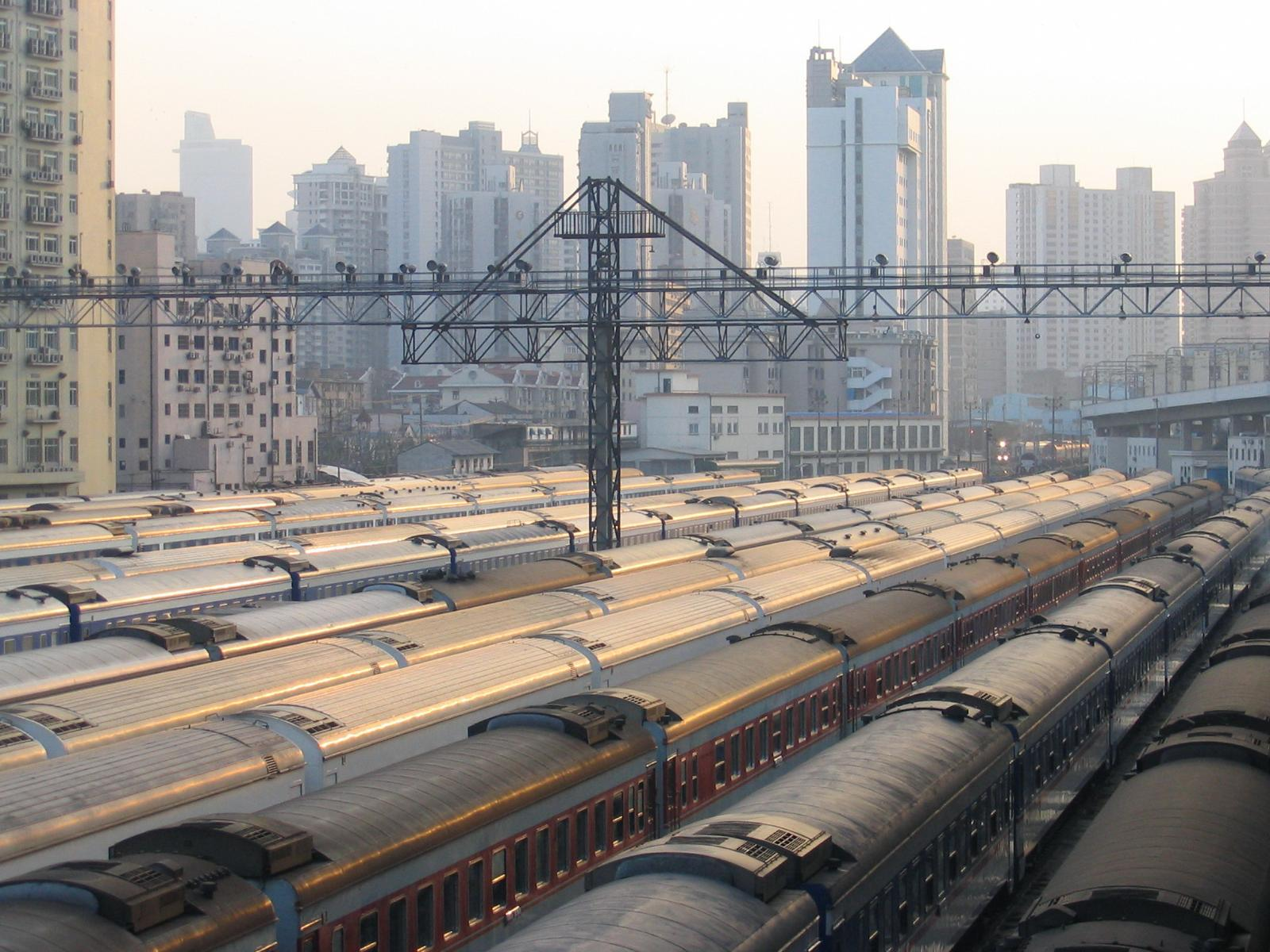
Passenger trains in Shanghai

Passenger rail transport is one of the principal means of transport in the People's Republic of China, with rail passenger traffic exceeding 1.86 billion railway trips in 2011. It is operated by the China Railway Corporation (CR). The Spring Festival Travel Season is the peak railway travel season of the year.

== Passenger train classes and route identifiers ==
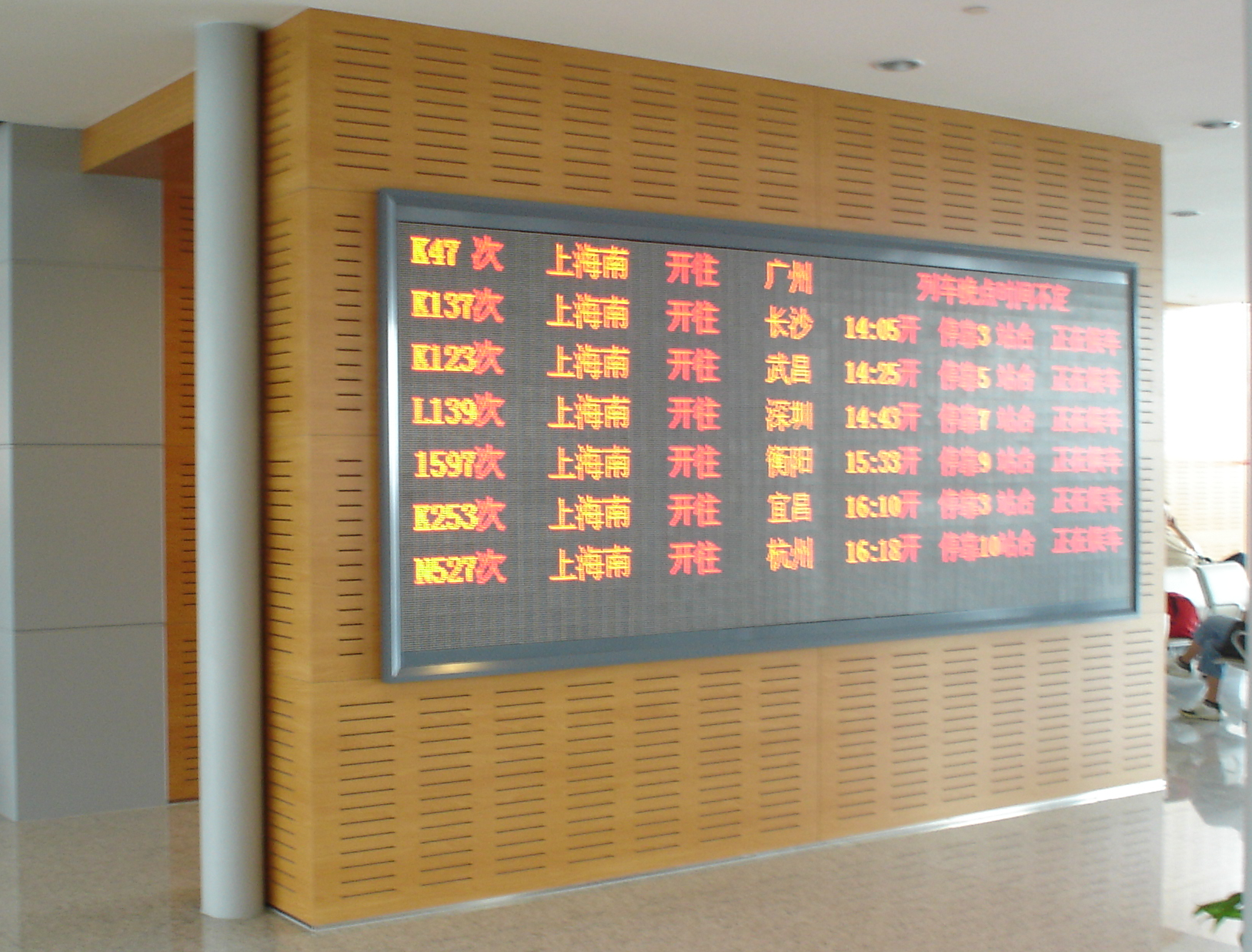
An electronic display board at Shanghai south railway station with a list of departures

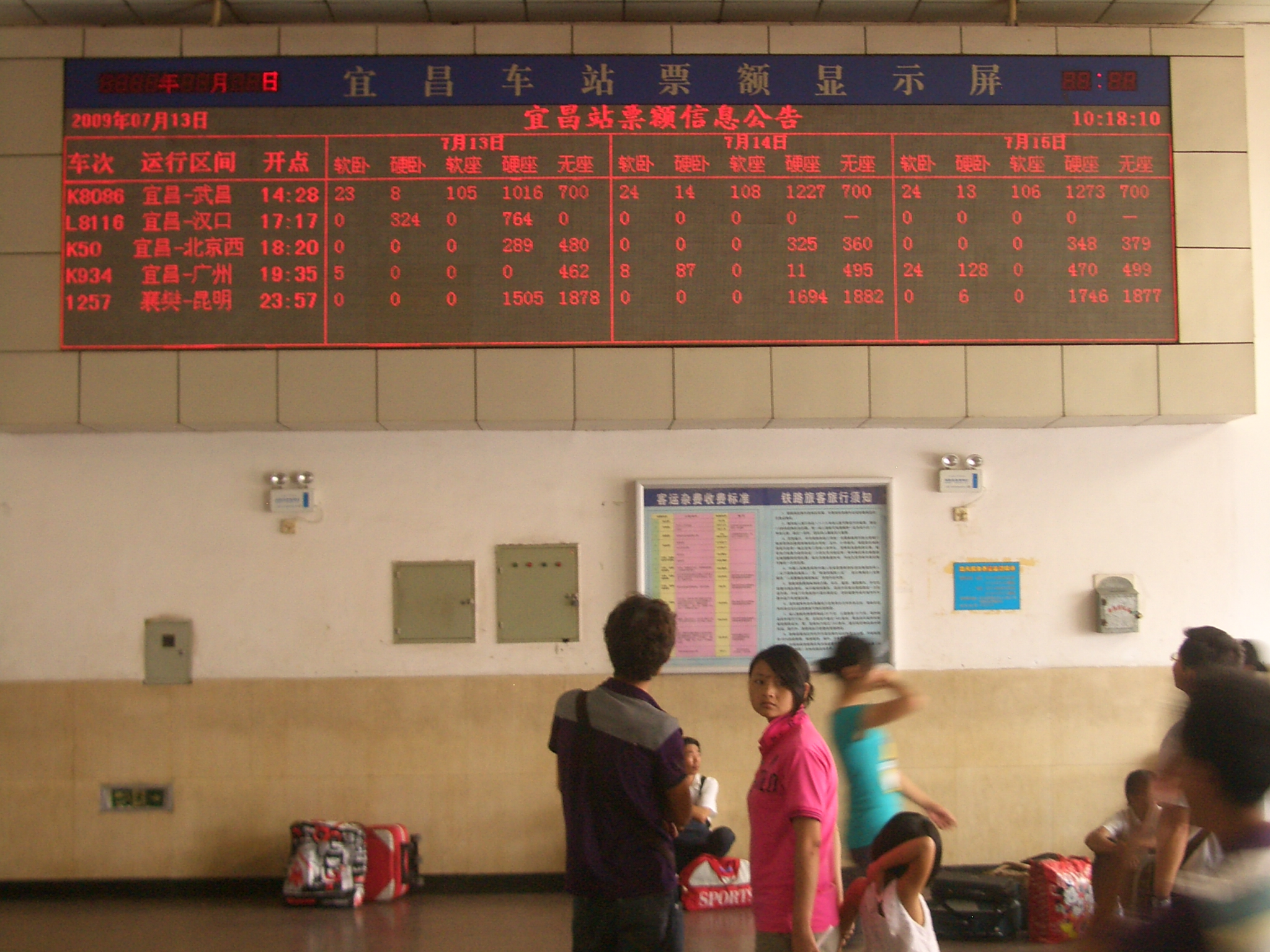
Ticket offices usually have display board showing availability of tickets on various trains in various classes, for a few days ahead. In the image shown above, the board shows data for a few K, L, and "general" trains. The great majority of seats available are in "hard seat" (often, "no seat", 无座) category

Every train route has an identification number of two to five characters arranged by the Ministry of Railways. The first character can be alphabetic or numeric, while the second to fifth characters are all numeric.

Trains are classified as either up (even-numbered) trains or down (odd-numbered) trains. Since the capital Beijing is treated as the focal point of the rail network, trains from Beijing are down services (e.g. the T109 from Beijing to Shanghai), while trains towards Beijing are up services (e.g. the T110 from Shanghai to Beijing).

Trains that do not go either to or from Beijing are similarly designated up or down based on whether the railway they are traveling on would eventually lead them away from or towards Beijing. For example, the Z90 from Guangzhou to Shijiazhuang is an up service as it travels from Guangzhou in the direction of Beijing, but terminates in Shijiazhuang before reaching the capital.

Some longer routes change from being an up service to a down service, or vice versa, mid-route, with more than one reversal being possible on the same route. In this case, the train would have two designations. For example, the G1202 and G1205 both refer to the same train from Harbin to Shanghai. From Harbin as far as Tianjin West Railway Station, the service is the G1202 up service traveling in the "up-direction" of the Beijing–Harbin High-Speed Railway towards Beijing, but after Tianjin West the train begins traveling away from Beijing down the Beijing–Shanghai High-Speed Railway towards Shanghai, becoming the G1205 in the process. Note that this is not to be confused with the G1208/G1205 from Qingdao to Harbin, which also switches at Tianjin West.

The Z31/Z34 from Wuchang to Ningbo is a more complicated example. It starts as the Z31 down service from Wuchang to Zhuji, traveling away from Beijing. At Zhuji, it becomes the Z34 up service towards Beijing. However, one stop later at Shaoxing, it reverts to being the Z31.

== Types ==
The leading letter in the route identifier indicates the train class, which is generally determined by top speed and stopping pattern.

On 16 October 2026, China railway announced it would to revise train-numbering system, and will be implemented in two batches in 25 November and late December. The types of train services available since 2026 include:

Designation (Translation)	Full designation in Chinese	Abbreviations	Route identifiers		Average maximal speed (km/h)
Designation (Translation)	Full designation in Chinese	Abbreviations	Preceding letter	Number range	Average maximal speed (km/h)
High-speed Passenger Train	高速旅客列车; gāosù lǚkè lièchē	新; Xīn	X	1 – 9998	above 350 (for Fuxing trains only)
High-speed Passenger Train	高速旅客列车; gāosù lǚkè lièchē	高; Gāo	G	1 – 9998	350 (for Fuxing trains only)
High-speed Passenger Train	高速旅客列车; gāosù lǚkè lièchē	特; Tè	T	1 – 9998	300
High-speed Passenger Train	高速旅客列车; gāosù lǚkè lièchē	快; Kuài	K	1 – 9998	200-250
Power-concentrated MU Passenger Train	动集旅客列车; dòngjí lǚkè lièchē	动; Dòng	D	1 – 9998	below 200
Intercity Passenger Train	城际旅客列车; chéngjì lǚkè lièchē	城; Chéng	C	1 – 2998	below 200
Suburban Passenger Train	市郊（域）旅客列车; shìjiāo(yù) lǚkè lièchē	市（郊）; Shì(jiāo)	S	1 – 2998	below 160
Express Passenger Train	快速旅客列车; kuàisù lǚkè lièchē	—N/a	Z	1 – 1998	160
Express Passenger Train	快速旅客列车; kuàisù lǚkè lièchē	—N/a	N	1 – 1998	140
Express Passenger Train	快速旅客列车; kuàisù lǚkè lièchē	—N/a	V	1 – 5998	below 120
Standard Rapid	普通旅客快车; pǔtōng lǚkè kuàichē	—N/a	V	6001 – 6998	below 120
Standard stopping	普通旅客慢车; pǔtōng lǚkè mànchē	—N/a	V	7001 – 7998	below 120
Tourist special train	普速旅游专线列车; pǔsù lǚyóu zhuānxiàn lièchē	游; Yóu	Y	1 – 998	—N/a
Tourist train	普速旅游列车; pǔsù lǚyóu zhuānxiàn lièchē	游; Yóu	Y	1001 – 9998	—N/a

=== CRH trains ===
The high-speed rail (HSR, 高铁; Gāotiě) network in China is the world's longest and most extensively used. The network encompasses newly built rail lines with a design speed of 200 to 380 km/h (120 to 240 mph). The network accounts for two-thirds of the world's total high-speed railway networks. Almost all trains, tracks and services are owned and operated by the China Railway Corporation under the brand China Railway High-speed (CRH).

==== G ("Gaosu Dongche", 高速动车; High Speed EMU Train) ====
This class mostly consists of long-distance high-speed trains. These are generally the fastest services available and their top speed can be up to 350 km/h (217 mph), but a considerable portion of the network only allows for travel speeds under 320 km/h (200 mph). G1–G5998 is used for services running through multiple railway bureaux, while G6001–G9998 is used for those running within one railway bureau. G trains usually do not run overnight and thus have no sleeper car.

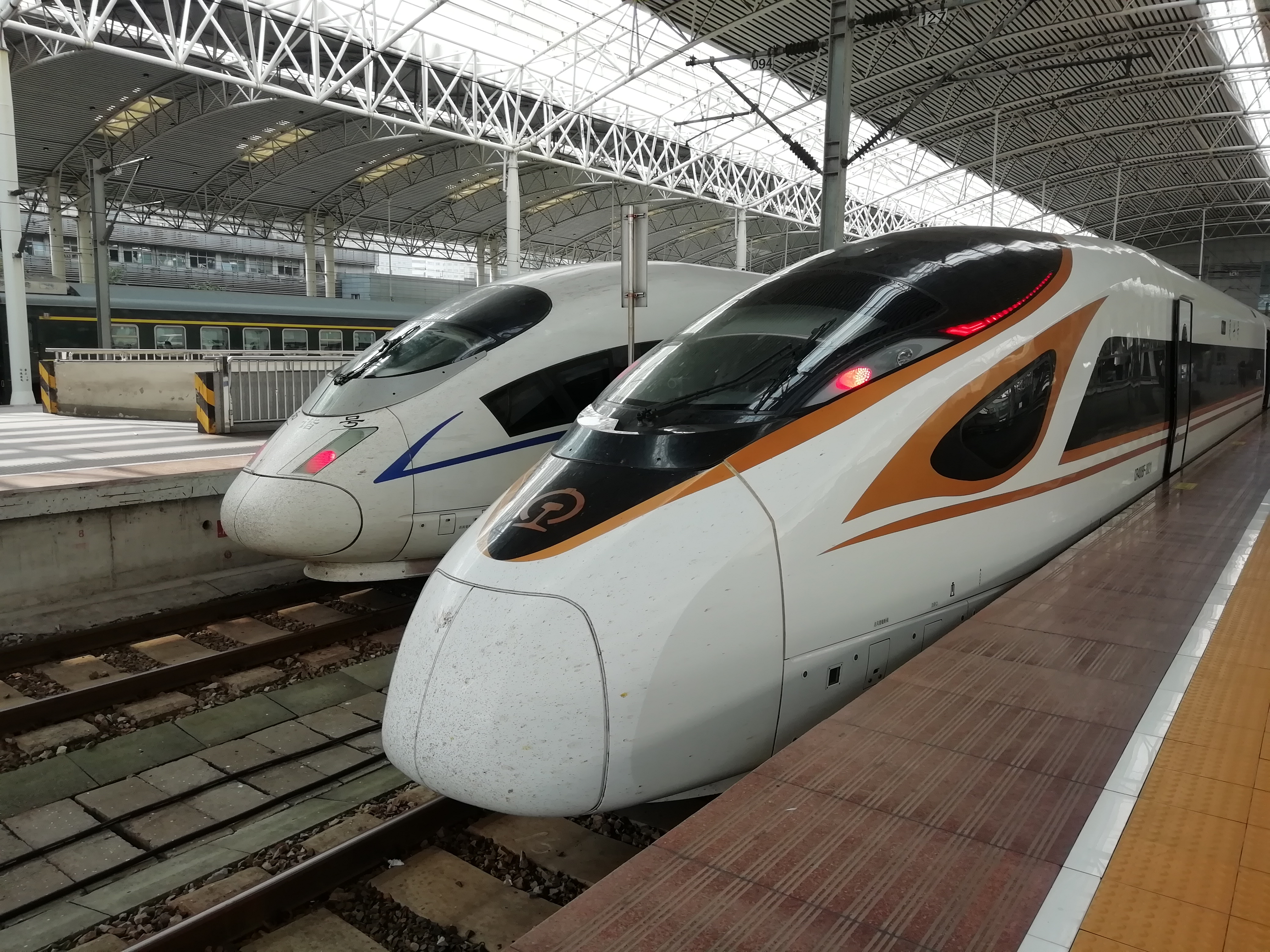
CRH380B EMU and CR400BF EMU in Shanghai railway station

==== D ("Dongche", 动车; EMU Train) ====
This class was introduced after the sixth rise in speed of the railway on 18 April 2007. Their top speed is usually limited to 200–250 km/h. These services are run using CRH series electric multiple units (EMUs) named "Harmony" (和谐号; Héxiéhào). The designations D1–D3998 are used for services running through multiple railway bureaux, while the designations D4001–D9998 for those running within one railway bureau. D services can run on high-speed lines, upgraded conventional lines or even over conventional railways at conventional speeds for a portion of their journey to connect some cities off the high-speed network.

D services provide relatively fastfand requent service between main cities in China. For example:

- Beijing–Shijiazhuang (Approximately 2 hours travel time), Taiyuan (3 hours), Handan (3–3.5 hours), Zhengzhou (5 hours).
- Xiamen–Shenzhen (3.5 hours)
- Shanghai–Nanjing (2 hours), Hangzhou (1.5 hours), some continuing to destinations beyond such as Zhengzhou and Hankou.

Furthermore, a few other nighttime D trains also run on longer routes, such as the services between Shanghai and Beijing.

==== C ("Chengji Dongche", 城际动车; Intercity EMU Train) ====
This class was introduced after 1 August 2008 with the opening of the Beijing-Tianjin Intercity. They are usually EMU services within a metropolitan region, and usually run within one railway bureau. The top speed is 350 km/h (220 mph) (e.g. Beijing-Tianjin) but many run at speeds from 200 to 160 km/h. The designations C1–C1998 are used for trains running through multiple railway bureaux, the designations C2001–C9998 for those running within one railway bureau. Some of these services serve the purpose of commuter trains to or from satellite cities surrounding major urban centres or from downtown to the airport, as in Lanzhou.

=== Classic Rail trains ===
The classic rail network (普速铁路; Pǔsù tiělù), also known as conventional rail, forms the backbone of China's railway system alongside the high-speed rail (HSR) network. These traditional railway lines operate at speeds below 160 km/h (99 mph) and serve a dual role in transporting both passengers and freight. Unlike the high-speed CRH services, whose tracks are primarily dedicated and electrified, classic rail consists of older lines that may be single or double-tracked, with varying degrees of electrification.

Historically, the slower classic rail trains were in olive green livery, leading to the nickname "green train" (绿皮火车; Lǜpí huǒchē) to be used colloquially. Since 2014, most carriages that were in other colours (white, red, blue) have been repainted olive-green. Classic Rail trains are also sometimes referred to as "slow trains" in English.

Classic rail trains have significantly lower ticket prices compared to CRH trains and are a popular choice with travellers on a budget.

==== D ("Dongche", 动车; Electric Multiple Units) ====
The 'D' trains operating on classic railway lines, unlike those running on high-speed lines, have an operational speed of 160 km/h rather than 200-250 km/h (the yet-to-be-procured CR220J will operate at 200 km/h). They feature passenger car interiors largely similar to high-speed trains, including newly designed sleeper cars. These services are designed to gradually replace the existing Z-series trains and may potentially replace the T-series trains in the future.

D trains on classic railways are operated by the CR200J Fuxing electric multiple units, which utilize a centralized power configuration.

==== Z ("Zhida", 直达; Non-Stop Express) ====
'Z' trains, despite their name (直达; Zhídá) technically implying a "non-stop" overnight train, sometimes stop several times before reaching their destination. The majority have both soft sleepers and hard sleepers, while some Z trains have only soft sleepers. The top speed is 160 km/h. The designations Z1-Z9998 are distributed without regard to the number of railway bureaux entered. Z trains are typically served by the 25T train coaches.

This class was introduced with the fifth rise in speed of the railway on 18 April 2004. In the early years (2004–2006), all but one pair of Z services had either Beijing or Beijing West station as their destination or origin. As of 2009, Z-series trains also operated along the Yangtze Valley as well, providing overnight services from Wuhan to Shanghai, Hangzhou, Ningbo and Shenzhen.

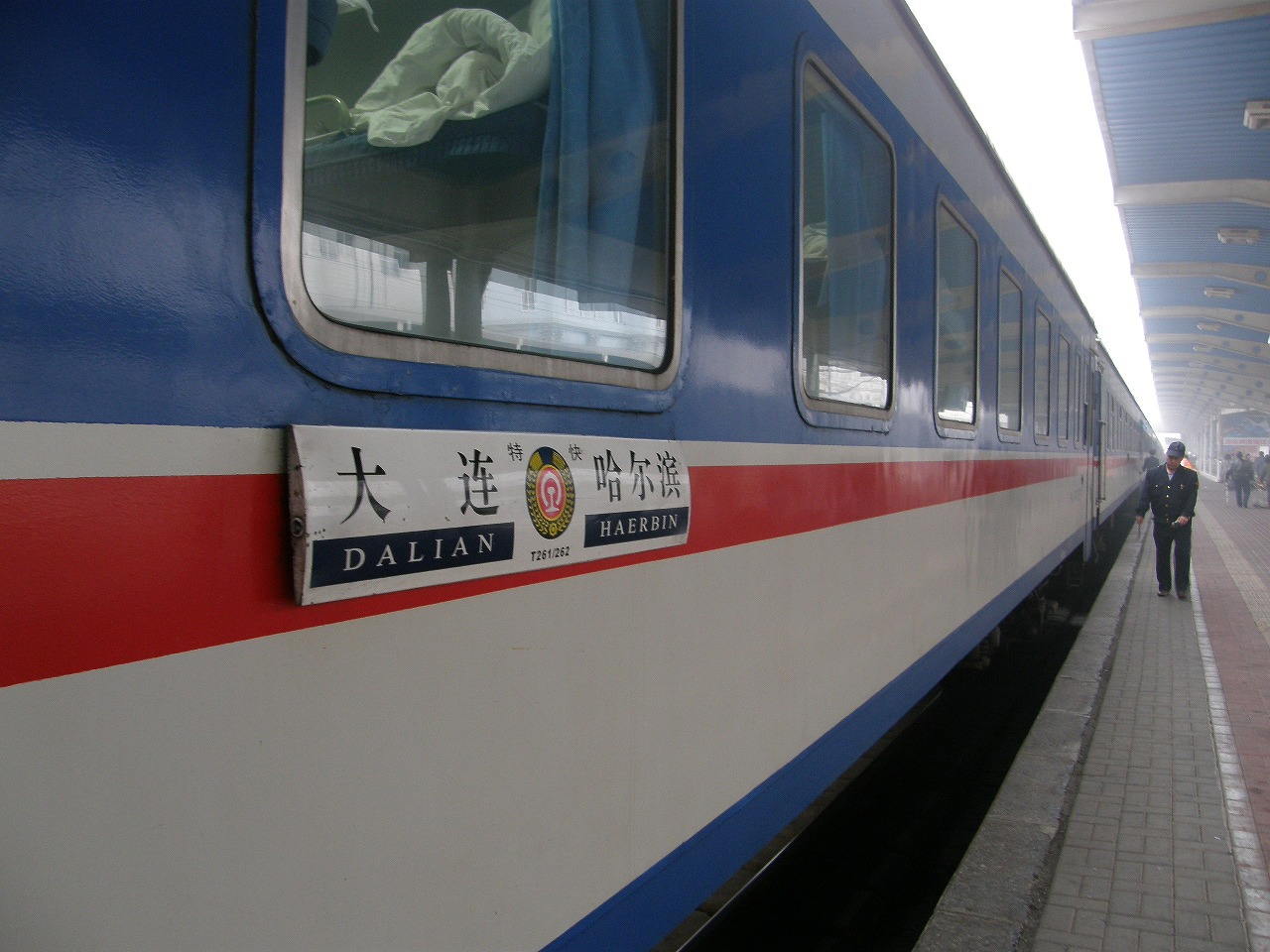
An express train running between Harbin and Dalian

==== T ("Tekuai", 特快; Limited Express) ====
The T (特; Tè) class trains have a limited number of stops along their routes, usually only in major cities, or in some instances stops for switching the driver or locomotive. The top speed is 140 km/h. The designations T1–T4998 are used for services running in multiple railway bureaux, while T5001–T9998 are used for those running within one railway bureau.

T class trains are typically served by the 25K train coaches, which have a top speed of 140 km/h.

==== K ("Kuaisu", 快速; Express) ====
The K (快; Kuài) class trains stop at more stations than those of the T series do. Their top speed is 120 km/h. The designations K1–K6998 are used for trains running in multiple railway bureaux, while K7001 to K9998 are used for trains running within one railway bureau. K trains are typically served by the 25G train coaches.

After April 18, 2004, N class trains, which represent fast trains travelling exclusively within one railway bureau, were derived from the K class. Then, all K class trains would travel on lines operated by more than one railway bureau. After 1 April 2009, all N-class trains were given K designations again.

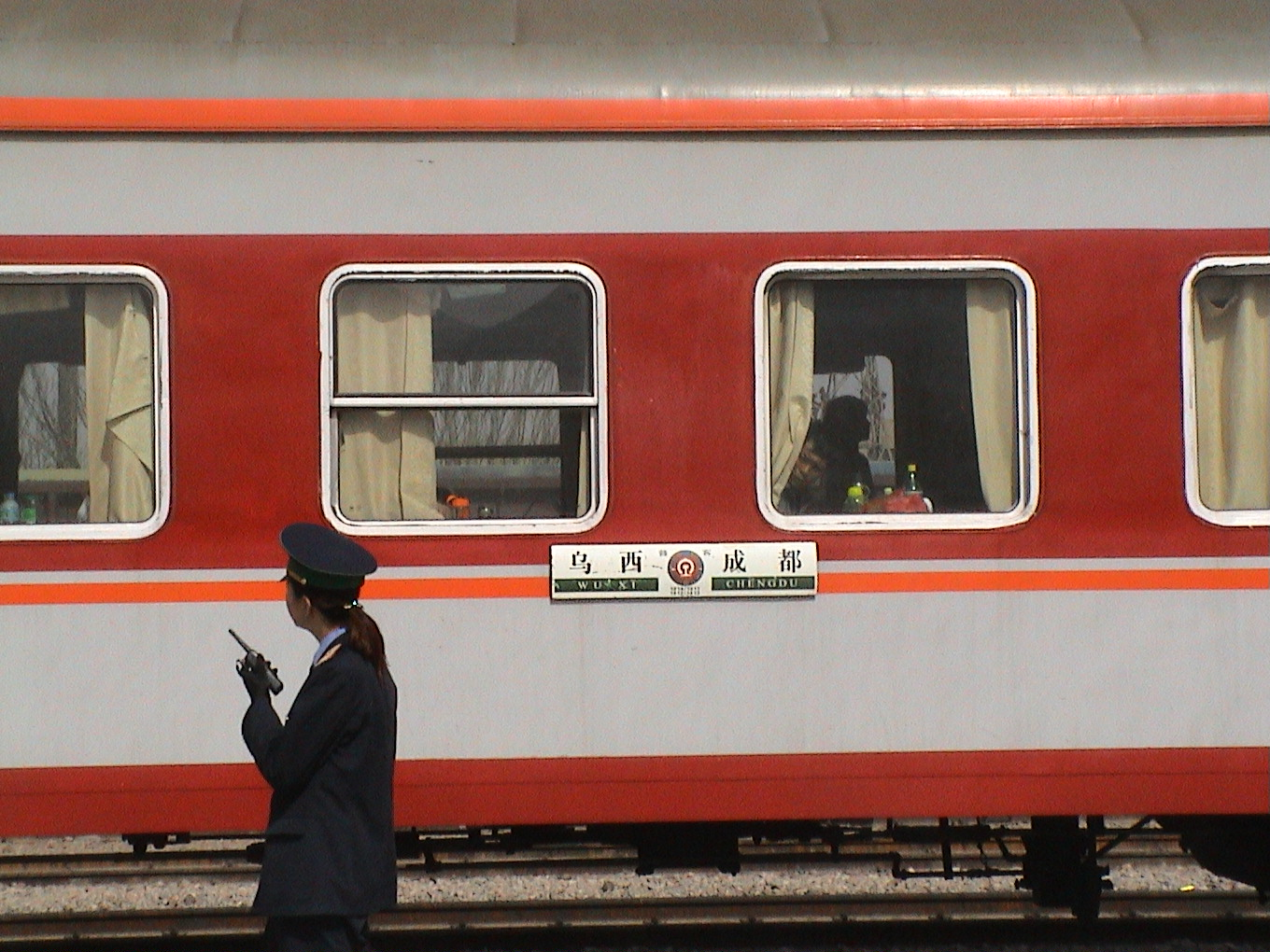
An air-conditioned General Fast Train from Chengdu to Ürümqi West

==== General Fast Train ====
General fast trains (普通旅客快车, which can be shortened to 普快, Pukuai) are slower passenger trains that stop at around half of the stations along the way, resulting in a longer travel time than the fast trains. The top speed is 120 km/h. Route numbers are always four numeric digits—a numeric prefix from 1-5 followed by a 3-digit route number. Numbers 1001–1998 for the trains running through three or more railway bureaus, 2001–3998 for the trains running through two railway bureaus, and 4001–5998 for the trains that run in only one railway bureau.

==== General Train ====
The general train (普通旅客列车, which can be shortened to 普客, Puke) has as many stops as possible, and is often the preferred choice for rural workers to visit their home villages because of low ticket price. This is the slowest type of train and has the lowest priority in the Fixed Train Timetable (图定列车). The top speed is 100 km/h. These trains are often the only available transportation in rural area lacking highway infrastructures, but is gradually being phased out in favour of faster trains.

Route identifiers for general trains are always 4 digits—a numeric prefix from 6-7 followed by a 3-digit route number. 6001–6198 are used for the trains that run in more than one railway bureau, while 7001–7598 will be used for the trains that run in only one railway bureau.

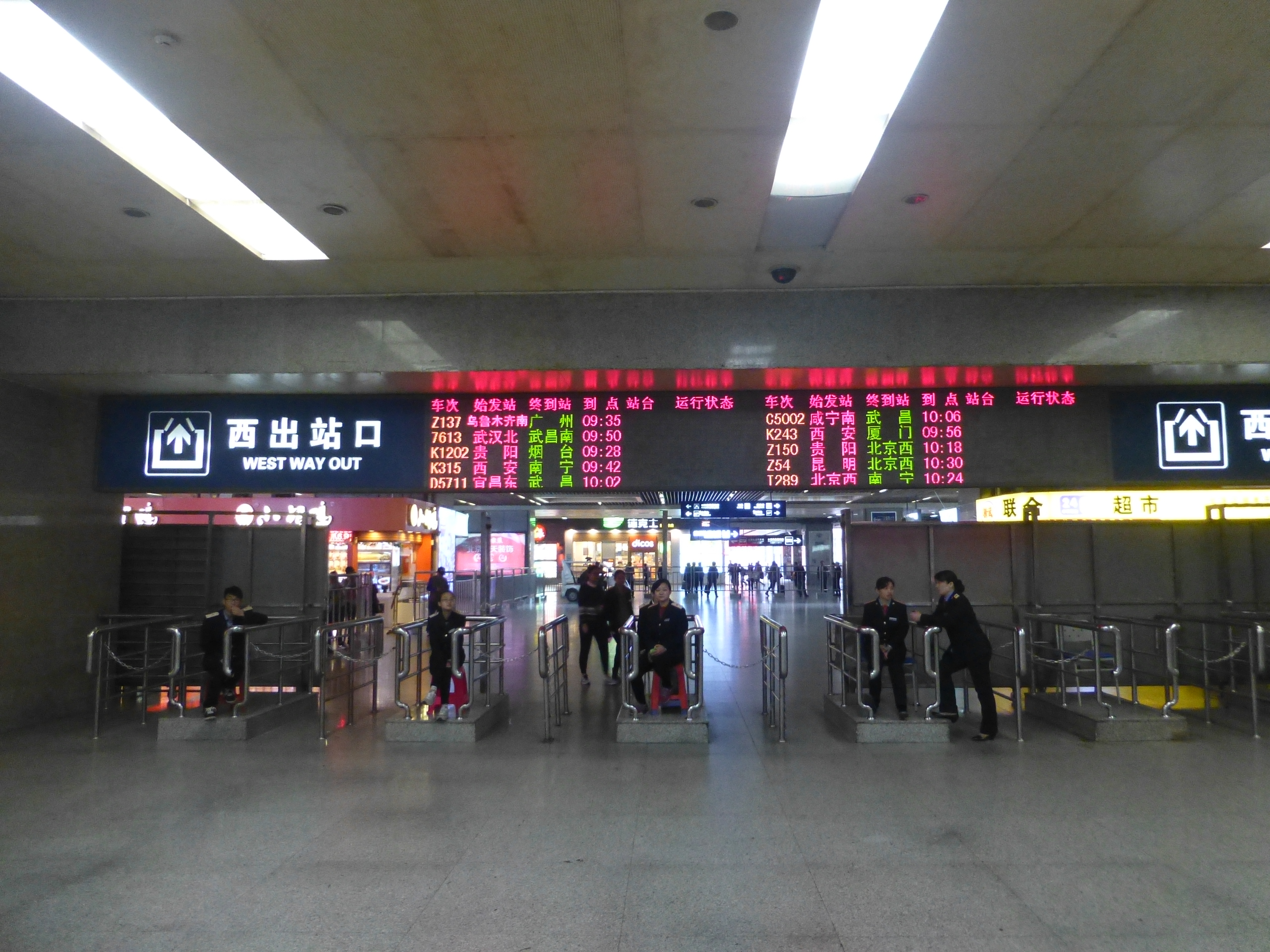
A Wuhan North-Wuchang South employee commuter train (No. 7613) makes a rare appearance in the arrival announcement board at Wuchang Railway Station. Although the service has been operating since 2010, the train - or either of its terminals - have never been listed in the reservation systems accessible to general public.

==== Commuter Train ====
The commuter train usually runs for railway staff to commute or consult their doctor, but also takes their children to school and brings them back in some areas. Generally tickets for such a kind of train are not available for passengers. Route identifiers for commuter trains are 4 digits with a range of 7601–8998.

==== Temporary Train ====
The "L" trains are temporary—they are not listed in the official train schedule but are added when necessary. Many of these trains only operate at peak passenger travel season, such as during the spring festival travel season. In addition, many new train services are originally added as L-series before train schedules are readjusted and later become regular services. L1–L6998 are used for the temporary trains that run in more than one railway bureau, while L7001–L9998 will be used for the trains that run in only one railway bureau. Recently the type was merged into other types for more kinds of temporary services (e.g Temporary Limited Express).

==== Y ("Linshilüyou", 临时旅游; Temporary Tourist Train) ====
This series is used for trains that specifically run for tourism. Only very few trains begin with Y. Besides, travel agencies can apply to the Railways Department for organizing additional passenger trains for the tours.

==== S ("Shijiao", 市郊; Suburban Commuter Rail) ====
This is a newer class developed to utilize idle tracks (mostly industrial or former industrial) to provide commuter travel to larger city centers from its suburban areas. Existing services until 2015 are S2 line from Yanqing County to Beijing, and Tianjin–Jixian Railway from Ji County to Tianjin. The Jinshan Railway from Jinshan County to Shanghai also fell in this category, but it is fully embedded in Shanghai Metro line; therefore,e tickets are not available on CR's websit,; while the other two offes more conventional service.

=== Former Types ===
Types by 2004:

Type	Designation in Chinese	Route identifiers		Average speed (km/h)
Type	Designation in Chinese	Preceding letter	Number range	Average speed (km/h)
Almost-high-speed train	准高速列车; zhungaosu lieche	Z	1 – 98	120
Rapid express	快速旅客列车; kuaisu lüke lieche	K	1 – 98	N/A
Limited express	特别旅客快车; tebie lüke lieche	N/A	1 – 298	80 – 90
Express	旅客快车; lüke kuaiche	N/A	301 – 698	N/A
Standard [passenger] train	putong lüke lieche	N/A	701 – 898	N/A
Suburban [passenger] train	市郊旅客列车; shijiao lüke lieche	N/A	901 – 948	N/A
Dual-purpose train	hunhe lieche	N/A	951 – 998	N/A
Tourist train	lüyou lieche	Y	1 – 298	N/A

Types during 2004 – 2009:

Hierarchy	Type	Designation in Chinese	Route identifiers		Average speed (km/h)
Hierarchy	Type	Designation in Chinese	Preceding letter	Number range	Average speed (km/h)
Limited express 特快旅客列车; tekuai lüke lieche	Non-stop [limited] express	直达特快; zhida tekuai	Z	1 – 998	119.2
Limited express 特快旅客列车; tekuai lüke lieche	Direct limited express	直通特快; zhitong tekuai	T	1 – 298	92.8
Limited express 特快旅客列车; tekuai lüke lieche	Limited express, within the administration (or corp.)	管内特快; guannei tekuai	T	301 – 998	92.8
Standard express with priority 快速旅客列车; kuaisu lüke lieche	Direct standard express with priority	直通; zhitong	K	1 – 998	66.5
Standard express with priority 快速旅客列车; kuaisu lüke lieche	Standard express with priority, within the administration (or corp.)	guannei	N	1 – 998	66.5
Standard [passenger] train 普通旅客列车; putong lüke lieche	Standard express	普通旅客快车; putong lüke kuaiche	N/A	1001 – 5998	N/A
Standard [passenger] train 普通旅客列车; putong lüke lieche	Standard stopping train	普通旅客慢车; putong lüke manche	N/A	6001 – 8998	N/A
Temporary train		临时旅客列车; linshi lüke lieche	L or A	1 – 998	N/A
Tourist train		旅游列车; lüyou lieche	Y	1 – 998	N/A

Per the Ministry of Railways’ Regulation on the Editing and Management of Train Timetables, the following passenger train classes took effect on 1 April 2009.

Types during 2009 – 2015:

Type	Designation in Chinese	Abbreviation	Route identifiers		Average maximal speed (km/h)
Type	Designation in Chinese	Abbreviation	Preceding letter	Number range	Average maximal speed (km/h)
High-speed EMU train	高速动车组旅客列车; gaosu dongchezu lüke lieche	高; gao	G	1 – 9998	350
EMU train	动车组旅客列车; dongchezu lüke lieche	动; dong	D	1 – 9998	250
Intercity EMU train	城际动车组旅客列车; chengji dongchezu lüke lieche	城; cheng	C	1 – 9998	200
Non-stop express	直达特快旅客列车; zhida tekuai lüke lieche	直; zhi	Z	1 – 9998	160
Limited express	特快旅客列车; tekuai lüke lieche	特; te	T	1 – 9998	140
Standard express with priority	快速旅客列车; kuaisu lüke lieche	快; kuai	K	1 – 9998	120
Standard express	普通旅客快车; putong lüke kuaiche	N/A	N/A	1001 – 5998	below 120
Standard stopping train	普通旅客慢车; putong lüke manche	N/A	N/A	6001 – 7598	below 120
Commuter train	通勤列车; tongqin lieche	N/A	N/A	7601 – 8998	N/A
Temporary train	临时旅客列车; linshi lüke lieche	临; lin	L	1 – 9998	N/A
Tourist train	旅游列车; lüyou lieche	游; you	Y	1 – 998	N/A

Types during 2015 – 2026:

Designation (Translation)	Full designation in Chinese	Abbreviations	Route identifiers		Average maximal speed (km/h)
Designation (Translation)	Full designation in Chinese	Abbreviations	Preceding letter	Number range	Average maximal speed (km/h)
High-speed EMU	高速动车组旅客列车; gāosù dòngchēzǔ lǚkè lièchē	高（速）; Gāo(sù)	G	1 – 9998	350
EMU	动车组旅客列车; dòngchēzǔ lǚkè lièchē	动（车）; Dòng(chē)	D	1 – 9998	250
Intercity EMU	城际动车组旅客列车; chéngjì dòngchēzǔ lǚkè lièchē	城（际）; Chéng(jì)	C	1 – 9999	200
Non-stop Express	直达特快旅客列车; zhídá tèkuài lǚkè lièchē	直（达）; Zhí(dá)	Z	1 – 9998	160
Limited Express	特快旅客列车; tèkuài lǚkè lièchē	特（快）; Tè(kuài)	T	1 – 2998; 5001-9998	140
Temporary Limited Express	临时特快旅客列车; línshí tèkuài lǚkè lièchē	特（快）; Tè(kuài)	T	3001-4998	140
Express	快速旅客列车; kuàisù lǚkè lièchē	快（速）; Kuài(sù)	K	1 – 2999; 5001-9998	120
Temporary Express	临时快速旅客列车; línshí kuàisù lǚkè lièchē	快（速）; Kuài(sù)	K	3001 - 4998	120
Standard Rapid	普通旅客快车; pǔtōng lǚkè kuàichē	普快; Pǔ(Kuài)	N/A	1001 –2998; 5001-5998	below 120
Temporary Standard Rapid	临时普通旅客快车; línshí pǔtōng lǚkè kuàichē	普快; Pǔ(Kuài)	N/A	3001 - 4998	below 120
Standard stopping	普通旅客慢车; pǔtōng lǚkè mànchē	N/A	N/A	6001 – 7598	below 120
Commuter	通勤列车; tōngqín lièchē	N/A	N/A	7601 – 8998	N/A
Tourist	旅游列车; lǚyóu lièchē	（旅）游; (Lǚ)Yóu	Y	1 – 998	N/A

== Accommodation and fares ==
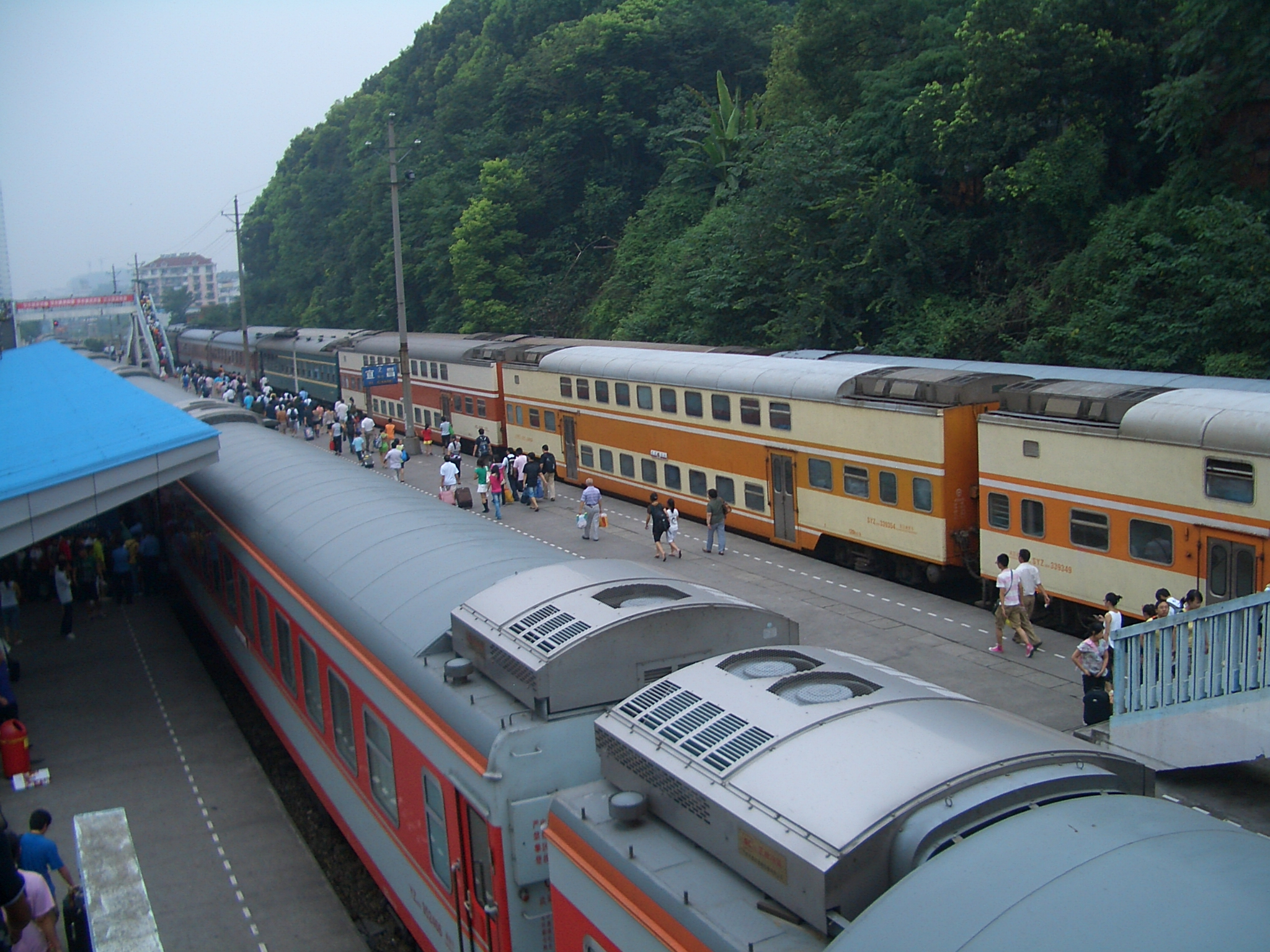
Trains at Yichang station. The orange two-level cars are hard-seat cars of a day train from Hankou

=== CRH train ===
- Business Class Seat (商务座; shāngwù zuò), on a few services pending on train type, such as the CRH380AL or CRH380BL trains. 3 seats per row (2+1). Lie-flat seats with airline-style catering provided. The newer Fuxing trains, such as the Fuxing CR400AF and the CR400BF trains, the CR400BF-Z has a newly updated interior, with new privacy centered business class seats, with a sliding door, and a 1+1 layout. The CR400AF-Z has a similarly updated Business Class seat, but without a sliding door. These are also in the updated 1+1 layout.
- Premier Class Seat (特等座; tèděng zuò), can vary, depending on train type, from being similar to Business Class-style seats or First Class seats located in premier or sightseeing positions such as behind the drivers cab. 3 seats per row (2+1) or compartment seats. Unlike Business Class seats, these seats are not lie-flat seats but can, in general recline. They are rare, with most trains having Business Class Steats.
- First Class Seat (一等座; Yīděngzuò), used for CRH series EMU trains. There are 4 seats per row (2+2), just similar as soft seats. They offer more legroom and space than the second class seats.
- Second Class Seat (二等座; èrděngzuò), used for CRH series EMU trains. Similar as hard seat, there are 5 seats per row (3+2), the sitting area is relatively small.
- Soft sleeper, used for CRH series EMU trains. Found on only a few 'D' trains running overnight between Shanghai-ing or Beijing-Shenzhen. Similar as a soft sleeper on conventional trains but are limited to 4 berths to aperpartment. Some upper berths can fold away to permit running purely as seated passengers.
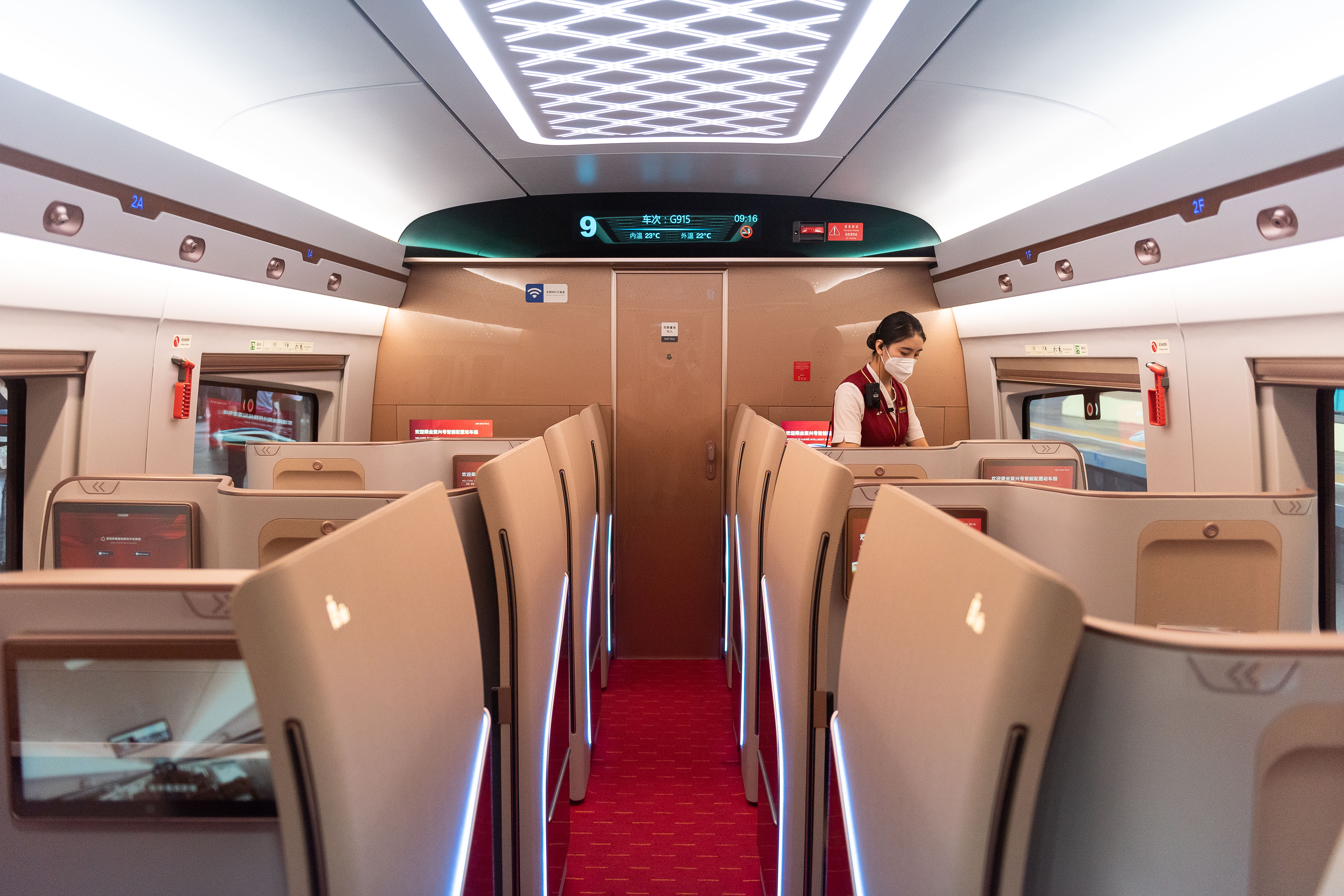
Business class
(CR400BF-Z series)

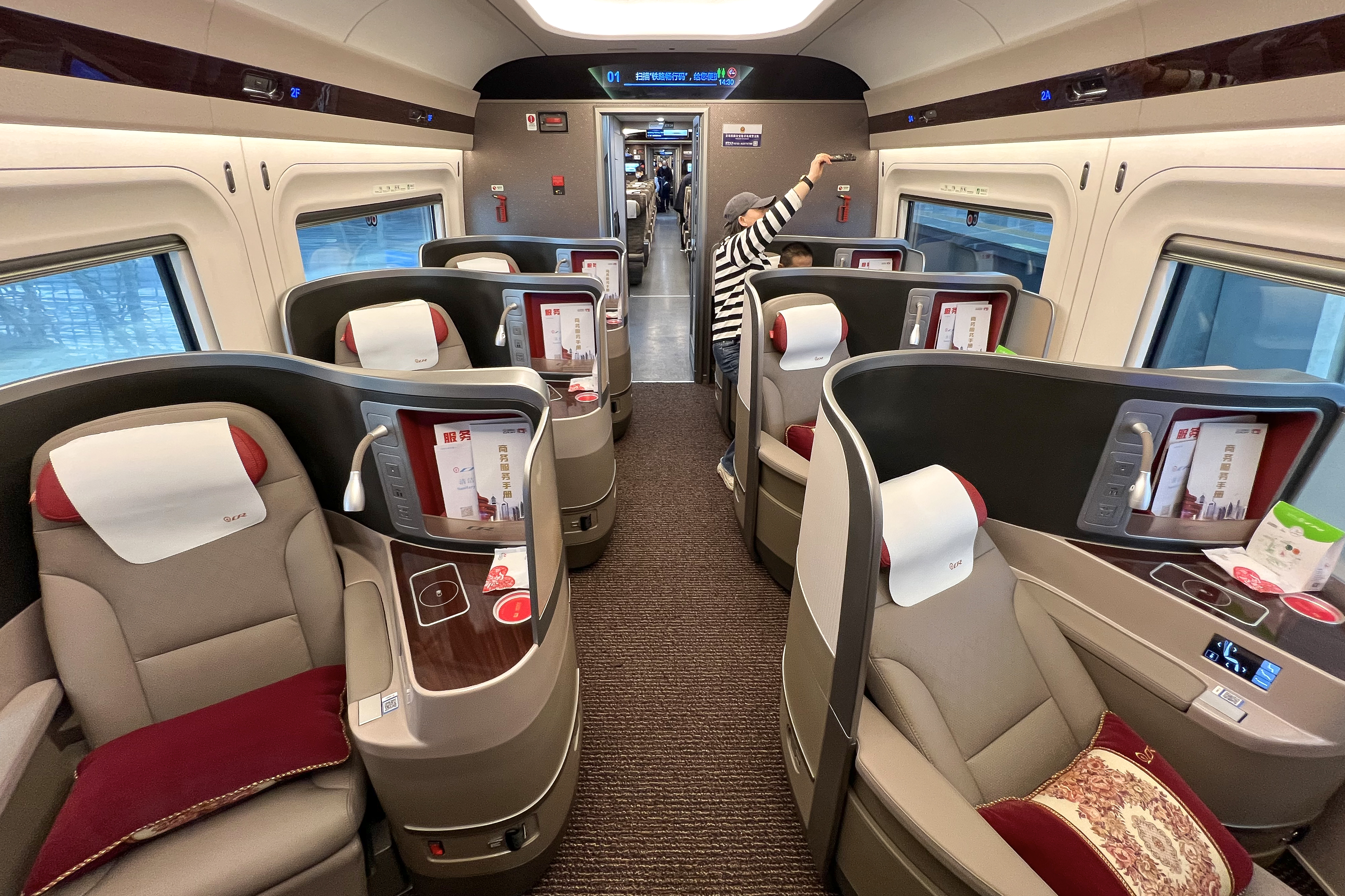
Business class
(CR400AF-Z series)

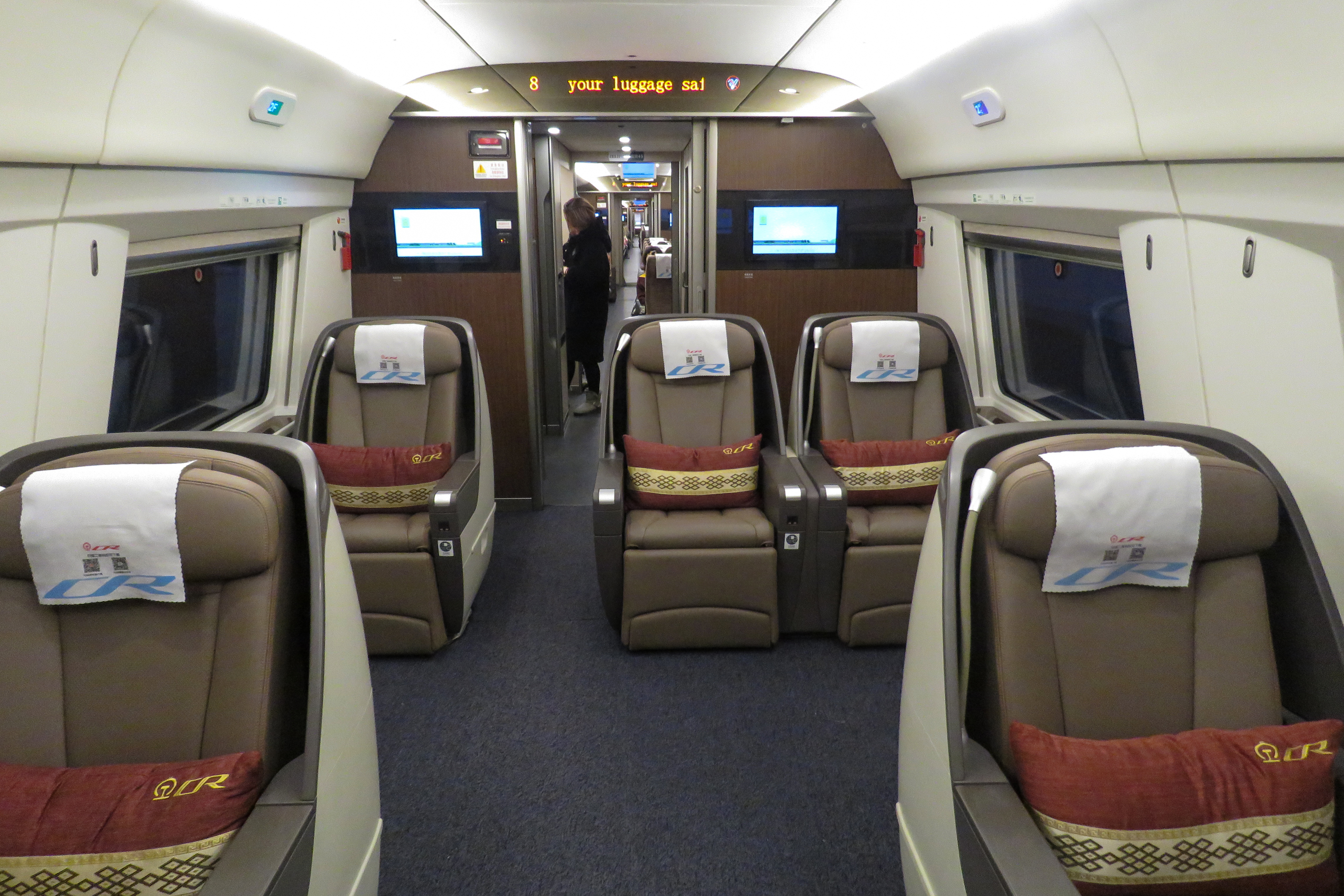
Business class
(CR400AF)

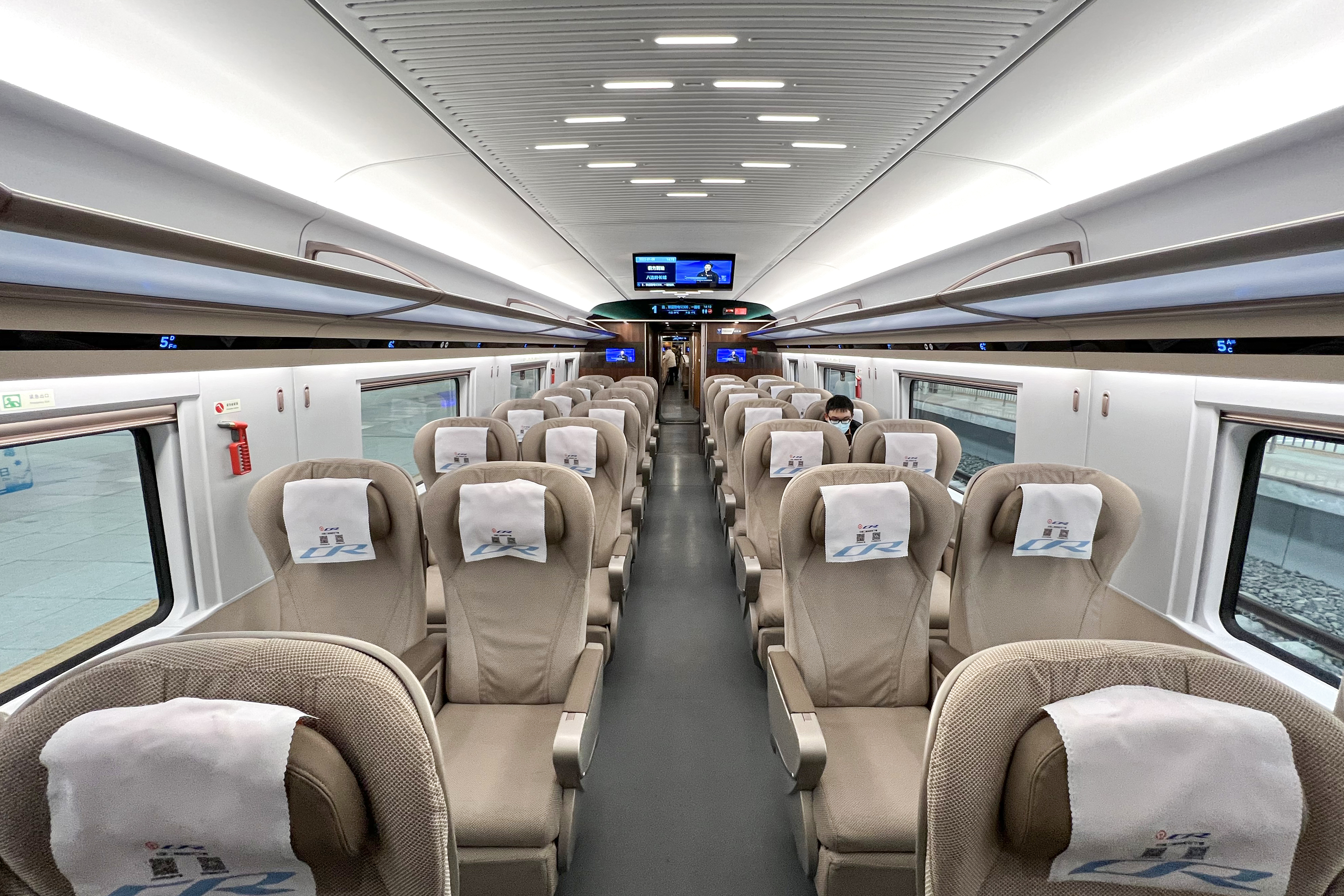
First class
(CR400BF-C)

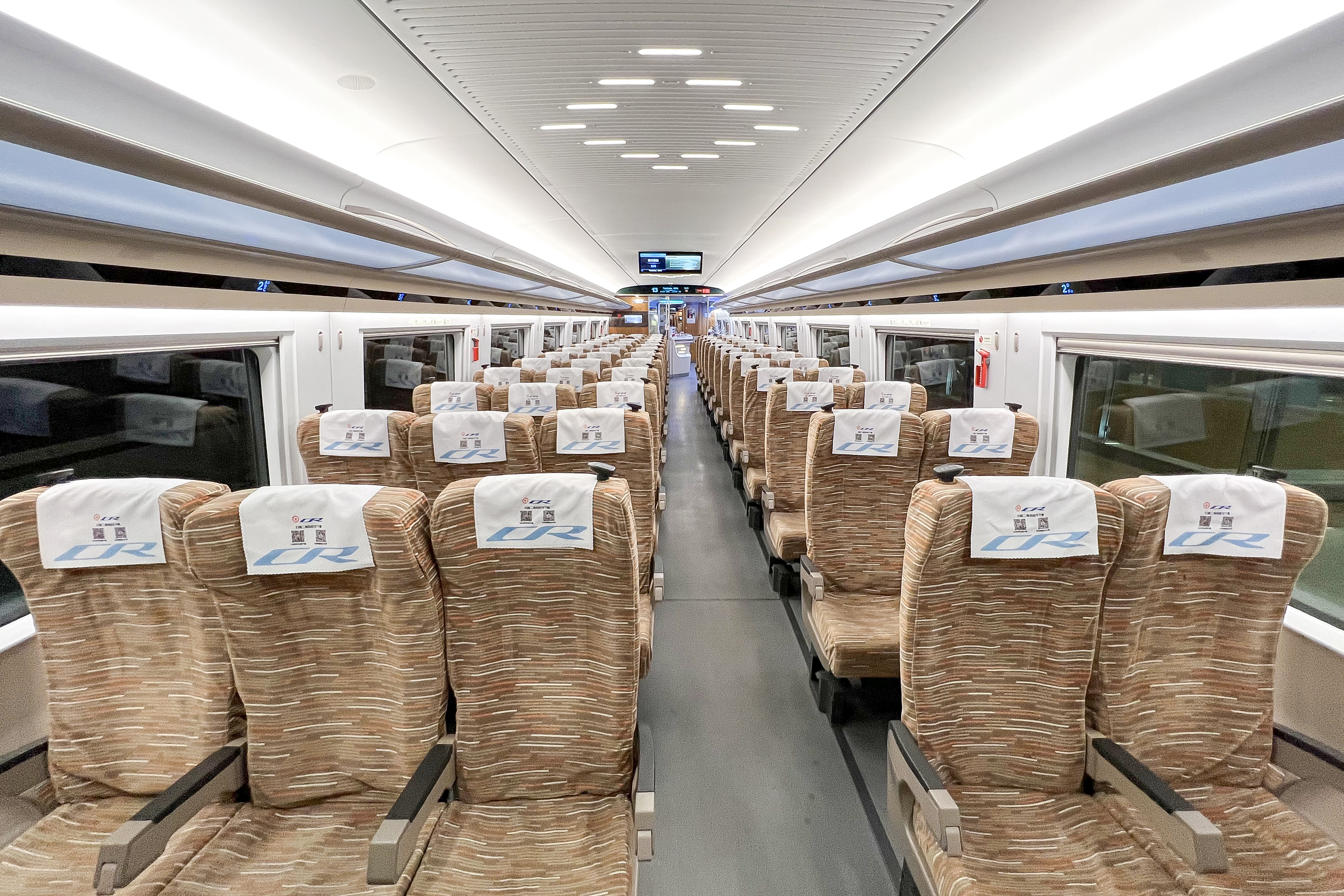
Second class
(CR400BF-Z series)

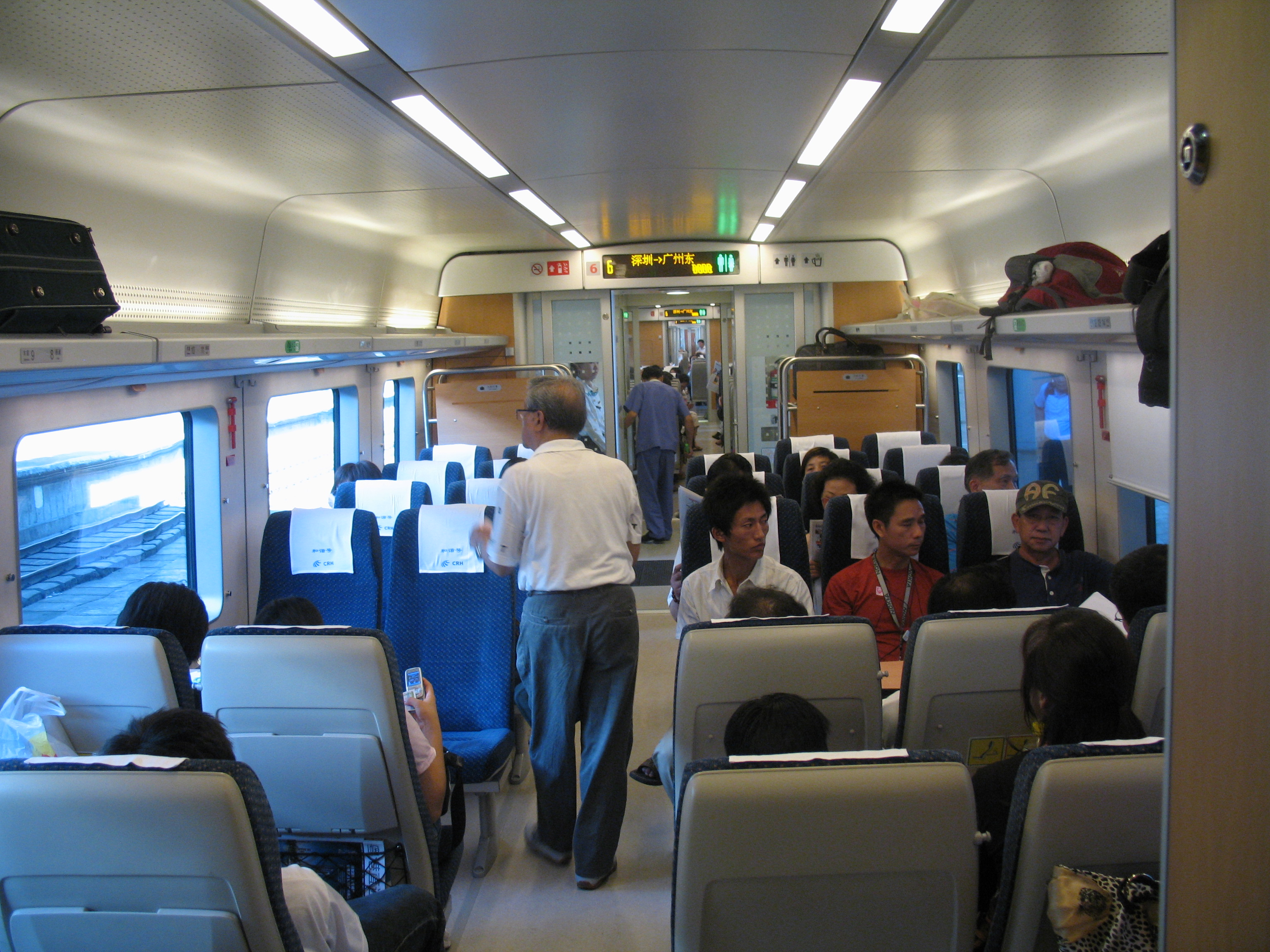
Second Class Seat
(CRH1A EMU)

=== Classic Rail train ===
- Hard seat (硬座; Yìngzuò) is the basic fare, somewhat similar to the economy class on an airplane. On busier routes, passengers who cannot arrange for better seats because of overcrowding must also purchase this type of ticket. In some cases, tickets are sold with no seat assigned (无座; wú zuò), which allows the railway to sell more tickets than there are seats in the car. Still, even the number of "no seat" tickets offered for sale is limited, to keep overcrowding within limits.
- Soft seat (软座; Ruǎnzuò) is one level above the Hard Seat. There are 4 seats per row (2+2), so it has comfortable seating similar to business class on airplanes.
- Hard sleeper (硬卧; Yìngwò) is the basic accommodation for an overnight train. Despite the name, the bunks comfortably accommodate anyone below six feet. Bunks are arranged three on a side in a compartment—indicated by top, middle and bottom on the ticket. There are no doors for the compartments.
- Soft sleeper (软卧; Ruǎnwò) contains a wider bunk bed in an enclosed cabin, two bunks to a side. There is more room for luggage storage than in hard sleeper. Occasionally there may be an entertainment system where movie channels are available for viewing through headphones and an LCD for each bunk.
- Luxury sleeper (高级软卧包厢; Gāojí Ruǎnwò or 高包; Gāobāo) is the top level sleeper that is only provided by a few trains. The ticket is also much more expensive than that of soft sleeper. It only contains two beds in a cabin, and there is an independent toilet in every cabin. Some of them have a shower cubicle in the car.

Common to CRH and Classic Rail trains are standing tickets which do not include a seat and require the traveler to stand for the duration of the trip. This can lead to extreme overcrowding during busy travel seasons. Ticket holders are assigned to a carriage, typically only the hard seat or second-class seat carriage, and are not permitted to enter the soft seat or sleeper carriages. On high-speed trains, fewer standing tickets are available and they are limited to entry vestibules and café cars. Small folding seats are often sold in rail stations and from onboard vendors for standing ticket holders to sit in aisles.

Train fares may vary depending on the availability of air-conditioning.

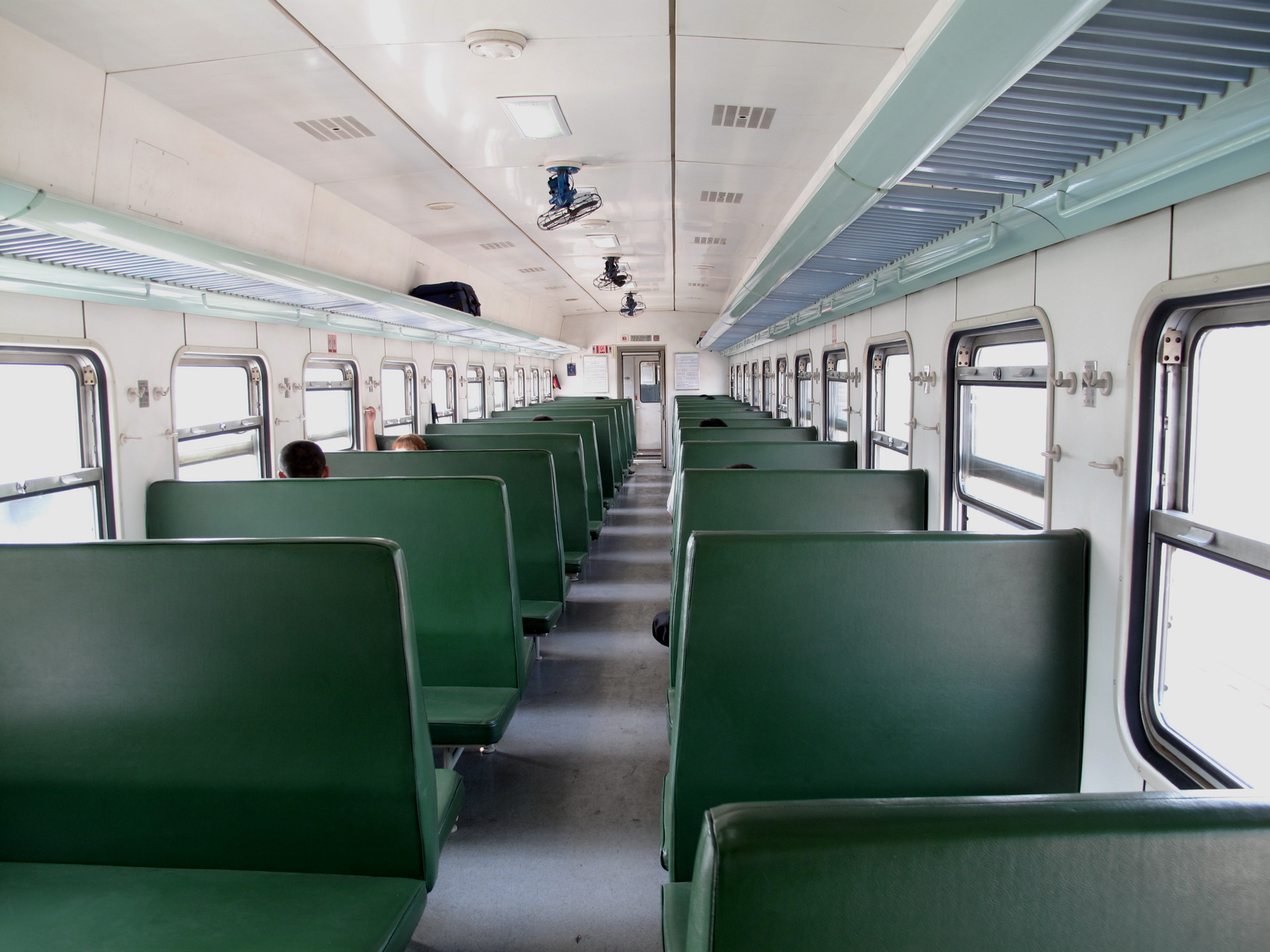
Hard seat (non air-conditioned)

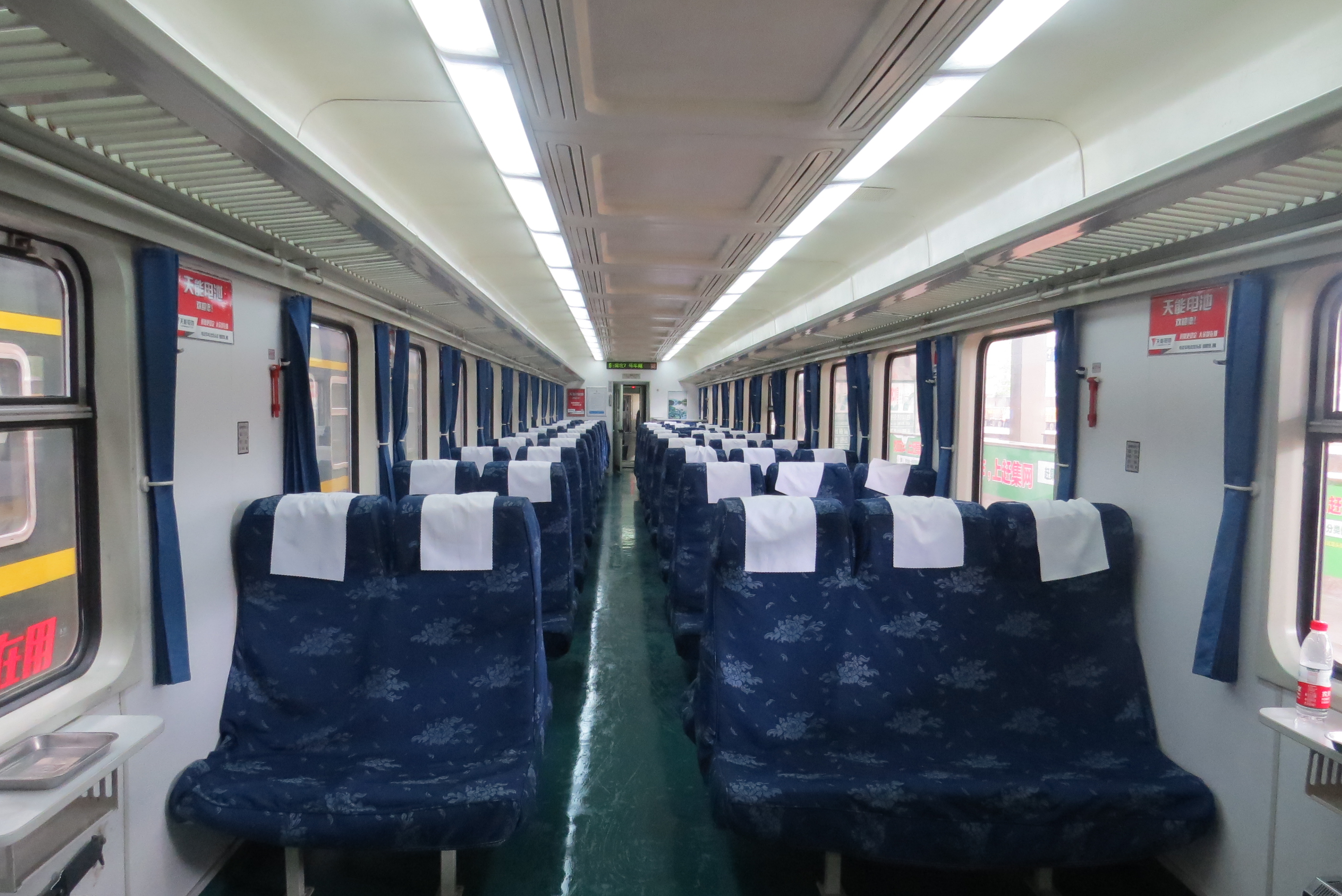
Hard seat (air-conditioned)

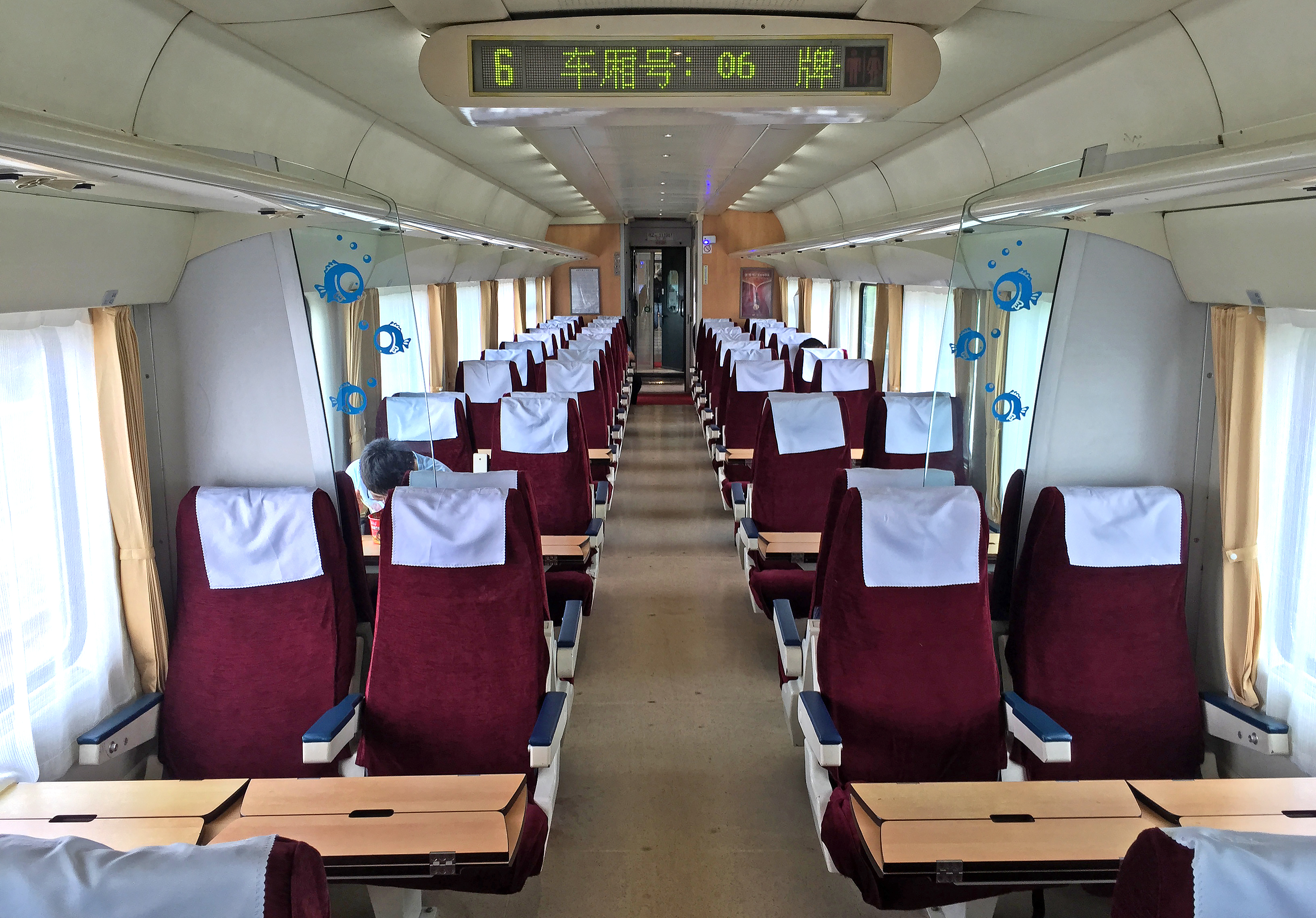
Soft seat

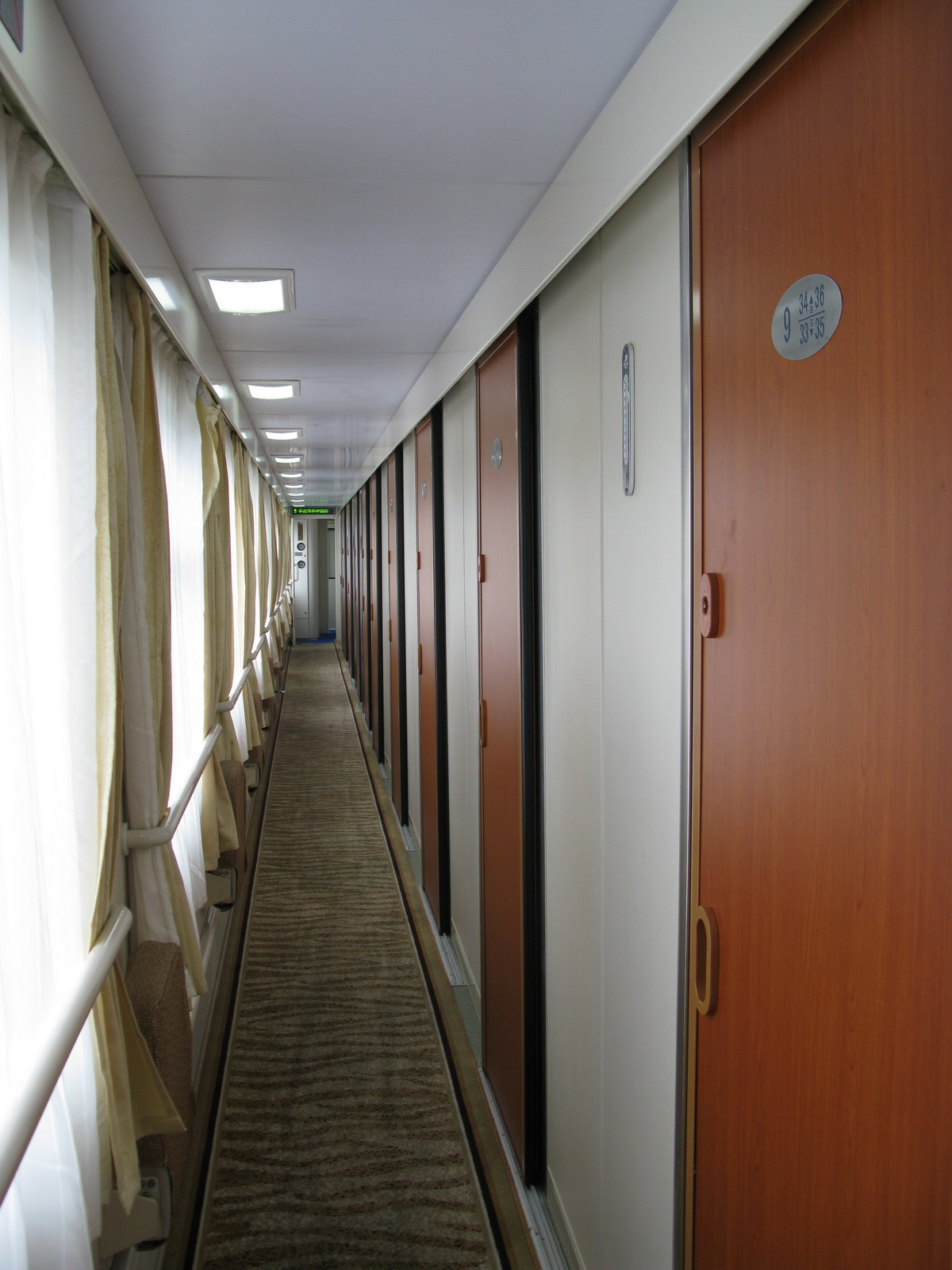
Soft sleeper

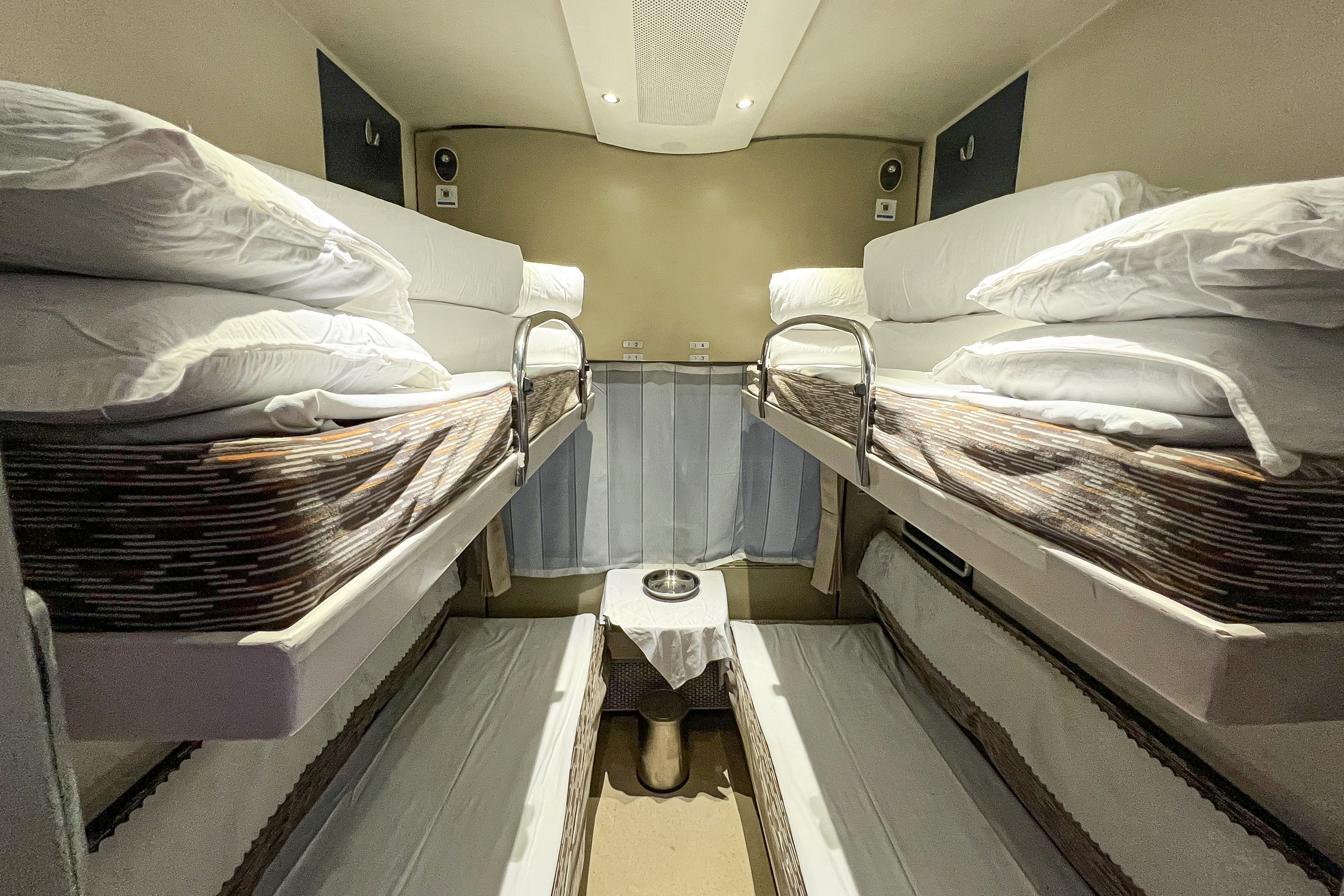
Soft sleeper compartment

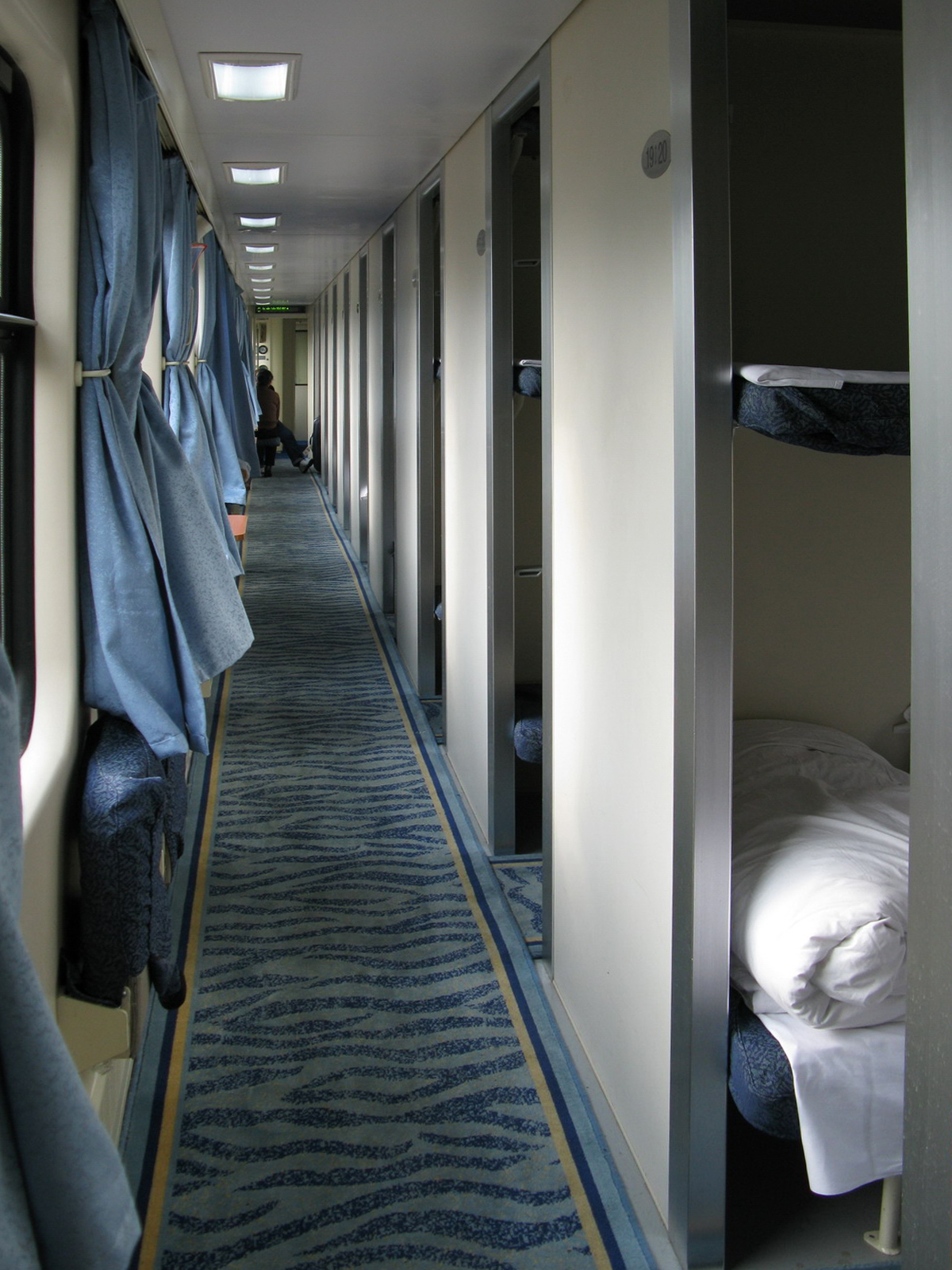
Hard sleeper (semi-compartment)

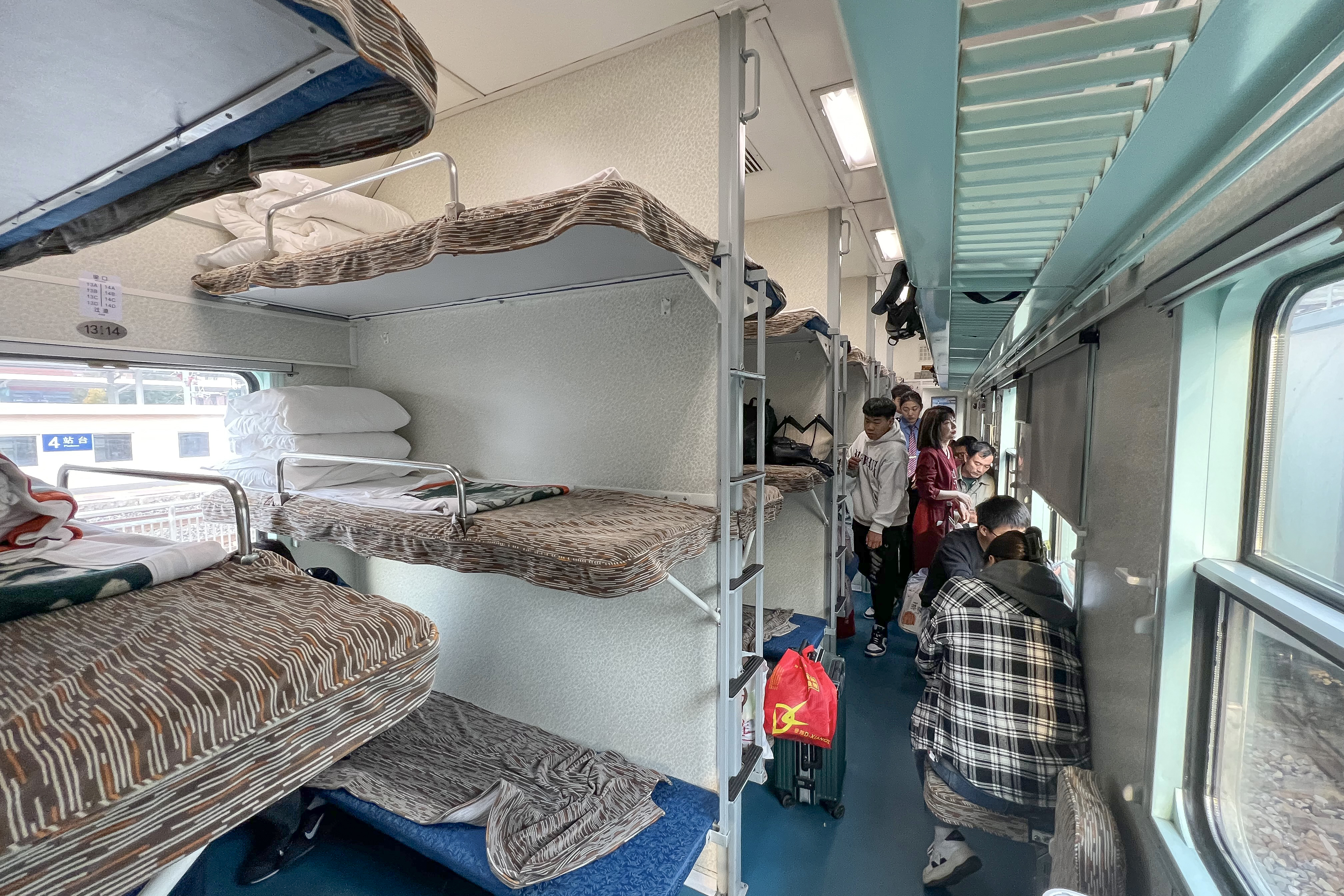
Hard sleeper (open)

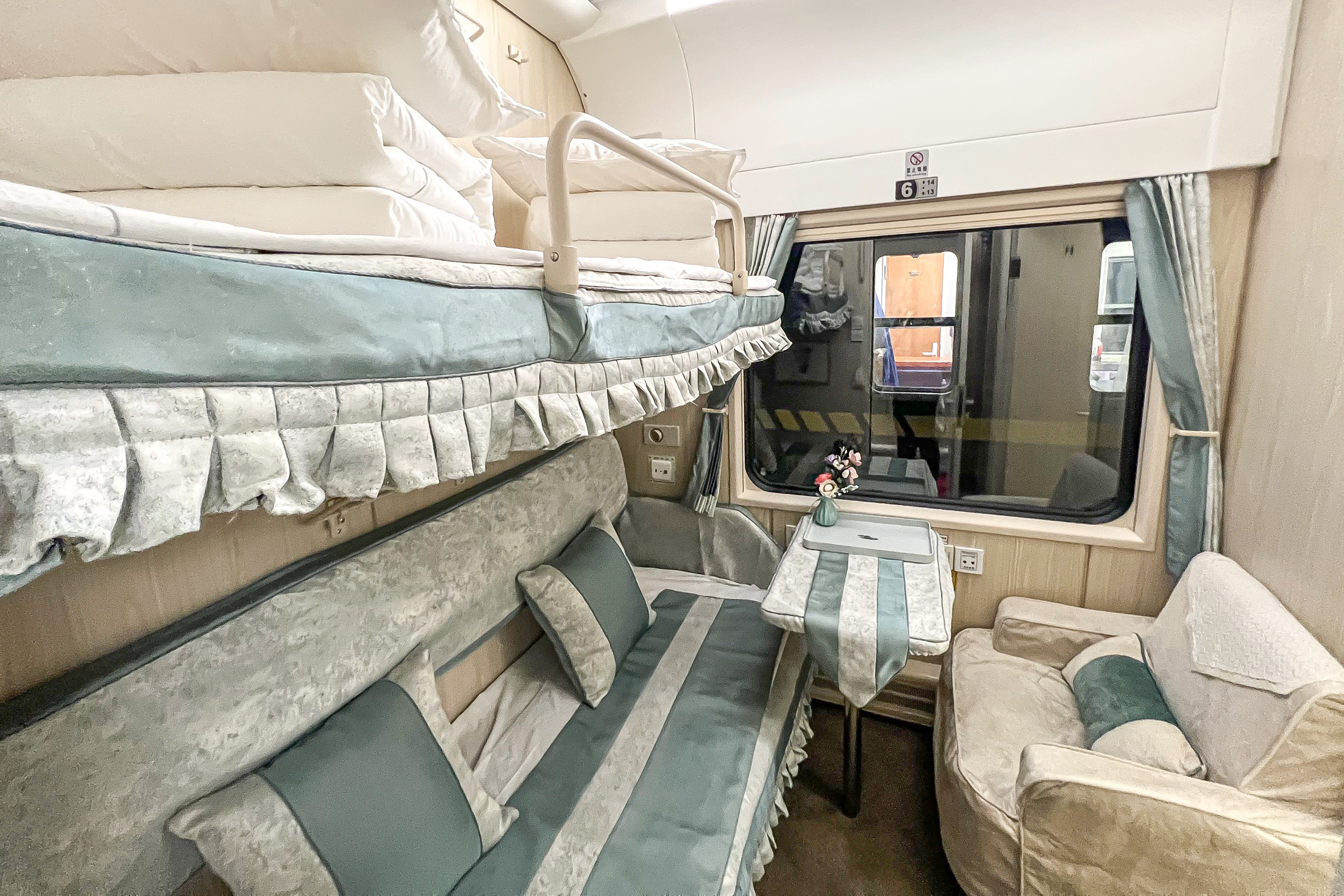
Deluxe sleeper

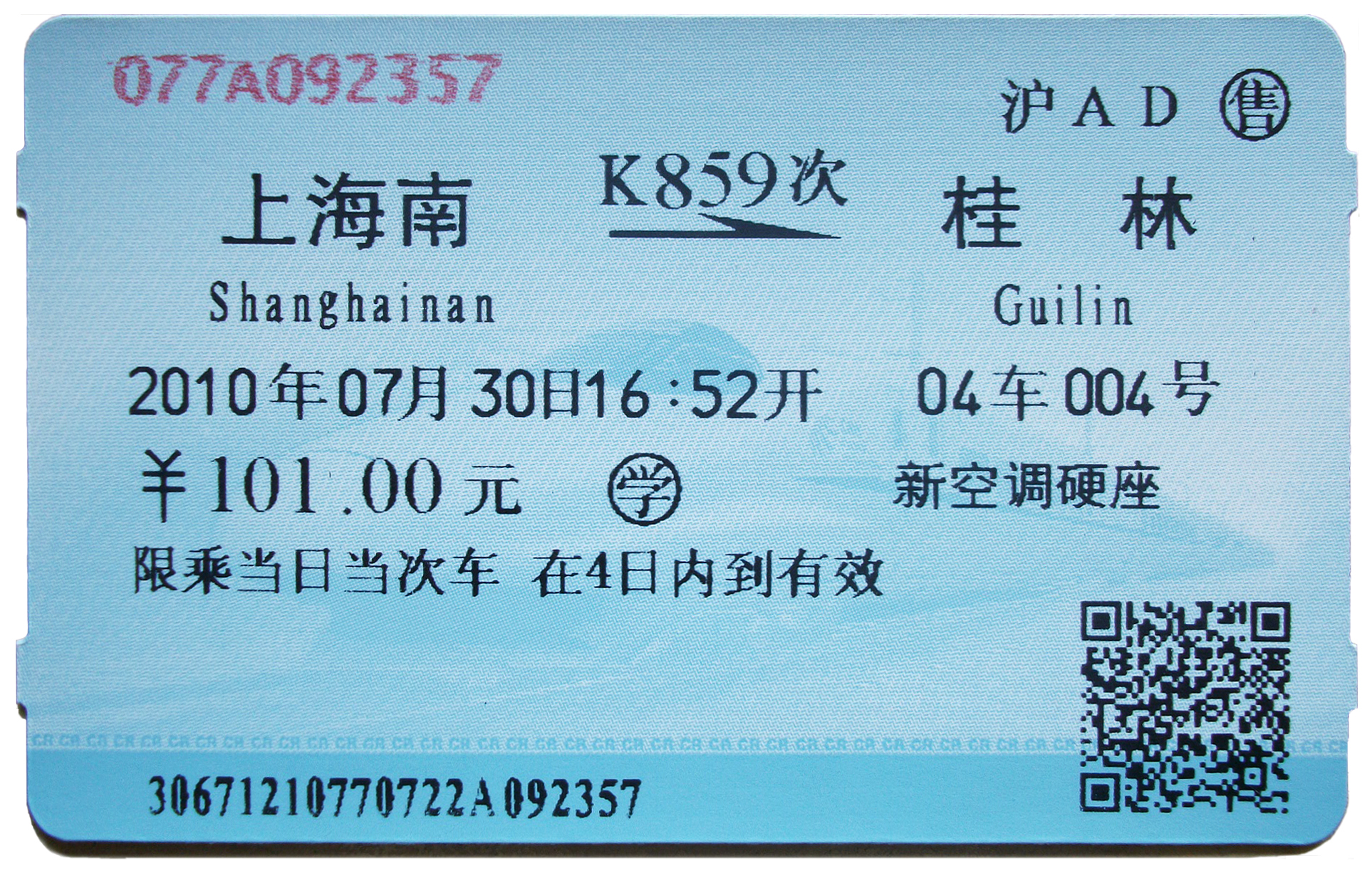
Blue Style Railway Ticket

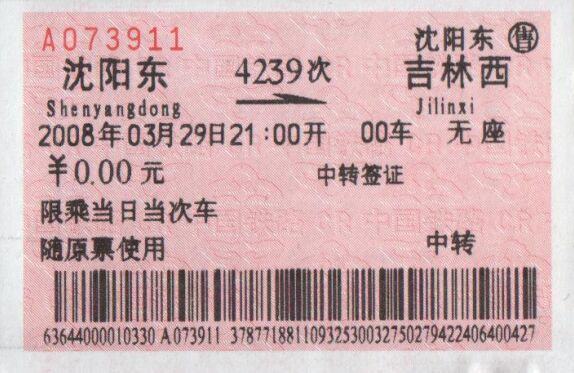
Pink Style Railway Ticket

The majority of train tickets in China are thermally printed paper tickets displaying the train's origin and destination, service number, price, date and travel time, accommodation type, class and seat number, as well as a barcode for security checks. Some tickets on the CRH routes, such as Nanjing–Shanghai–Hangzhou or Guangzhou–Shenzhen, use machine-readable tickets; i.e., tickets on the Nanjing–Shanghai route have a magnetically encoded stripe for future use of automatic ticket inspection gates being implemented at major stations along the route, while tickets on the Guangzhou–Shenzhen line have embedded RFID microchips which can be read by proximity readers mounted above the ticket gates.

Most trains feature some kind of on-board catering service. Vendors with trolleys walk through the train selling snacks, drinks, fruit, newspapers, etc. On shorter distance trains and many high-speed trains, there is a cafe car selling light snacks, tea, coffee, beer, etc., whilst conventional long-haul trains have full-service restaurant cars. At many stations along the route, vendors will sell fruit, prepared food and instant noodles on the platforms during the stops for Classic Rail trains. Hot-water is provided in almost every carriage for passengers to make tea or instant noodles.

Smoking is generally not permitted in the accommodation or washroom areas of the trains but is allowed in the restaurant/cafe area and in the vestibules between the cars. On modern trains such as CRH or Beijing Suburban Railway, smoking is completely banned, with some smoke detectors connected to the brakes to stop the train, causing errant smokers facing hefty fines and penalties. On the Guangzhou–Kowloon cross-border train smoking is only permitted in the cafe car.

== E-tickets and Internet ticket purchase ==
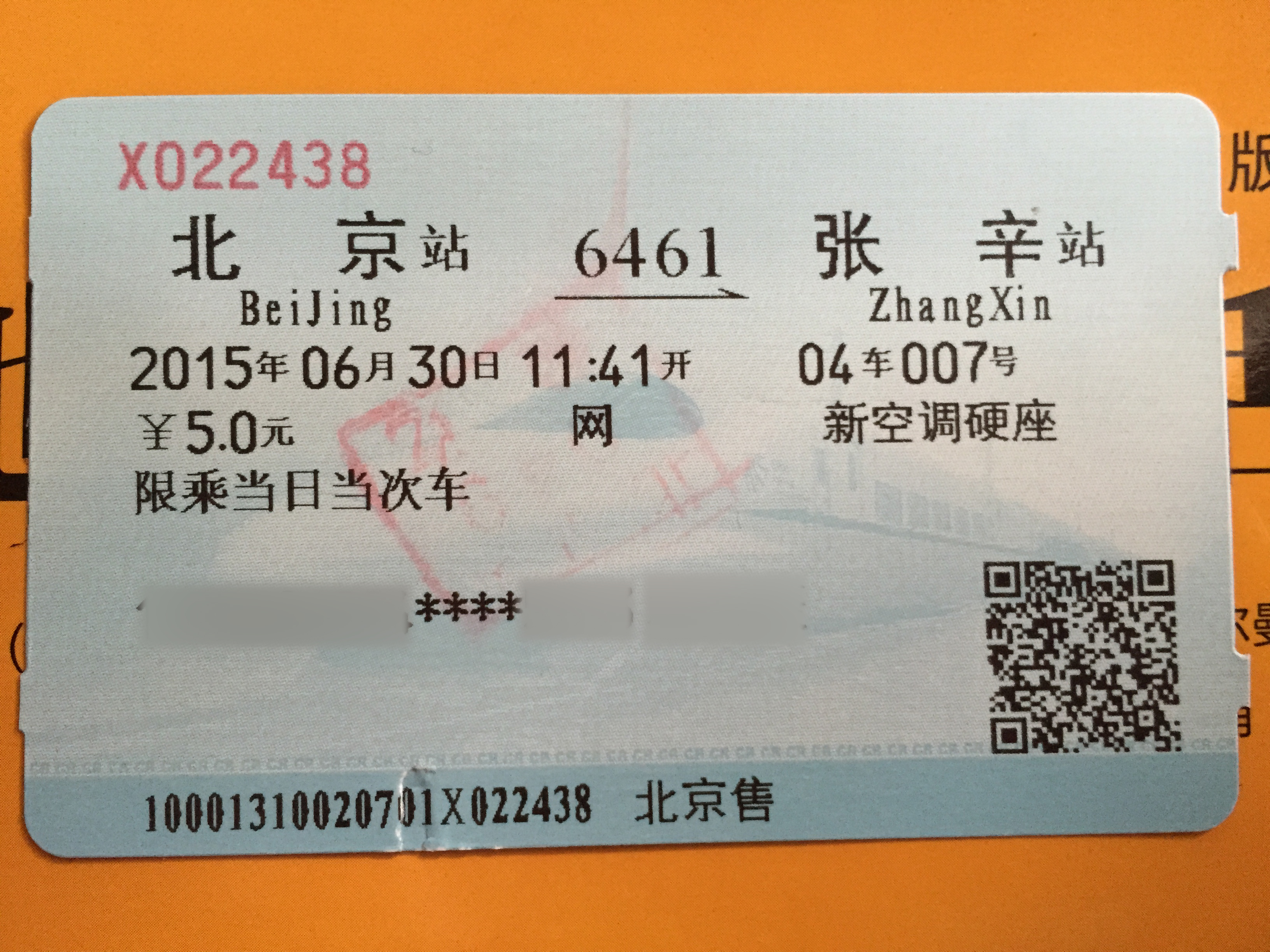
A ticket of train 6461 in new layout, which was bought from the official ticketing website

Since July 12, 2011, the e-ticket system has been first adopted on the Beijing–Tianjin intercity railway. Since December 23, 2011, all tickets can be bought at the official ticket website (12306.cn).

Debit card and credit cards with the China UnionPay icon, Alipay, and WeChat Pay aree accepted on 12306.cn.

Identification of one of the following types is required:

- Chinese Resident Identity Card (2nd generation)
- Home Return Permit Hong Kong & Macau Resident to Mainland Permit or Mainland Resident to Hong Kong & Macau Permit
- Taiwan Resident to Mainland Permit or Mainland Resident to Taiwan Permit
- Chinese Foreign Permanent Resident ID Card
- Valid passport

=== Check-in ===
==== E-tickets ====
Since 2020, all China Railway tickets are electronic, and are sold either online at 12306.cn (or the Railway 12306 app) or offline at ticket machines or ticket counters using the internal Ticketing and Reservation System (TRS). Only the original ID document (or a temporary ID document issued by police) is valid for travel. A dynamic e-ticket QR code app in the Railway 12306 mobile app may also be used in conjunction with the ID document. Tickets are not transferrable.

Chinese Resident Identity cards are tapped on faregates before boarding and before exiting the station upon arrival. Some faregates may have an optical scanner for passports and a QR code scanner for the QR code in the Railway 12306 app. All identity documents can be used at the staffed gate located at one end of the gateline.

==== Changes and refunds ====
Changes to online bookings can be made any time before departure and on the same day after departure. A ticket can only be changed once. Refunds are generally only possible before the departure of the train.

== Frequent Traveler Program ==
Effective December 20, 2017, China's railway authorities introduced the "Railway Rewards" frequent traveler program. Passengers aged 12 and above may apply for membership upon completing identity verification. Members earn points for real-name, standard tickets at a rate of five points per yuan of the ticket's face value. Points become eligible for redemption once an account accumulates a minimum of 10,000 points.

When redeeming points for designated train services, every 100 points are valued at 1 RMB. The program does not allow for mixed payments between points and cash. Tickets obtained through point redemption are non-refundable, and the arrival station cannot be changed. Passengers are permitted to change their booking to other eligible trains; however, while any price deficit must be covered, no refunds are provided for price surpluses. A handling fee of 1,000 points is applied to each ticket change.

== Cross-border trains ==
=== To Hong Kong (Kowloon) (Terminated) ===
Before 30 Jan 2020, intercity through train services are available between Kowloon (Hung Hom station) and Beijing West, Shanghai, and Guangzhou East. Passengers have to pass departure immigration at departure station and arrival immigration at arrival station, and boarding and alighting at intermediate stations are not allowed for cross-border passengers.

For Beijing/Shanghai to Kowloon routes, additional carriages are attached in the section between Beijing/Shanghai and Guangzhou East for domestic passengers, where boarding and alighting is allowed at intermediate stations. Tickets cannot be booked through the CR website.

The intercity through train services was suspended since 30 Jan 2020 due to the COVID19 pandemic. The Guangzhou-Kowloon route has replaced by G-series trains between Guangzhou East and West Kowloon, while the Beijing/Shanghai to Kowloon routes are officially replaced by the EMU sleeper trains which, which have been operating from Hong Kong West Kowloon Station since 15 Jun 2024.

=== To Hong Kong (West Kowloon via Guangshengang XRL) ===
High-speed services have been available since 2018 between West Kowloon and Shenzhen, Guangzhou and other cities in mainland China like Shanghai, Xiamen, Guiyang and Beijing. Passengers have to pass immigrations in the West Kowloon station, and those trains also serve as normal high-speed trains in mainland China. Sections operated by CR (from other stations in mainland China to Shenzhen Futian) and MTR (West Kowloon to Shenzhen Futian) have different pricing policies, making the cross-border section one of the most expensive in China. Tickets can be booked through the Internet.

=== International passenger trains ===
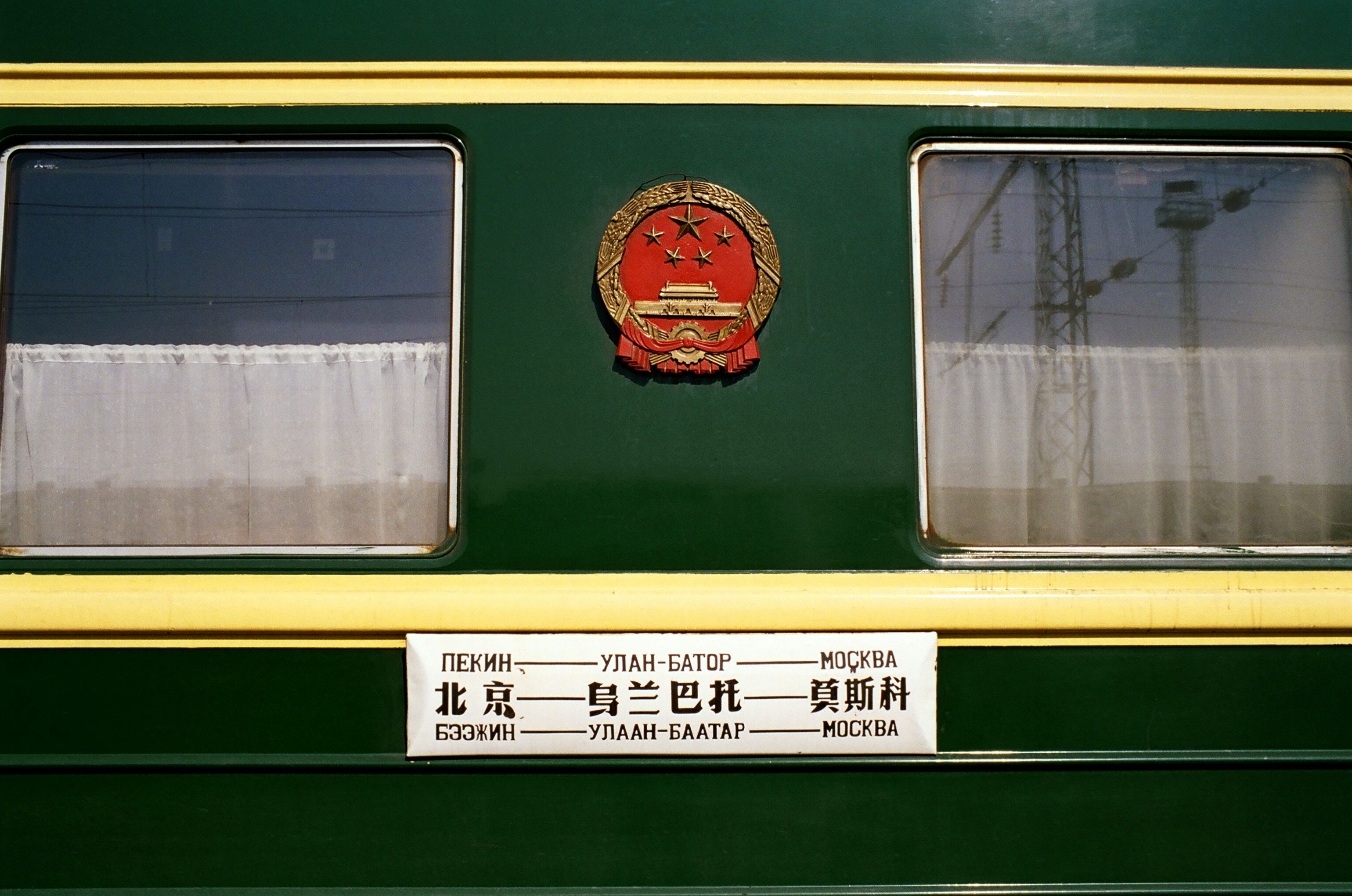
Beijing–UlaanBaatar–Moscow International train

A few trains can transport passengers out of China to places such as Ulaanbaatar in Mongolia, Moscow in Russia, Almaty in Kazakhstan, P'yŏngyang in North Korea, Hanoi in Vietnam, Vientiane in Laos and so on. Tickets can only be bought through travel agents near the departure station. While other International passenger trains are all numbers, K or Z-type conventional trains, the train between Kunming South Railway Station and Vientiane Railway Station is the only International passenger train as a D-type multiple-unit train.

== See also ==
- Coach yard
- List of tram and light rail transit systems
- List of town tramway systems in Asia
- List of rapid transit systems
- List of trolleybus systems
- Urban rail transit in China
