= Hard sleeper =

Railway compartment class in China

The hard sleeper (Chinese: 硬卧; pinyin: yìng wò, abbreviated YW) is a passenger railway compartment class in the People's Republic of China. Hard sleeper is a class on most Z-series, T-series express trains and K-series rapid trains. It is usually the cheapest type of sleeper on Chinese trains.

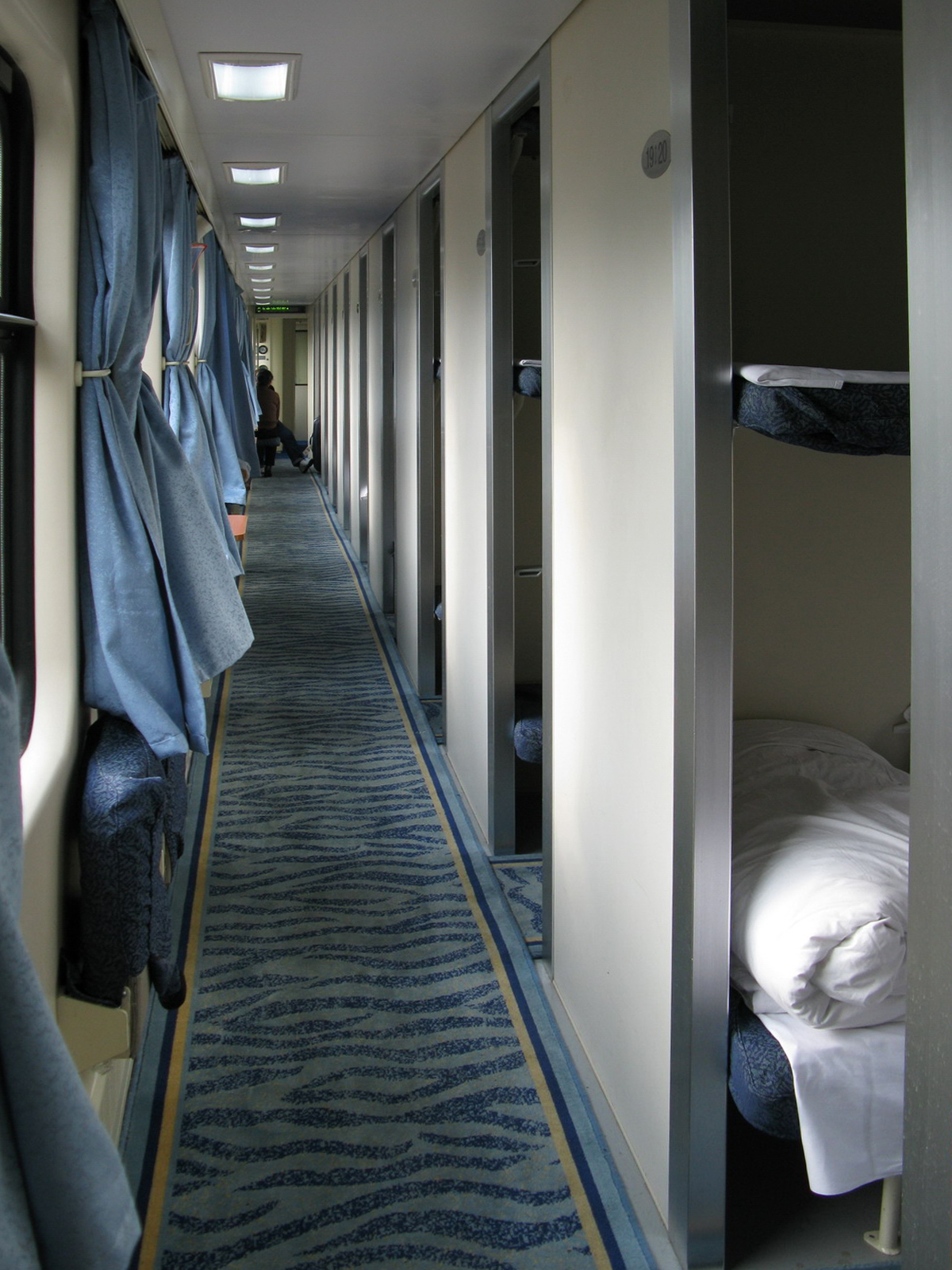
A type YW25T hard sleeper carriage

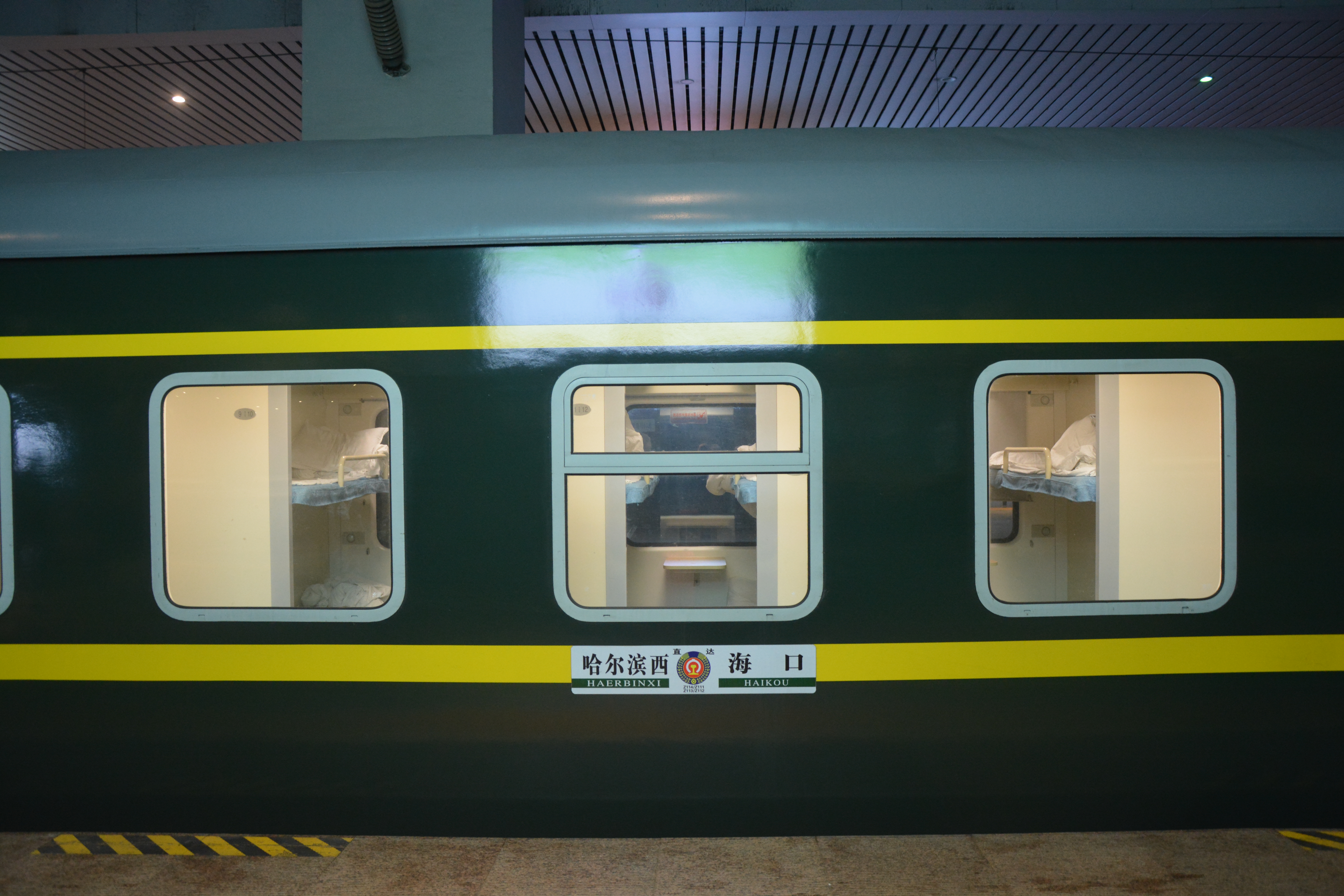
A sleeping car of Z112 Haikou-Harbin train in June 2019. The whole journey takes about 48 hours.

Hard sleeper has long been popular with passengers travelling long distances at relatively low cost, especially before the large-scale expansion of high-speed rail in China and the wider availability of domestic air travel. Compared with hard-seat travel, it allows passengers to sleep rather than remain seated for the journey, while remaining cheaper than soft sleeper accommodation. As a result, tickets may be scarce on busy routes and during peak travel periods, and advance booking is often advisable.

The differences between hard and soft sleeper compartments are as follows:

- 6 bunks instead of 4, with three bunks on each side
- Usually no door, although the degree of enclosure varies by carriage type
- No blind on the window, although curtains may be provided
- Less comfortable bedding, such as only one pillow
- No individual TV screen

A typical hard-sleeper carriage has eleven semi-open six-berth sections, giving a capacity of 66 passengers. The bunks have a length of 180 cm (71 inches) and a width of 60 cm (24 inches). The head space for passengers on the upper and middle bunks is limited, with the middle bunk having 70 cm (28 inches) and the upper bunk having 65 cm (26 inches) of head space.

Despite its name, the bunks are padded, but less generously than soft-sleeper bunks. Like soft sleepers, hard-sleeper carriages usually have a small table, hot water and a rubbish bin. The lower bunk (下) is the roomiest, followed by the middle bunk (中). The upper bunk (上) has the least room and requires passengers to climb up to it, so it is usually slightly cheaper than the lower and middle bunks.

In addition, the carriage usually has a Chinese-style toilet at each end, whereas soft-sleeper carriages may have a Western-style toilet at one end.

== Rolling stock and variation ==
Hard-sleeper facilities vary considerably by train service and by the age, design and refurbishment history of the rolling stock. Because Chinese hard-sleeper carriages have been manufactured and rebuilt over several decades, including examples built before the turn of the 21st century, interiors may range from relatively modern and semi-enclosed to more basic open-plan layouts. Cleanliness, lighting, luggage space, toilet condition, power outlets and other fittings are therefore not uniform across all services.

Newer or refurbished trains may have power sockets for laptops and mobile phones, but older carriages may have few outlets, or not enough for the number of passengers in the carriage. Passengers who need to charge devices may ask the carriage attendant whether an outlet in or near the attendant's room can be used, although this is subject to staff discretion and operating rules.

Some newer hard-sleeper cars, including many YW25T cars, use a semi-enclosed layout similar in general form to a soft-sleeper compartment, but without a door. This design gives passengers more privacy from the corridor while retaining the six-berth hard-sleeper arrangement. Older hard-sleeper cars more often use a more open layout, with bunks opening directly toward the aisle and ladders commonly shared between neighbouring bunks. Some passengers prefer the additional privacy of the semi-enclosed design, while others prefer the openness and visibility of the older arrangement.

Shortly after the trip starts, the carriage attendant will come around and exchange tickets for berth tokens. Tickets will be returned before arrival at the destination.
