= Soft sleeper =

Type of sleeping car in China

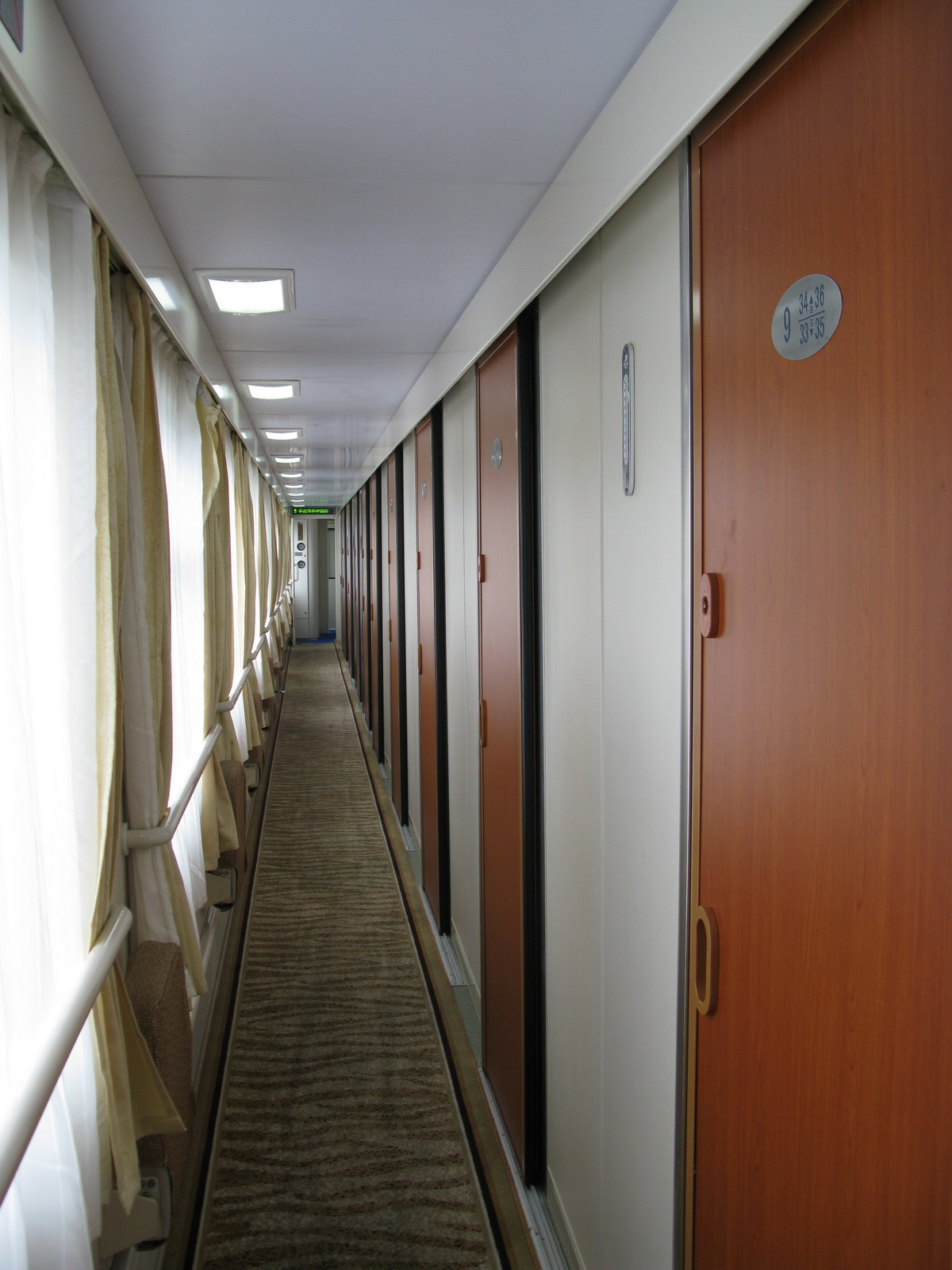
The corridor of a soft-sleeper rail car

The soft sleeper (Chinese: 软卧; pinyin: ruǎn wò), abbreviated RW or WR (CRH), is a passenger railway compartment class in the People's Republic of China. Soft sleeper is the main class on most Z-series express trains, and soft-sleeper cars are also included in the formations of slower trains. They are more expensive than hard sleepers but are generally more comfortable, as there is more room to move around and the bunks tend to be, though not always, softer in firmness. In many soft-sleeper compartments, entertainment is available through headphones connected to an LCD screen, although this is by no means universal.

Soft sleepers usually have four bunks, sometimes six. In conventional four-berth soft-sleeper cars, most carriages have eight or nine compartments, giving a designated full occupancy of 32 or 36 passengers; this capacity, together with the RW carriage designation, is usually shown on markings at the ends of the carriage. The bunks come with a lower sheet, two pillows and a covered duvet. The compartment has a door that is lockable, although the carriage attendant has a key to open it. A large thermos of hot water, slippers and a rubbish bin are provided.

Tickets are priced slightly cheaper for the upper berths than the more desired lower berths. Due to the compartmental nature of the soft sleeper, it is sometimes appropriate for passengers to reserve tickets in batches of four to share a single compartment, though this may not always work, especially on certain routes during peak season.

Because soft-sleeper tickets are generally sold by individual berth rather than by gender-separated compartment, the standard booking process does not necessarily guarantee single-gender compartments. A solo passenger may therefore share a four-berth compartment with passengers of another gender, including being the only passenger of their gender in the compartment.

== Rolling stock and variation ==
Soft-sleeper facilities vary by train service and by the age, maintenance and refurbishment history of the rolling stock. Since Chinese railways have produced and rebuilt soft-sleeper carriages over several decades, features such as power outlets, entertainment screens, bedding condition, interior finish and cleanliness are not uniform across all services.

On many conventional services, Z-series trains commonly use RW25T soft-sleeper cars, T-series trains often use RW25K cars, and K-series trains often use RW25G cars, although substitutions and mixed formations may occur.

Two higher travel classes are based on soft sleepers, including luxury sleeper (Chinese: 高级软卧) with two bunks per compartment and single-berth compartment (Chinese: 一人软包) with only one bed per compartment.
