= Second-class seat =

Chinese railway seating class

A second-class seat (Chinese: 二等座; pinyin: èrděngzuò) is a class of passenger service fare used for CRH high-speed rail series EMU trains. Similar as hard-seat travel on Chinese conventional speed trains. The arrangement is for five seats per row (3+2), the sitting area is relatively small but padded. Luggage space is limited on all CRH services with a luggage rack provided above the seating, however the staff are strict on all overhanging baggage and straps. Oversized bags may be stored between the last seat and the carriage wall but it is still limited in size and varies according to vehicle type.
