= Z-series trains =

Overnight express trains in China

Z-series trains (Chinese: 直达特快列车) are a sleeper train service offered by China Railway. Z stands for Zhida Tekuai (lit. 'Direct Express'). Most Z-series trains used to not have any intermediary stops, not even technical stops for changing locomotives or drivers. However, most of these trains later had a few stops added to their schedule to boost the number of passengers.

Generally, Z-series trains are overnight, all-sleeper trains that have travel time of around 10–14 hours, with an average speed of around 120 kilometres per hour (75 mph), and top speed up to 162 kilometres per hour (101 mph). The majority have both soft sleepers and hard sleepers, while some Z trains have only soft sleepers, few of them also have soft seat. Most of the Z-series trains stop at either Beijing, Beijing Fengtai and Shanghai railway station or Shanghai Songjiang.

== List of Z-series trains (as of September 1, 2025) ==
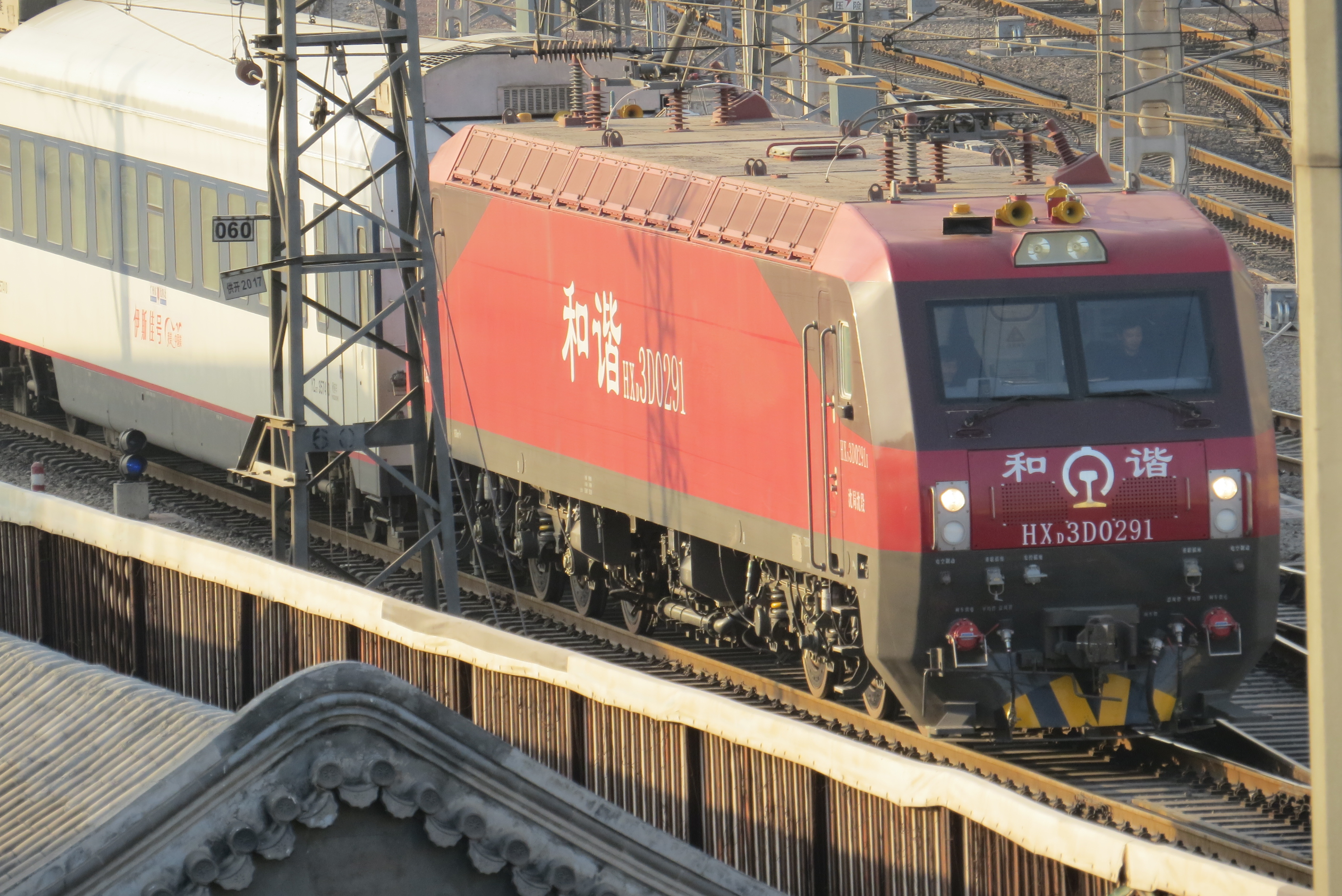
Z11 departing Beijing for Shenyang.

- Z5/6: Beijing West–Nanning
- Z12/13: Guangzhou Baiyun–Shenyang North
- Z14/11: Guangzhou Baiyun–Shenyang North
- Z15/16: Beijing–Harbin
- Z17/18: Beijing–Qiqihar
- Z21/22: Beijing West–Lhasa
- Z25/28: Wuchang–Shanghai Songjiang
- Z27/26: Wuchang–Shanghai Songjiang
- Z29/30: Beijing Fengtai–Qidong
- Z31/34: Wuchang–Ningbo
- Z32/33: Wuchang–Ningbo
- Z40/41: Shanghai–Urumqi
- Z42/39: Shanghai–Urumqi
- Z45/48: Wuchang–Hangzhou
- Z47/46: Wuchang–Hangzhou
- Z51/52: Beijing–Qidong
- Z53/54: Beijing West–Kunming
- Z55/56: Beijing West–Lanzhou
- Z61/62: Beijing West–Changchun
- Z69/70: Beijing West–Urumqi
- Z77/78: Beijing West–Guiyang
- Z83/84: Beijing–Qiqihar
- Z99/100: Shanghai–Guangzhou Baiyun
- Z102/103: Changchun–Xiamen North
- Z104/101: Changchun–Xiamen North
- Z105/106: Jinan–Urumqi
- Z112/113: Harbin West–Haikou
- Z114/111: Harbin West–Haikou
- Z117/118: Beijing–Jilin
- Z126/127: Xiamen North–Lanzhou
- Z128/125: Xiamen North–Lanzhou
- Z136/137: Guangzhou Baiyun–Urumqi
- Z138/135: Guangzhou Baiyun–Urumqi
- Z149/150: Beijing West–Guiyang
- Z151/152: Beijing West–Xining
- Z156/157: Harbin West–Taizhou
- Z158/155: Harbin West–Taizhou
- Z159/160: Beijing–Rizhao West
- Z161/162: Beijing West–Kunming
- Z164/165: Shanghai–Lhasa
- Z166/163: Shanghai–Lhasa
- Z170/167: Qingdao North–Guangzhou
- Z168/169: Qingdao North–Guangzhou
- Z172/173: Harbin West–Shanghai
- Z174/171: Harbin West–Shanghai
- Z176/177: Harbin West–Hangzhou
- Z178/175: Harbin West–Hangzhou
- Z179/180: Beijing West–Urumqi
- Z182/183: Shenzhen East–Baotou/Bayannur
- Z184/181: Shenzhen East–Baotou/Bayannur
- Z186/187: Shenyang North–Shenzhen
- Z188/185: Shenyang North–Shenzhen
- Z198/195: Taiyuan–Shanghai
- Z196/197: Taiyuan–Shanghai
- Z206/207: Tianjin–Changsha
- Z208/205: Tianjin–Changsha
- Z211/212: Beijing–Changchun
- Z223/224: Chongqing West–Lhasa
- Z225/228: Beijing Fengtai–Hefei
- Z227/226: Beijing Fengtai–Hefei
- Z230/231: Shenzhen East–Xining
- Z232/229: Shenzhen East–Xining
- Z236/237: Harbin West–Guangzhou
- Z238/235: Harbin West–Guangzhou
- Z245/248: Changsha–Shanghai South
- Z247/246: Changsha–Shanghai South
- Z256/257: Shanghai South–Chongqing North
- Z258/255: Shanghai South–Chongqing North
- Z264/265: Guangzhou–Lhasa
- Z266/263: Guangzhou–Lhasa
- Z267/270: Hohhot–Shanghai
- Z268/269: Hohhot–Shanghai
- Z272/273: Qingdao–Xining
- Z274/271: Qingdao–Xining
- Z282/283: Baotou–Hangzhou
- Z284/281: Baotou–Hangzhou
- Z285/286: Beijing West–Nanning
- Z288/289: Kunming–Ningbo
- Z290/287: Kunming–Ningbo
- Z294/291: Urumqi–Wuchang
- Z292/293: Urumqi–Wuchang
- Z297/296: Beijing West–Zhangjiajie West
- Z295/298: Beijing West–Zhangjiajie West
- Z306/303: Urumqi–Shanghai
- Z304/305: Urumqi–Shanghai
- Z308/309: Qiqihar–Shenzhen East
- Z310/307: Qiqihar–Shenzhen East
- Z318/315: Qingdao North–Chengdu West
- Z316/317: Qingdao North–Chengdu West
- Z322/323: Chengdu–Lhasa
- Z324/321: Chengdu–Lhasa
- Z328/325: Changchun–Kunming
- Z326/327: Changchun–Kunming
- Z332/333: Shenzhen East–Chengdu East
- Z334/331: Shenzhen East–Chengdu East
- Z336/337: Baotou–Nanning
- Z338/335: Baotou–Nanning
- Z342/343: *Zhengzhou–Xiamen North
- Z344/341: *Zhengzhou–Xiamen North
- Z350/351: Baotou–Qingdao North
- Z352/349: Baotou–Qingdao North
- Z356/357: Jinan–Urumqi
- Z358/355: Jinan–Urumqi
- Z362/363: Nantong–Urumqi
- Z364/361: Nantong–Urumqi
- Z368/365: Harbin West–Nanjing
- Z366/367: Harbin West–Nanjing
- Z372/373: Urumqi–Kunming
- Z374/371: Urumqi–Kunming
- Z376/377: Xining–Shanghai
- Z378/375: Xining–Shanghai
- Z384/385: Changchun–Sanya
- Z386/383: Changchun–Sanya
- Z390/391: Fuzhou–Chengdu
- Z392/389: Fuzhou–Chengdu
- Z398/395: Changchun–Nanning
- Z396/397: Changchun–Nanning
- Z501/504: Sanya–Beijing West
- Z502/503: Sanya–Beijing West
- Z508/509: Chengdu West–Urumqi
- Z510/507: Chengdu West–Urumqi
- Z516/517: Shanghai–Jilin
- Z518/515: Shanghai–Jilin
- Z586/587: Chengdu West–Shenzhen East
- Z588/585: Chengdu West–Shenzhen East
- Z594/595: Hangzhou–Urumqi
- Z596/593: Hangzhou–Urumqi
- Z917/918: Xi'an–Lhasa
- Z6205/6206: Lanzhou–Jiayuguan
- Z6516/6517: Urumqi–Kashgar
- Z6518/6515: Urumqi–Kashgar
- Z6541: Baotou–Linhe
- Z6543/6544: Hohhot–Ordos
- Z6801/6802: Xining–Lhasa
- Z8801/8802: Lhasa–Shigatse
